= List of Bengalis =

This article provides lists of famous and notable Bengali people in the South Asia, people with Bengali ancestry, and people who speak Bengali as their primary or basic language.

== Monarchs ==
=== Pala Dynasty (750-1161) ===
- Gopala I, the founder of the Pala dynasty, which was based in the Bengal region of the Indian subcontinent.
- Dharmapala, founder of ancient Vikramashila Buddhist Mahavihara, it was one of the three most important Buddhist Mahaviharas in ancient India, along with Nalanda and Taxila.
- Devapala, expanded the frontiers of the empire by conquering the present-day Assam and Orissa.
- Mahendrapala
- Shurapala I
- Vigrahapala I
- Narayanapala
- Gopala II
- Vigrahapala II
- Mahipala I
- Nayapala
- Vigrahapala III
- Mahipala II
- Shurapala II
- Ramapala
- Kumarapala
- Gopala III
- Madanapala
- Govindapala

=== Chandra Dynasty (370-1050) ===
- Traillokyachandra (900–930)
- Srichandra (930–975)
- Kalyanachandra (975–1000)
- Ladahachandra (1000–1020)
- Govindachandra (1020–1050)

=== Sena Dynasty (1070-1230) ===
- Hemanta Sena, founder of Sena dynasty (1070-1096)
- Vijaya Sena (1096-1159)
- Ballala Sena (1159-1179)
- Lakshmana Sena, last united Bengal ruler of Sena dynasty (1179-1206)
- Vishvarupa Sena (1206-1225)
- Keshava Sena (1225-1230)

=== Deva Dynasty ===
- Dasharathadeva (1281)

=== Ilyas Shahi dynasty (1352–1414) ===
Name	Reign	Notes
Shamsuddin Ilyas Shah	1352–1358	Became the first sole ruler of whole Bengal comprising Sonargaon, Satgaon and Lakhnauti.
Sikandar Shah	1358–1390	Killed in battle with his son and successor, Ghiyasuddin Azam Shah
Ghiyasuddin Azam Shah	1390–1411	Patron of the first recorded Bengali poet Shah Muhammad Saghir
Saifuddin Hamza Shah	1411–1412	
Nasiruddin Mahmud Shah	1435–1459	
Rukunuddin Barbak Shah	1459–1474	
Shamsuddin Yusuf Shah	1474–1481	Patron of Bengali poet Zainuddin
Nuruddin Sikandar Shah	1481	
Jalaluddin Fateh Shah	1481–1487	

=== House of Ganesha ===
- Raja Ganesha
- Jalaluddin Muhammad Shah
- Shamsuddin Ahmad Shah (1419–1436)

=== Hussain Shahi dynasty (1494–1538) ===
Name	Reign	Notes
Alauddin Hussain Shah	1494–1518	His witnessed a remarkable development of Bengali literature.
Nasiruddin Nasrat Shah	1518–1533	
Alauddin Firuz Shah	1533	
Ghiyasuddin Mahmud Shah	1533–1538	

=== Other ===
- Bir Hambir, 16th-century king of Mallabhum kingdom who accompanied Mughal emperor Akbar against Afghan forces of North Orissa.
- Paragal Khan, 16th-century governor of Chittagong
- Chhuti Khan, 16th-century governor of Chittagong
- Shahzada Danyal, son of Alauddin Husain Shah
- Syeda Momena Khatun, daughter of Ghiyasuddin Mahmud Shah
- Isa Khan (1529–1599), one of the most prominent leader of the Baro-Bhuiyan chieftains of Bengal
- Kalapahar (d.1576), a Bengali Muslim General of the Bengal Sultanate under the reigning Karrani Dynasty.
- Musa Khan (d. 1623), leader of the Baro-Bhuiyan chieftains of Bengal
- Dilal Khan (1585–1666), final independent ruler of Sandwip
- Kedar Ray ( 1561–1616), last independent Raja of Bikrampur, one of the prominent Baro-Bhuyan
- Mohanlal (Dewan), Dewan,serving under Siraj-ud-Daulah,known for his historic resistance in Battle of Plassey.
- Lutfunnisa Begum (1740-1790), 3rd wife and primary consort of Siraj ud-Daulah, the last independent Nawab of Bengal.
- Rani Bhabani (1716-1803), Queen of Natore, was a Hindu zamindar during the British colonial era.
- Maharaja Nandakumar, a tax collector under East India Company,executed in 1775.
- Pratapaditya Guha (1561–1611), last independent Raja of Jessore, fought against the Mughal Empire One of the most prominent leader of Baro-Bhuiyan
- Kirtinarayan Basu (r. 1668–?), fifth Raja of Chandradwip and founder of the Muslim Baklai family
- Maharani Bhavashankari (1570–1616), Rani of Bhurishrestha and prominent member of the Baro-Bhuyan
- Sitaram Ray (1658–1714), Raja of Bhati and rebelled against the Mughal Empire
- Chowdhury Abu Torab Khan (d. 1767), zamindar of Sandwip and leader of Bengal's first anti-colonial uprising
- Titumir (1782–1831), anti-colonial rebel and self-proclaimed Badshah
- Rahimullah (d. 1861), Chief of Baraikhali and leader of the Sundarbans Indigo Revolt
- Golam Ali Chowdhury (1824–1888), zamindar of Haturia and philanthropist

== Nobel laureates ==
- Rabindranath Tagore, Nobel Prize in Literature, First Nobel Prize winner of Asia, 1913
- Amartya Sen, Nobel Memorial Prize in Economic Sciences, 1998
- Muhammad Yunus, Nobel Peace Prize, 2006
- Abhijit Banerjee, Nobel Memorial Prize in Economic science, 2019
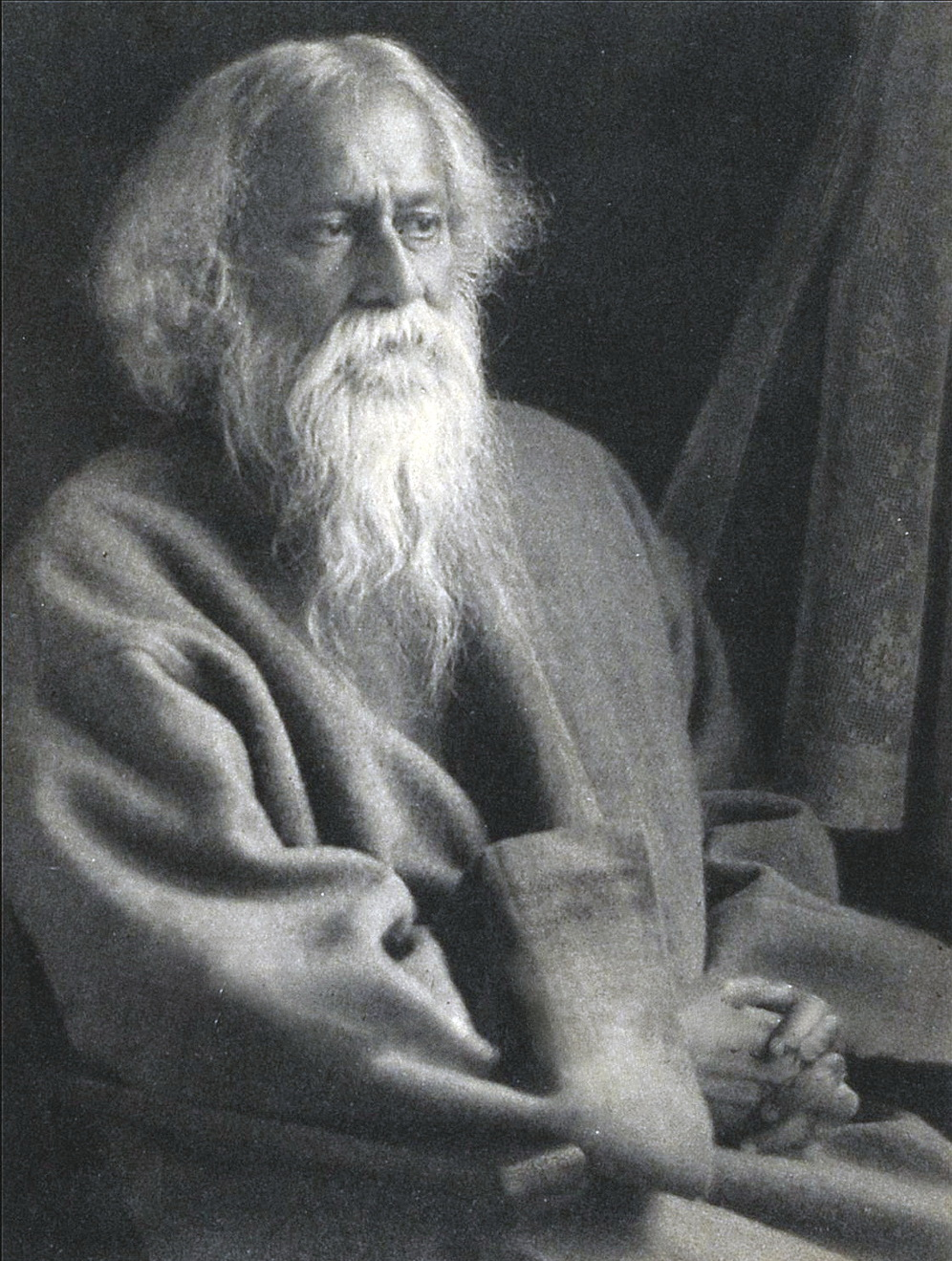
Rabindranath Tagore

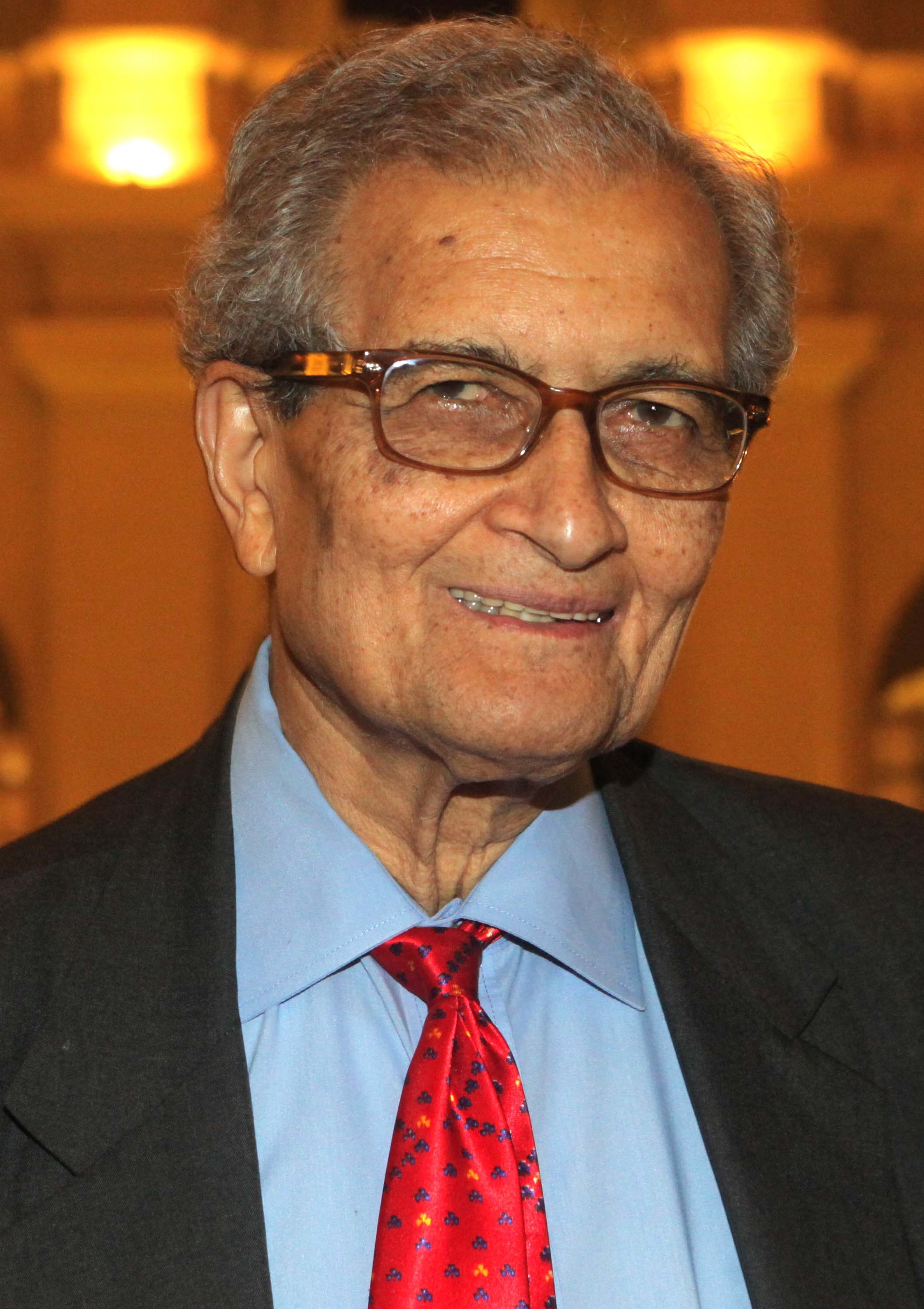
Amartya Sen

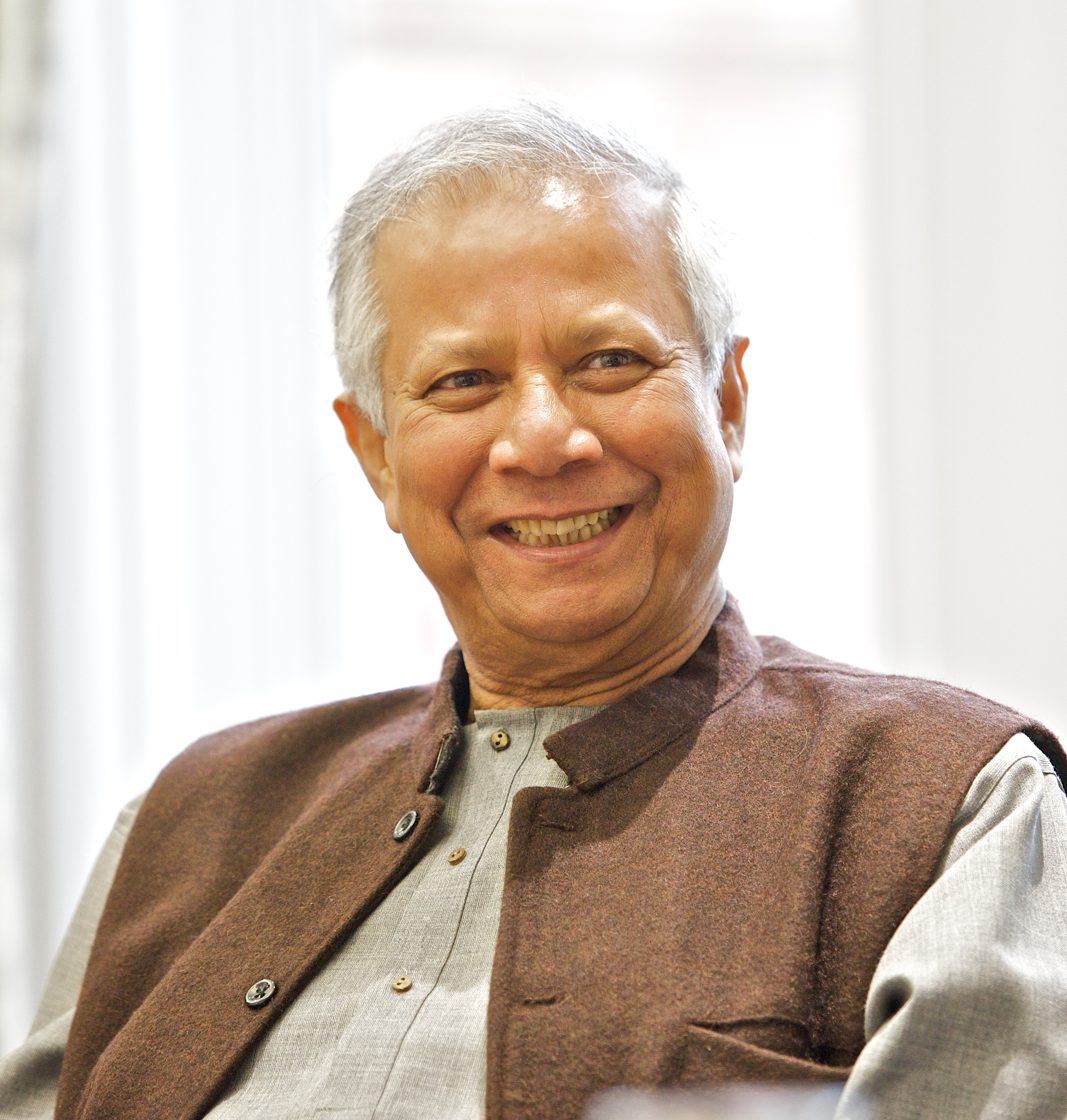
Muhammad Yunus

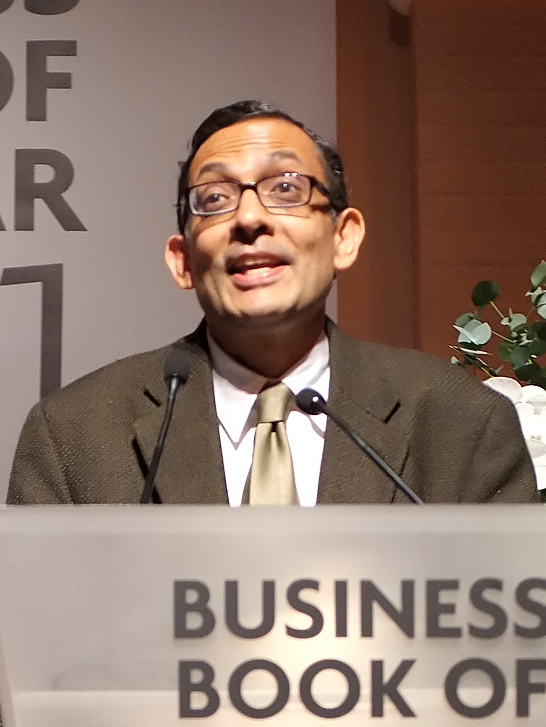
Abhijit Banerjee

== Academics ==
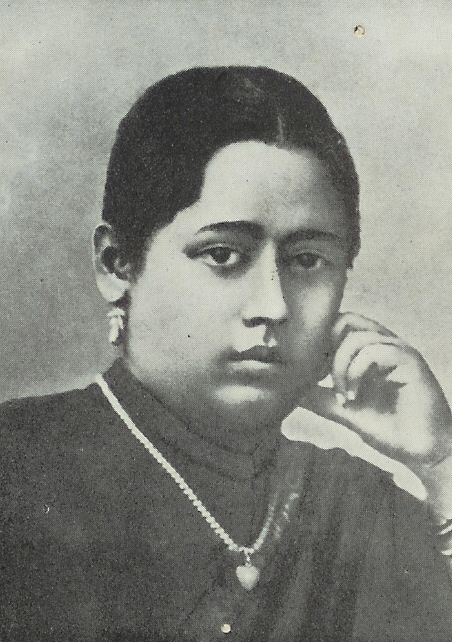
Chandramukhi Basu,one of the first two female graduates in British India.

Abdul Malik was Pakistan's first cardiologist.

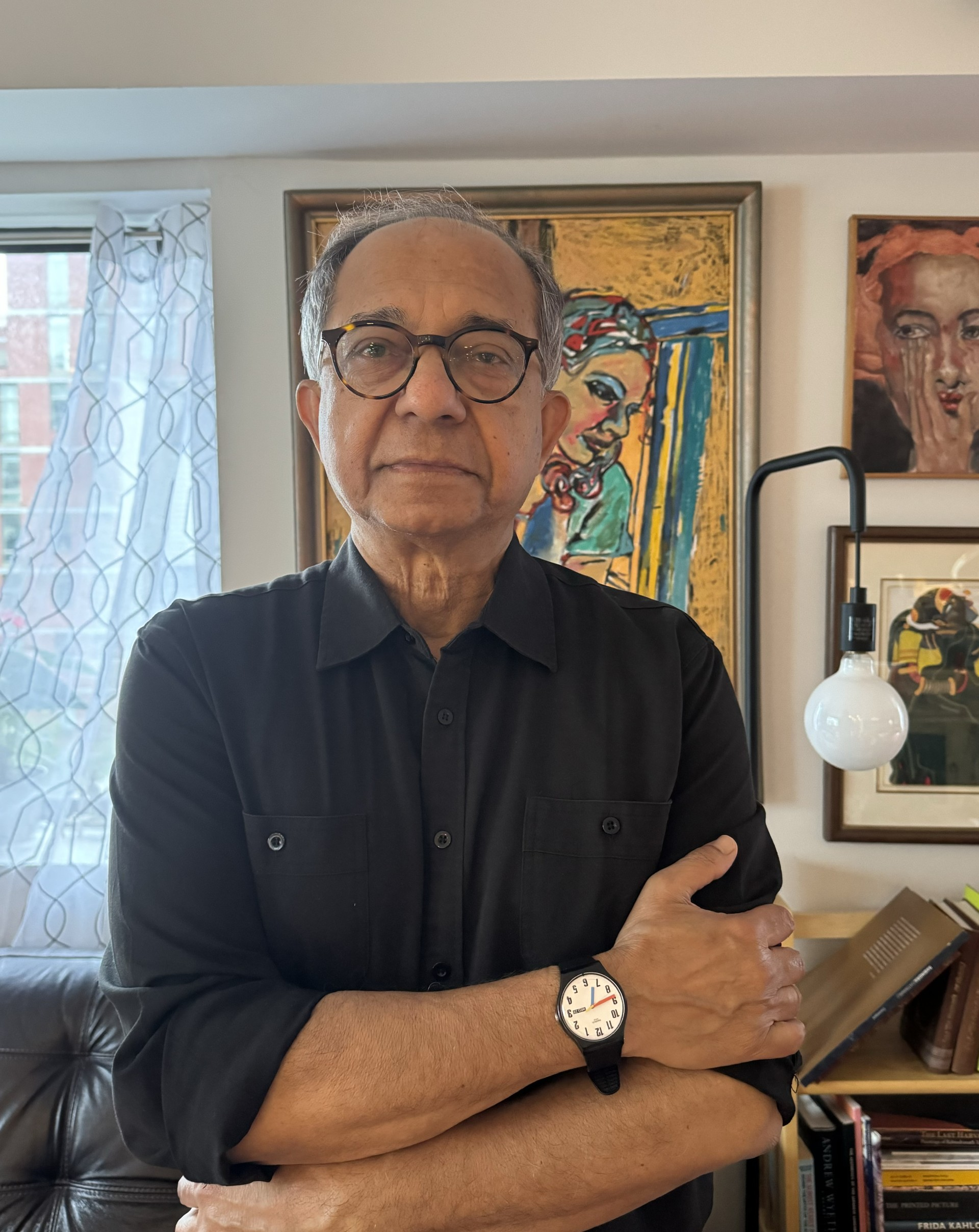
Kaushik Basu served as the Chief Economic Adviser to the Government of India.

- Pranab Bardhan, Indian economist who has taught and worked in the United States since 1979.
- Radhakamal Mukerjee, Indian social scientist who was Professor of Economics and Sociology and Vice-Chancellor of the University of Lucknow.
- Momtazuddin Ahmed, philosopher and educationist
- Abu Sayeed Ayyub, Indian philosopher, teacher, literary critic.
- Dewan Mohammad Azraf, National Professor of Bangladesh
- Sanghamitra Bandyopadhyay, first women Director of Indian Statistical Institute, India
- Chandramukhi Basu, computer scientist and first female graduate in India, and the British Empire
- Kaushik Basu, Indian economist who was Chief Economist of the World Bank from 2012 to 2016 and Chief Economic Adviser to the Government of India from 2009 to 2012.
- Sekhar Basu was an Indian nuclear scientist who served as the chairman of the Atomic Energy Commission and Secretary to the Government of India
- Nurunnahar Fatema Begum, head of paediatric cardiology at the Combined Medical Hospital (Dhaka)
- Anudvaipayan Bhattacharya, university lecturer martyred in the Bangladesh Liberation War
- Jatindramohan Bhattacharya, academic and literary researcher
- Padmanath Bhattacharya, academic and literary researcher
- Mahesh Chandra Nyayratna Bhattacharyya, Indian Sanskrit scholar during Bengal Renaissance,served as the principal of the Sanskrit College from 1876 to 1895.
- Abdul Karim Sahitya Bisharad, littérateur and historian of Bangla literature
- Jagadish Chandra Bose was a polymath with interests in biology, physics, botany and writing science fiction.
- Raj Chandra Bose was an Indian American mathematician and statistician best known for his work in design theory
- Satyendra Nath Bose was an Indian mathematician and physicist specializing in theoretical physics.
- Sugata Bose, Indian historian and he is the Gardiner Chair of Oceanic History and Affairs at Harvard University.
- Dipesh Chakrabarty, Indian historian,and leading scholar of postcolonial theory and subaltern studies,recipient of the 2014 Toynbee Prize.
- Sudhir Chakraborty, researcher of Bengal's folk culture
- Swapan Kumar Chakravorty, literary scholar and writer
- Partha Chatterjee, political scientist
- Suniti Kumar Chatterjee, linguist, educationist, litterateur
- Sukanta Chaudhuri, literary scholar, writer, translator
- Supriya Chaudhuri, literary scholar, writer, translator
- Jamilur Reza Choudhury, vice-chancellor of University of Asia Pacific, adviser to Caretaker Government of Bangladesh
- Sadruddin Ahmed Chowdhury, physicist and vice-chancellor of Shahjalal University of Science and Technology and Sylhet International University
- R. C. Majumdar, Indian historian,belonging to the nationalist school of Indian historiography.
- Khudiram Das, literary scholar, educationist, linguist.
- Satish Ranjan Das, founder of The Doon School, Dehradun
- Shomie Das, Indian educationist, former headmaster of The Doon School
- Tarak Chandra Das, anthropologist, author, former teacher in anthropology, University of Calcutta
- Bhupendranath Datta, revolutionary, author, anthropologist
- Barun De, chairman, West Bengal Heritage Commission
- Soumitra Dutta, Dean Elect of Saïd Business School at University of Oxford and former Founding Dean of Samuel Curtis Johnson Graduate School of Management at Cornell University
- Anil Kumar Gain, mathematician from University of Cambridge, Fellow of the Royal Statistical Society
- Kaberi Gain, prominent academic, author, and social activist
- Saroj Ghose, science populariser and museum maker, won an award for Best Effort in Science Popularisation Amongst Children
- Jayati Ghosh, an Indian development economist and the Chairperson of the Centre for Economic Studies and Planning at the Jawaharlal Nehru University
- Subir Kumar Ghosh, planetary scientist and a winner of the Shanti Swarup Bhatnagar Prize for Science and Technology
- Dipak Giri, writer, editor and academic
- Ranajit Guha, Indian historian and founder of the Subaltern Studies Collective.
- Aminul Hoque MBE, lecturer at Goldsmiths, University of London, writer
- K M Baharul Islam, dean of the Indian Institute of Management Kashipur
- Syed Manzoorul Islam, critic, writer, former professor of Dhaka University
- Mohammad Ataul Karim, provost and executive vice chancellor of the University of Massachusetts Dartmouth
- Ataur Rahman Khan Khadim, physician martyred during the Bangladesh Liberation War
- Salman Khan, American educator, founder of Khan Academy
- Nazia Khanum, Order of the British Empire (OBE) and Deputy Lieutenant (DL)
- Shahla Khatun, obstetrician and gynecologist
- Prasanta Chandra Mahalanobis, statistician, founder of Indian Statistical Institute
- R. C. Majumdar, Indian historian,belonging to the nationalist school of Indian historiography.
- Brigadier Abdul Malik, founder of National Heart Foundation
- Ujjwal Maulik, computer scientist and former Head, Computer Science and Engineering, Jadavpur University
- Vina Mazumdar, academic, activist and feminist
- Asoke Nath Mitra, awarded the Shanti Swarup Bhatnagar Prize in 1969 for his fundamental contributions in obtaining the exact solution of the nucleon three-body problem
- Rajendralal Mitra, first modern Indologist of Indian origin
- Sisir Kumar Mitra, Indian physicist and president of The Asiatic Society from 1951 to 1953
- Nurul Momen, professor of law, Dhaka University Proctor, Dean
- Satish Chandra Mukherjee, educationist
- Abdul Muktadir, academic martyred in the Bangladesh Liberation War
- Ashutosh Mukherjee, Indian mathematician, lawyer, jurist, judge, educator, and institution builder. A unique figure in Indian history, he made major contributions in the fields of mathematics, law, and higher education.He became a Fellow of the Royal Society of Edinburgh at the age of 22, and was a Fellow or Member of various learned bodies in Europe and the United States.
- Nurul Islam Nahid, former Education Minister of Bangladesh
- Ashis Nandy, political psychologist
- Sankar Kumar Pal, pioneer in Machine Intelligence Research, and President and former Director of Indian Statistical Institute, India
- M. A. Rashid, first Vice-chancellor of Bangladesh University of Engineering and Technology
- Satyajit Ray, first Indian to win a Lifetime Achievement Oscar due to his significant contributions to world cinema
- Meghnad Saha was an Indian astrophysicist who developed the Saha ionization equation.
- Abul Kashem Sandwip, educationist and a founder of Bangladesh Betar
- Sir Jadunath Sarkar, prominent Indian historian and a specialist on the Mughal dynasty.
- Maqbular Rahman Sarkar, tenth vice-chancellor of Rajshahi University
- Nalini Ranjan Sarkar, economist, led the Sarkar Committee which recommended establishing Indian Institutes of Technology along the lines of the Massachusetts Institute of Technology
- Sumit Sarkar, historian
- Pranab K. Sen, statistician, Cary C. Boshamer Professor of Biostatistics at the University of North Carolina at Chapel Hill
- Sukumar Sen, Indian linguist
- Muhammad Shahidullah, educationist, writer, philologist, linguist, and theorist
- Mohammad Yusuf Siddiq, historian, epigraphist, researcher, professor and author
- Badruddin Umar (born 1931), Marxist–Leninist theorist and political activist
- Bimal Krishna Matilal, Indian philosopher
- Abu Nasr Waheed, Islamic scholar, author, politician and educationist
- Nafees Bin Zafar, Academy Scientific and Technical Award, the first Bangladeshi to receive an Academy Scientific and Technical Award.

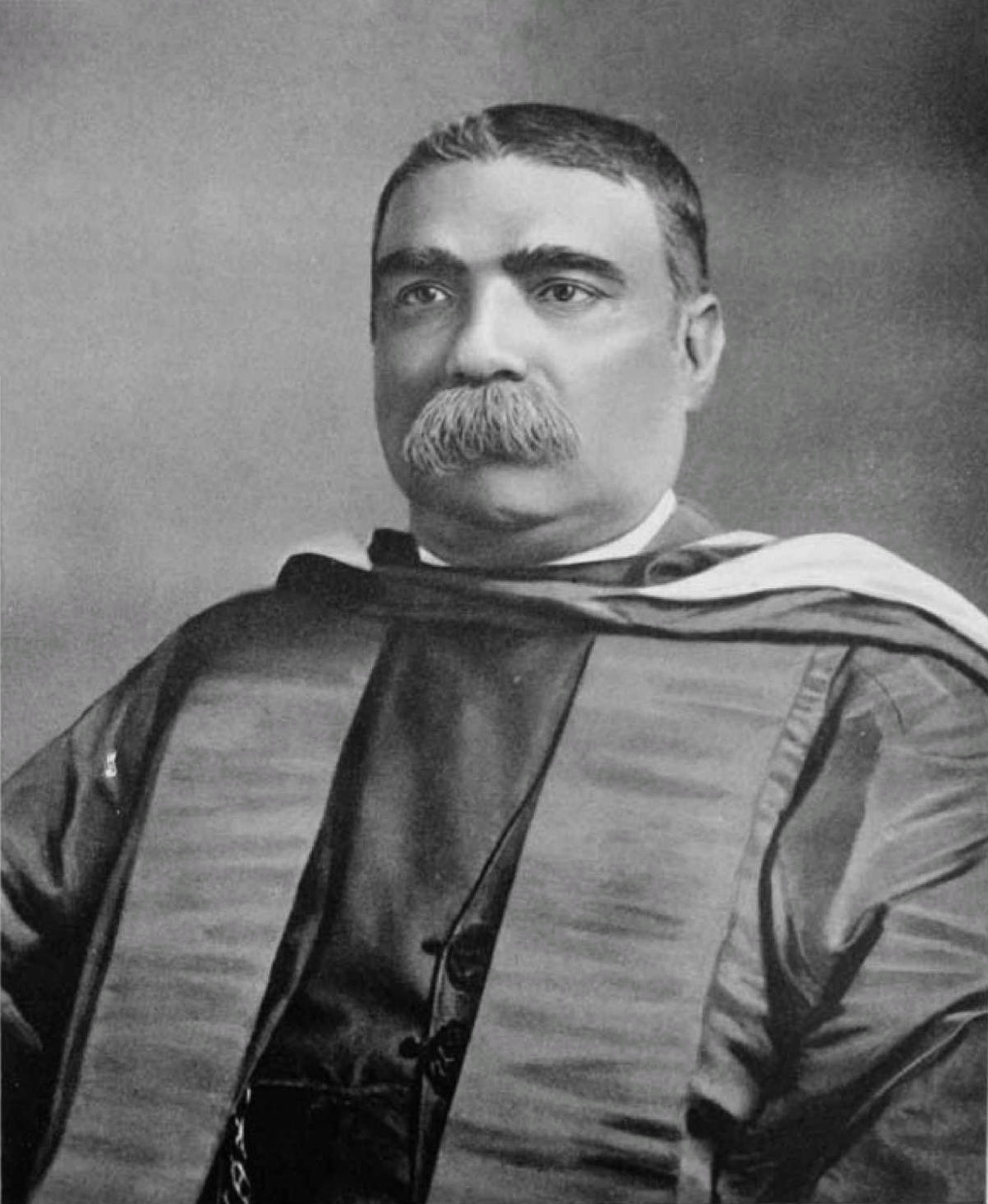
Asutosh Mukhopadhyay, jurist, educator and mathematician

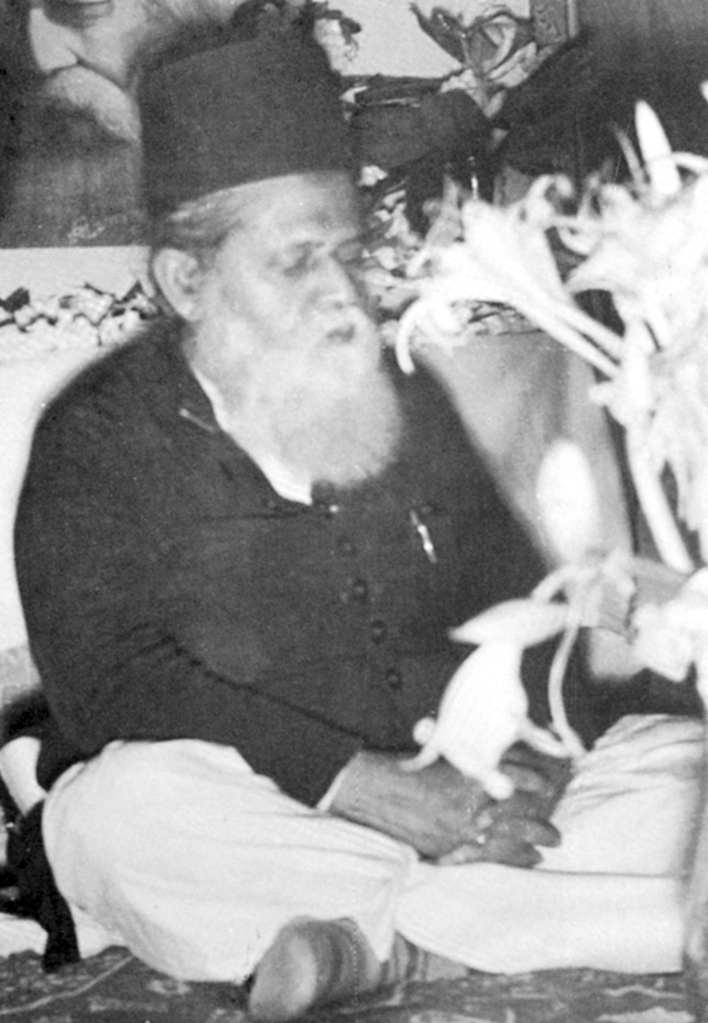
Muhammad Shahidullah, Linguist

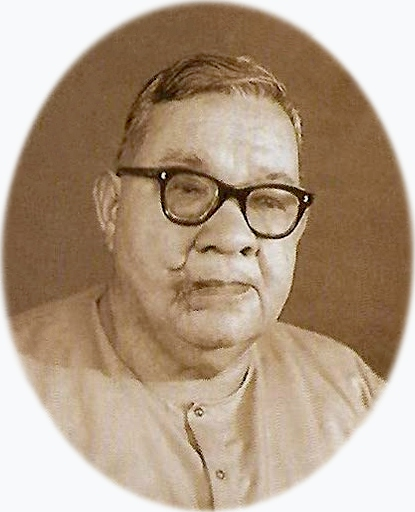
Sukumar Sen, Linguist

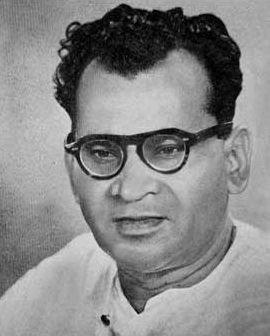
Suniti Kumar Chatterjee, Linguist

Abdul Karim Sahitya Bisharad, Interpreter of old Bangla manuscripts

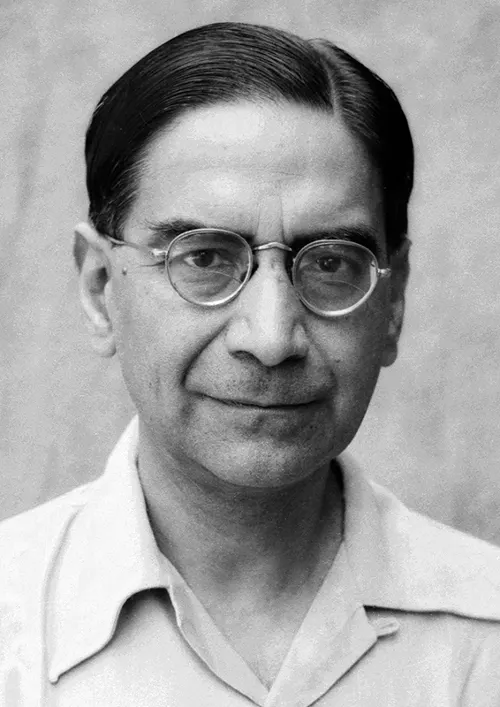
Prasanta Chandra Mahalanobis , statistician, founder of Indian Statistical Institute

== Actors and entertainers ==
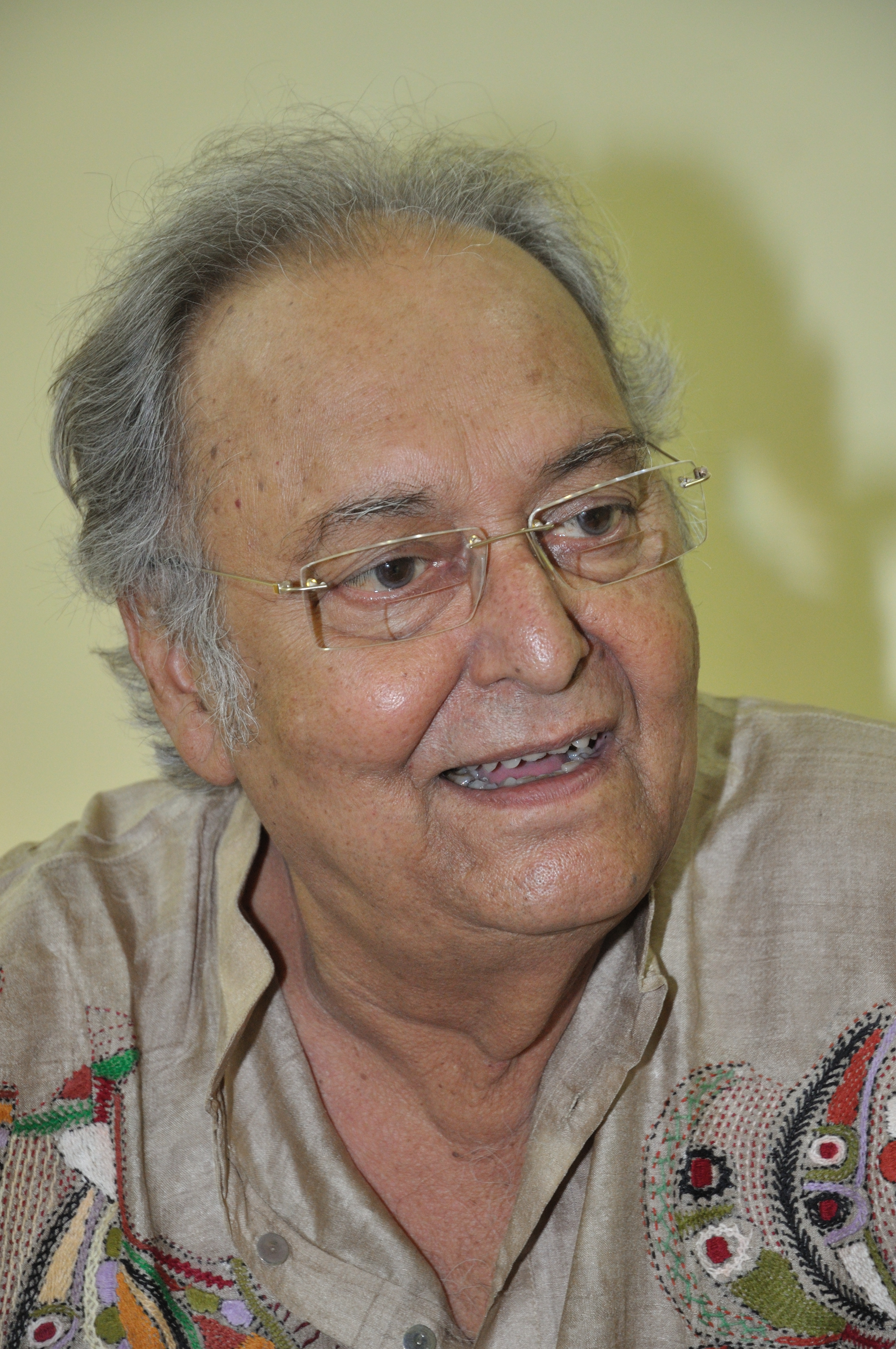
Soumitra Chatterjee, an iconic Bengali actor from India.

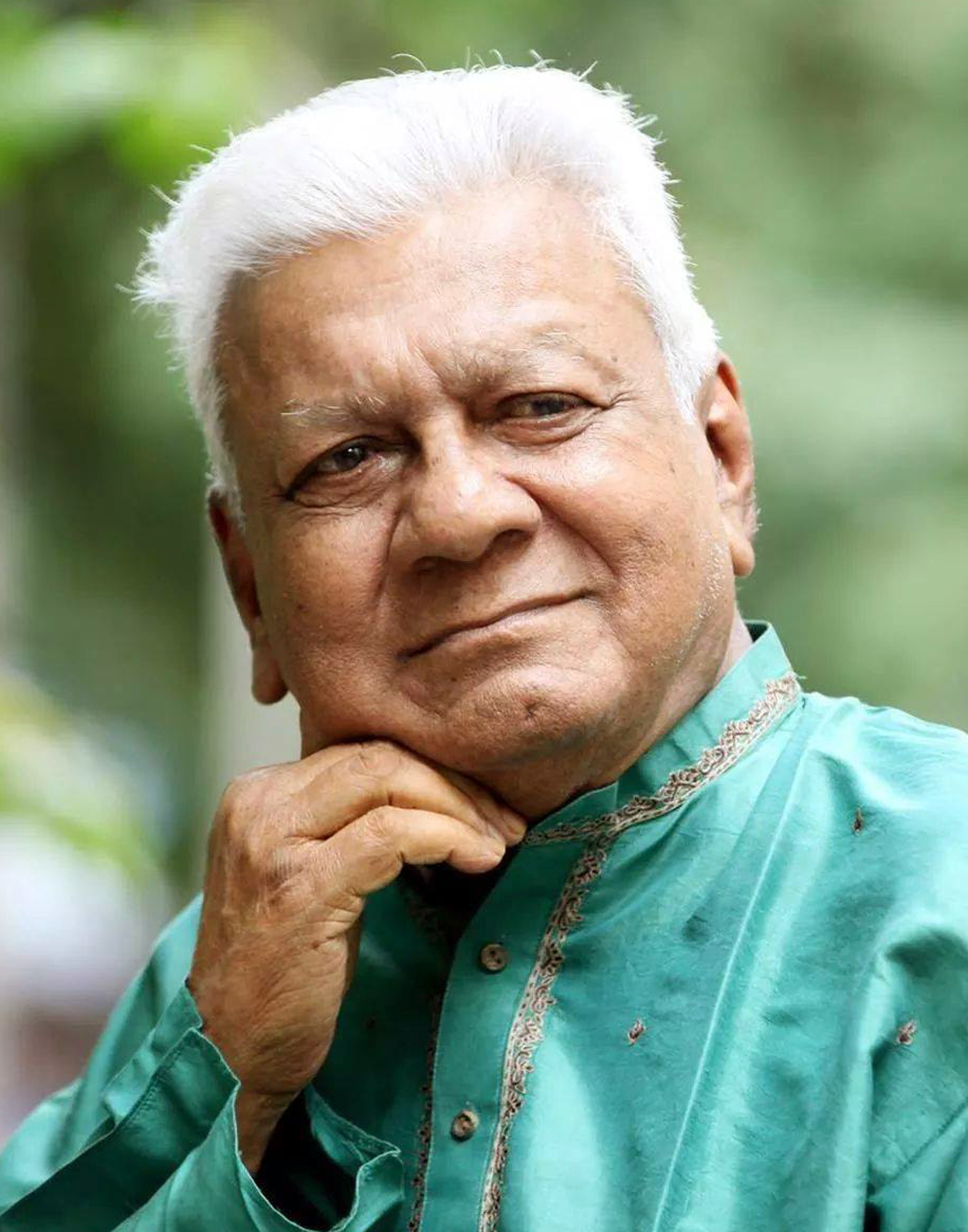
Khalil Ullah Khan earned Bangladesh National Film Award for Best Supporting Actor for his role in Gunda in 1976.

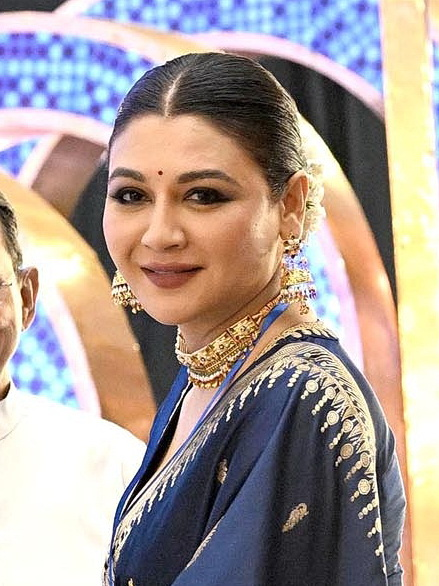
Jaya Ahsan at the National Film Awards-2022' at the Bangabandhu International Conference Center in Dhaka.

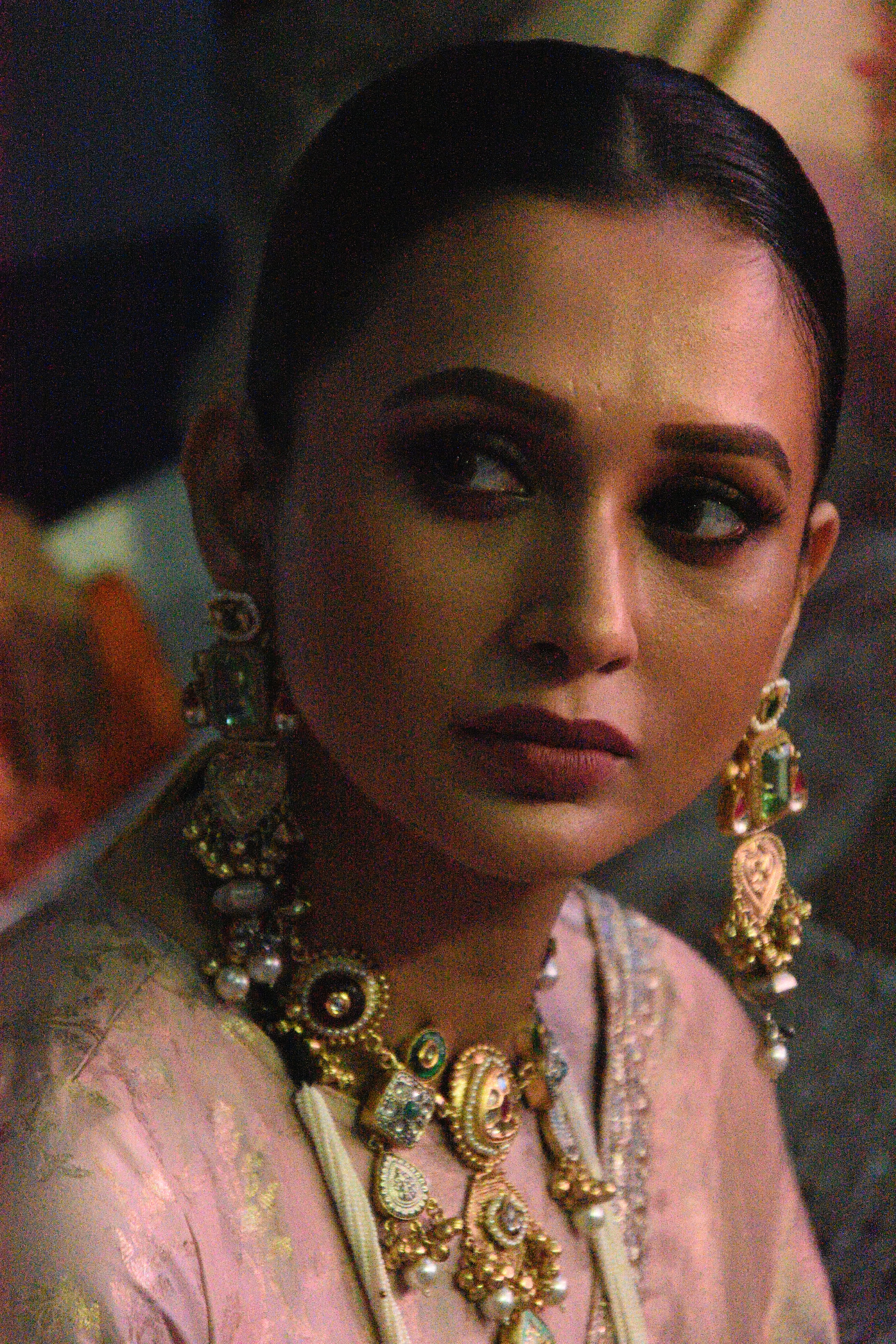
Mimi Chakraborty at the opening function of the '29th Kolkata International Film Festival' or KIFF 29, in Kolkata.

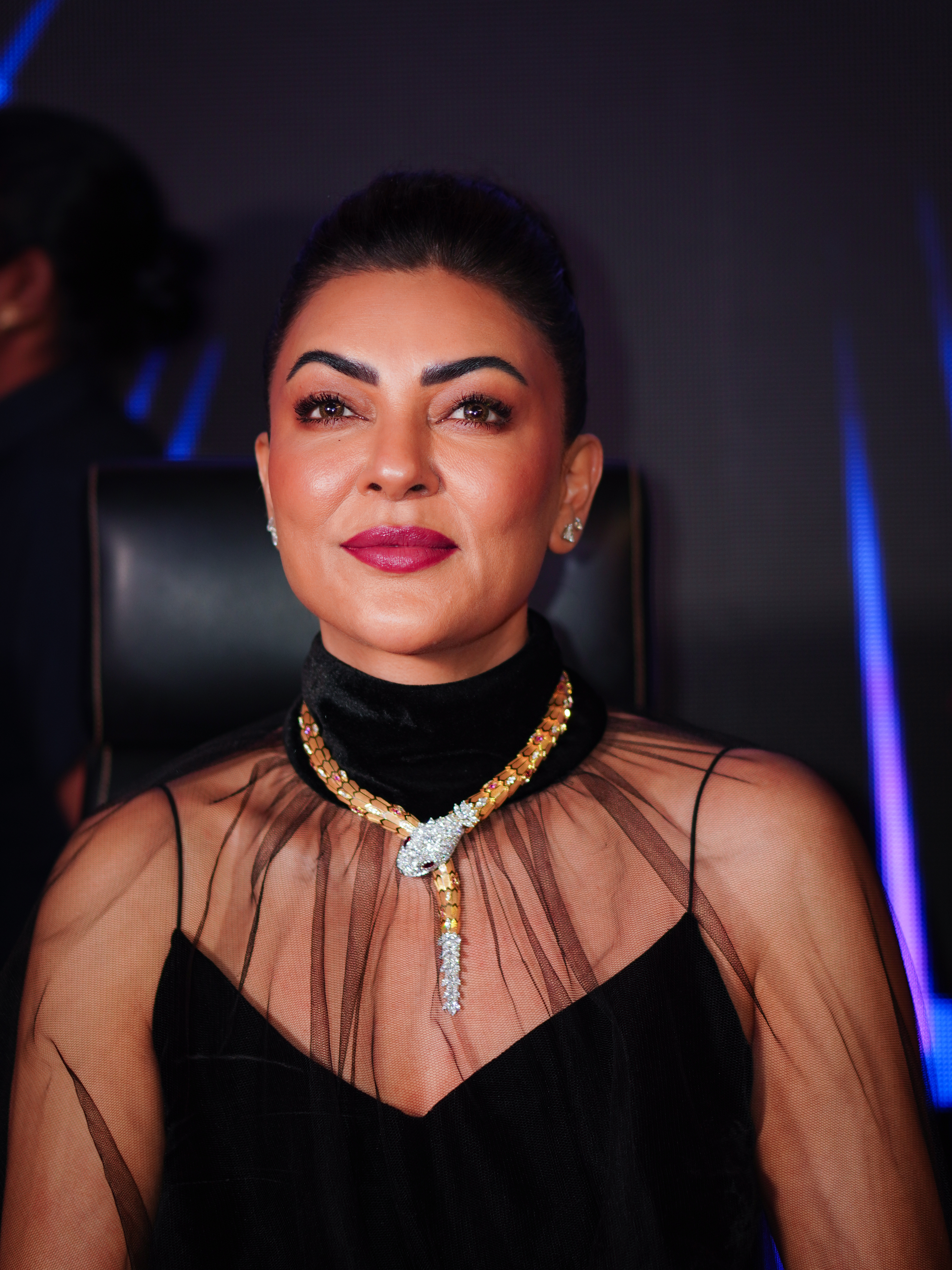
Sushmita Sen at the opening of Miss Universe India in 2026.

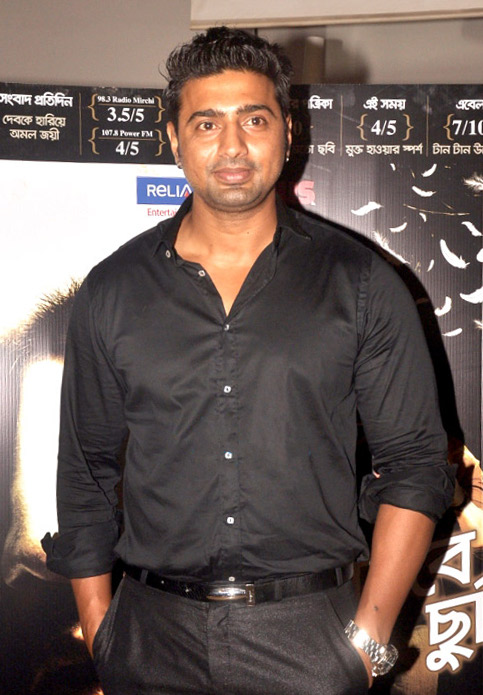
Dev (Bengali actor)

- Mimi Chakraborty, Tollywood actress
- Laboni Sarkar, Tollywood actress
- Siam Ahmed, Bangladeshi actor and model
- Amala Akkineni, Bollywood actress
- Alamgir, Bengali film actor and TV host
- Jaya Ahsan, Bangladeshi film actress, model, producer
- Niloy Alamgir, model and actor
- Ruhul Amin (Bangladeshi film director)
- Afshan Azad, actress best known for the role of Padma Patil in Harry Potter
- Azim, actor best known for the role of Rahim Badshah in Rupban
- Jaya Bachchan, Bollywood and Bengali film actress
- Abhishek Bachchan, Bollywood actor; son of Jaya Bachchan
- Bidita Bag, Bollywood and Bengali film actress
- Ajitesh Bandopadhyay, stage and film actor
- Ankush Hazra, Bengali film actor, producer, dancer and TV personality
- Bhanu Banerjee, Bengali film actor, voice artist, comedian and singer
- Abhishek Banerjee, Bollywood actor and casting director
- Jenni Banerjee, Indian origin Finnish actor
- Karuna Banerjee, first Indian actress earned BAFTA Award for Best Actress nomination at the 1959 BAFTA Awards
- Sarvadaman D. Banerjee
- Sushmita Sen, Web Series, Bollywood actress and former Miss Universe 1994 winner; the only first Indian woman to win the title
- Shaurja Bhattacharya, Bengali film and TV actor
- Victor Banerjee, Bengali film, Bollywood and Hollywood actor; the only Indian to win National Board of Review Award for Best Actor
- Yash Dasgupta, Bengali film actor, producer and TV personality
- Bipasha Basu, Bollywood actress
- Dia Mirza, Bollywood actress, producer and former Miss Asia Pacific International 2000
- Jaya Bhattacharya, Bollywood and Hindi TV actress
- Nivedita Bhattacharya, theatre actress
- Samit Bhanja, Bollywood and Bengali film actor
- Ritwik Bhowmik, Bollywood actor
- Chhabi Biswas, Bengali film actor
- Seema Biswas, Bollywood actress
- Rahul Bose, Bollywood actor and Rugby player
- Sabyasachi Chakrabarty, Bollywood and Bengali film actor
- Samrat Chakrabarti, British-American actor and musician
- Indrani Chakraborty, Bollywood actress
- Mithun Chakraborty, Bollywood and Bengali film actor
- Rhea Chakraborty, Bollywood actress
- Ritwick Chakraborty, Bengali film actor
- Tulsi Chakraborty, Bengali film actor
- Abhishek Chatterjee, Bengali film and TV actor
- Abir Chatterjee, Bengali film actor and TV host
- Anangsha Biswas, Bollywood and Web Series actress
- Anil Chatterjee, Bengali film actor
- Biswajit Chatterjee, Bollywood and Bengali film actor
- Dhritiman Chatterjee, Bollywood and Bengali film actor
- Moushumi Chatterjee, Bollywood and Bengali film actress
- Prasenjit Chatterjee, Bengali film and Bollywood actor
- Priyanshu Chatterjee, Bollywood actor
- Sabitri Chatterjee, Bengali film actor
- Saswata Chatterjee, Bengali film actor
- Soham Chakraborty, Bengali film actor, producer, TV personality and politician
- Soumitra Chatterjee, Bengali film actor
- Subhendu Chatterjee, Bengali film actor
- Tannishtha Chatterjee, Bollywood and Bengali film actress
- Jayanta Chattopadhyay, Bangladeshi actor
- Khaled Choudhury, theatre personality and artist
- Sarita Choudhury, Indian origin British film, Hollywood actress
- Chanchal Chowdhury, Bangladeshi actor
- Rafiqul Bari Chowdhury, cinematographer and director
- Shefali Chowdhury, actress best known for the role of Parvati Patil in Harry Potter
- Paoli Dam, actress
- Shraddha Das, Bollywood and Bengali film actress
- Dev, Bengali film actor, producer, singer and screenwriter
- Debina Bonnerjee, Bollywood and TV actress
- Kanon Devi, singer-actress, started acting at the age of 10 yrs as a child artist in "Joydeb ", later made her debut with "Rishir Prem" in 1931
- Koel Mallick, Bengali film actress
- Nyra Banerjee, Bollywood and TV actress
- Puja Banerjee, Bengali film and Hindi TV actress
- Pooja Banerjee, Hindi TV actress
- Sumita Devi, Bangladeshi film and TV actress
- Supriya Devi, Bengali film actress
- K. C. Dey, Bengali film actor
- Utpal Dutt, Bengali film actor
- Santosh Dutta Bengali film actor, famous for his portrayal of Jatayu in Feluda films of Satyajit Ray
- Tanushree Dutta, Bollywood actress and former Miss India Universe 2004
- Ishita Dutta, Bollywood and TV actress
- Prasun Gain, Bengali film actor
- Utpal Dutt,legendary Bengali actor and theatre artist
  Richa Gangopadhyay, Tollywood actress and former Miss India USA 2007
- Mouli Ganguly, actress
- Preeti Ganguly, actress
- Roopa Ganguly, Bengali film and Bollywood actress
- Rupali Ganguly, Bollywood and TV actress
- Rabi Ghosh, Bengali film actor
- Reshmi Ghosh, Bollywood and TV actress, former Miss India Earth 2002
- Sangita Ghosh, Hindi TV actress and model
- Shahana Goswami, Bollywood actress
- Debshankar Haldar, Indian stage, television and film actor
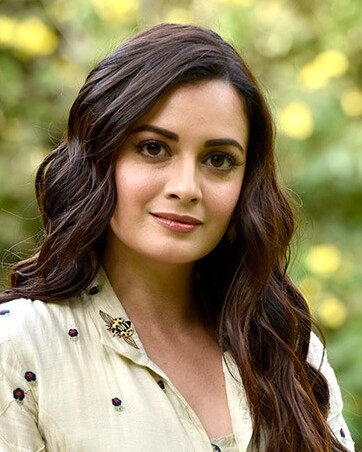
- Dia Mirza,Bollywood actress and former Miss Asia Pacific International 2000
  Gobinda Halder, Bengali lyricist and patriotic poet
- Goutam Halder, Indian actor and singer in theatre
- Indrani Haldar, National Award-winning Indian film actress
- Nabadwip Haldar, legendary comedian of Bengali cinema
- Priyanka Halder, Bengali film and television actress
- Trinetra Haldar Gummaraju, Indian actress and digital creator
- Abul Hayat, Bangladeshi actor
- Rizwan Hussain, TV personality, barrister and former CEO of Global Aid Trust
- Konnie Huq, British television presenter
- Nadiya Hussain, columnist, chef, author and TV personality best known for winning the baking competition The Great British Bake Off
- Nusrat Jahan, Bengali actress
- Imran Khan real name Imran Pal, Ex American actor who used to act in Bollywood films
- Khalil Ullah Khan, film and TV actor
- Shakib Khan, Bangladeshi actor, producer, singer, film organiser and media personality
- Anup Kumar, Tollywood actor
- Ashok Kumar, Bollywood actor
- Kishore Kumar, Bollywood singer, actor and music composer
- Pradeep Kumar, Bollywood actor
- Sanjeev Kumar, Bollywood actor
- Uttam Kumar, Bollywood and Bengali film actor
- Shaun Majumder, Canadian comedian and actor; winner of Gemini Awards
- Koena Mitra, former channel V VJ and Bollywood actress
- Rhona Mitra, half-Bengali actress in UK
- Joy Mukherjee, Bollywood actor
- Kajol, Bollywood and Tollywood actress
- Rani Mukerji, Bollywood and Kollywood actress
- Tanishaa Mukerji, Bollywood actress and TV host
- Kamalini Mukherjee, Bollywood and Tollywood actress
- Madhabi Mukherjee, actress notable works include charulata, mahanagar
- Sagarika Mukherjee, Bollywood and Tollywood actress and playback singer
- Shantanu Mukherjee, Bollywood actor, playback singer and TV host
- Shonali Bose, Bollywood film director, writer and producer
- Swastika Mukherjee, Tollywood actress
- Colin Pal, actor and publicist
- Patralekha, Bollywood actress
- Priyanka Bose, Bollywood actress and model
- Raakhee, Bollywood actress
- Ashiqur Rahman
- Khan Ataur Rahman, Bengali actor, director, producer, screenplay writer, music composer and singer
- Devika Rani, Bollywood and Bengali actress
- Lisa Ray, actress and model
- Razzak, Bangladeshi actor
- Rola, Bengali-Japanese model, tarento and actress
- Ziaul Roshan, film actor and model
- Bikash Roy, Tollywood actor
- Debashree Roy, Bengali film and Bollywood/TV actress
- Mouni Roy, Bollywood and TV actress
- Rahul Roy, Bollywood and Bhojpuri actor
- Rehaan Roy, Hindi TV and Bengali actor
- Reena Roy, Bollywood actress
- Rohit Roy, Bollywood and TV actor
- Ronit Roy, Bollywood and TV actor
- Rukmini Maitra, Bengali film and Bollywood actress
- Pahari Sanyal, Tollywood actor
- Aditya Seal, Bollywood and Web Series actor
- Antara Biswas, Hindi TV and Bhojpuri actress
- Aparna Sen, Bengali film actress
- Nandana Sen, Bollywood actress, daughter of Nobel laureate Amartya Sen
- Raima Sen, Bengali film and Bollywood actress
- Reema Sen, Bollywood and Kollywood actress
- Riddhi Sen, youngest recipient of the National Film Award for Best Actor
- Rimi Sen, Bollywood actress
- Riya Sen, Bollywood actress
- Sayantani Ghosh, Hindi TV and Bengali film actress
- Suchitra Sen, Bollywood and Bengali film actress
- Rituparna Sengupta, Bollywood and Bengali film actress
- Vikram Chatterjee, Bengali film and TV actor
- Ushoshi Sengupta, model, I Am She–Miss Universe India in 2010
- Shabnur, Bangladeshi actress
- Salman Shah, Bangladeshi actor
- Ali Shahalom, comedian and television presenter
- ATM Shamsuzzaman, Bangladeshi former actor
- Mamata Shankar, Bollywood and Bengali actress
- Konkona Sen Sharma, Bollywood actress
- Arifin Shuvoo, Bangladeshi actor
- Tiya Sircar, American actress
- Khushbu Sundar, Kollywood actress, producer and television presenter
- Saif Ali Khan, Bollywood actor; son of Sharmila Tagore
- Sharmila Tagore, Bollywood and Bengali film actress
- Soha Ali Khan, Bollywood actress; daughter of Sharmila Tagore
- Ruma Guha Thakurta, actress whose notable works include Ganashatru, Abhijan, Palatak; wife of Kishore Kumar

== International Beauty Pageants ==
- Sushmita Sen,Miss Universe in 1994

== Artists and designers ==
- Zainul Abedin
- Shahabuddin Ahmed
- Shahidul Alam
- Ramkinkar Baij
- Paromita Banerjee
- Subhankar Banerjee
- Ramaprasad Banik
- Bikash Bhattacharjee
- Chittaprosad Bhattacharya
- Atul Bose
- Nandalal Bose
- Jayasri Burman
- Sudipto Chatterjee
- Jogen Chowdhury
- Rashid Choudhury
- Sunil Das
- Sunayani Devi
- Mukul Dey
- Sanatan Dinda
- Anil Kumar Dutta
- Pablo Ganguli
- Asit Kumar Haldar
- Somnath Hore
- Firoz Mahmud
- Paresh Maity
- Hemen Majumdar
- Kshitindranath Mazumdar
- Anjolie Ela Menon
- Rabin Mondal
- Samir Mondal
- Benode Behari Mukherjee
- Sabyasachi Mukherjee
- Ganesh Pyne
- Devajyoti Ray
- Shyamal Dutta Ray
- Jamini Roy
- Paritosh Sen
- Arpita Singh
- Subhaprasanna
- SM Sultan
- Abanindranath Tagore
- Gaganendranath Tagore
- Rabindranath Tagore

== Painters ==
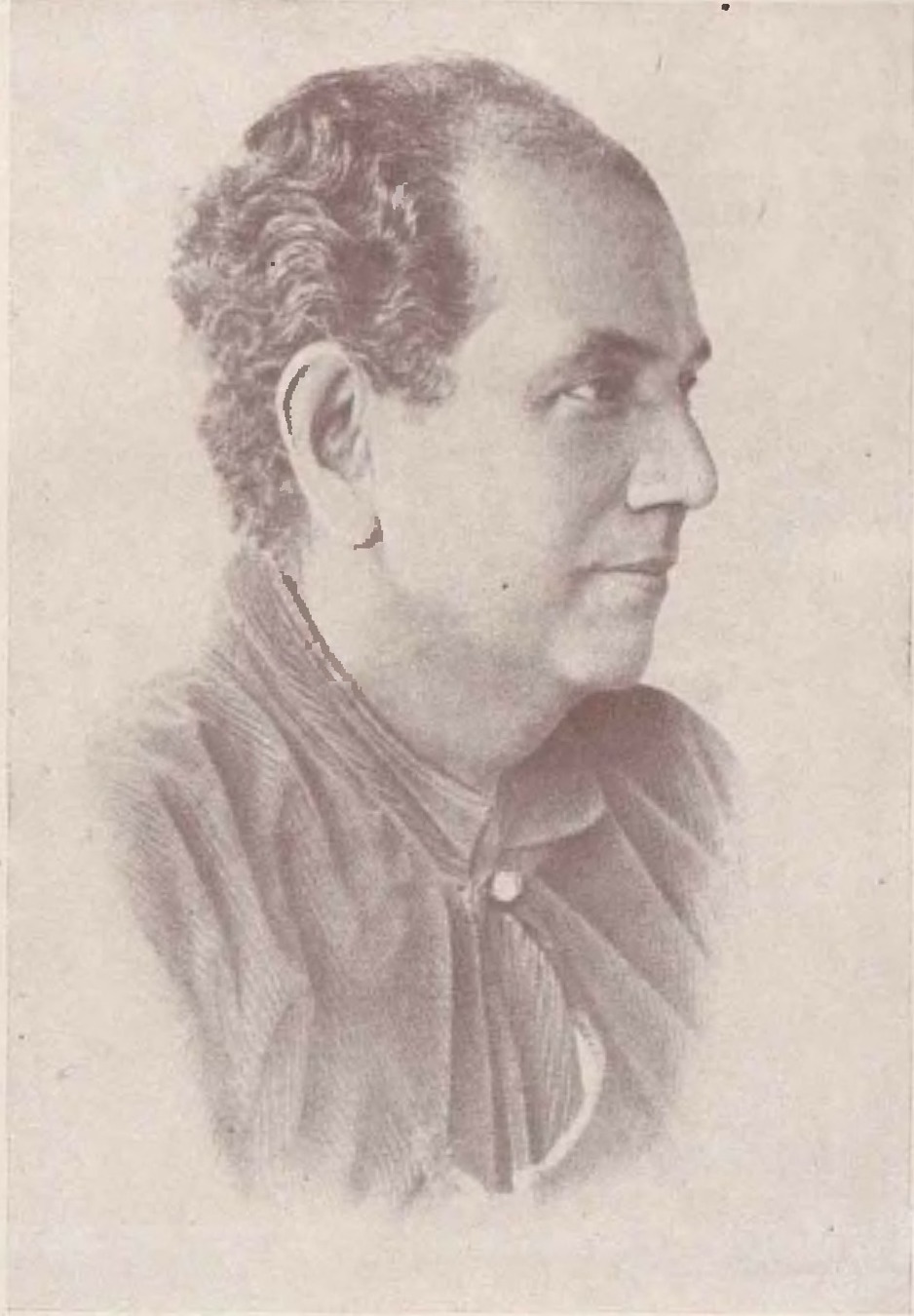
- Abanindranath Tagore
  Abanindranath Tagore
- Abdur Razzaque
- Anjolie Ela Menon
- Aminul Islam
- Bijan Choudhury
- Bikash Bhattacharjee
- Biman Bihari Das
- Bireswar Sen
- Benode Behari Mukherjee
- Dilara Begum Jolly
- Ganesh Pyne
- Hamidur Rahman
- Hashem Khan
- Jagadish Chandra Dey
- Jamini Roy
- Jogen Chowdhury
- Kalipada Ghoshal
- Kanhai Chitrakar
- Karuna Shaha
- Kisory Roy
- Manishi Dey
- Monirul Islam
- Mukul Dey
- Mustafa Monwar
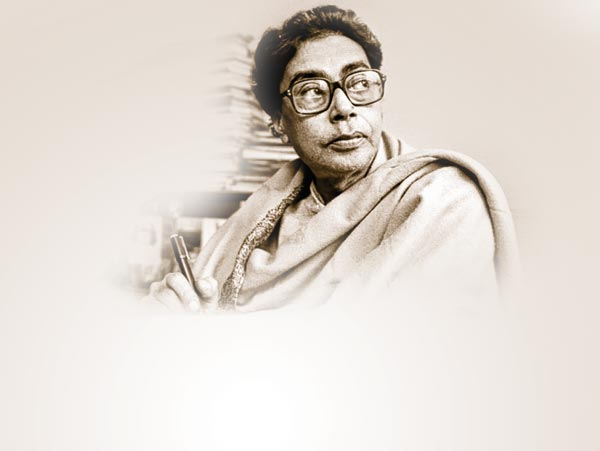
- Ganesh Pyne
  Nandalal Bose
- Nirode Mazumdar
- Nitun Kundu
- Paresh Maity
- Prokash Karmakar
- Qayyum Chowdhury
- Rabindranath Tagore
- Rafiqun Nabi
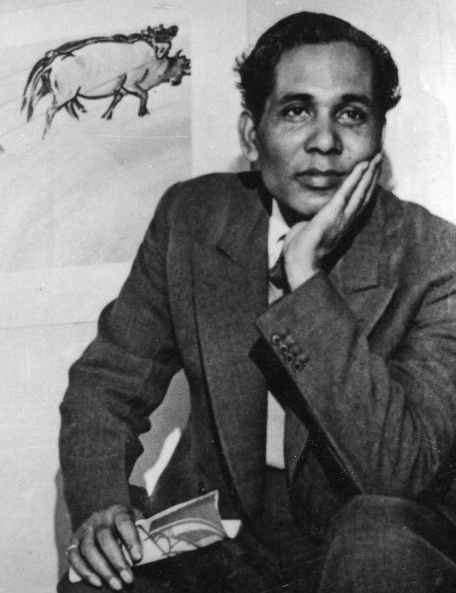
- Zainul Abedin
  Rashid Choudhury
- Rina Banerjee
- Samir Mondal
- Somnath Hore
- Shanu Lahiri
- Shyamal Dutta Ray
- Shishir Bhattacharjee
- Shahabuddin Ahmed
- SM Sultan
- Sudhir Khastgir
- Sunayani Devi
- Subhaprasanna
- Syful Islam
- Uma Bardhan
- Upendrakishore Ray Chowdhury
- Zainul Abedin

== Bharat Ratna Receivers ==
List of Bengalis who received Bharat Ratna:

- By Jawaharlal Nehru, Indian National Congress
  - 1961 Bidhan Chandra Roy (Patna, Bengal Presidency, now Bihar, India)
- By P. V. Narasimha Rao, Indian National Congress
  - 1992 Satyajit Ray (Calcutta, Bengal Presidency, now West Bengal, India)
  - 1997 Aruna Asaf Ali (Kalka, Punjab, British India,(now in Haryana, India)
- By Atal Bihari Vajpayee, Bharatiya Janata Party, NDA
  - 1999 Amartya Sen (Shantiniketan, Bengal Presidency, now Bolpur, West Bengal, India)
  - 1999 Ravi Shankar (Varanasi, Benares State, now Varanasi, Uttar Pradesh, India)
- By Narendra Modi, Bharatiya Janata Party, NDA
  - 2019 Pranab Mukherjee (Birbhum, Bengal, now West Bengal)

== Bloggers / media artists ==
- Hasan M. Elahi, interdisciplinary media artist
- Pritish Nandy, poet, author, editor in chief of The Illustrated Weekly of India as well as Publishing Director and Managing Editor of The Times of India Group
- Reihan Salam, journalist, blogger at The American Scene and associate editor of The Atlantic Monthly

== Business and industry ==
=== Billionaires ===
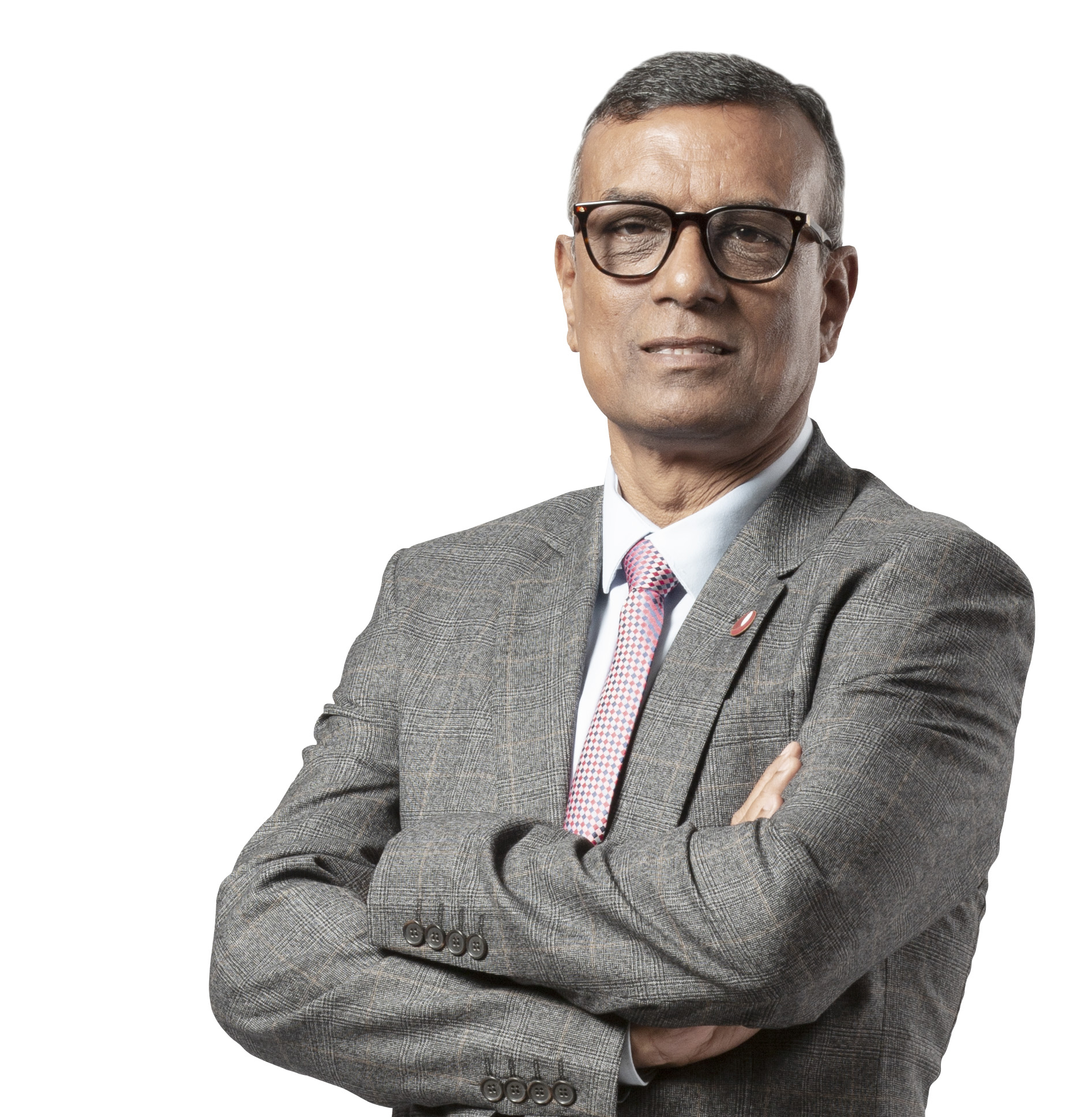
- Chandra Shekhar Ghosh,CEO of Bandhan Bank
  Sanjit Biswas, Indian American entrepreneur and CEO/ Co-founder of Samsara (company), built and sold Meraki to Cisco for $1.2 billion.
- Ankiti Bose, Founder of Zilingo
- Purnendu Chatterjee, Founder & Chairman, TCG Group, that owns Haldia Petrochemicals
- Tapan Chowdhury, CEO and MD of Square Pharmaceuticals, Square Group, Square Hospital and Maasranga Television
- Chandra Shekhar Ghosh, Founder, Managing Director & CEO of Bandhan Bank
- Pradeep Kar, Founder of Microland
- Mohammad Aziz Khan, a Singaporean and Bengali billionaire industrialist, founder and chairman of the Summit Group
- Robin Khuda, founder of AirTrunk
- Salman F Rahman, Founder & Vice Chairman of BEXIMCO
- Sunil Kanti Roy, Founder of Peerless Group
- Aveek Sarkar, Vice Chairman & Editor Emeritus, Ananda Bazaar Patrika
- Ahmed Akbar Sobhan, Founder and Chairman of the Bashundhara Group

=== Business leaders ===
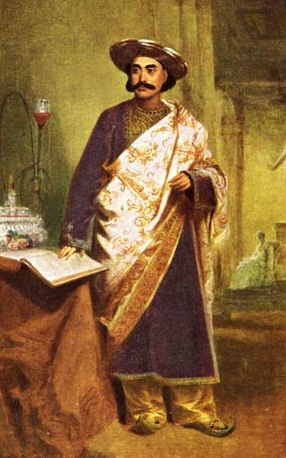
- Prince Dwarkanath Tagore,one of the first Indian industrialists to partner with the British East India Company
  Iqbal Ahmed OBE, entrepreneur and CEO of Seamark Group. In 2006, he became the highest British Bangladeshi to feature on the Sunday Times Rich List (listed at number 511). He has a net worth of $250 million.
- Syed Ahmed, British entrepreneur, businessman, television personality
- Subroto Bagchi, an Indian entrepreneur who is the co-founder of Mindtree, an Indian technology MNC.
- Prith Banerjee, CTO of ANSYS, former director of HP Labs
- Arundhati Bhattacharya, chairperson and CEO of Salesforce India and first woman director of State Bank of India
- Kumar Bhattacharyya, Baron Bhattacharyya, Director, Warwick Manufacturing Group
- Amar Bose founder of bose audio
- Mohammad Ebadul Karim Bulbul, managing director of Beacon Pharmaceuticals
- Sankar Chakraborti, Group CEO of Acuité Ratings and Research and founder of India's first ESG rating company, ESG Risk Assessments and Insights
- Purnendu Chatterjee, the founder and chairman of The Chatterjee Group (TCG) and also serves as a member of the Governing Board of the Indian School of Business (ISB) in Hyderabad.
- Moorad Choudhry, former managing director, Head of Business Treasury and Global Banking & Markets at Royal Bank of Scotland
- Mamun Chowdhury, businessman, and founder and co-director of London Tradition. In 2014, the company was awarded a Queen's Award for Enterprise for International Trade in recognition of its increase in sales.
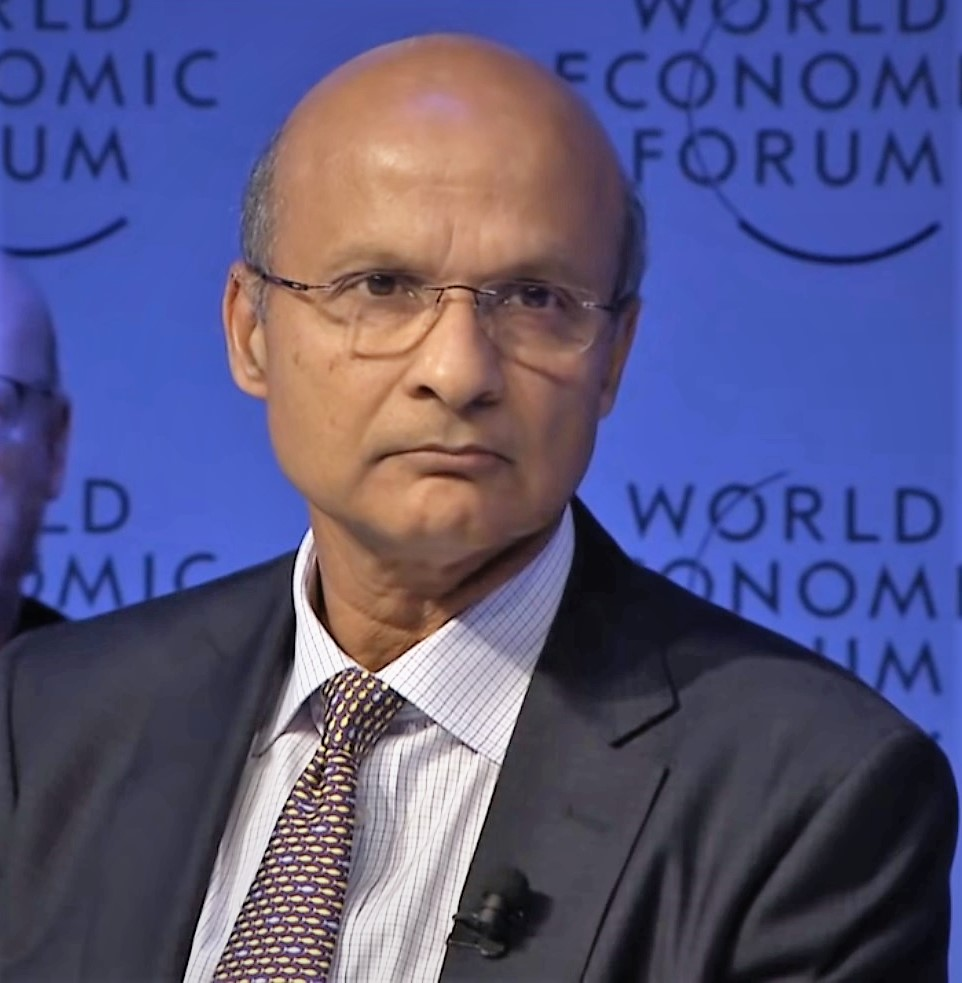
- Omar Ishrak,serving as the chairman of the board for Intel, since January 2020.
  Alamohan Das, industrialist, businessman and founder of India Machinery co, namesake of Dasnagar, Howrah
- Rono Dutta, CEO of IndiGo
- Ashok Sekhar Ganguly, former chairman, Hindustan Unilever
- Aditya Ghosh, Co Founder of Akasa Air, Co Founder of Chourangi restaurant in London, former CEO (2008–2018) of IndiGo, Board Director of Oyo Rooms and Fabindia
- Anirvan Ghosh, CEO of Unity Biotechnology
- Asim Ghosh, former CEO of Husky Energy
- Chandra Shekhar Ghosh, former MD and CEO of Bandhan Bank.
- Rajat Gupta, first foreign-born Managing Director (chief executive) of management consultancy firm McKinsey & Company from 1994 to 2003; sentenced to two years of prison in 2012 for insider trading
- Omar Ishrak, chairman, Intel
- Mahee Ferdous Jalil, founder of Channel S, owner of Prestige Auto Group and TV presenter
- Sir Rajendra Nath Mookerjee, Founder of Martin & Co.
- Bhaskar Pramanik, chairman, Microsoft India
- Subir Raha, former head, ONGC
- Fayzur Rahman, chairman of Novoair
- M. A. Sattar, prominent industrialist. Founder and former chairman of Sattar Jute Mills and other enterprises, banker, and politician
- Ramdulal Sarkar, merchant and foremost name in the Indo American maritime trade from late 18th to early 19th century
- Mutty Lall Seal, businessman and entrepreneur
- Dwarkanath Tagore, known for partnership with the British East India Company

=== Entrepreneurs ===
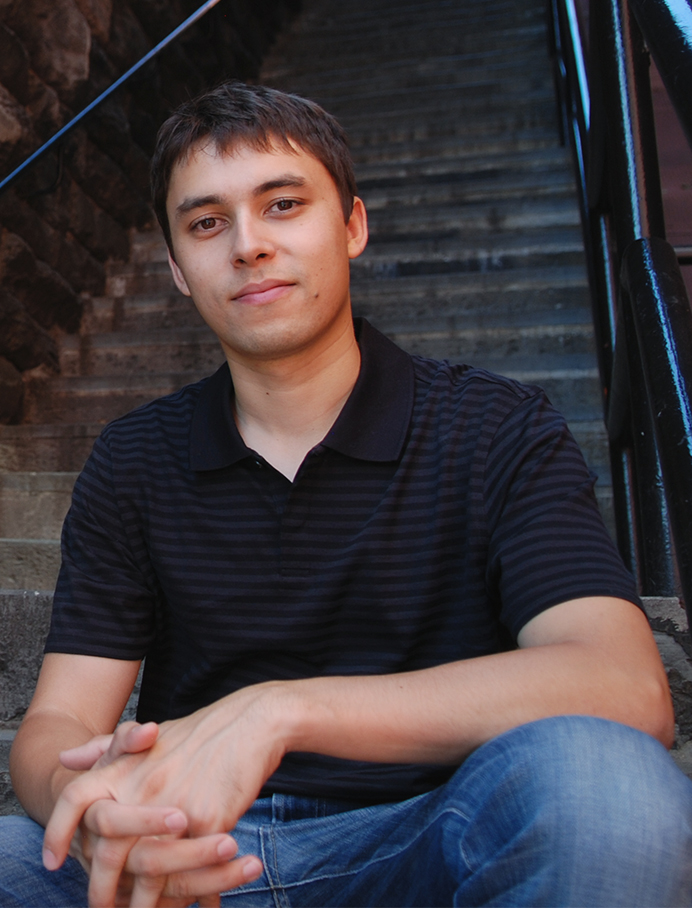
- Jawed Karim,Bangladeshi descent American entrepreneur,one of the co-founder of YouTube
  Muquim Ahmed, banking, travel, a chain of restaurants with the Cafe Naz group, publishing and property development.
- Badruddin Ajmal, managing director of Ajmal Perfumes and Lok Sabha MP from Dhubri, Assam
- Enam Ali, founder of the British Curry Awards, Spice Business Magazine and Ion TV
- Ragib Ali, industrialist, pioneer tea-planter, educationalist, philanthropist and banker who has a net worth of $250 million.
- Subroto Bagchi, founder and former chairman, Mindtree
- Siddhartha Basu, founder and CMD of BIG Synergy
- Amar Bose, founder of Bose Corporation
- Amjad Khan Chowdhury, founder of PRAN-RFL Group
- Foysol Choudhury MBE, businessman, community activist and Chairman of Edinburgh and Lothians Regional Equality Council
- Anjan Chatterjee, founder, Speciality Group of Restaurants
- Bicky Chakraborty, Sweden's biggest hotelier; President and founder of Elite Hotels of Sweden and The Bishop's Arms
- Bicky Chakraborty,Indian-born Swedish businessman,president and founder of Elite Hotels of Sweden and The Bishop's Arms,one of the richest men in Scandinavia
  Alamohan Das, founder, India Machinery Company
- Sadhan Dutt, founder, Development Consultants of Kuljian Group
- Samit Ghosh, founder, MD and CEO of Ujjivan Small Finance Bank
- Snehasish Ganguly, Director of NK Gossain & Co., brother of former Indian cricket team captain and current Board of Control for Cricket in India President, Sourav Ganguly
- M. A. Hashem, founder and chairman of Partex Group
- Shelim Hussain, founder of Euro Foods (UK)
- Jawed Karim, co-founder of YouTube, first person to upload a video to the site
- Nitun Kundu, founder of Otobi
- Abdul Latif, British restaurateur known for his dish "Curry Hell"
- Ayub Ali Master, founder of the Shah Jalal Restaurant in London which became a hub for the early British Asian community.
- Tommy Miah MBE, celebrity chef, restaurateur and founder of the Indian Chef of the Year Competition.
- Rajendra Nath Mookerjee, co-founder, Martin Burn Ltd, IISCO
- Sabyasachi Mukherjee, founder & Managing Director of luxury Indian fashion brand, Sabyasachi
- Rajat Neogy, founder and editor, Transition Magazine in Kampala, Uganda in 1961
- Diptendu Pramanick, founder, Secretary of Eastern India Motion Pictures Association (EIMPA)
- Kamal Quadir, founder and CEO of CellBazaar Inc, first Mover Fellow of the Aspen Institute, TEDIndia Fellow
- Shah Abdul Majid Qureshi, restaurateur
- Bajloor Rashid MBE, businessman and former president of the Bangladesh Caterers Association UK
- Arjun Ray (PVSM, VSM), founder, managing director and chief executive officer of the Indus Trust and Indus International Schools
- Neeraj Roy, co-founder, Hungama Digital Media Entertainment Pvt. Ltd.
- Prannoy Roy, founder, NDTV
- Subrata Roy, founder and chairman, Sahara India Pariwar
- Sunil Kanti Roy, managing director of Peerless Group
- Chiki Sarkar, founder and Publisher of Juggernaut Books
- Barun Sengupta, founder of Bartaman
- Moosa Bin Shamsher, founder of GATCO
- Iqbal Quadir, founder of Grameenphone and bKash
- Muhammad Yunus, founder of Grameen Bank, "father of micro-finance", Nobel laureate

== Sahitya Akademi Award ==
- Jibanananda Das
- Tarashankar Bandopadhyay
- Premendra Mitra
- Parashuram
- Gajendra Kumar Mitra
- Shashibhusan Dasgupta
- Annada Shankar Ray
- Buddhadeb Basu
- Abu Sayeed Ayyub
- Santosh Kumar Ghosh
- Shankha Ghosh
- Mahashweta Devi
- Samaresh Basu
- Shakti Chattopadhyay
- Samaresh Majumdar
- Sunil Gangopadhyay
- Shirshendu Mukhopadhyay
- Moti Nandi
- Amiya Bhushan Majumdar
- Syed Mustafa Siraj
- Nabarun Bhattacharya
- Nabaneeta Dev Sen
- Shankar

== Cartoonists / comics creators ==
- Jayanto Banerjee, Indian cartoonist and illustrator
- Neelabh Banerjee, Indian cartoonist and illustrator
- Sarnath Banerjee, graphic story writer, co-founded the comics publishing house Phantomville
- Samit Basu, comics writer at Virgin Comics
- Suddhasattwa Basu, illustrator
- Chittaprosad Bhattacharya, Indian cartoonist
- Rimi B. Chatterjee, graphic story writer
- Shamik Dasgupta, graphic story writer
- Narayan Debnath, creator of Nonte Phonte, Batul the Great, Handa Bhonda
- Chandi Lahiri, cartoonist and painter
- Satyajit Ray, filmmaker, creator of comic characters like Feluda and Professor Shonku
- Atanu Roy, illustrator
- Gaganendranath Tagore, cartoonist and painter

== Cinematographers ==
- Ayananka Bose
- Sudeep Chatterjee
- Subrata Mitra
- Avik Mukhopadhyay
- Soumendu Roy

== Criminals ==
- Haris Ahmed, a Bangladeshi national and fugitive convicted of murder. He is known for his involvement in organised crime in Dhaka during the 1990s.
- Sweden Aslam is a Bangladeshi gangster who is convicted of 22 cases including 9 murders from the mid-1980s until he was apprehended in 1997.
- Steve Banerjee, convicted arsonist, racketeer, and murderer, and co-founder of Chippendales
- Bangla Bhai or Siddique ul-Islam, a Bangladeshi Radical Extremist and terrorist and the military commander of the Al Qaeda affiliated radical Islamist terrrorist organization Jagrata Muslim Janata Bangladesh.He orchestrated a campaign of torture and executions in northwestern Bangladesh before being captured and executed by hanging in 2007.
- Dhananjoy Chatterjee, first person judicially executed in India in the 21st century for murder.
- Mufti Abdul Hannan, was a Bangladeshi Islamist militant, convicted terrorist the former chief of Harkat-ul-Jihad al-Islami Bangladesh (HuJI-B), a banned extremist organization. He played a central role in orchestrating numerous terrorist attacks in Bangladesh between 1999 and 2005, resulting in the deaths of over 100 people, executed in 2017.
- Roshu Kha, serial killer
- Shaykh Abdur Rahman, founder of banned Jamaat-ul-Mujahideen Bangladesh. He coordinated the coordinated August 2005 countrywide bombings across Bangladesh and was executed alongside Bangla Bhai in 2007.
- Boro Sazzad is a fugitive gangster, leading organised crimes including mass murder and extortion in Chittagong since 1999. An Interpol notice has been issued against him.
- Ershad Sikder, criminal and serial killer

== Dadasaheb Phalke Award winners ==
- Raichand Boral
- Nitin Bose
- Kanan Devi
- Manna Dey
- Mithun Chakraborty
- Soumitra Chatterjee
- Dhirendra Nath Ganguly
- Ashok Kumar
- Hrishikesh Mukherjee
- Pankaj Mullick
- Devika Rani, was the first recipient of the Dadasaheb Phalke Award and was awarded the Padma Shri. Widely acknowledged as the First Lady of Indian cinema.
- Satyajit Ray
- Mrinal Sen
- Tapan Sinha
- B. N. Sircar

== Diplomats ==
- Arindam Bagchi, India's Permanent Representative to the United Nations at Geneva.
- Pinak Ranjan Chakravarty, retired Indian diplomat and former High Commissioner of India to Bangladesh.
- Sandeep Chakravorty, Ambassador of India to Indonesia,former Ambassador of India to Peru.
- Atul Chandra Chatterjee, former ambassador to the UK
- Riva Ganguly Das, former High Commissioner of India to Bangladesh.
- Chandrashekhar Dasgupta, former ambassador to China
- Munshi Mohammad Fazle Kader, Assistant High Commissioner to Pakistan
- Bhupendra Nath Mitra, former ambassador to the UK
- Siddhartha Shankar Ray, former ambassador to the US
- Binay Ranjan Sen, former ambassador to the US
- Ronen Sen, former ambassador to the US and UK
- Samar Sen (diplomat), served as the 1st permanent representative to the United Nations, Geneva and former President of the United Nations Security Council.

== Economists ==
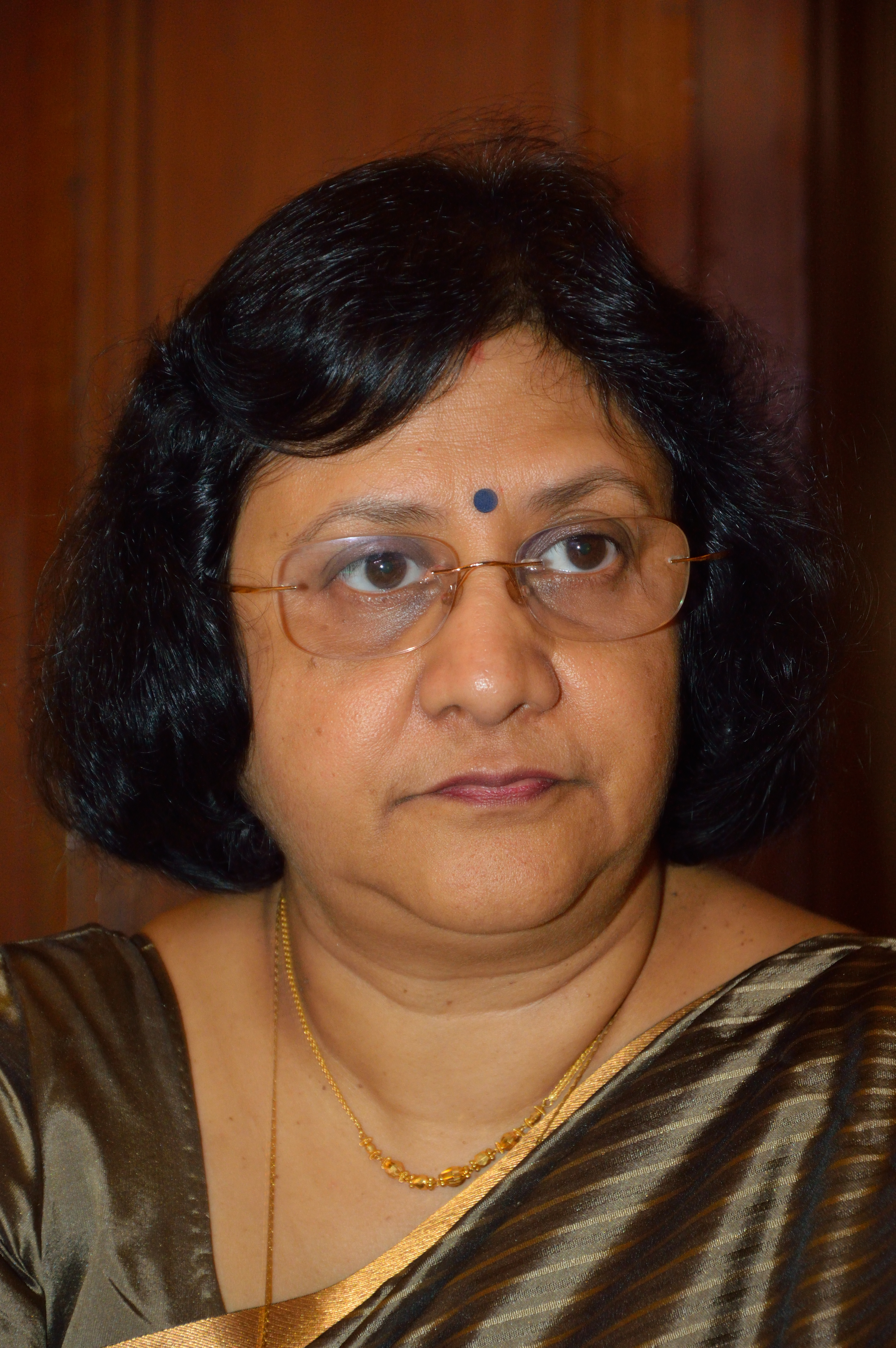
Arundhati Bhattacharya,retired Indian banker and former Chairperson of the State Bank of India,ranked 25th most influential woman in the world by Forbes

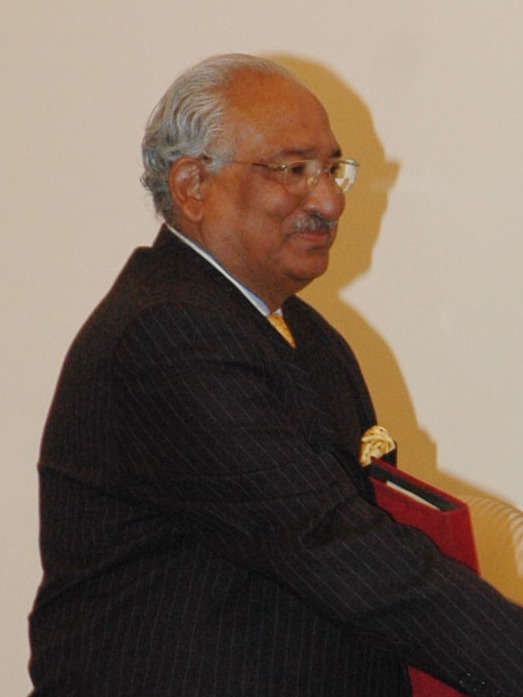
In 1994, Saifur Rahman was elected governor of the golden jubilee conference of the World Bank and International Monetary Fund in Madrid, Spain.

- Salahuddin Ahmed, 9th governor of Bangladesh Bank
- Mir Masoom Ali, George and Frances Ball Distinguished Professor Emeritus of Statistics, Ball State University
- Abhijit Banerjee, Ford Foundation International Professor of Economics, Massachusetts Institute of Technology, co-founder of the Abdul Latif Jameel Poverty Action Lab, winner of Nobel Prize
- Pranab Bardhan, professor of economics, University of California, Berkeley, has been on the editorial board of a number of economics journals
- Kaushik Basu, Chief Economist, World Bank; C. Marks Professor of International Studies and Professor of Economics, Cornell University
- Arundhati Bhattacharya, first woman director of SBI, largest bank in India
- P.C. Bhattacharya, former governor of Reserve Bank of India
- Amitava Bose, professor of economics at the Indian Institute of Management, Calcutta
- Suma Chakrabarti, President of European Bank for Reconstruction and Development
- Shegufta Bakht Chaudhuri, 4th governor of Bangladesh Bank
- Amiya Kumar Dasgupta, one of the founders, in 1949, of the internationally known journal The Economic Weekly (current name, Economic and Political Weekly)
- Partha Dasgupta, FRS, Frank Ramsey Professor Emeritus of Economics, University of Cambridge
- Bibek Debroy, economist and linguist, author of Sanskrit titbits blog
- Romesh Chunder Dutt, Indian civil servant economic historian
- Mohammed Farashuddin, 7th governor of Bangladesh Bank, founder of East West University
- Anil Kumar Gain, statistician from the University of Cambridge, Fellow of the Royal Society
- Maitreesh Ghatak, current editor of Journal of Development Economics; contributions in microfinance, property pights, public organizations
- Amitav Ghosh, former governor of Reserve Bank of India
- N. C. Sen Gupta, former governor of Reserve Bank of India
- Nurul Islam, economist, former chairman, Bangladesh Planning Commission
- Akbar Ali Khan, economist
- Shah A M S Kibria, economist, diplomat and former executive secretary of the United Nations' ESCAP
- Prasanta Chandra Mahalanobis, founder of Indian Statistical Institute
- Syed Abdul Majid, pioneer of the agricultural industry of Bengal & Assam, first minister of Assam
- Abul Maal Abdul Muhith, former Finance Minister of Bangladesh
- Saifur Rahman, longest serving Finance Minister of Bangladesh and a leader of BNP
- Debraj Ray, Silver Professor of Economics, New York University; co-editor of the American Economic Review; has served on the editorial board of several international journals
- Amartya Sen, economist and philosopher, Lamont Professor at Harvard University, winner of the Nobel Prize
- Rehman Sobhan, economist, Chairman of the Center for Policy Dialogue (CPD)
- Muhammad Yunus, economist, founder of Grameen Bank, winner of the Nobel Prize

== Espionage ==
- Maloy Krishna Dhar, intelligence officer and spymaster
- Surajit Kar Purkayastha, spy and spymaster. Went to Iran as a Research and Analysis Wing (R&AW) officer and stayed there for 5 years

== Fellows of the Royal Society ==
- Kumar Bhattacharyya
- Jagdish Chandra Bose
- Satyendra Nath Bose
- Partha Dasgupta
- Anil Kumar Gain
- Prasanta Chandra Mahalanobis
- Ashesh Prasad Mitra
- Sisir Kumar Mitra
- Mahendranath Roy
- Sharat Kumar Roy
- Meghnad Saha
- Ashoke Sen

== Fictional characters ==
- Misir Ali
- Arjun (character)
- Nilkantha Bagchi
- Byomkesh Bakshi
- Parashor Barma
- P. K. Basu
- Bantul the Great
- Baker Bhai
- Handa Bhonda
- Chandramukhi
- Shankar Ray Choudhuri
- Devdas
- Feluda
- Harshabardhan and Gobardhan
- Ghanada
- Gogol (character)
- Goopy Gyne
- Bagha Byne
- Lalmohan Ganguly (Jatayu)
- Harke Haldar
- Himu
- Kakababu
- Mitin Masi
- Masud Rana
- Kiriti Roy
- Tarini Khuro
- Nonte Phonte
- Rijuda
- Banalata Sen
- Professor Shonku
- Shuvro
- Tenida
- Enigma / Tara Virango

== Filmmakers ==
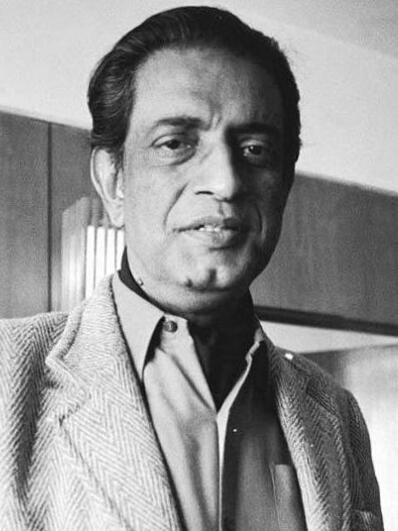
Satyajit Ray,iconic Indian film director, screenwriter, author, lyricist, magazine editor, illustrator, calligrapher, and composer

- Humayun Ahmed
- San Banarje
- Dibakar Banerjee
- Anurag Basu
- Aditya Bhattacharya
- Basu Bhattacharya
- Sachin Bhowmick
- Debaki Bose
- Nitin Bose
- Satyen Bose
- Pritish Chakraborty
- Raj Chakraborty
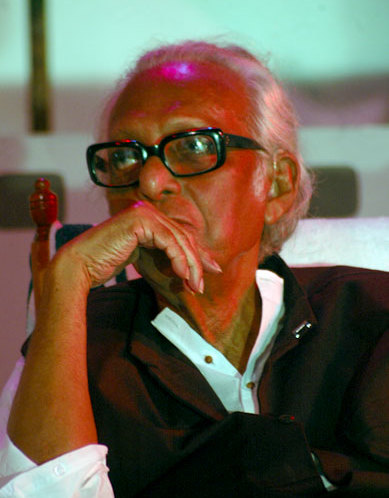
- Mrinal Sen
  Amiya Chakravarty
- Pramod Chakravorty
- Basu Chatterjee
- Birsa Dasgupta
- Buddhadeb Dasgupta
- Chidananda Dasgupta
- Dipankar Dipon
- Anjan Dutt
- Guru Dutt
- Subhash Dutta
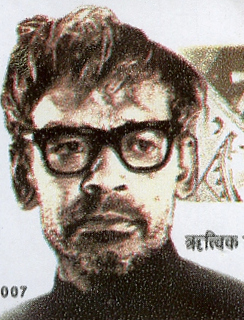
- Ritwik Ghatak
  Mostofa Sarwar Farooki
- Samir Ganguly
- Ritwik Ghatak
- Gautam Ghose
- Ken Ghosh
- Ranjan Ghosh
- Rituporno Ghosh
- Shashanka Ghosh
- Sujoy Ghosh
- Dulal Guha
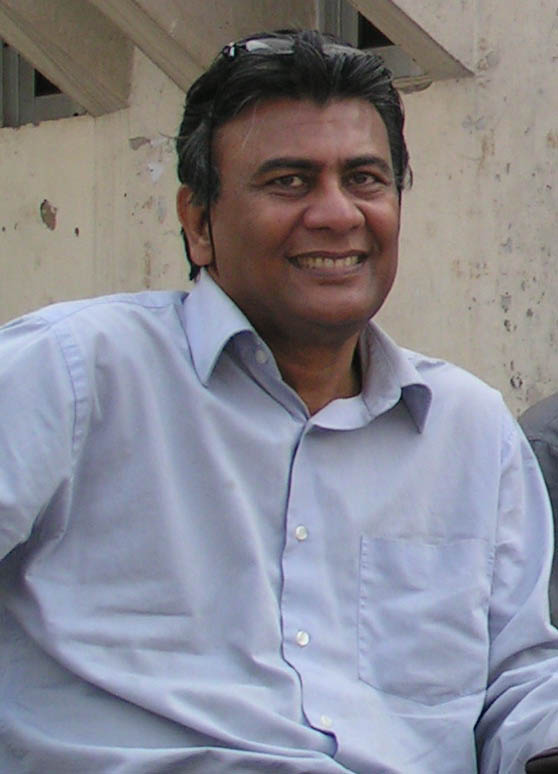
- Tareque Masud,Bangladeshi film director
  Amjad Hossain
- Chashi Nazrul Islam
- Ajoy Kar
- Farha Khatun
- Phani Majumdar
- Tarun Majumdar
- Tareque Masud
- Premendra Mitra
- Shibu Mitra
- Sombhu Mitra
- Tanvir Mokammel
- Sujit Mondal
- Gyan Mukherjee
- Hrishikesh Mukherjee
- Ram Mukherjee
- Sashadhar Mukherjee
- Shiboprosad Mukherjee
- Shomu Mukherjee
- Subodh Mukherjee
- Ayan Mukerji
- Hiren Nag
- Biren Nag
- Niranjan Pal
- Raihan Rafi
- Mujibar Rahaman
- Himanshu Rai
- Zahir Raihan
- Sandip Ray
- Satyajit Ray
- Amitabh Reza
- Bimal Roy
- Sudhendu Roy
- Shakti Samanta
- Pradeep Sarkar
- Asit Sen
- Mrinal Sen
- Raja Sen
- Partho Sen-Gupta
- Tapan Sinha
- Shoojit Sircar
- Manick Sorcar
- Shashwati Talukdar
- Nasiruddin Yousuff

== Grammy winners ==
- Sandeep Das, award for Best World Music Album, at the 59th Grammy Awards, 2017
- Norah Jones, 9-time winner
- Ravi Shankar, 5-time winner

== Journalists ==
=== Bangladesh ===
- Shah Alamgir, journalist
- Syed Mohammad Ali, founder of The Daily Star – the largest circulating daily English-language newspaper in Bangladesh.
- Mahfuz Anam
- Abul Asad
- Nurjahan Begum
- Salah Choudhury, editor of Weekly Blitz
- Sanjeeb Choudhury
- Shamim Chowdhury, TV and print journalist for Al Jazeera English
- Lenin Gani, senior member of the Bangladesh Sports Journalists Association
- Abdul Hafiz, writer, essayist and journalist
- Shahriar Kabir
- Abed Khan
- Sirajul Hossain Khan, editor of Pakistan Times and the Eastern News Agency.
- Fazle Lohani
- A B M Musa
- Syed Nahas Pasha, journalist and editor of Janomot and Curry Life
- Abdul Quadir, poet, essayist and journalist
- Matiur Rahman
- Manik Chandra Saha
- Ataus Samad
- Shykh Seraj
- Hassan Shahriar, journalist

=== India ===
- Anjan Bandyopadhyay,was an Indian Bengali journalist who worked for various news and media channels
- Kishalay Bhattacharjee, Former resident editor NDTV.
- Gautam Bhattacharya, sports journalist, a published author and a cricket commentator on Star Sports.
- Ramananda Chatterjee, "father of Indian journalism"
- Shoma Chaudhury, an Indian journalist, editor, and political commentator.
- Swapan Dasgupta, journalist
- Sunanda K. Datta-Ray, journalist
- Sagarika Ghose, editor at CNN-IBN
- Gour Kishore Ghosh, an Indian writer and journalist in Bengali.Associated with Anandabazar Patrika for decades, Ghosh was known for his novels Desh Mati Manush and Prem Nei. He was the first editor of Aajkaal.
- Chandan Mitra, editor and managing director of The Pioneer newspaper
- Udayan Mukherjee, editor and anchor in CNBC India
- Pritish Nandy, Publishing Director and Managing Editor, The Times of India Group; Editor in Chief, The Illustrated Weekly of India; chairman, Pritish Nandy Communications Ltd
- Prannoy Roy, founder and President of NDTV, one of India's largest television and media production houses
- Samar Sen, journalist
- Barun Sengupta, political critic, founder-editor of Bartaman newspaper
- Vishnu Som, news anchor and journalist

=== America ===
- Sanjiv Bhattacharya
- Bobby Ghosh (Aparisim Ghosh), journalist, former TIME magazine World Editor; the first non-American to be named World Editor in TIME's more than 80 years
- Reihan Salam

=== United Kingdom ===
- Fareena Alam
- Lisa Aziz, British television news presenter
- Mihir Bose, BBC's head sports editor
- Reeta Chakrabarti, political correspondent for the BBC Television's Breakfast programme shown on BBC One and the BBC News Channel
- Mo Dutta, former TV presenter for BBC Radio 2, BBC Asian Network, BBC Radio Kent
- Pallab Ghosh, BBC News science reporter
- Nina Hossain, British television news broadcaster
- Faisal Islam, current Economics Editor of BBC News. Former Political Editor of Sky News
- Tasmin Lucia-Khan, English journalist and television presenter
- Hasina Momtaz, former press officer for the Mayor of London
- Sarah Mukherjee, former BBC Environment Correspondent, currently a regular contributor on Radio 4's Today programme

=== Pakistan ===
- Zaib-un-Nissa Hamidullah, Pakistan's first female editor; first woman to be included in a press delegation; in 1955, became the first woman to speak at the ancient al Azhar University in Cairo, Egypt
- Altaf Husain, 1st editor-in-chief of Pakistan's oldest, leading and most widely read English-language newspaper, Dawn and former Industry Minister of Pakistan

=== Qatar ===
- Shiulie Ghosh, television journalist at Al Jazeera English

=== Uganda ===
- Rajat Neogy, journalist, poet, columnist, founding editor of Transition Magazine

== Law ==
- Syed Ameer Ali, prominent Indian (British Indian) lawyer, key jurist of Muslim personal law, founding member of All India Muslim League
- Kalyan Banerjee, Rotary International's 101st president
- Gooroodas Banerjee, former High Court judge, Calcutta
  Chittaranjan Das,'Deshbandhu',who is famous for Alipore Bomb Case
- Mahmudul Amin Choudhury, 11th chief justice of Bangladesh
- Chittaranjan Das, barrister and Indian independence activist, represented the accused in the Alipore Bomb case
- Sudhi Ranjan Das, former chief justice of India
- Monomohun Ghose, first practising barrister of Indian origin
- Kamal Hossain, the author of Bangladeshi Constitution and icon of secular democracy in South Asia; prominent international lawyer and arbitrator
- Sara Hossain, Bangladeshi lawyer, executive director of BLAST, one of the recipients of the 2016 International Women of Courage Award
- Syed A. B. Mahmud Hossain, 2nd Chief Justice of Bangladesh
- J. R. Mudassir Husain, 14th Chief Justice of Bangladesh
- M Amir-ul Islam, Bangladeshi Lawyer, member of the drafting committee of Bangladeshi constitution
- Altamas Kabir, former Chief Justice of India
- Irene Khan, Bangladeshi lawyer, first woman to be appointed as the United Nations Special Rapporteur for freedom of expression and opinion; seventh Secretary General of Amnesty International (2001–2009); former director-general of the International Development Law Organization
- Muhammed Abdul Muid Khan, nominated as the Best Human Rights Lawyer of England and Wales in 2012
- Nitish Chandra Laharry, first person of Asian origin to be elected as the president of Rotary International
- Sabyasachi Mukharji, former Chief Justice of India
- Bijan Kumar Mukherjea, former Chief Justice of India
- Manmatha Nath Mukherjee, Received Knighthood in 1935, former Justice of Calcutta High Court and appointed Law Secretary of the Government of India
- Abdul Moshabbir, lawyer and politician
- Radhabinod Pal, Indian member appointed to the International Military Tribunal for the Far East, one of the three Asian judges of Tokyo trial
- A. N. Ray, former Chief Justice of India
- Bankim Chandra Ray, former chief justice of India
- Khatun Sapnara, judge and first non-white to be elected to the Family Law Bar Association Committee. In 2006, she was appointed as a Recorder of the Crown, which made her the only person of Bangladeshi origin in a senior judicial position.
- Amal Kumar Sarkar, former Chief Justice of India
- Birendranath Sasmal, barrister and Indian independence activist, defended the accused in the Chittagong armed robbery case
- Abu Sadat Mohammad Sayem, first Chief Justice of Bangladesh
- Amarendra Nath Sen, former judge in Supreme Court of India
- Ashoke Kumar Sen, Indian barrister, former Cabinet minister of India, Indian parliamentarian
- Satyendra Prasanna Sinha, 1st Baron Sinha, prominent lawyer and statesman in British India, first Indian to become member of British cabinet
- Sir Nripendra Nath Sircar KCSI was an Indian lawyer and political figure. He was Advocate-General of Bengal from 1928 to 1934 and Law Member of the Council of the Governor-General of India from 1934 to 1939.

== Magicians ==
- Ganapati Chakraborty
- Jewel Aich
- Maneka Sorcar
- P. C. Sorcar
- P. C. Sorcar, Jr.

== Models and Internet Personalities ==
- Jessia Islam
- Raba Khan
- Sadia Nabila
- Nadir Nibras
- Iftekhar Rafsan
- Rola

== Musicians ==
=== Bangla rock ===
- Shafin Ahmed
- Ayub Bachchu, founding member and the leader of the Bengali rock band Love Runs Blind (LRB)
- Balam
- Partha Barua
- Chandril Bhattacharya, lyricist and one of the founders of the Bangla band Chandrabindoo
- Pradip Chatterjee, vocalist
- Nachiketa Chakraborty
- Anindya Chatterjee, lead vocalist and one of the founders of the Bengali band Chandrabindoo
- Gautam Chattopadhyay, composer, founder of the group Mohiner Ghoraguli, One of the first rock vocalists of India
- Somlata Acharyya Chowdhury, lead singer of Bangla rock band Somlata and The Aces
- Tapas Das, an Indian singer-songwriter and guitarist. He was one of the founding members of the Bengali rock band Moheener Ghoraguli.
- Anjan Dutt, singer, composer and lyricist
- Rupam Islam, frontman of Bengali hard rock band Fossils
- James
- Ibrahim Ahmed Kamal, guitarist for Warfaze, one of the pioneers of Bengali and Bangladeshi heavy metal
- Khan (Azam Khan), one of the pioneers of Bengali rock, pop guru and rock guru of Bangladesh, freedom fighter
- Bappa Mazumder
- Abraham Mazumdar
- Silajit Majumder, an Indian Bengali singer-songwriter from Kolkata.
- Alamgir Haq, former member of the first Bengali Band Iolites, known as the Elvis Presley of the west
- Syed Hasanur Rahman, vocalist of Ark
- Raef al Hasan Rafa
- Kabir Suman
- Sharmin Sultana Sumi, vocalist for Chirkutt
- Sidhu (musician), an Indian singer, lyricist, composer, playback writer from Kolkata.He formed the band Cactus, of which he is the frontman.
- Khaled 'Bassbaba' Sumon, vocalist for Aurthohin
- Tanzir Tuhin, former vocalist of Shironamhin, current vocalist of Avash
- Underground Authority, a rap rock band from Kolkata.
- Ziaur Rahman Zia

=== Bangladeshi film industry ===
- Abdul Alim, National Award-winning playback singer
- Asif Akbar, National Award-winning playback singer
- Partha Barua, singer, musician, composer and actor
- Momtaz Begum, National Award-winning playback singer
- Kumar Biswajit, National Award-winning playback singer and composer
- Ahmed Imtiaz Bulbul, freedom fighter and National Award-winning music director
- Kanak Chapa, National Award-winning playback singer
- Haimanti Rakshit Das, National Award-winning playback singer
- Priyanka Gope, National Award-winning playback singer
- Syed Abdul Hadi, National Award-winning playback singer
- Abdul Jabbar, National Award-winning playback singer
- Alam Khan, National Award-winning music director and composer
- Monir Khan, National Award-winning playback singer
- Andrew Kishore, National Award-winning playback singer
- Runa Laila, National Award-winning playback singer and composer
- Bappa Mazumder, Singer, National Award-winning composer
- Mitali Mukherjee (singer), National Award-winning classical and playback singer
- Anupama Mukti, playback singer
- Mahmudun Nabi, National Award-winning playback singer
- Subir Nandi, National Award-winning playback singer
- Timir Nandi, National Award-winning playback singer
- Baby Nazneen, National Award-winning playback singer
- Farida Parveen, National Award-winning playback singer
- Khan Ataur Rahman, National Award-winning music director and composer
- Shahnaz Rahmatullah, National Award-winning playback singer
- Rathindranath Roy, National Award-winning playback singer,a performer in Swadhin Bangla Betar Kendra.
- Emon Saha, National Award-winning music director and composer
- Satya Saha, National Award-winning music director
- Shithi Saha, playback singer
- S I Tutul, National Award-winning playback singer and composer
- Habib Wahid, National Award-winning music director
- Sabina Yasmin, National Award-winning playback singer

=== Bollywood ===
- Mohammed Aziz, Bollywood playback singer
- Kanika Banerjee
- Abhijeet Bhattacharya, Bollywood playback singer
- Amitabh Bhattacharya, lyricist and singer
- Dhananjay Bhattacharya, singer and composer
- Anil Biswas
- Hemanga Biswas
- Rahul Dev Burman, Bollywood music composer
- Sachin Dev Burman, Bollywood music composer
- Raichand Boral, Bollywood music composer
- Soham Chakraborty, singer
- Anindya Chatterjee, singer-songwriter
- Madhuri Chattopadhyay
- Sabita Chowdhury
- Salil Chowdhury, Bollywood music composer
- Kamal Dasgupta, composer
- Geeta Dutt, Bollywood playback singer
- Gyan Dutt, composer, Bhukt Surdas
- Kanan Devi, singer and actress
- Manna Dey, Bollywood playback singer
- Jeet Ganguly, Tollywood and Bollywood music composer
- Parul Ghosh, Bollywood playback singer
- Anup Ghoshal, Bollywood playback singer
- Shreya Ghoshal, Bollywood playback singer
- Anwesha Datta Gupta, Bollywood playback singer, winner of Amul Star Voice of India, Chhote Ustaad
- Jagmohan singer
- Suman Kalyanpur, Bollywood playback singer
- Ash King, singer
- Krsna composer
- Amit Kumar, playback singer, performer and son of Kishore Kumar
- Kishore Kumar
- Bappi Lahiri, Bollywood music composer
- Madhushree, Bollywood playback singer
- Antara Mitra, Bollywood playback singer
- Shyamal Mitra, composer
- Shantanu Moitra, Bollywood Music composer
- Arko Pravo Mukherjee, singer-songwriter
- Chandrani Mukherjee, Bollywood playback singer
- Jolly Mukherjee, Bollywood playback singer
- Manas Mukherjee, Bollywood music composer, father of Shaan
- Sapna Mukherjee, Bollywood playback singer
- Aarti Mukherji
- Hemanta Kumar Mukhopadhyay
- Sandhya Mukhopadhyay, Bollywood playback singer
- Pankaj Mullick, singer, composer, music director
- Sandeep Nath, lyricist
- Amit Paul, Bollywood playback singer
- Pritam, Bollywood music composer
- Anupam Roy, singer-songwriter
- Kanu Roy, composer
- Sagarika, Hindi, Assamese and Bengali playback and pop singer and actress
- Amit Sana, Bollywood playback singer
- Kumar Sanu, Bollywood playback singer
- Rajanikanta Sen, Bengali poet and composer
- Sohail Sen, Bollywood composer and singer
- Shaan, Hindi and Bengali playback and pop singer, Bollywood actor and television presenter
- Arijit Singh, Bollywood playback singer
- Chitra Singh, singer and composer
- Babul Supriyo, Bollywood playback singer
- Monali Thakur, Bollywood playback singer
- Alka Yagnik, Bollywood playback singer

=== Classical and folk musicians ===
- Abbasuddin Ahmed (1901–1959)
- Abd al-Alim
- Kanika Banerjee (1924–2000), Rabindrasangeet performer
- Nikhil Banerjee (1931–1986), sitar performer
- Firoza Begum (1930–2014), eminent exponent of Nazrul Geeti
- Momtaz Begum (born 1974), Bangladeshi folk singer, world record holder
- Dhananjay Bhattacharya (1922–1992), Shyama Sangeet singer
- Pannalal Bhattacharya (c. 1930 – 1966), singer
- Debabrata Biswas (1911–1980), Rabindrasangeet performer
- Kumar Bose (born 1953), tabla performer and composer
- Tanmoy Bose (born 1963), table master, composer, actor, fusion musician
- Arnab Chakrabarty (born 1980), Indian classical musician, sarod player
- Ajoy Chakrabarty (born 1952)
- Swapan Chaudhuri, tabla exponent
- Pandit Iman Das (born 1982), Indian classical singer and composer.
- Swagatalakshmi Dasgupta, classical and rabindrasangeet exponent performer, also folk modern and devotional music
- Annapurna Devi (1927–2018), surbahar performer
- Naina Devi (1917–1993), Indian classical singer
- Jnan Prakash Ghosh (1909–1997), tabla master, composer and musician
- Shankar Ghosh (1935–2016), tabla master and singer
- Pannalal Ghosh (1911–1960), pioneering master of the Indian classical flute, composer, musicologist
- Shah Abdul Karim (1916–2009)
- Ali Akbar Khan (1922–2009), sarod performer, composer, musicologist, founder of the Ali Akbar College of Music in California, US
- Allauddin Khan (1862–1972)
- Shahadat Hossain Khan (born 1958), Sarod virtuoso, composer, musicologist, international master, renowned Sarod player
- Vilayat Khan (1928–2004), sitar performer
- Runa Laila (born 1952), folk, ghazal, and pop fusion singer
- Lalon (1784–1890), mystic devotional composer and singer
- Abdul Latif
- Suchitra Mitra (1924–2011), Rabindra Sangeet performer, also playback singer and composer
- Kalyan Mukherjea (1943–2010)
- Budhaditya Mukherjee
- Kashinath Mukherjee (1925–2011), Hindustani classical musician and sitar player of Etawah Gharana
- Manabendra Mukhopadhyay (1931–1992), singer and composer
- Farida Parveen (born 1954), Lalon singer
- Hason Raja (1854–1922)
- Purna Das Baul Samrat (born 1933), known as 'Baul-samrat', pioneering folk artist known for working with Bob Dylan
- Ritwik Sanyal (born 1953)
- Indrani Sen, Rabindra Sangeet and Nazrul Geeti performer, also modern and folk songs
- Srabani Sen, Rabindra Sangeet performer, also modern and folk songs
- Anoushka Shankar (born 1981), sitar player and composer
- Ravi Shankar (1920–2012), sitar virtuoso, composer, musicologist
- Chitra Singh, Hindi/Urdu ghazal singer and wife of Jagjit Singh
- Ruma Guha Thakurta (1934–2019), founder and lead singer of Calcutta Youth Choir and playback singer
- Alka Yagnik (born 1966)

=== Hindi rock ===
- Asheem Chakravarty, co-founder of the popular Indian band Indian Ocean
- Palash Sen, lead vocalist of Indian band Euphoria
- Susmit Sen, co-founder of the popular Indian band Indian Ocean

=== Western ===
- Sameer Bhattacharya, lead guitarist of the American alternative rock band Flyleaf
- Futurecop!, electronic band, members include Manzur Iqbal from United Kingdom
- Norah Jones, American singer-songwriter, musician, and actress, daughter of sitar virtuoso Ravi Shankar; Indian Bengali
- Sanjaya Malakar, American born Indian origin singer
- Shikhee, singer; auteur of American industrial band Android Lust
- Mumzy Stranger
- Monica Yunus, operatic soprano

== Military ==
=== Bangladesh ===
- Shakil Ahmed, former head of Bangladesh Rifles
- Mohammad Ruhul Amin, awarded Bir Sreshtho, the highest military award of Bangladesh; war hero of Bangladesh Liberation War
- Saiful Azam, served under Bangladesh Air Force, Iraqi Air Force, Pakistan Air Force and Royal Jordanian Air Force
- Hasan Mashhud Chowdhury, 11th Chief of Army Staff of the Bangladesh Army
- Ismail Faruque Chowdhury, engineer-in-chief of the Bangladesh Army
- Saiful Islam Duke, former Lieutenant Commander of Bangladesh Navy
- Chitta Ranjan Dutta, Bangladeshi war hero and retired Major-General of the Bangladesh Army, key sector commander of the Mukti Bahini during the Bangladesh Liberation War
- Jibon Kanai Das, retired major general of the Bangladesh Army and a veteran of the Bangladesh Liberation War.
- Syed Mohammad Ziaul Haque, Bangladesh Army officer and fugitive
- Nurul Huq, second temporary chief of Bangladesh Navy
- AB Tajul Islam, retired Bangladesh Army captain and former Minister of Liberation War Affairs
- Mohiuddin Jahangir, awarded Bir Sreshtho, the highest military award of Bangladesh, war hero of Bangladesh Liberation War
- Sina Ibn Jamali, former lieutenant general and Chief of General Staff in Army Headquarters
- Mahbub Ali Khan, Bangladesh Navy rear admiral and the Chief of Naval Staff
- Sultan Shahriar Rashid Khan, army officer convicted for the assassination of Sheikh Mujibur Rahman
- Abdul Karim Khandker, Bir Uttam war hero
- Anwarul Momen, general officer commanding 17th Infantry Division
- Khaled Mosharraf, Sector Commander, war hero of Bangladesh Independence War
- Abu Saleh Mohammad Nasim, 7th Chief of Army Staff of the Bangladesh Army
- General M. A. G. Osmani, Supreme Commander of Bangladesh Forces during the Bangladesh Liberation War
- Mohammad Abdur Rab, 1st Chief of Army Staff of the Bangladesh Army, Major general during the Bangladesh Liberation War
- Abul Fazal Ziaur Rahman, physician and army officer martyred in the liberation war
- AKM Asadul Haq, physician and army officer martyred in the liberation war
- Hamidur Rahman, awarded Bir Sreshtho the highest military award of Bangladesh, war hero of Bangladesh Liberation War
- Rahman, awarded Bir Sreshtho the highest military award of Bangladesh, war hero of Bangladesh Liberation War
- Ziaur Rahman, Bir Uttam war hero, Sector Commander, strategic war hero Of 1971 Bangladesh Independence War
- Munshi Abdur Rouf, awarded Bir Sreshtho, the highest military award of Bangladesh; war hero of Bangladesh Liberation War
- Muhammad Ghulam Tawab, Bangladesh's second Chief of Air Staff
- Ashab Uddin, major general and ambassador to Kuwait and Yemen
- Sarwar Hossain, Army General and former Military Secretary to the President of Bangladesh.

=== India ===
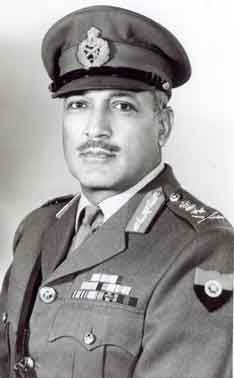
Jayanto Nath Chaudhuri,Chief of army staff of Indian Army,who led India during 1965 Indo-Pakistani War

- Flight Lieutenant Suhas Biswas (1924–1993), recipient of Ashoka Chakra
- Subhas Chandra Bose (1897–1945), leader, Indian National Army
- Air Marshal Padma Bandopadhyay, PVSM, AVSM, VSM, first woman to be promoted to three-star rank in the Indian Air Force
- Air Vice Marshal Madhavendra Banerji (1934–2019), MVC, VM of Indian Air Force
- Major General (Retd.) Dipankar Banerjee (general), Founding Director of the Institute of Peace and Conflict Studies
- Vice Admiral Pradeep Kumar Chatterjee, Indian Navy, later Commander-in-Chief, Andaman and Nicobar Command
- Admiral Adhar Kumar Chatterji (1914–2001), Indian Navy Chief 1966–1970
- General Joyanto Nath Chaudhuri (1908–1983), Indian Army Chief during the Indo-Pakistani War of 1965
- Air Marshal Diptendu Choudhury, is a retired officer of the Indian Air Force. He served as the 32nd Commandant, National Defence College.
- Commodore Ajitendu Chakraverti, Indian Navy, first Indian officer to be promoted to Commodore
- Group Captain Suranjan Das, pioneering test pilot of Indian Air Force
- Vice Admiral Biswajit Dasgupta, AVSM, YSM, VSM, Flag Officer Commanding-in-Chief, Eastern Naval Command
- Lieutenant General (retd.) Abhijit Guha (Indian Army officer), Head of the UN Mission to Support the Hodeidah Agreement
- Wing Commander Karun Krishna Majumdar, Distinguished Flying Cross (United Kingdom) and first Indian to reach the rank of Wing Commander
- Air Commodore Sudhindra Kumar Majumdar (1927–2011), India's first military helicopter pilot
- Colonel Avijit Misra, an Indian Army Colonel
- Air Marshal Subroto Mukherjee (1911–1960), former Head of Indian Air Force
- Major S. K. Mitra, an Indian Army officer from the Army Medical Corps who was martyred in 1962.
- Chief of the Air Staff Designate Arup Raha, 24th chief of Indian Air Force
- Wing Commander Ashis Roy, MD FRCS, first Indian man to complete 100 marathons
- Indra Lal Roy (1898–1918), first Indian (pre Independence) flying ace
- General Shankar Roychowdhury (born 1937), former Indian Army Chief
- Major General Ajit Rudra (1896–1957), OBE
- Lieutenant General Lionel Protip Sen, Distinguished Service Order
- Lieutenant General Anindya Sengupta, is a serving general officer of the Indian Army. He currently serves as the General Officer Commanding-in-Chief Central Command.

=== Other ===
- Abu Hena Saiful Islam (born 1963), Muslim chaplain for the US Navy
- Masum Khan (born 1604), Zamindar of Sarail and soldier of the Mughal empire
- Hayat Mahmud, military general and Zamindar of Buzurg-Umedpur

== Padma Vibhushan ==
- Milon K. Banerji
- Nand Lal Bose
- Satyendra Nath Bose
- Suniti Kumar Chatterji
- D. P. Chattopadhyaya
- Joyanto Nath Chaudhuri
- Bhabatosh Datta
- Niren De
- Basanti Devi
- Ashok Sekhar Ganguly
- Prasanta Chandra Mahalanobis
- Ajoy Mukherjee
- Benode Behari Mukherjee
- Hirendranath Mukherjee
- Hrishikesh Mukherjee
- Pranab Mukherjee
- Basanti Dulal Nagchaudhuri
- Radhabinod Pal
- Satyajit Ray
- Binay Ranjan Sen
- Ravi Shankar
- Uday Shankar

== Political leaders outside of India, Bangladesh and Pakistan ==
=== Australia ===
- Varun Ghosh
- Tanzil Rahman

=== Canada ===
- Doly Begum, MP from Scarborough Southwest
- Shuv Majumdar, Member of Parliament for Calgary Heritage

=== United Kingdom ===
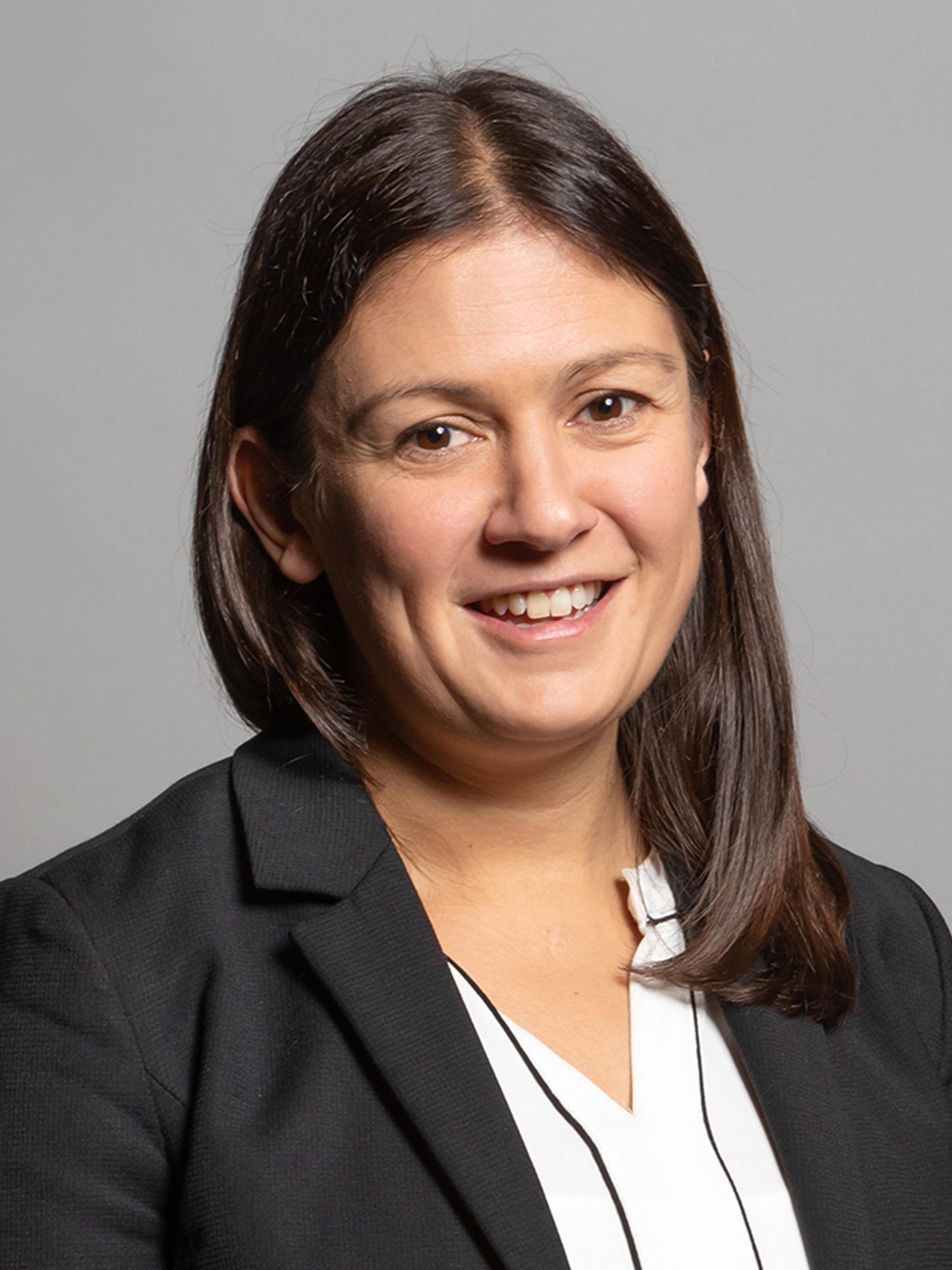
Lisa Nandy,serving as Shadow Secretary of State for Levelling Up, Housing and Communities since 2021

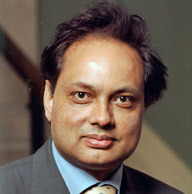
Anwar Choudhury was the first non-white British person to be appointed in a senior diplomatic post.

- Marina Masuma Ahmad, Member of the London Assembly for Lambeth and Southwark
- Nasim Ali OBE, Labour Party politician, councillor in Regent's Park ward, Cabinet Member for Young People in Camden Council and former Mayor of Camden; in 2003, at age 34, became UK's youngest mayor as well as the first Bangladeshi and first Muslim mayor
- Rushanara Ali MP, Labour Party Member of Parliament for Bethnal Green and Bow constituency; first person of Bangladeshi origin to be elected to the House of Commons and one of the first three Muslim women to be elected as a member of parliament
- Farida Anwar, Labour Party politician, councillor for Headington Hill and Northway in Oxford City Council; in 2014, became Oxfordshire's first city councillor from a Bangladeshi background
- Apsana Begum MP, Labour Party Member of Parliament for Poplar and Limehouse, first Hijabi to be elected as an MP for the British parliament
- Anwar Choudhury, former governor of the Cayman Islands and High Commissioner of the UK to Bangladesh
- R. Palme Dutt, British political figure, who served as the fourth general secretary of the Communist Party of Great Britain during World War II
- Pushpita Gupta, a British Labour Party politician who is the former councillor for the Seven Kings ward in the London Borough of Redbridge serving from 2021 to 2026.
- Rupa Huq MP, Labour Party Member of Parliament for Ealing Central and Acton constituency, writer, columnist, senior lecturer in sociology at Kingston University and former Deputy Mayor of the London Borough of Ealing
- Rabina Khan, Liberal Democrat councillor for Shadwell ward, former Cabinet Member for Housing in Tower Hamlets London Borough Council, community worker and author of Ayesha's Rainbow
- Syeda Khatun MBE, Labour Party politician, councillor for Tipton Green in the Sandwell Metropolitan Borough Council and Cabinet Advisor for Education; in 1999, the first Bangladeshi woman to be elected in the Midlands
- Lisa Nandy Indian (Bengali)-British politician serving as Shadow Secretary of State for Levelling Up, Housing and Communities since 2021. A member of the Labour Party, she has been member of parliament (MP) for Wigan since 2010.
- Murad Qureshi, Labour Party politician and former Greater London Assembly member
- Lutfur Rahman, community activist and Independent politician; from 2010 to 2015 the first directly elected mayor of Tower Hamlets and the first Bangladeshi leader of the council
- Luthfur Rahman OBE, current deputy leader of Manchester City Council
- Nadia Shah, Labour Party politician, councillor in Regent's Park ward and former Mayor of Camden; in May 2016, became the first female mayor in the United Kingdom of Bangladeshi origin
- Tulip Siddiq MP, Labour Party Member of Parliament for Hampstead and Kilburn, former councillor for Regent's Park ward and Cabinet Member for Culture and Communities in Camden London Borough Council; in 2010, became the first Bengali female councillor in Camden Council
- Baroness "Pola" Manzila Uddin, Labour Party life peer, community activist, and the first Muslim and second Asian woman to sit in the House of Lords

=== United States of America ===
- Amit Bose, Administrator of the Federal Railroad Administration
- Saikat Chakrabarti, chief of staff to Ocasio-Cortez
- Indranil Chatterjee, Chairman of the Federal Energy Regulatory Commission
- Swadesh Chatterjee, chairman and co-founder of the U.S.-India Friendship Council
- Jay Chaudhuri, Member of the North Carolina Senate
- Raj Mukherji, Majority Whip and Democratic member of the New Jersey General Assembly from New Jersey's 33rd Legislative District covering portions of Hudson County (second Indian American elected to NJ state legislature); former Deputy Mayor of Jersey City, NJ; former Commissioner and Chairman of the Jersey City Housing Authority (then the youngest to serve in that position); Reservist (2001–09) in United States Marine Corps
- Hansen Clarke, Member of the U.S. House of Representatives from Michigan's 13th district, Democrat, Member of the Michigan Senate from the 1st district, Member of the Michigan House of Representatives from the 7th and 16th district

== Politicians ==
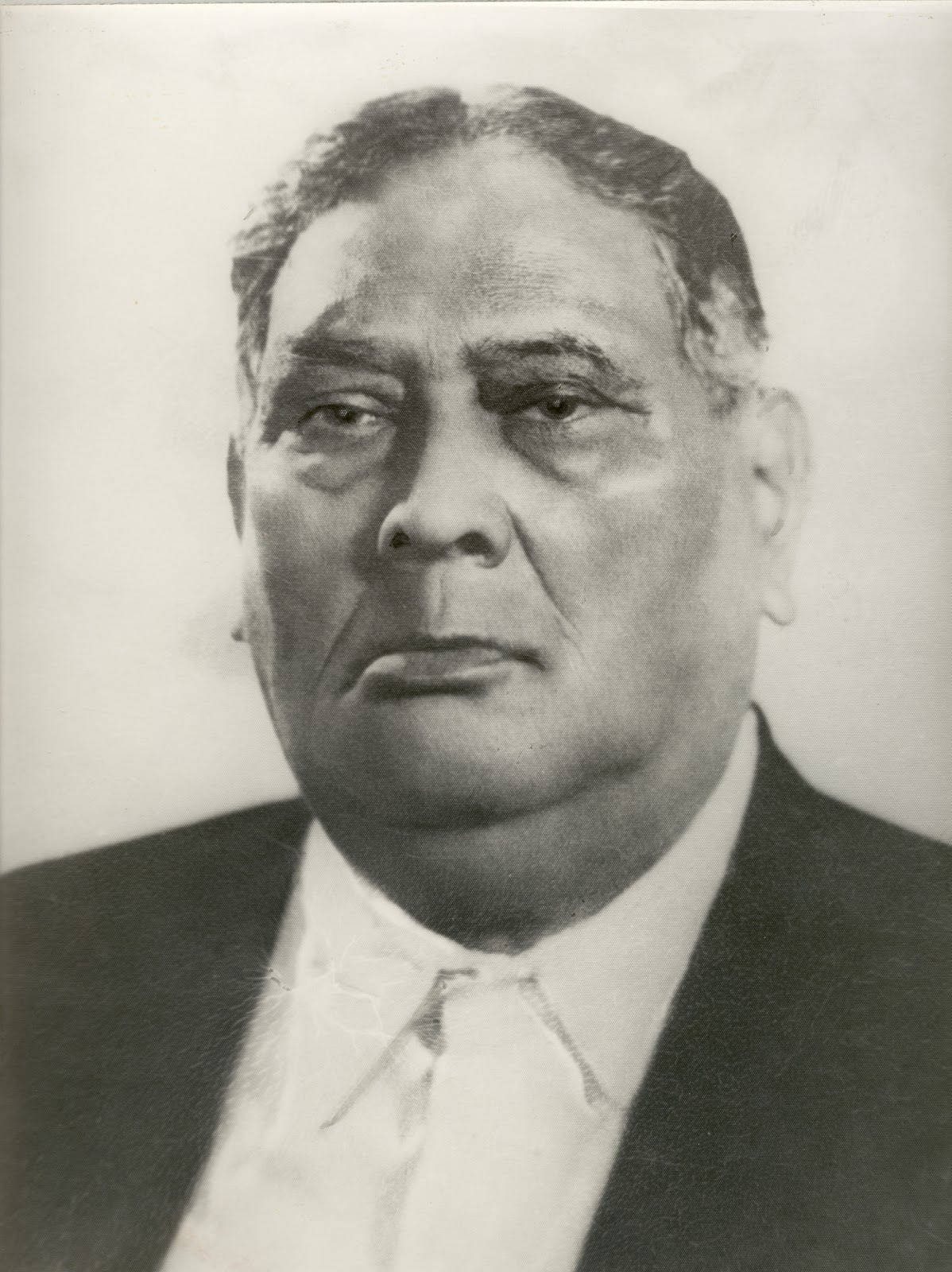
A. K. Fazlul Huq

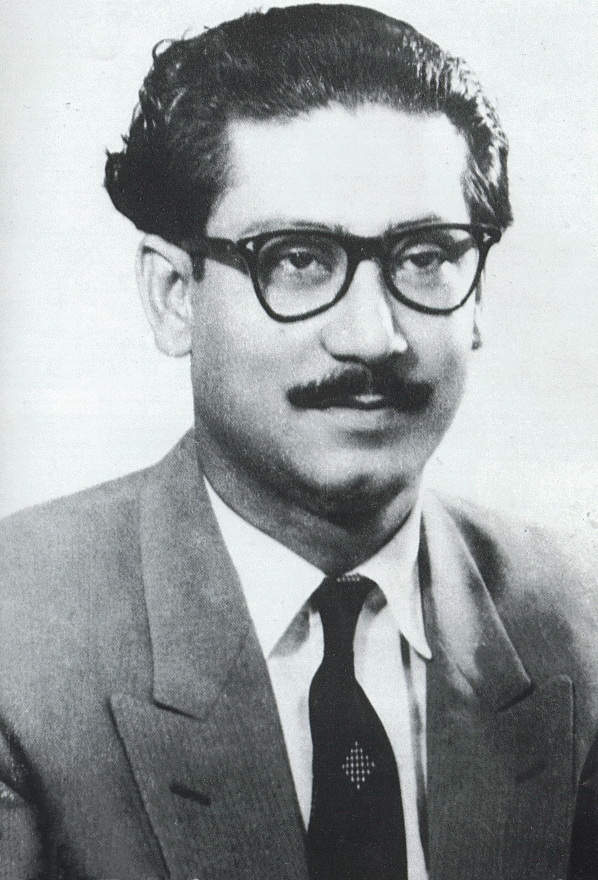
Sheikh Mujibur Rahman

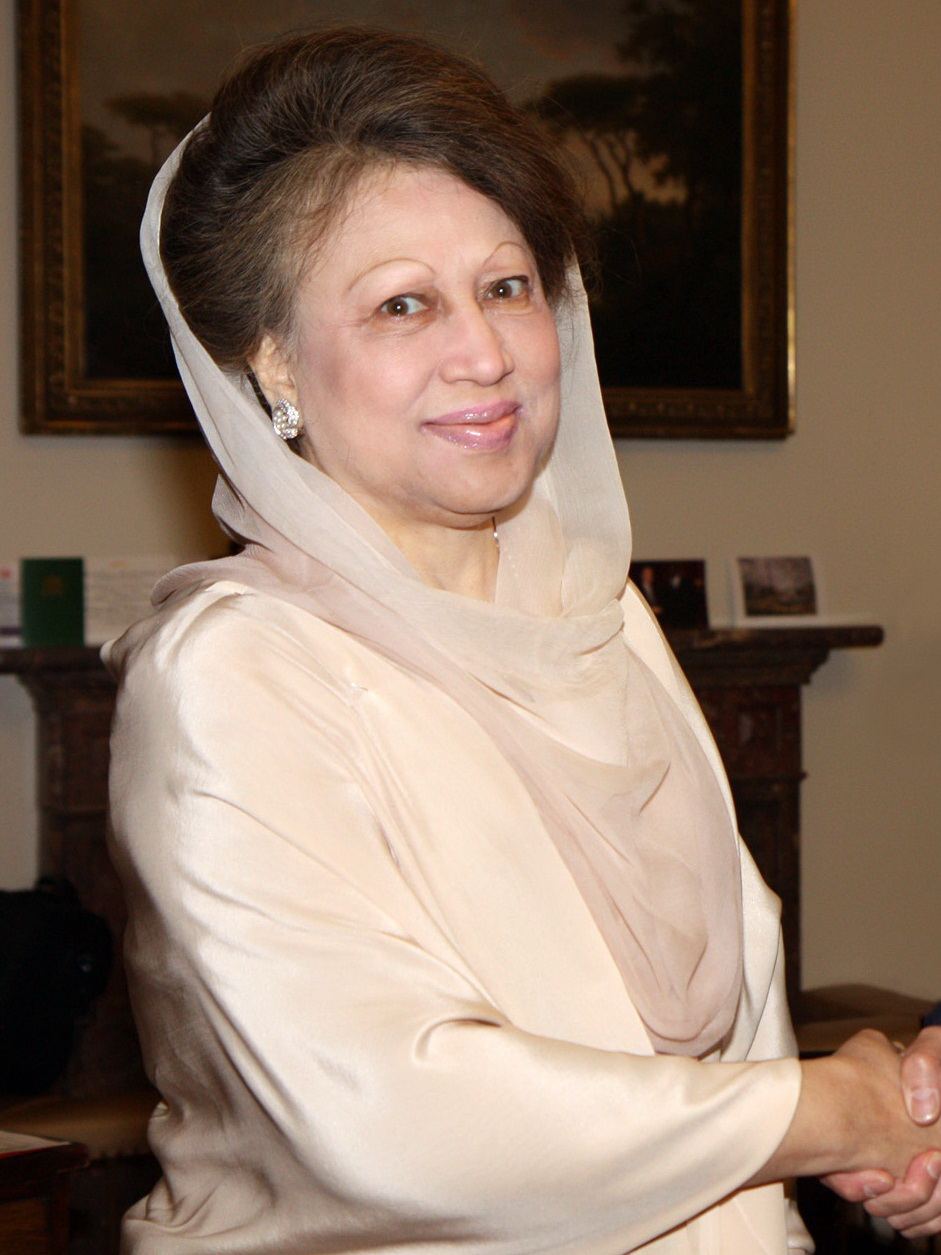
Khaleda Zia

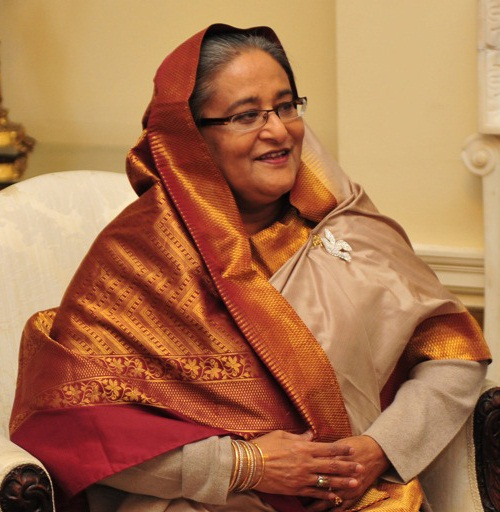
Sheikh Hasina Wazed

=== Bangladesh ===
- Tajuddin Ahmad, first prime minister of Bangladesh (1971–1972)
- Abdus Samad Azad, former Minister of Foreign Affairs
- Abdul Hamid Khan Bhashani, popularly known with the honorary title Mazlum Jananeta (Leader of the Oppressed)
- Abdul Gaffar Biswas (born 1949), former MP for Khulna-3
- Abdul Latif Biswas (born 1953), Bangladeshi minister
- Abdur Rahman Biswas (1926–2017), former president of Bangladesh
- Abdur Rasheed Biswas (died 1991), former MP of Jessore
- Abu Raihan Biswas (1940–2019), high school teacher and socialist
- AM Riasat Ali Biswas (1932–2016), Islamic scholar and politician
- Ehteshamul Haq Nasim Biswas (died 1998), medical doctor and politician
- Lutfar Rahman Biswas, Bangladeshi politician
- Manjur Rahman Biswas (1950–2023), former MP of Pabna-4
- Md. Golam Mostofa Biswas (born 1967), former MP of Nawabganj-2
- Mohammad Abdul Wadud Bishwas (born 1964), politician
- Mohammad Nurul Haque Biswas (1915–1998), army officer and politician
- Mohammad Sahiuddin Bishwas (1923–1990), freedom fighter and politician
- Nuruzzaman Biswas (born 1948), former MP of Pabna-4
- Panjab Ali Biswas, former MP of Pabna-4
- Shahidul Islam Biswas (1948–2006), former general secretary of Bangladesh Nationalist Party
- Wajed Ali Biswas (1947–2003), politician and shrimp exporter
- A. Q. M. Badruddoza Chowdhury, former President of Bangladesh (2001–2002) and the founder of Bikalpa Dhara Bangladesh
- Mukhlesur Rahman Chowdhury, de facto president and prime minister, former adviser to Iajuddin Ahmed
- Yusuf Ali Chowdhury (1905–1971), former Minister of Agriculture
- Hussain Muhammad Ershad, Chief Martial Law Administrator (CMLA), later President (1982–1990) and founder of the Jatiya party
- Ganesh Chandra Haldar, died 29 November 2022) was a Bangladesh Nationalist Party politician and a Member of Parliament. He was elected to the Jatiya Sangsad from the Madaripur-3 constituency during the February 1996 general elections.
- Sudhangshu Shekhar Haldar, died 29 September 2004) was a prominent Bangladesh Awami League politician and a former Member of Parliament. He was elected to the Jatiya Sangsad from the Pirojpur-1 constituency in 1991 and previously represented the Bakerganj-14 constituency in 1979.
- Kamal Hossain, lawyer, founder of Gano Forum and the leader of Jatiya Oikiya front alliance
- Farhad Hossain (born 1972), Minister of Public Administration
- A. K. Fazlul Huq, first prime minister of Bengal (Undivided), presented the Lahore Resolution with the official proposal of partition of India, Governor of East Pakistan
- Serajul Huq, one of the founding member of the Bangladesh Awami League
- AK Abdul Momen, incumbent Minister of Foreign Affairs
- Shamsul Huda Panchbagi (1897–1988), founder of the Emarat Party and member of the Bengal Legislative Assembly
- Ghulam Mahmood Quader, chairman of the Jatiya party
- Sheikh Mujibur Rahman, Bengali nationalist politician, president of Awami League, served as the first president of Bangladesh and second prime minister of Bangladesh, voted as the Greatest Bengali of all time in 2004 BBC's opinion poll
- Tarique Rahman (born 1967), acting chairman of the Bangladesh Nationalist Party
- Ziaur Rahman, founder of Bangladesh Nationalist Party, President of Bangladesh (1977–1981), proposed the creation of SAARC, sector commander and liberation war hero
- Zillur Rahman (1929–2013), former president of Bangladesh (2009–2013)
- Sheikh Hasina Wazed, Prime Minister of Bangladesh (1996–2001; 2009–present)
- Khaleda Zia, Prime Minister of Bangladesh (1991–1996; 2001–2006), "mother of democracy", leader of democracy movement in Bangladesh, first female PM of Bangladesh
- Abdur Rashid Tarkabagish (1900–1986), second president of the All Pakistan Awami Muslim League
- Chowdhury Kamal Ibne Yusuf (1940–2020), former Minister of Disaster Management
- Chowdhury Akmal Ibne Yusuf (1945–2021), member of the parliament
- Chowdhury Abd-Allah Zaheeruddin (1903–1967), former Minister of Health, Labor and Social welfare
- Nur Alam Ziku(1938–2010), co-founder of Jatiya Samajtantrik Dal

=== British India ===
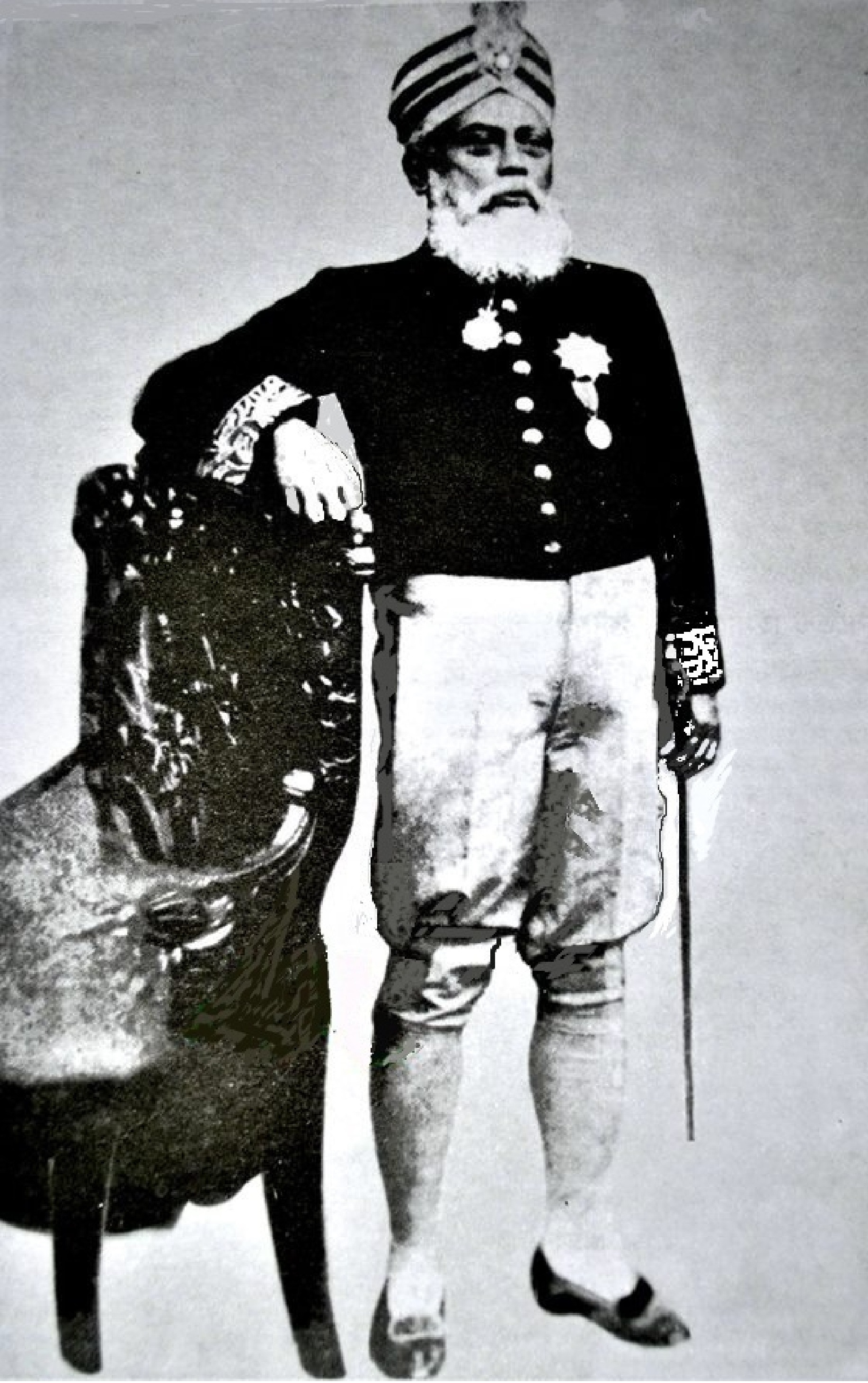
Nawab Syed Shamsul Huda was a patron, and donated immensely towards education for the Muslim students of Bengal during a difficult period.

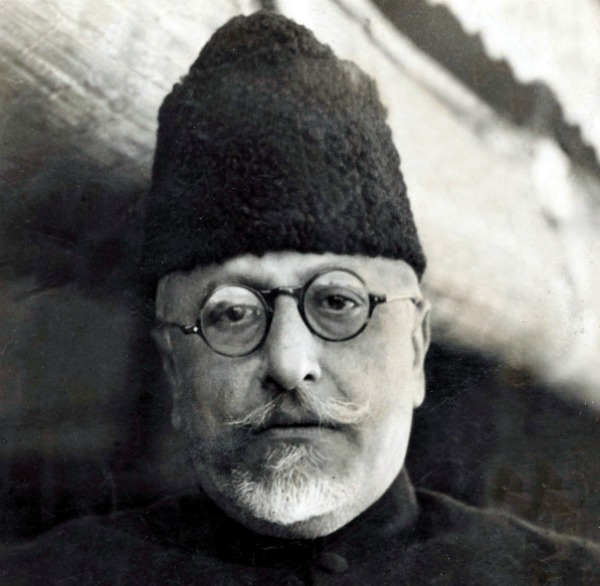
Abul Kalam Azad was India's first Minister of Education, and his birthday is now recognised as National Education Day across the country.

- Jalaluddin Ahmad, Bengali landlord, jurist and health minister
- Aftab Ali, founder of All-India Seamen's Federation and vice-president of All-India Trade Union Congress
- Aruna Asaf Ali, Indian independence activist
- Mahmud Ali, Freedom Movement leader, statesman
- Abul Kalam Azad, senior leader of the Indian National Congress during the Indian independence movement
- Chowdhury Moyezuddin Biwshash, merchant and aristocrat
- Rash Behari Bose, revolutionary leader against the British Raj in India and one of the key organisers of the Ghadar conspiracy and later, the Indian National Army
- Ajmal Ali Choudhury, prominent in the Sylhet referendum movement
- Moinul Hoque Choudhury, five-time MLA, two-time UN General Assembly representative and Minister of Industrial Development
- Chittaranjan Das, prominent in the Indian independence movement (also known as Deshabandhu)
- Abdul Halim Ghaznavi, politician, industrialist and minister
- Abdul Karim Ghaznavi, politician, traveler and minister
- Muhammad Hasanuzzaman, educationist and member of the Bengal Legislative Assembly for Tippera North
- Syed Shamsul Huda, Nawab of Gokarna, president of the All India Muslim League
- Hatem Ali Jamadar, member of the Bengal Legislative Assembly and East Bengal Legislative Assembly
- Nawab Ali Haider Khan, 9th Nawab of Longla, minister and leader of the Independent Muslim Party
- Sucheta Kriplani, freedom fighter and politician
- Nawab Abdul Latif, educator and social worker
- Syed Abdul Majid CIE, first native minister of Assam, pioneer of the agricultural industry
- Abdul Matlib Mazumdar, freedom fighter and political leader known for retaining the Barak Valley in India
- Abdul Kader Mia, member of the Bengal Legislative Assembly and East Bengal Legislative Assembly
- Sarojini Naidu, freedom fighter and poet
- Bipin Chandra Pal, Indian nationalist, one third of the Lal Bal Pal triumvirate
- Wajed Ali Khan Panni, Zamindar of Karatia, politician and educationist
- Khwaja Salimullah, founder of Muslim League, proposed establishing University of Dhaka

=== India ===
==== West Bengal ====
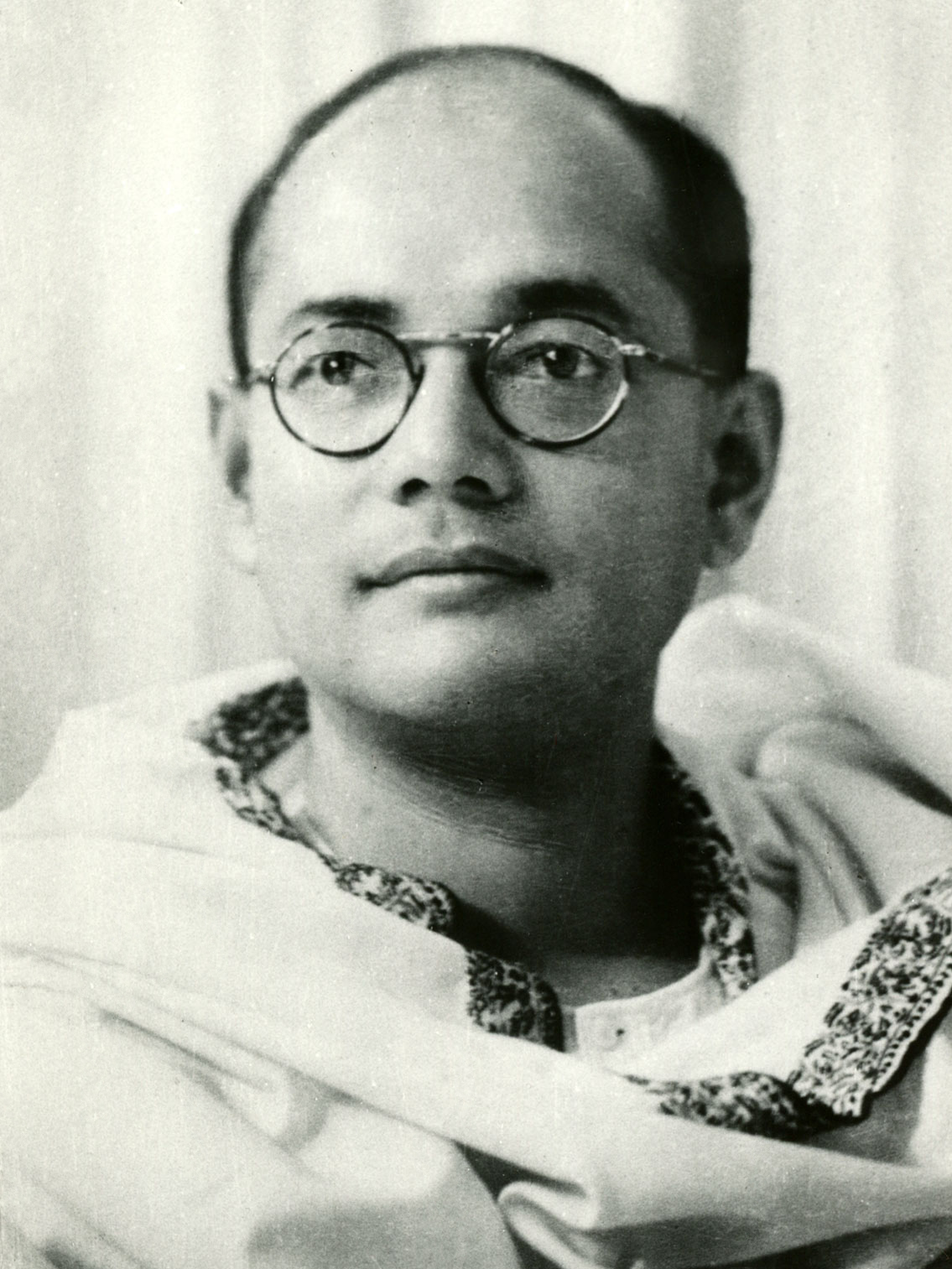
Subhas Chandra Bose is called the National Hero of India,Head of State of India's first free Provisional Government of Azad Hind and co-founder Indian National Army.

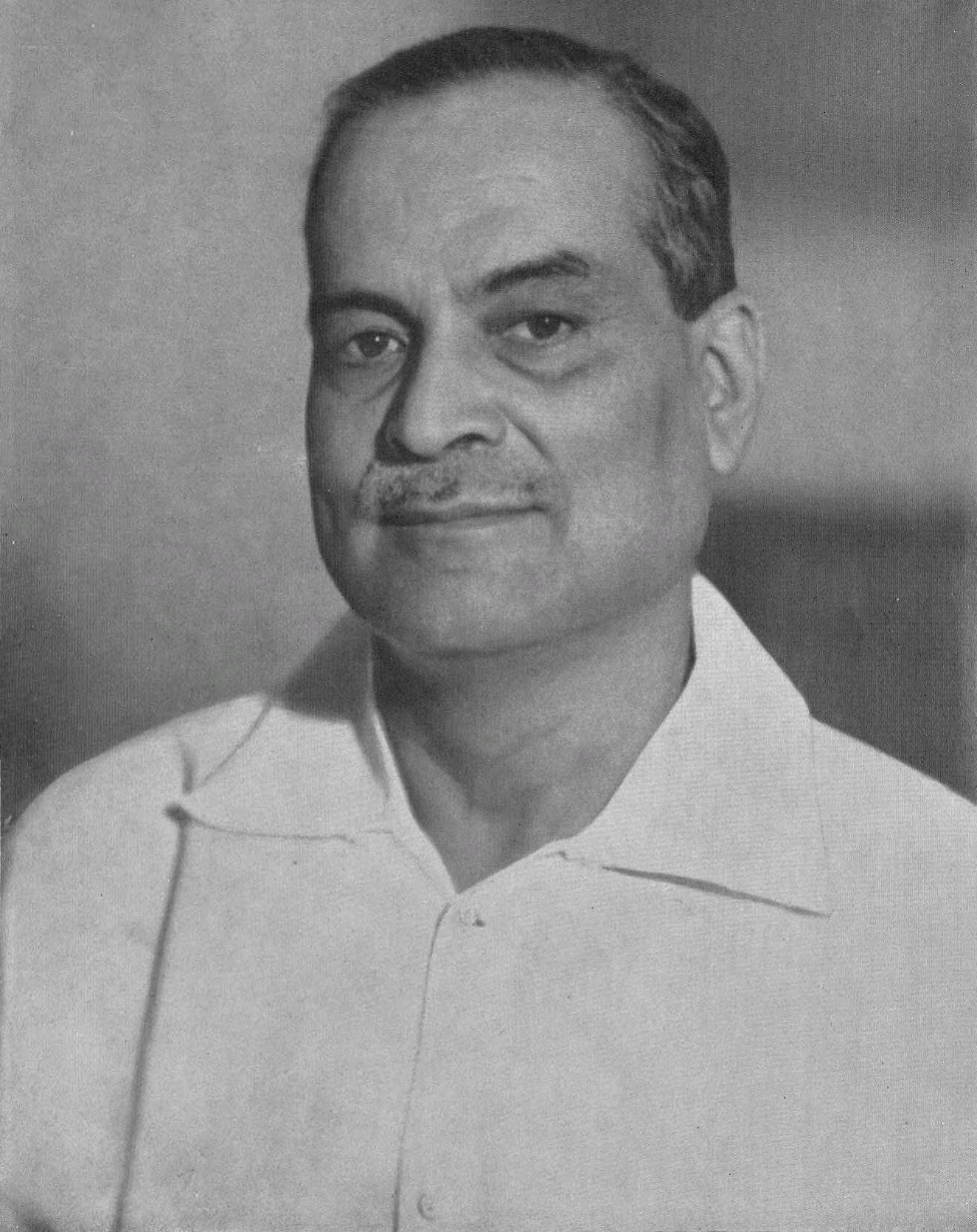
Bidhan Chandra Roy,2nd CM of West Bengal.

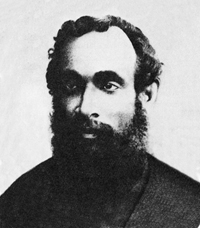
Surendranath Banerjee,one of the founding member of Indian National Congress in 1885

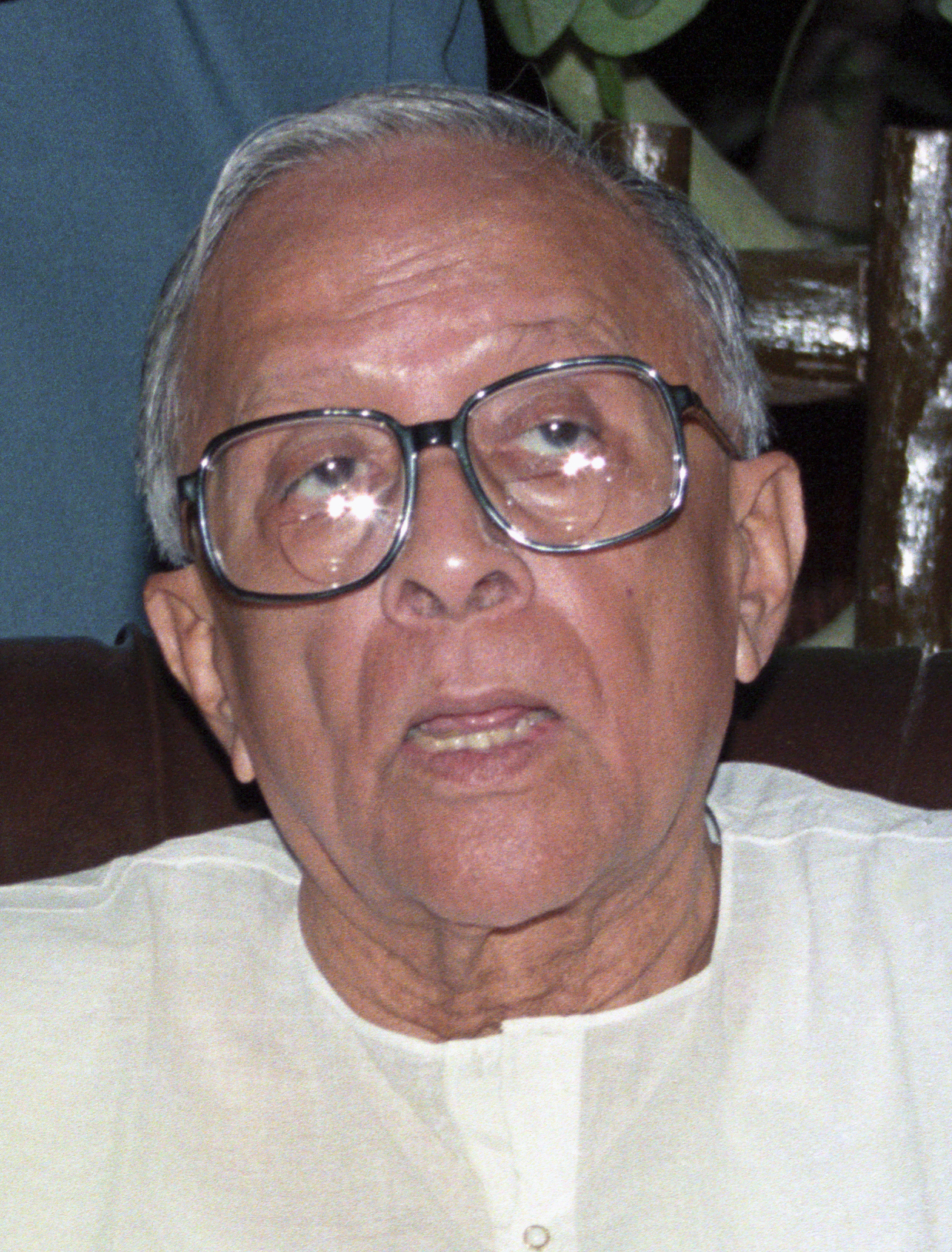
Jyoti Basu

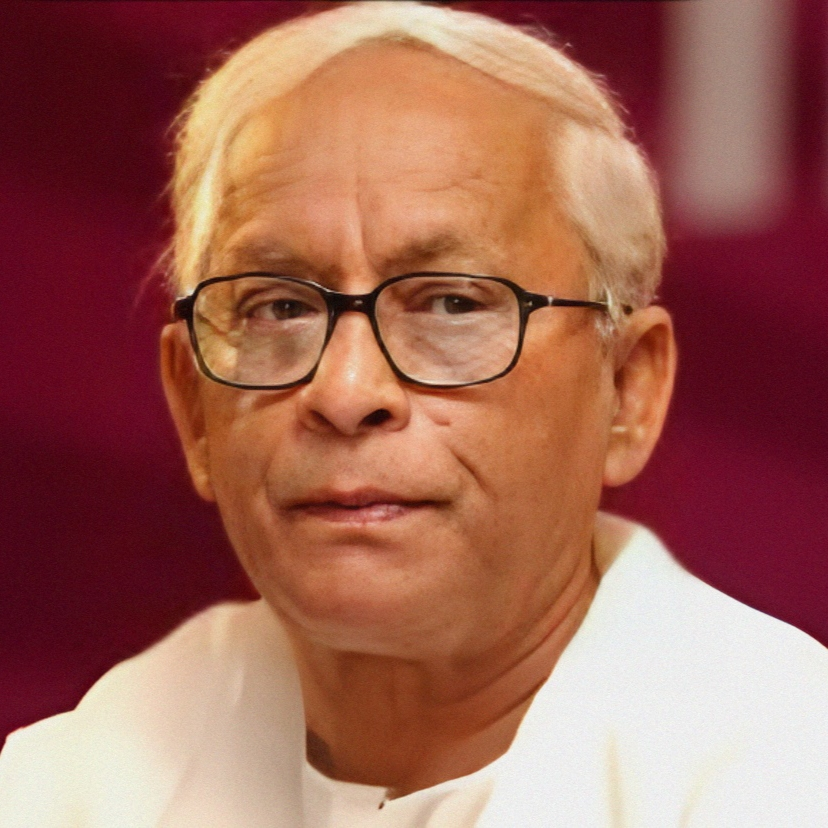
Buddhadeb Bhattacharjee

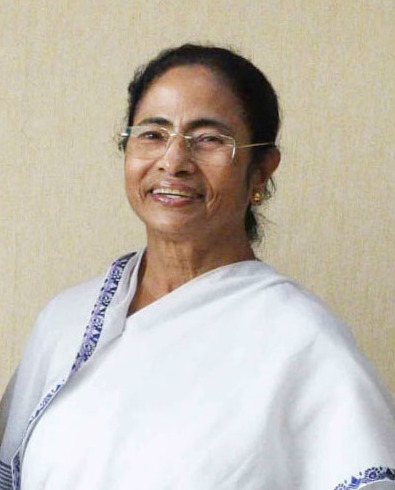
Mamata Banerjee

- Muzaffar Ahmad, one of the founders of the Communist Party of India
- Maziruddin Ahmed (born 1898), inaugural MLA of Cooch Behar
- Tamser Ali (born 1953), MLA for Natabari
- Syed Badrudduja, former mayor of Kolkata
- Abhishek Banerjee, member of Lok Sabha from Diamond Harbour, National General Secretary of All India Trinamool Congress
- Mamata Banerjee, Chief Minister of West Bengal (from 2011), ex-minister for Railways, Government of India, Chairman All India Trinamool Congress
- Mrinal Banerjee, former minister
- Surendranath Banerjee, one of the founding members of the Indian National Congress
- Jyoti Basu, former communist Chief Minister of West Bengal, former Politburo Member of the Communist Party of India(Marxist)
- Nargis Begum, MLA of Memari
- Buddhadeb Bhattacharya, former communist Chief Minister of West Bengal, Politburo Member of the Communist Party of India (Marxist) after 19th Party Congress
- Emani Biswas (born 1975), Trinamool politician
- Womesh Chandra Bonnerjee, first president of Indian National Congress
- Subhas Chandra Bose, former president of Indian National Congress, Head of State of India's first free Provisional Government of Azad Hind and co-founder Indian National Army
- Somnath Chatterjee, former Speaker of the Lok Sabha (Lower House of Parliament), expelled member of CPI(M), senior parliamentarian, prominent barrister
- A. B. A. Ghani Khan Choudhury, senior leader of Indian National Congress
- Saifuddin Choudhury (1952–2014), MLA of Memari
- Siddiqullah Chowdhury (born 1949), Cabinet Minister of West Bengal
- Syed Abul Mansur Habibullah (1917–1996), Law Minister of West Bengal
- Bapi Haldar: Represents the Mathurapur constituency as a current Member of Parliament belonging to the All India Trinamool Congress.
- Bhupendra Nath Haldar: Served as a Member of the Legislative Assembly in West Bengal under the Indian National Congress banner.
- Dipak Kumar Haldar: Formerly represented Diamond Harbour as an MLA, having been associated with both TMC and BJP during his career.
- Jogaranjan Haldar: Currently serves as the MLA for Kulpi, representing the All India Trinamool Congress.
- Joy Krishna Haldar: Former MLA from Kulpi, known for his long-standing political presence in South 24 Parganas.
- Joydeb Haldar: Elected as the MLA for Mandirbazar as a candidate of the All India Trinamool Congress.
- Kansari Haldar: A veteran CPI leader who represented the Mathurapur seat in the Lok Sabha.
- Krishna Chandra Haldar: Prominent CPI(M) leader who served as a Member of Parliament and held ministerial portfolios in the West Bengal Government.
- Madhurjya Haldar: Served as a Member of Parliament for the Mathurapur constituency representing the CPI(M).
- Manoranjan Haldar: Represented the Mathurapur constituency in Parliament as a member of the Indian National Congress.
- Pannalal Haldar: Elected as an MLA from the Diamond Harbour seat under the All India Trinamool Congress.
- Ram Sanker Haldar: Former MLA representing the Sonarpur constituency for the CPI(M).
- Sucharu Ranjan Haldar: Served as the Member of Parliament for Ranaghat after winning on an All India Trinamool Congress ticket.
- Abdul Halim (1901–1966), Communist politician and author
- Mohammad Fazle Haque (born 1933), state minister
- Sheikh Saidul Haque (born 1954), MP (Lok Sabha)
- Mohammad Hossain, MLA of Khandaghosh
- Ahmed Hassan Imran, MP of the Rajya Sabha
- Mollah Humayun Kabir, MLA of Purbasthali
- Fazlul Karim (born 1937), final MLA of Kranti
- Jahanara Khan (born 1967), MLA of Jamuria
- Sayed Md Masih (born 1944), MLA of Bhatar
- Fazal Karim Miah (born 1951), MLA for Tufanganj
- Subrata Mukherjee, former minister of West Bengal and former mayor of Kolkata
- Nurul Islam Mollah, MLA of Kalna
- Abu Ayesh Mondal (born 1944), MP and Chairman of West Bengal Minority Development & Finance Corporation
- Abul Hasem Mondal, MLA of Memari
- Idrish Mondal, MLA of Galsi
- Mehbub Mondal, MLA of Galsi
- Pranab Mukherjee, former president of India, Minister for External Affairs, senior leader of Indian National Congress
- Mohammed Abdullah Rasul (1903–1991), Transport Minister
- Siddhartha Shankar Ray, former Congress Chief Minister of West Bengal, former Indian ambassador to United States
- Bidhan Chandra Roy, physician, former Congress Chief Minister of West Bengal, Bharat Ratna
- Syeda Mamtaz Sanghamita (born 1946), MP (Lok Sabha)
- Janab Abdus Sattar (1911–1965), member of the Constituent Assembly of India
- Nurunnesa Sattar, MLA of Purbasthali
- Ashoke Kumar Sen, former Law Minister, barrister, and parliamentarian
- Sekh Sahonawez (born 1958), MLA of Ketugram
- Syed Shahedullah [Burdwan] (1913–1991), founding member of the Communist party in Bengal
- Chowdhury Abu Taleb (died 1971), politician
- Mahboob Zahedi (1929–2006), MP and government minister

==== Assam ====
- Abdur Rahim Ahmed, MLA of Barpeta
- Hafiz Bashir Ahmed, MLA of Bilasipara West
- Jahan Uddin Ahmed, member of Lok Sabha for Dhubri
- Jamal Uddin Ahmed, former MLA of Badarpur
- Kobad Hussain Ahmed, inaugural MLA of Mankachar
- Moinuddin Ahmed, former MLA of Jaleswar
- Sahab Uddin Ahmed, former MLA of Jaleswar
- Sherman Ali Ahmed, MLA of Baghbar
- Siddique Ahmed, MLA of Karimganj South
- Abdur Rahim Ajmal, politician in Jamunamukh
- Abdur Rahman Ajmal, politician in Salmara
- Badruddin Ajmal, founder of the All India United Democratic Front (AIUDF) and president of Jamiat Ulema-e-Hind's Assam branch
- Sirajuddin Ajmal, MLA of Jamunamukh and founder of Ajmal Foundation
- Abul Kalam Rasheed Alam, MLA of Goalpara East
- Sheikh Shah Alam, former MLA of Goalpara West
- Amjad Ali, two-time member of Lok Sabha for Dhubri
- Abul Kalam Azad, former MLA of Bhabanipur
- Abdul Aziz, MLA of Badarpur
- Hazi Salim Uddin Barbhuiya, MLA of Hailakandi
- Karim Uddin Barbhuiya, MLA of Sonai
- Gul Akhtara Begum, former MLA of Bilasipara East
- Abdul Munim Choudhury, former MLA of Karimganj South
- Khalilur Rahman Chowdhury, former MLA of Jamunamukh
- Nizam Uddin Choudhury, former MLA of Algapur
- Rashida Haque Choudhury, former Minister of State for Social Welfare
- Wazed Ali Choudhury, MLA of Salmara South
- Santosh Mohan Dev, former Union Cabinet Minister, elected to the Lok Sabha, senior leader of Indian National Congress
- Sushmita Dev, former member of Parliament, prominent leader of AITC
- Abdul Hamid, member of Lok Sabha for Dhubri
- Ali Hossain, former MLA of Sarukhetri
- Rasul Hoque, former MLA of Dhubri
- Najrul Hoque, MLA of Dhubri
- Samsul Huda, MLA of Bilasipara East
- Ahmed Hussain, member of Lok Sabha for Dhubri
- Anwar Hussain, member of Lok Sabha for Dhubri
- Ashraful Hussain, MLA of Chenga
- Ismail Hussain, former MLA of Barpeta
- Monowar Hussain, former MLA of Goalpara East
- Adv. Aminul Islam, general secretary and chief spokesperson for AIUDF
- Aminul Islam, former MLA of Dhing
- Aminul Islam, former MLA of Mankachar
- Hosenara Islam, first female MLA of Mankachar
- Nurul Islam, member of Lok Sabha for Dhubri
- Rafiqul Islam, MLA of Jania
- Zabed Islam, former MLA of Mankachar
- Zahirul Islam, second MLA of Mankachar
- Abdul Khaleque, former MLA of Jania
- Abdur Rahim Khan, former MLA of Barpeta
- Aziz Ahmed Khan, former MLA of Karimganj South
- Liakat Ali Khan, former MLA of Chenga
- Abdul Batin Khandakar, MLA of Abhayapuri North
- Aminul Haque Laskar, BJP politician of Sonai
- Anwar Hussain Laskar, former MLA of Hailakandi
- Misbahul Islam Laskar, MLA of Barkhola
- Suzam Uddin Laskar, AIUDF politician
- Zakir Hussain Laskar, MLA of Hailakandi
- Ataur Rahman Mazarbhuiya, AIUDF politician and leader of Nadwatut Tameer
- Abdur Rashid Mandal, MLA of Goalpara West
- Abdul Muhib Mazumder, one of the architects of the Illegal Migrants (Determination by Tribunals) Act, 1983
- Khalil Uddin Mazumder, MLA of Katigorah
- Aftabuddin Mollah, MLA of Jaleswar
- Motiur Rohman Mondal, former MLA of Mankachar
- Abu Saleh Najmuddin, former MLA of Badarpur
- A. F. Golam Osmani, Indian National Congress member
- Kabindra Purkayastha, former Minister
- Afzalur Rahman, inaugural MLA of Jaleswar
- Nijanur Rahman, MLA of Gauripur
- Abdur Rouf, former MLA of Jania
- Abdus Sobahan Ali Sarkar, MLA of Golakganj
- Zakir Hussain Sikdar, MLA of Sarukhetri
- Jahan Uddin, former MLA of Dhubri

==== Bihar ====
- Dulal Chandra Goswami, MP for Katihar
- Ajit Sarkar, four-time MLA of Purnia
- Madhavi Sarkar, MLA of Purnia

==== Meghalaya ====
- Akramozzaman, inaugural MLA of Phulbari
- Shamsul Hoque, inaugural MLA of Mahendraganj
- Mizanur Rahman Kazi, MLA of Rajabala
- Khorsedur Rahman Khan, former MLA of Rajabala
- S. G. Esmatur Mominin, current MLA of Phulbari
- Abu Taher Mondal, former three-time MLA of Phulbari
- Mozibur Rahman, inaugural MLA of Rajabala
- Abdus Saleh, MLA of Rajabala and former two-time MLA of Mahendraganj
- Manirul Islam Sarkar, former two-time MLA of Phulbari and Minister of Agriculture & Transport
- Azad Zaman, former MLA of Rajabala

==== Uttar Pradesh ====
- Sucheta Mazumdar Kripalani 4th Chief Minister of Uttar Pradesh also 1st Female Chief Minister of India. Lok Sabha M.P. from Gonda Lok Sabha constituency (1967-1971) & MLA from Menhdawal Assembly constituency of Uttar Pradesh Legislative Assembly (1962-1967)
- S. M. Banerjee, 4-time M.P. of Kanpur as an independent candidate with support of CPI from 1962 to 1977.
- Shyamdev Roy Chaudhari, 7-time M.L.A of South Varanasi from Bharatiya Janata Party

==== Uttarakhand ====
- Kiran Chand Mandal: Former Member of the Legislative Assembly (MLA) from the Sitarganj constituency.

==== Tripura ====
- Manik Sarkar, former chief minister of Tripura, Politburo member
- Biplab Kumar Deb, former chief minister of Tripura

==== Other ====
- Nawab Abdul Jabbar (1837–1918), Prime Minister of Bhopal State
- Abul Kasem (1872–1936), Secretary to the Prime Minister of Bhopal State
- Sucheta Kripalani Member of Parliament, Lok Sabha from New Delhi Lok Sabha constituency from 1951-1961
- Rabi Ray, speaker of Lok Sabha
- Ashab Uddin, member of the Manipur Legislative Assembly for Jiribam

=== Pakistan ===
- Nurul Amin, Prime Minister of Pakistan
- Jogendranath Mandal, Law Minister of Pakistan
- Abdullah al-Baqi (1886–1952), member of the 1st National Assembly of Pakistan
- Abdul Latif Biswas, member of the Pakistan National Assembly
- Mohammad Ali Bogra, Prime Minister of Pakistan 1953–1955
- Abdul Matin Chaudhary, served as the first Agriculture Minister of Pakistan
- Abdul Hamid, first Education Minister of East Bengal
- Abu Ahmad Abdul Hafiz, Muslim League politician and lawyer
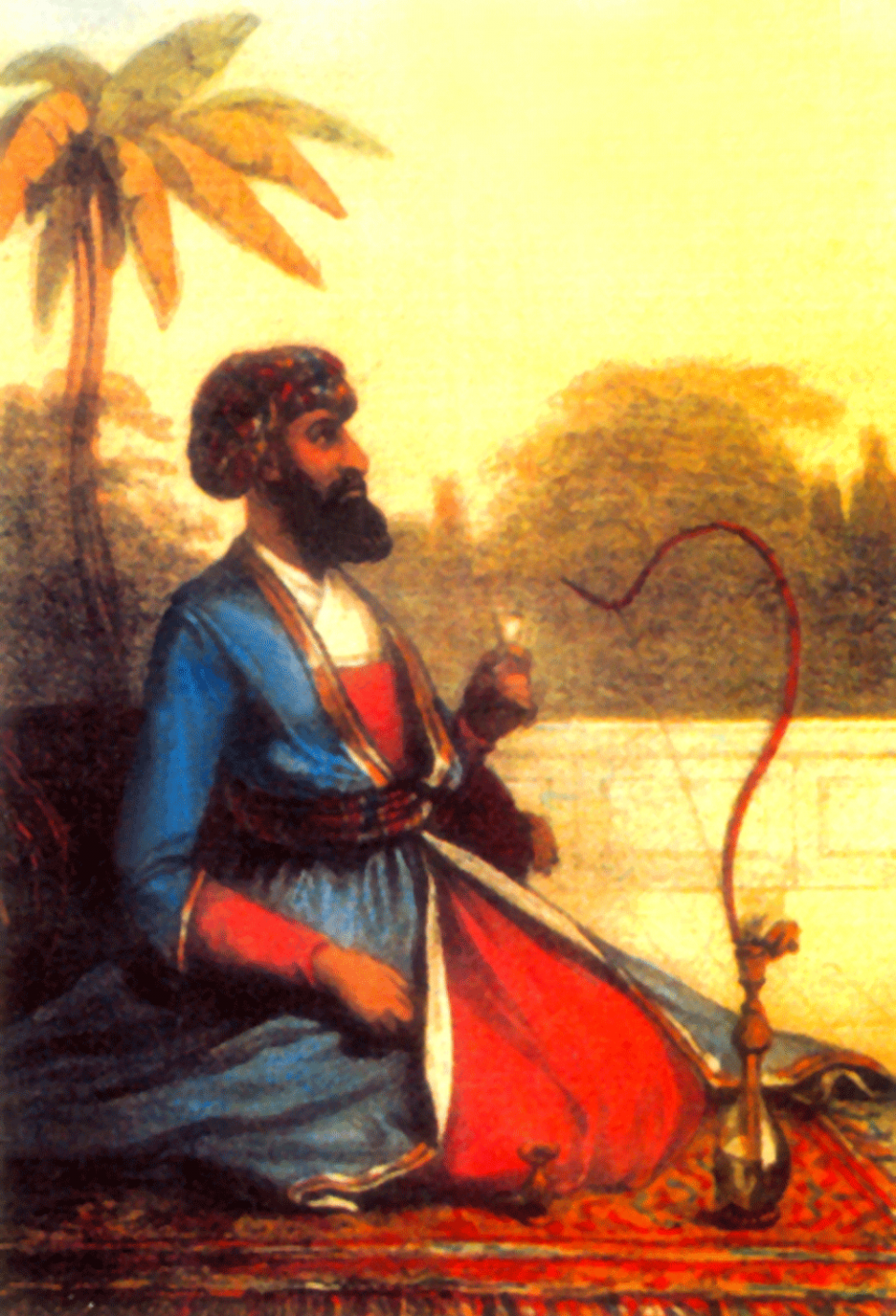
- I'tisam-ud-Din was the first educated Bengali and South Asian to have travelled to Europe.
  Abdul Wahab Khan, 3rd Speaker of the National Assembly of Pakistan
- Abdullah al Mahmood (d. 1975), member of the 1st National Assembly of Pakistan
- Jogendra Nath Mandal, served as the first Law & Labour Minister of Pakistan
- Iskander Mirza, first President of Pakistan
- Khawaja Nazimuddin, 2nd prime minister of Bengal (Undivided), 2nd prime minister of Pakistan, 2nd Governor-General of Pakistan, president of Muslim League
- Khurram Khan Panni, former chief whip of East Pakistan Provincial Assembly
- Md. Hafizur Rahman, Minister of Food and Agriculture of Pakistan (1958–1960); Minister of Commerce of Pakistan (1960–1962); Provincial Minister of Finance and Planning of East Pakistan (1962–1965)
- Huseyn Shaheed Suhrawardy, second Chief Minister of Bengal, Prime Minister of Pakistan (1956–1957)

=== Other ===
- I'tisam-ud-Din, Mughal diplomat and munshi

== Ramon Magsaysay Award ==
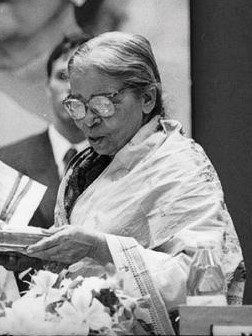
- Mahasweta Devi
  Kamaladevi Chattopadhyay, an Indian social reformer.
- Tahrunessa Abdullah
- Fazle Hasan Abed KCMG, founder of the world's largest non-governmental organisation, BRAC
- Amitabha Chowdhury
- Zafrullah Chowdhury
- Mahasweta Devi
- Gour Kishore Ghosh
- Angela Gomes
- Syeda Rizwana Hasan, attorney, Hero of the Environment and winner of the Goldman Environmental Prize
- Fazle Hasan Abed
  A.H.M. Noman Khan
- Sombhu Mitra
- Matiur Rahman
- Satyajit Ray
- Aruna Roy, an Indian social activist, professor, union organiser and retired IAS officer.She was the president of the National Federation of Indian Women and founder of the Mazdoor Kisan Shakti Sangathan.
- Abdullah Abu Sayeed
- Ravi Shankar
- Muhammad Yunus

== Religion and spirituality ==
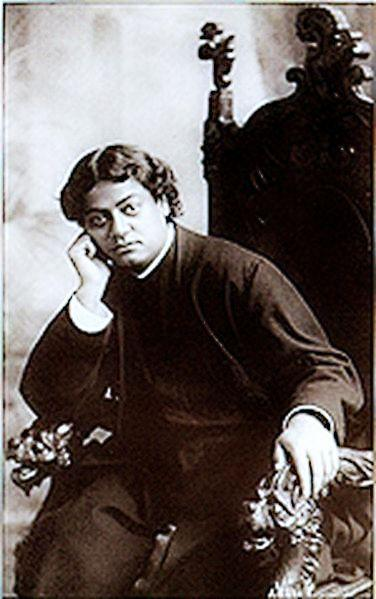
Swami Vivekananda in Bushnell Studio in San Francisco, 1900

=== Brahmoism ===
- Charulata Mukherjee, women's rights activist and social worker from Calcutta, associated with Brahmo Samaj and All India Women's Conference
- Ram Mohan Roy, founder of the Brahmo Samaj
- Keshub Chandra Sen
- Debendranath Tagore, social thinker and reformer, founder of the Brahmo Religion or Brahmoism

=== Buddhism ===
- Anagarika Munindra (1915–2003), vipassana meditation teacher, taught many notable meditation teachers including Dipa Ma, Joseph Goldstein, Sharon Salzberg, and Surya Das
- Bishuddhananda Mahathera, a Buddhist scholar and monk
- Jyotipal Mahathero, a Buddhist monk and the 10th Sangharaja of Bangladeshi Buddhists

=== Hinduism ===
- Swami Abhedananda (Kaliprasad Chandra), monk, author, philosopher, occultist, reformer, founder of the Ramakrishna Vedanta Math
- Advaita Acharya, Vaishnava guru
- Sri Aurobindo, yogi, nationalist, philosopher, author, poet, visionary
- Gaura Kisora dasa Babaji, Vaishnava ascetic, mystic and recluse
- Mahavatar Babaji, yogi and tantrik master
- Bamakhepa (Bamacharan Chattopadhyay), tantrik guru and mystic of Tarapith
- Kamalakanta Bhattacharya, Tantrik/Shakta saint and master, composer of Shakta devotional songs
- Sri Chinmoy, Indian spiritual master
- Swami Satyananda Giri (Manamohan Mazumder), monk, preacher and yogi
- Sri Yukteswar Giri (Priyanath Karar), yogi, educationist, astronomer, and astrologer
- Nolini Kanta Gupta, revolutionary, linguist, scholar, critic, poet, philosopher and mystic, the most senior of Sri Aurobindo's disciples, author of many books
- Gopinath Kaviraj, yogi, philosopher, spiritual master, tantrik scholar and author
- Anandamoyi Ma, mystic, spiritual teacher and Tantrik Guru
- Chaitanya Mahaprabhu, Vaishnava mystic, missionary, monk and social reformer
- Acharya Srimat Swami Pranavanandaji Maharaj, founder of Bharat Sevashram Sangha
- Lahiri Mahasaya or Shyama Charan Lahiri, yogi, philosopher, the propagator of Kriya Yoga
- Matsyendranatha, founder of Natha Sampradaya
- Arjuna Miśra, Sanskrit scholar and leading commentator on the Mahābhārata in the fifteenth century
- Nirmalananda, 19th century monk
- Nityananda, avadut mystic, social reformer, chief associate of Chaitanya, reincarnation of Balaram and a primary figure within the Gaudiya Vaishnava tradition of Bengal
- Ramakrishna Paramahamsa (Gadadhar Chattopadhaya), mystic, preacher of Dakshineshwar
- Nigamananda Paramahansa, Saraswat, tantrik guru, vedantic scholar, author, yogi, mystic, philosopher, disciple of Bamakhepa, founder of several institutions
- A.C. Bhaktivedanta Swami Prabhupada (Abhay Charan Dey), Vaishnava missionary and theologian, founder of ISKCON
- Pranavananda, founder of Bharat Sevashram Sangha
- Rani Rashmoni, founder of Dakshineswar Kali Temple, Kolkata
- Bhaktisiddhanta Sarasvati, Vaishnava missionary and theologian, founder of Gaudiya Math
- Prabhat Ranjan Sarkar or Sri Anandamurti, polymathic personality, author, philosopher, socio-political thinker, educationist, revolutionary, poet, composer, linguist, self-development and human-welfare theorist, the founder of Ananda Marga (a socio-spiritual movement)
- Ramprasad Sen, tantrik master, mystic, famous as a composer of devotional songs to Goddess Kali
- Bhaktivinoda Thakur, Vaishnava missionary and theologian
- Swami Vivekananda (Narendranath Datta), monk, missionary and social reformer, founder of the Ramakrishna Math and Ramakrishna Mission
- Paramahansa Yogananda, monk, philosopher, preacher, author, exponent of Kriya Yoga

=== Islam ===
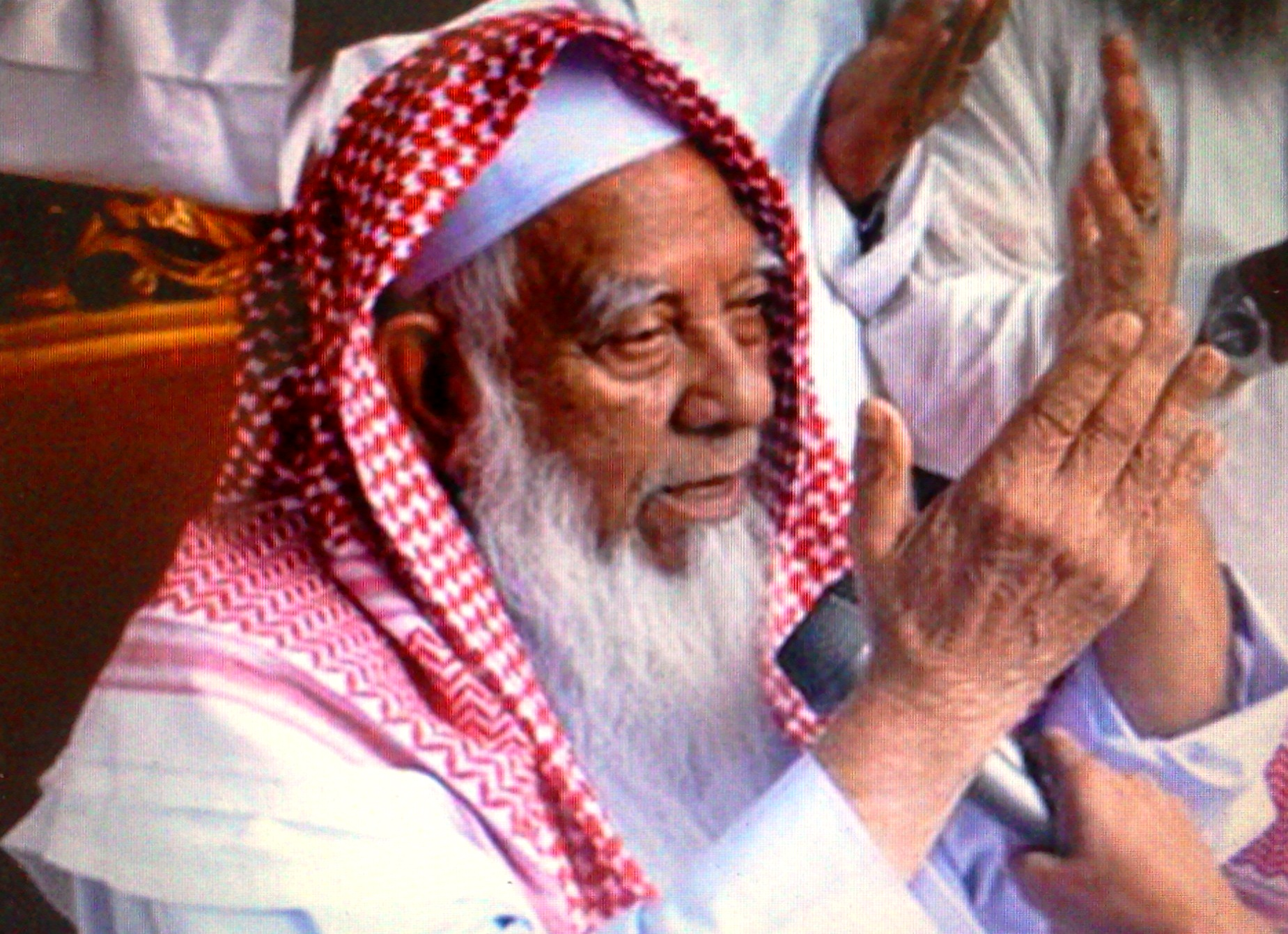
Shah Ahmad Shafi in 2019

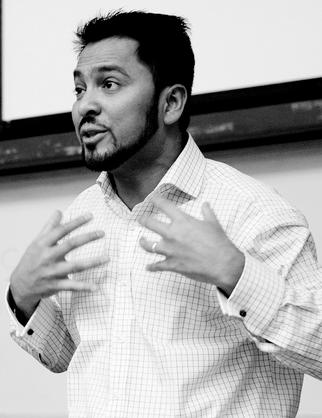
Ajmal Masroor was nominated for the Religious Advocate of the Year award at the 2013 & 2015 British Muslim Awards.

- Mearajuddin Ahmad (c. 1890), author of Tufat al-Muslimin
- Muhsinuddin Ahmad (1819–1862), second leader of the Faraizi movement
- Nesaruddin Ahmad (1873–1952), inaugural Pir of Sarsina and founder of Darussunnat Kamil Madrasa
- Nur Qutb Alam (d. 1416), Islamic scholar involved in the Bengal-Jaunpur confrontation and pioneer of the Dobhashi tradition
- Abu Saeed Muhammad Omar Ali (1945–2010), author, teacher and translator
- Muhammad Ayyub Ali (1919–1995), former principal of Madrasah-e-Alia Dhaka and Sylhet Alia Madrasa
- Ruhul Amin (born 1962), khatib of Baitul Mukarram National Mosque
- Fazlul Haque Amini (1945–2012), former principal of Jamia Qurania Arabia Lalbagh and politician
- Harun Babunagari (1902–1986), founding principal of Al-Jamiatul Islamiah Azizul Uloom Babunagar
- Junaid Babunagari (1955–2021), former Amir of Hefazat-e-Islam
- Muhibbullah Babunagari (born 1935), current Amir of Hefazat-e-Islam
- Ahmed Ali Badarpuri (1915–2000), president of the Assam State Jamiat Ulama-e-Hind for over four decades
- Muhammad Abdul Bari (1930–2003), former vice-chancellor of the University of Rajshahi
- Muhammad Abdullahil Baqi (1886–1952), Islamic scholar, writer and politician
- Mushahid Ahmad Bayampuri (1907–1971), scholar and member of 3rd National Assembly of Pakistan
- Abdul Wahid Bengali (1850–1905), co-founder of Al-Jamiatul Ahlia Darul Ulum Moinul Islam
- Athar Ali Bengali (1891–1976), former president of Nizam-e-Islam Party
- Shah Nuri Bengali (died 1785), Sufi scholar and author
- Abdul Hamid Khan Bhashani (1880–1976), founder of the Awami Muslim League and The Daily Ittefaq
- Qazi Mu'tasim Billah (1933–2013), former principal Jamia Shariyyah Malibagh and former professor at the University of Dhaka
- Belayet Hossain Birbhumi (1887—1984), Islamic scholar, author and academic
- Ashraf Ali Bishwanathi (1928–2005), former president of Jamiat Ulema-e-Islam Bangladesh
- Abdul Halim Bukhari (born 1945), Islamic scholar and chancellor of Al Jamia Al Islamia Patiya
- Abdur Rahman (scholar) (1920–2015), founder of Islamic Research Center Bangladesh
- Abdus Salam Chatgami (1943–2021), former Grand Mufti in both Pakistan and Bangladesh
- Ibrahim Chatuli (1894–1984), Education Minister of Assam and former member of parliament in Pakistan and Bangladesh
- Abdul Jalil Choudhury (1925–1989), Islamic scholar and former MLA of Badarpur and Algapur
- Abdul Matin Chowdhury (1915–1990), Shaykh of Fulbari and political activist
- Farid Uddin Chowdhury (born 1947), principal of Shahjalal Jamia School
- Najib Ali Choudhury (c. 1870), founder of the Madinatul Uloom Bagbari in South Assam
- Izharul Islam Chowdhury, founder of Jamiatul Uloom Al-Islamia Lalkhan Bazar
- Shahinur Pasha Chowdhury, vice-president of Jamiat Ulema-e-Islam
- Ahmed Ali Enayetpuri (1898–1959), founder of Sariat-i-Islam newspaper
- Khwaja Yunus Ali Enayetpuri (1886–1951), founder of the Enayetpuri Sufi Darbar
- Muhammad Faizullah (1892–1976), former teacher at Al-Jamiatul Ahlia Darul Ulum Moinul Islam
- Abdul Haque Faridi (1903–1996), founder of the Islami Bishwakosh project
- Shamsul Haque Faridpuri (1896–1969), founder of the Jamia Qurania Arabia Lalbagh
- Nurul Islam Farooqi (died 2014), TV presenter assassinated by Islamic militants
- Abdul Latif Chowdhury Fultali (1913–2008), founder of the Fultali movement and Darul Hadis Latifiah
- Muhammad Asadullah Al-Ghalib (born 1948), reformist and founder of Ahle Hadith Andolon Bangladesh
- Nur Uddin Gohorpuri (1924–2005), chairman of Befaqul Madarisil Arabia Bangladesh
- Tafazzul Haque Habiganji (1938–2020), former vice-president of Hefazat-e-Islam and Jamiat Ulema-e-Islam
- Abdul Malek Halim, founder of Al-Jamiatul Arabia Haildhar Madrasa
- Obaidullah Hamzah (born 1972), current principal of Al Jamia Al Islamia Patiya
- Alaul Haq (1301–1398), Islamic scholar entrusted with the Bengal Sultanate treasury
- Ubaidul Haq (1928–2007), former khatib of Baitul Mukarram
- Azizul Haq (1903–1961), founder of Al Jamia Al Islamia Patiya
- Azizul Haque (1919–2012), first translator of Sahih Al-Bukhari into the Bengali language
- Mahfuzul Haque (born 1969), Islamic scholar and politician
- Mamunul Haque (born 1973), Islamic scholar and influential speaker
- Mahmudul Hasan (born 1950), president of Al-Haiatul Ulya Lil-Jamiatil Qawmia Bangladesh and Befaqul Madarisil Arabia Bangladesh
- Shah Ahmad Hasan (1882–1967), founder of Jiri Madrasa
- A F M Khalid Hossain (born 1959), vice-president of Hefazat-e-Islam Bangladesh
- Sayed Moazzem Hossain (1901–1991), former vice-chancellor of the University of Dhaka
- Zohurul Hoque (1926–2017), translator of the Qur'an
- Hafezzi Huzur (1895–1997), founder of the Bangladesh Khilafat Andolan
- Abdul Momin Imambari (1930–2020), former president of Jamiat Ulema-e-Islam Bangladesh
- Syed Muhammad Ishaq (1915–1977), founder of the Chormonai Darbar Sharif and Jamia Rashidia Ahsanabad
- Shahidul Islam (born 1960), founder of al-Markaz al-Islami
- Maniruzzaman Islamabadi (1875–1950), journalist and founder of the Anjuman-i-Ulama-i-Bangala
- Abdul Jabbar Jahanabadi (1937–2016), former secretary-general of Befaqul Madarisil Arabia Bangladesh
- Khandaker Abdullah Jahangir (1961–2016), professor at Islamic University, Bangladesh
- Abul Hasan Jashori (1918–1993), freedom fighter and founding principal of Jamia Ejazia Darul Uloom Jessore
- Nurul Islam Jihadi (born 1948), secretary-general of Hefazat-e-Islam
- Syed Faizul Karim (born 1973), senior vice-president of Islami Andolan
- Syed Fazlul Karim (1935–2006), former Pir of Chormonai and founder of Islami Andolan
- Syed Rezaul Karim (born 1971), current Pir of Chormonai and leader of Islami Andolan
- Nur Hossain Kasemi (1945–2020), former secretary-general of Hefazat-e-Islam
- Deen Muhammad Khan (1900–1974), co-founder of Jamia Qurania Arabia Lalbagh
- Mohammad Akram Khan (1868–1969), founder of The Azad
- Muhiuddin Khan (1935–2016), translator of the Qur'an and the Ma'ariful Qur'an exegesis
- Abdul Hamid Madarshahi (1869–1920), co-founder of Darul Uloom Hathazari
- Ghulamur Rahman Maizbhandari (1865–1937), 2nd Pir of Maizbhandari
- Syed Ahmadullah Maizbhandari (1826–1906), founder of the Maizbhandari Darbar
- Maqsudullah (1883–1961), Deobandi scholar and Pir of Talgachhia Darbar Sharif
- Ajmal Masroor (born 1971), British politician, imam and TV presenter
- Abu Taher Misbah (born 1956), academic, author and founder of Madani Nesab
- Abdur Rahim Muhammadpuri (1859–1931), Islamic writer
- Mohammad Meherullah (1861–1907), comparative religionist writer
- Abdul Khaleque Mondal (born 1944), Jamaat-e-Islami politician and principal of Agardari Madrasa
- Shah Sultan Ahmad Nanupuri (1914–1997), founding principal of Al-Jamiah Al-Islamiah Obaidia Nanupur
- Saifur Rahman Nizami (born 1916), Ekushey Padak recipient
- Shamsul Huda Panchbagi (1897–1988), founder of the Emarat Party and two-time member of the Bengal Legislative Assembly
- Abdul Wahhab Pirji (1890–1976), scholar, educationist and founding principal of Jamia Hussainia Ashraful Uloom, Bara Katara
- Shamsuddin Qasemi (1935–1996), former secretary-general of Jamiat Ulema-e-Islam
- Abdul Qayum (born 1960), Chief Imam of the East London Mosque
- Habibullah Qurayshi (1865–1934), co-founder of Al-Jamiatul Ahlia Darul Ulum Moinul Islam
- Abdur Rahim (1918–1987), first leader of the Bangladesh Jamaat-e-Islami
- Sajidur Rahman (born 1964), vice-president of Befaqul Madarisil Arabia Bangladesh
- Shah Waliur Rahman (1916–2006), Islamic scholar and female education activist
- Abu Zafar Mohammad Saleh (1915–1990), Independence Award recipient
- Muhammad Shahidullah (1885–1969), essayist and editor of the Islami Bishwakosh
- Haji Shariatullah (1781–1840), founder of the Faraizi movement
- Mohammad Abu Bakr Siddique (1865–1943), inaugural Pir of Furfura Sharif
- Uthman Sirajuddin (1258–1357), Court Scholar of Bengal under the Ilyas Shahis
- Delwar Hossain Sayeedi (born 1940), Islamic scholar and former member of Bangladeshi parliament
- Shah Ahmad Shafi (1916–2020), former Amir of Hefazat-e-Islam
- Ibrahim Ali Tashna (1872–1931), Islamic scholar, poet and activist
- Zia Uddin (born 1941), president of Jamiat Ulema-e-Islam Bangladesh
- Ibrahim Ujani (1863–1943), Qur'an reciter and founder of Jamia Islamia Ibrahimia
- Shah Abdul Wahhab (1894–1982), second principal of Darul Uloom Hathazari
- Muhammad Wakkas (1952–2021), former secretary-general of Jamiat Ulema-e-Islam
- Nurul Islam Walipuri (born 1955), mufassir, teacher and author
- Obaidul Haque Wazirpuri (1934–2008), former co-president of Befaqul Madarisil Arabia Bangladesh
- Abul Kalam Muhammad Yusuf (1926–2014), former chairman of Darul-Arabia wa Darul-Ifta Bangladesh
- Sayed Kamaluddin Zafree (born 1945), founder of the Bangladesh Islami University
- Abubakar Muhammad Zakaria (born 1969), professor at Islamic University, Bangladesh
- Shaikh Zamiruddin (1870–1937), writer and revert to Islam

=== Christianity ===
- Kali Charan Banerjee, lawyer and theologian, founder of the Calcutta Christo Samaj, member of the Indian National Congress
- Krishna Mohan Banerjee, Bengali philosopher and litterateur, President of the Bengal Christian Association
- Puroshottam Choudhary, preacher, evangelist, writer of Christian literature
- Lal Behari Dey, Indian journalist, writer, and Christian missionary
- Patrick D'Rozario, first Bangladeshi Cardinal, Archbishop of Dhaka
- Aurobindo Nath Mukherjee, first Indian Bishop of Calcutta and Metropolitan of India
- Krishna Pal, Bengali evangelist and missionary, first Bengali convert to Christianity under William Carey

=== Wicca ===
- Ipsita Roy Chakraverti

== Freedom Fighters and Revolutionaries ==
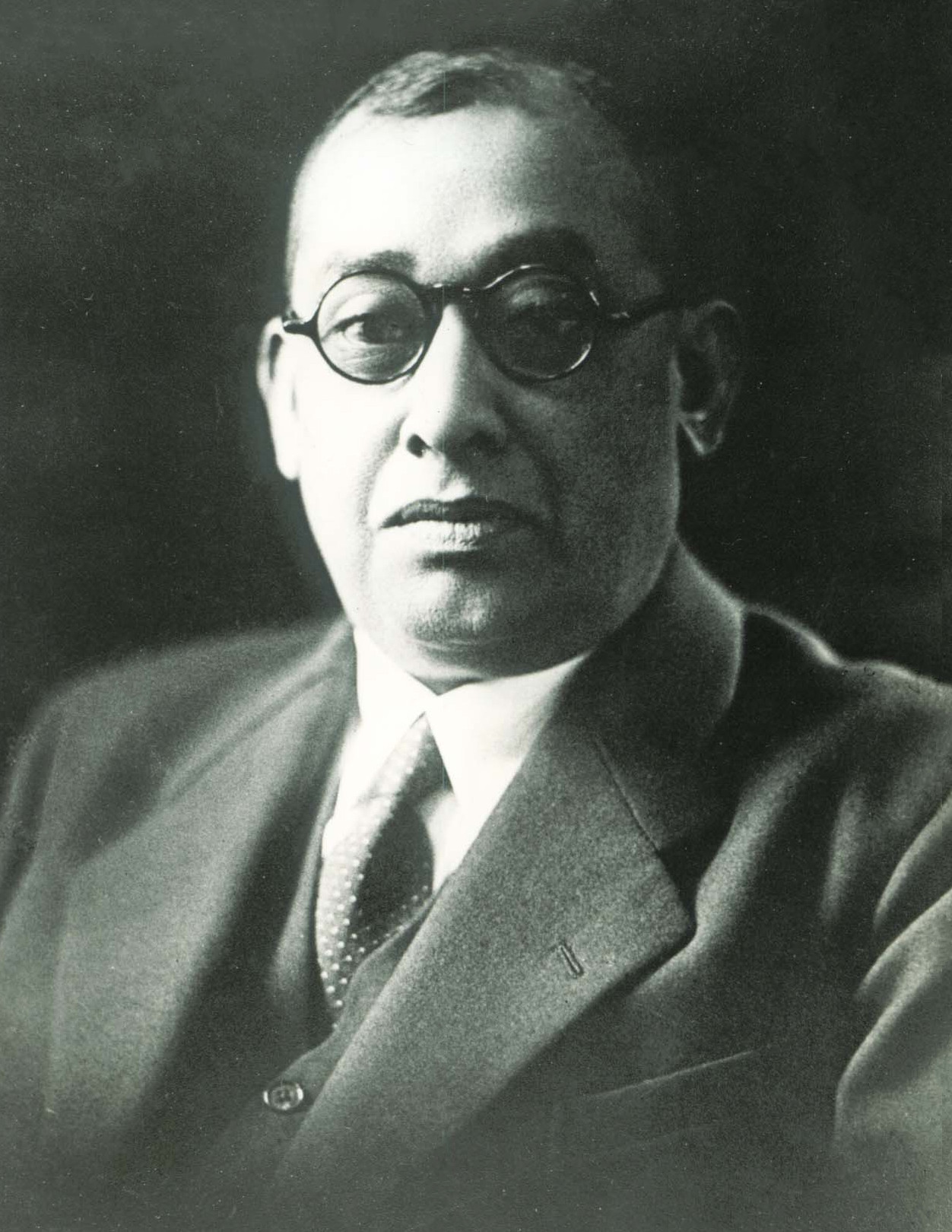
- Rash Behari Bose
  Alimuddin Ahmad
- Rafiq Uddin Ahmed
- Aruna Asaf Ali
- Sri Aurobindo
- Harigopal Bal(Tegra)
- Lokenath Bal
- Surendranath Banerjee
- Abul Barkat
- Benoy Basu
- Pradyot Kumar Bhattacharya
- Basanta Kumar Biswas
- Chittaranjan Das called Deshbandhu
  Womesh Chandra Bonnerjee
- Charu Chandra Bose
- Khudiram Bose
- Netaji Subhas Chandra Bose
- Rash Behari Bose
- Sarat Chandra Bose
- Prafulla Chaki
- Ambika Chakrobarty
- Panchanan Chakraborty
- Amarendranath Chatterjee
- Jogesh Chandra Chattopadhyay
- Virendranath Chattopadhyaya
- Bagha Jatin
  Chittapriya Ray Chaudhuri
- Suniti Choudhury
- Bina Das
- Chittaranjan Das
- Jatindra Nath Das
- Tarakeswar Dastidar
- Bhupendra Kumar Datta
- Kalpana Datta
- Basanti Devi
- Sushil Kumar Dhara
- Batukeshwar Dutt
- Kanailal Dutta
- Ullaskar Dutta
- Bipin Behari Ganguli
- Dwarkanath Ganguly
- Barindra Kumar Ghosh
- Ganesh Ghosh
- Santi Ghose
- Jiban Ghoshal
- Dinesh Gupta
- Badal Gupta
- Birendranath Dutta Gupta
- Basanti Devi Haldar
- Matangini Hazra
- Kazi Nazrul Islam
- Abdul Jabbar (activist)
- Bagha Jatin
- Hemchandra Kanungo
- Rajab Ali Khan
- Dinesh Chandra Majumdar
- Jatindranath Mukherjee
- Saroj Mukherjee
- Sarojini Naidu
- Bipin Chandra Pal
- Anath Bondhu Panja
- Sudhamoy Pramanick
- Shafiur Rahman
- Renuka Ray
- B. C. Roy
- M. N. Roy
- Abdus Salam
- Satish Chandra Samanta
- Birendranath Sasmal
- Narendra Mohan Sen
- Surya Sen
- Triguna Sen
- Manoranjan Sengupta
- Nellie Sengupta
- Titumir
- Pritilata Waddedar

== Science and technology ==
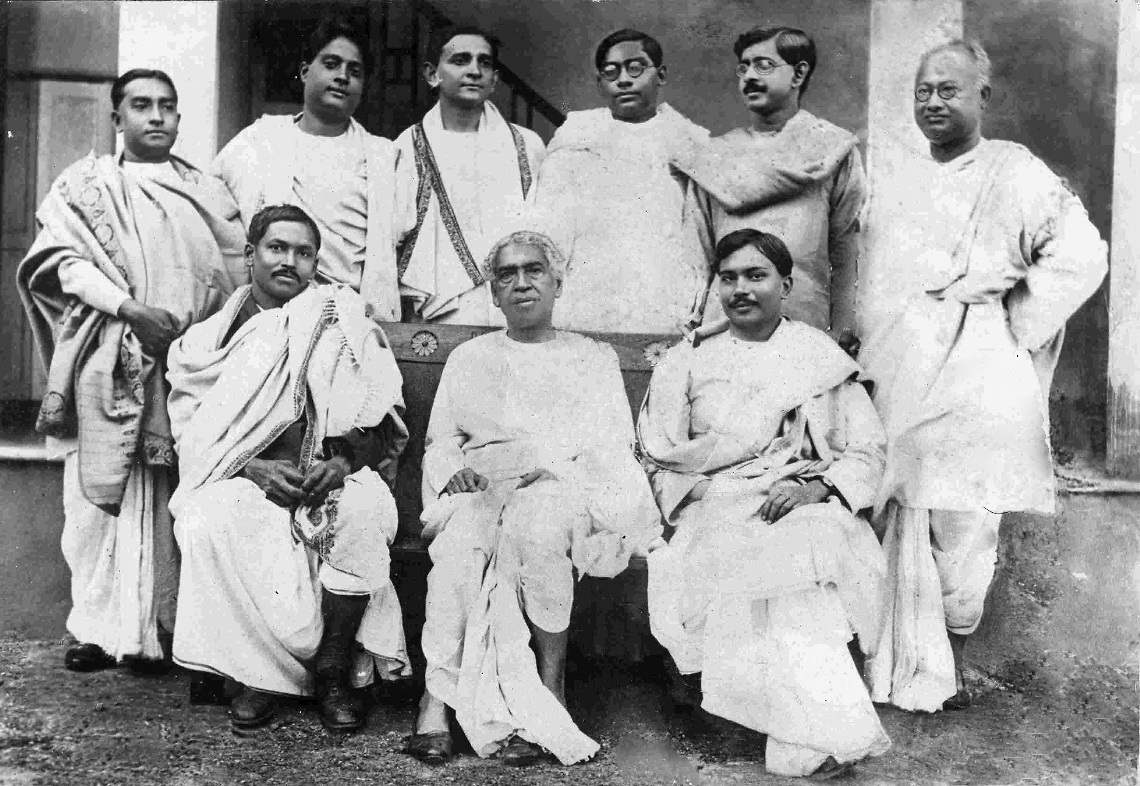
Seated (L to R): Meghnad Saha, Jagadish Chandra Bose, Jnan Chandra Ghosh. Standing (L to R): Snehamoy Dutt, Satyendranath Bose, Debendra Mohan Bose, N R Sen, Jnanendra Nath Mukherjee, N C Nag.

=== Physicists ===
- Ahsan Ali, doctor, physician and researcher
- Kedareswar Banerjee, first crystallographer of India, known for X-ray Crystallography and was director of the Indian Association for the Cultivation of Science, Kolkata. The K. Banerjee Centre of Atmospheric and Ocean Studies was established in his honour
- Srikumar Banerjee, director of BARC and AECI
- Mani Lal Bhaumik, physicist, helped develop the first excimer laser at the University of California
- Debendra Mohan Bose, physicist, made contributions in the field of cosmic rays, artificial radioactivity and neutron physics
- Jagadish Chandra Bose, physicist, radio and wireless transmission pioneer, also did substantial work on botany
- Satyendra Nath Bose, physicist, founded Bose–Einstein statistics, which helped to produce Bose–Einstein condensate (2001 Nobel Prize in Physics was given for this discovery); the Boson, an elementary particle named after him
- Swapan Chattopadhyay, particle accelerator physicist, contributed to the development of many accelerators around the world, e.g. the Super Proton-Antiproton Synchrotron, the Large Hadron Collider at CERN, and the Advanced Light Source at Berkeley
- Amitabha Ghosh, only Asian on NASA's Mars Pathfinder mission
- Dipan Ghosh, theoretical physicist, known for Majumdar–Ghosh model
- Hiranmay Sen Gupta, physicist, has published around 200 research papers in various international journals
- M. Zahid Hasan, physicist, Eugene Higgins endowed chair professor of quantum physics at Princeton University and scientist at Lawrence Berkeley National Laboratory, known for discoveries in quantum matter and topology
- Mohammad Ataul Karim, known for contributions to the fields of electro-optical devices and systems, optical computing and processing, and pattern recognition
- Ashesh Prasad Mitra, performed major work in the field of the Earth's near-space environment, through group based and space techniques
- Sisir Kumar Mitra, physicist, pioneer in the investigations of ionosphere, the Mitra crater on the Moon is named after him
- Bedabrata Pain, co-inventor of CMOS image sensor, also an award-winning filmmaker
- Amal Kumar Raychaudhuri, physicist, known for his contributions to relativity and cosmology including Raychaudhuri's equation
- Somak Raychaudhury, astrophysicist and observational cosmologist, Director, Inter-University Centre for Astronomy and Astrophysics
- Subrata Roy, known for his contributions in the modelling of plasma physics and the invention of the Wingless Electromagnetic Air Vehicle and serpentine geometry plasma actuator
- Meghnad Saha, physicist, produced the Thermo-Ionization Equation or Saha Equation
- Ashoke Sen, physicist, known for his contributions to string theory, co-discovered S-duality
- Bikash Sinha, former director of SINP and Padmabhusan awardee

=== Biologists ===
- Maqsudul Alam, scientist and professor, achieved four milestones in genomics - sequencing the genomes of papaya, rubber plants, jute and fungus
- Gopal Chandra Bhattacharya, known for his pioneering work on social insects and the role of bacteria in metamorphosis
- Sharmila Bhattacharya, head of the Biomodel Performance and Behavior laboratory at NASA Ames Research Center
- Ananda Mohan Chakrabarty, most notable for his work in directed evolution and his role in developing a genetically engineered organism using plasmid transfer while working at GE
- Maharani Chakravorty, organized the first laboratory course on recombinant DNA techniques in Asia and Far East in 1981
- Biraja Sankar Guha, first director of Anthropological Survey of India
- Jahangir Alam Khan, agricultural economist and researcher
- Dilip Mahalanabis, biologist, under his leadership the International Centre for Diarrhoeal Disease Research (Bangladesh medical centre), discovered oral rehydration therapy, which has saved more than 40 million lives from diarrhea
- Swadhin Kumar Mandal, Alexander von Humboldt Fellow and Shanti Swaroop Bhatnagar Award winner
- Panchanan Mitra, first professor of anthropology in India, among the first Indians to study at Yale University
- Mohammad Hossain Mondol, director-general of Bangladesh Agricultural Research Institute
- Sarat Chandra Roy, widely regarded as the father of Indian ethnography, the first Indian ethnographer, and as the first Indian anthropologist
- Ram Brahma Sanyal, pioneer in captive breeding; one of the first zookeepers trained as a biologist; a corresponding member of the Zoological Society of London
- Dwijen Sharma, naturalist and science writer
- Sourindra Mohan Sircar, One of the greatest Indian botanist, was also the General President of Indian Science Congress Association

=== Geologists ===
- Pramatha Nath Bose, one of the early Indians to join Geological Survey of India
- Nibir Mandal, known for studies on the evolution of geological structures, Shanti Swaroop Bhatnagar Award winner
- Sharat Kumar Roy, Indian geologist and adventurer, first Indian to set foot in North Pole
- Sudipta Sengupta, Indian geologist and one of the first Indian Women to set foot on Antarctica
- M. A. Zaher, director-general of the Geological Survey of Bangladesh

=== Chemists ===
Abdus Suttar Khan invented more than forty different alloys for commercial application in space shuttles, jet engines, train engines and industrial gas turbines.

- Sadhan Basu, Palit professor at Calcutta University and Bhatnagar Award, CV Raman recipient
- Asima Chatterjee, known for her work in the fields of organic chemistry and phytomedicine; her most notable work includes those on vinca alkaloids, and the development of anti-epileptic and anti-malarial drugs
- Jnan Chandra Ghosh, chemist, known for anomaly of strong electrolytes
- Abul Hussam, chemist, inventor of Sono arsenic filter and the gold winner of the 2007 Grainger Challenge Prize for Sustainability
- Abdus Suttar Khan, chemist, inventor of alloys for use in commercial jets, U.S. fighter planes, gas turbines, train engines, and space shuttles
- Nurul Haque Miah, chemist, former professor at Dhaka College, textbook author
- Jnanendra Nath Mukherjee, chemist, specialised in the fields of electrochemistry, colloids and soil science
- Prafulla Chandra Roy, pioneer in the field of pharmaceutical and chemical works (discovered mercurous nitrite), The Royal Society of Chemistry honoured him with the first ever Chemical Landmark Plaque outside Europe, founder of Bengal Chemicals & Pharmaceuticals, India's first pharmaceutical company

=== Doctors and physicians ===
- Shamsuddin Ahmed, medical doctor martyred in the Bangladesh Liberation War
- Rafiuddin Ahmed, dentist, founder of the first dental college of India and Bengal Dental Association, which later became Indian Dental Association
- Syed Modasser Ali, ophthalmic surgeon and a health advisor to Sheikh Hasina, founder of Mojibunnessa Eye Hospital and editor-in-chief of the Bangladesh Ophthalmic Journal.
- Upendranath Brahmachari, synthesized Urea Stibamine (carbostibamide) and used it in the treatment of Kala-azar (leishmaniasis), was a nominee for the Nobel Prize in Physiology or Medicine
- Surjo Kumar Chakraborty, India's first graduate in medicine
- Kadambini Ganguly, one of the first two Indian women who trained in Western medicine
- Jogesh Chandra Ghosh, pioneer of modern Ayurvedic medicine
- Siddhartha Mukherjee, physician, scientist and writer, author of The Emperor of All Maladies: A Biography of Cancer, which won the Pulitzer Prize for General Nonfiction in 2011
- Subhash Mukhopadhyay, physician, first physician in India and second in the world to perform in vitro fertilization
- Shuvo Roy, scientist and inventor of implantable artificial kidney
- Syeda Mamtaz Sanghamita (born 1946), gynaecologist
- Mahendralal Sarkar, homeopath and founder of the Indian Association for the Cultivation of Science
- Hassan Suhrawardy, second Muslim from the sub-continent to become a Fellow of the Royal College of Surgeons of England

=== Mathematicians ===
- Debabrata Basu, founded Basu's theorem
- Anil Kumar Bhattacharya, known for Bhattacharya coefficient, and the Bhattacharya distance
- Raj Chandra Bose, known for Association scheme, Bose–Mesner algebra and Euler's conjecture
- Sourav Chatterjee, specialised in mathematical statistics and probability, professor at Stanford University
- Anil Kumar Gain, mathematician and statistician, professor at University of Cambridge as well as a Fellow of the Royal Society
- Jayanta Kumar Ghosh, known for Bahadur-Ghosh-Kiefer representation and Ghosh-Pratt identity
- Anadi Sankar Gupta, specialised in fluid dynamics and magnetohydrodynamics notably on heat transfer in free convection flow in the presence of magnetic field
- Qazi Azizul Haque, pioneered the mathematical formula for Henry Classification System of fingerprinting
- Khandkar Manwar Hossain, Bangladeshi statistician, founder of The Department of Statistics of Rajshahi University
- Prasanta Chandra Mahalanobis, best remembered for the Mahalanobis distance (a statistical measure), founder of Indian Statistical Institute (ISI)
- Samarendra Kumar Mitra, designed, developed and constructed India's first indigenous computer (an electronic analog computer) in ISI
- Syamadas Mukhopadhyaya, introduced the four-vertex theorem and Mukhopadhyaya's theorem in eucliden geometry
- ANM Muniruzzaman, Bangladeshi statistician died in Bangladesh Liberation War
- Ritabrata Munshi, specialised in number theory, graduate student of Andrew Wiles
- Dijen K. Ray-Chaudhuri, known for BCH code, professor emeritus at Ohio State University
- Samarendra Nath Roy, known for multivariate analysis
- Sucharit Sarkar, Indian topologist and IMO gold medallist
- Radhanath Sikdar, calculated the height of Mount Everest

=== Technologists ===
- Shubham Banerjee, inventor of Braigo; at 12 years old (2014) became the youngest entrepreneur to receive venture capital funding
- Shuman Ghosemajumder, co-founder of TeachAids, former click fraud czar at Google
- Jawed Karim, software engineer, co-founder of YouTube, early employee of PayPal
- Samarendra Kumar Mitra, designed, developed, and constructed India's first indigenous computer in 1953 (an electronic analog computer)

=== Architects, archaeologists and engineers ===
- Jalal Ahmad (born 1959), president of the Institute of Architects Bangladesh, vice-president of the Commonwealth Association of Architects
- Sultanuddin Ahmed, engineer martyred during the Bangladesh Liberation War
- Vidyadhar Bhattacharya (1693–1751), the chief architect and city planner of Jaipur, Rajasthan; with Sir Samuel Swinton Jacob, he is credited as the architect of City Palace, Jaipur
- Fazlur Rahman Khan (1929–1982), structural engineer and architect, father of tubular designs for high-rises such as Willis Tower (aka Sears Tower) and the John Hancock Center
- Saiman Miah (born 1986), architectural and graphic designer, designed one of the two £5 commemorative coins for the 2012 Summer Olympics.
- M Harunur Rashid, archaeologist, educationist and museum curator
- Abul Kalam Mohammed Zakaria, archaeologist

== Social reformers and position holders ==
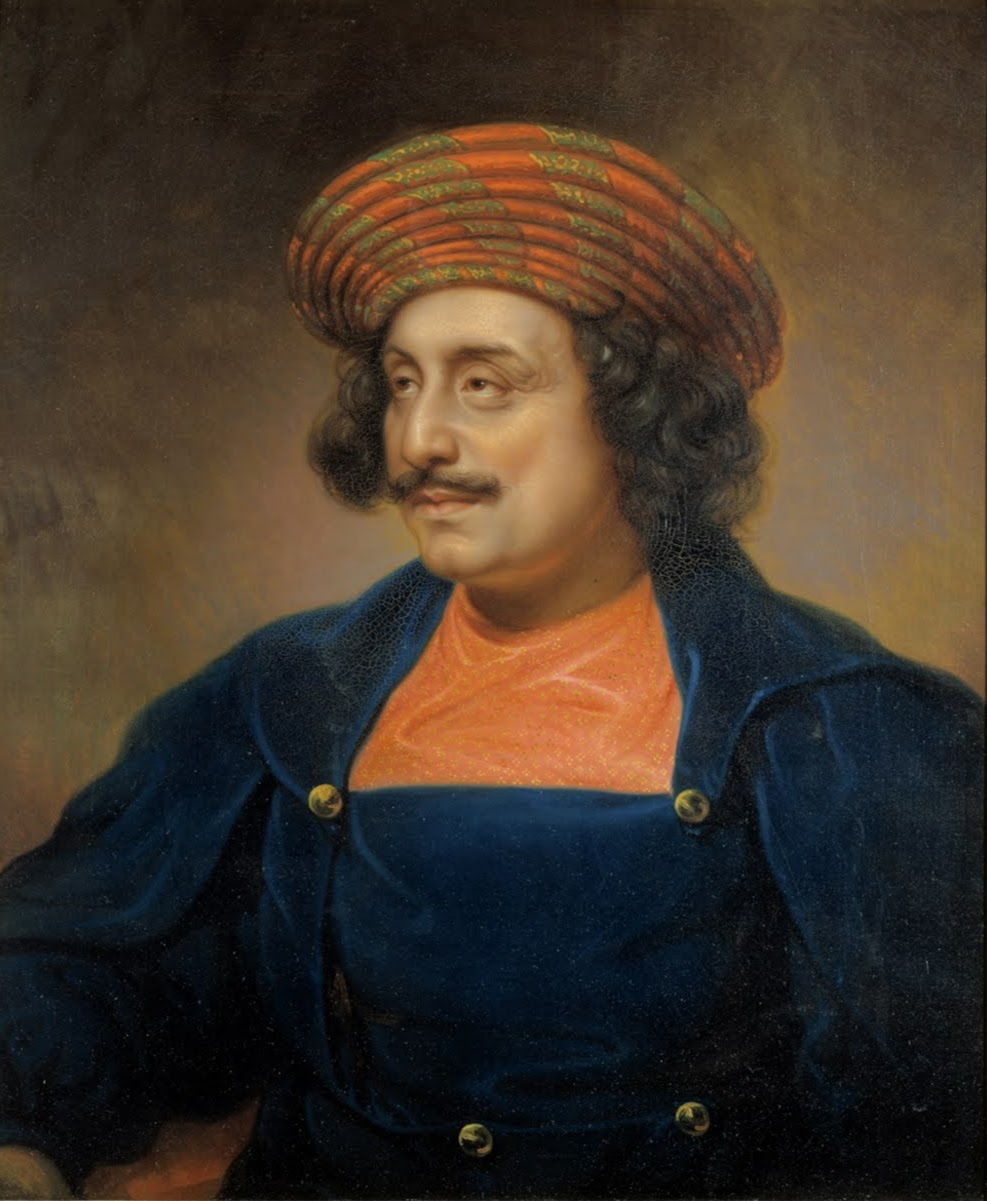
Raja Ram Mohun Roy,called the first modern man of India,abolished inhuman Sati system in India

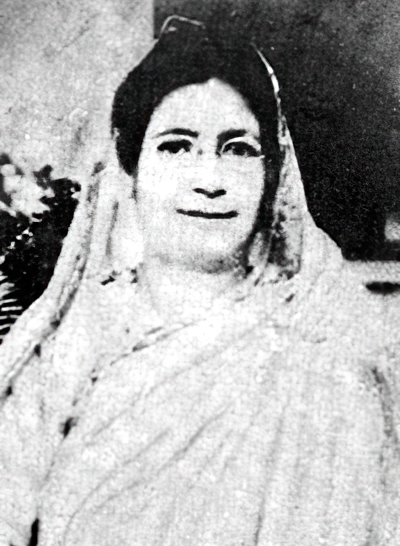
Roquia Sakhawat Hussain,feminist thinker,writer who opposed purdah system in Muslim society in Bengal

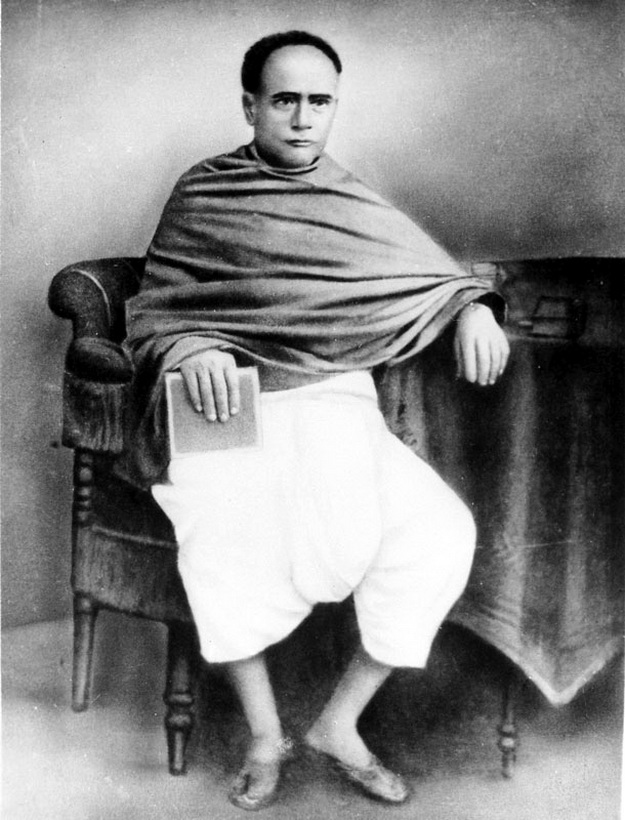
Ishwar Chandra Vidyasagar,a pioneer of Bengal Renaissance, who introduced major reforms in the educational system and helped pass the Hindu Widows' Remarriage Act, 1856.He also opposed caste system in Hinduism.

- Fazle Hasan Abed KCMG, founder of the world's largest non-governmental organisation, BRAC
- Syed Ameer Ali, law reformer
- Rawshan Ara Bachchu, woman rights activist and part of the Bengali language movement
- Kalyan Banerjee, former president of Rotary International
- Syeda Shahar Banu, woman rights activist and part of the Bengali language movement
- Muhammad Abdul Bari, former secretary of Muslim Aid, former secretary-general of the Muslim Council of Britain, former president of the Islamic Forum of Europe and former chairman of the East London Mosque
- Khuda Buksh, pioneer of life insurance in Bangladesh
- Malati Choudhury, Indian civil rights activist, freedom activist and Gandhian
- Zobeda Khanom Chowdhury, woman rights activist and part of the Bengali language movement
- Anil Kumar Gain, founder of Vidyasagar University and President of the Indian Science Congress
- Dwarkanath Ganguly, a Bengali Brahmo reformer. He made substantial contributions towards societal enlightenment and the emancipation of women and higher education for women along with his wife Kadambini Ganguly.
- Kadambini Ganguly, first Indian female doctor, liberal Brahmo reformer, fought for the social liberation for the women from orthodox society and inhuman customs.
- Pradyot Chandra Haldar, Former Director of the Intelligence Bureau of India
- Sir Azizul Haque, lawyer, writer, educator and public servant
- Roquia Sakhawat Hussain, prolific writer, women's rights activist and social worker, early feminist science fiction writer who opposed the purdah system in Muslim society in Bengal.
- Nasreen Pervin Huq, women's rights activist
- Irene Khan, former Secretary General of Amnesty International and first woman, first Asian, and first Muslim to hold the position
- Osman Ghani Khan, former chairman of the United Nations Board of Auditors, first Bangladeshi to hold a UN post.
- Taiyaba Majumder, recipient of the Begum Rokeya Padak for contributions to women's rights and economic development
- Muhammad Mohsin, philanthropist and founder of Hooghly Mohsin College
- Mohua Mukherjee, social activist and author
- Audri Mukhopadhyay, diplomat and economist
- Renuka Ray, freedom fighter and social activist
- Raja Ram Mohan Roy, Indian social reformer, writer and one of the founders of the Brahmo Sabha in 1828 to reform of Hinduism, and abolish its Sati system and worked to reduce the number of child marriages.
- Bunker Roy, social activist and educator who founded the Barefoot College, selected as one of Time's 100 most influential personalities in 2010
- Manabendra Nath Roy, pioneer Indian Bengali revolutionary philosopher, founder of the Mexican Communist Party and the Indian Communist Party
- Debendranath Tagore, Indian socio-religious reformer, established Tattwabodhini Sabha in 1839 to foster serious systematic study of India's past with modern rational outlooks, directed the Brahmo Samaj after Raja Ram Mohan Roy, working actively to counter Hindu orthodox practices and Christian missionary proselytization.
- Harichand Thakur, founder of Matua Mahasangha
- Binay Ranjan Sen, former director general of the Food and Agriculture Organization
- Keshub Chunder Sen, intellectual,socio-religious reformer, campaigned against child marriage and supported inter-caste marriages, instrumental in urging the British administration to pass the Native Marriage Act of 1872, legalizing inter-caste and inter-religious marriages.
- Muhammad Shahidullah, educationist, writer, polyglot, philologist and linguist
- Romola Sinha, women's rights and social activist, founder member of All Bengal Women's Union
- Ishwar Chandra Vidyasagar, a pioneer of Bengal Renaissance, who introduced major reforms in the educational system and helped pass the Hindu Widows' Remarriage Act, 1856. Against child marriage, his efforts led to the Age of Consent Act, 1891 setting the minimum age of consummation of marriage at 12 years. He built around 800 schools for women across Bengal.

== Sports ==
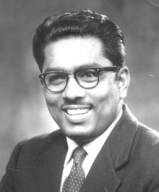
Brojen Das was the first Bengali to swim across the English Channel.

=== Administrators ===
- Sourav Ganguly, President of Board of Control for Cricket in India and former Indian cricket team captain, Padma Shri awardee

=== Athletics ===
- Mohamed Mahbub Alam, South Asian Games gold medalist sprinter
- Swapna Barman, heptathlon athlete who won a gold medal in 2018 Asian Games and a bronze in 2023 Asian Games.
- Soma Biswas, heptathlon athlete who won consecutive silver medal at the 2002 and 2006 Asian Games.
- Shanta Ghosh, retired German sprinter who specialized in the 400 meters
- Mohan Khan, Olympic sprinter
- Abha Khatua, Indian shot-putter
- Rahamatulla Molla, track athlete
- Beauty Nazmun Nahar, Olympic sprinter from Bangladesh
- Pinki Pramanik, Indian former track and field athlete who won gold medal at the 2006 Asian Games.
- Hari Shankar Roy, Indian track and field athlete
- Sushmitha Singha Roy, an Indian heptathlete, won a silver and a bronze medal for her respective category at the Asian Athletics Championships in 2005 and 2007.
- Saraswati Saha, Indian former track and field sprinter
- Jyotirmoyee Sikdar, athletics, double gold-medallist in track at Asian games in 1998, recipient of Rajiv Gandhi Khel Ratna award and Padma Shri award

=== Archery ===
- Dola Banerjee, Indian female archer
- Rahul Banerjee, Indian archer
- Krishna Das, former Indian archer
- Ruman Shana, Bangladeshi archer, won gold in SA games 2019
- Jayanta Talukdar, archer

=== Badminton ===
- Dipu Ghosh, former badminton player
- Raman Ghosh, former badminton player
- Manoj Sarkar, para badminton player and bronze medalist at the 2020 Paralympic Games, Tokyo

=== Bodybuilding, boxing, rugby and wrestling ===
- Manohar Aich, bodybuilder
- Tameer Anwar, bodybuilder, Mister Bangladesh
- Laxman Das, wrestler and weight lifter
- Sukhen Dey, weightlifter
- Ambika Charan Guha, Indian wrestler who pioneered the growth of Akhada culture in Bengal
- Gobar Guha, Indian wrestler and practitioner of Pehlwani
- Mosharraf Hossain, boxer
- Bulbul Hussain, wheelchair rugby player for Kent Crusaders and the Great Britain Paralympic team
- Abdul Ali Jacko, two-time world lightweight kick-boxing champion
- Mohammed Ali Qamar, gold-medallist boxer
- Reba Rakshit, Indian female bodybuilder and exponent of yoga
- Monotosh Roy, Indian bodybuilder, first Bengali to be awarded the Mr. Universe title
- Paresh Lal Roy, known as the "father of Indian boxing"
- Asit Kumar Saha, wrestler and wrestling coach
- Sudhir Saha, wrestler, coach and wrestling administrator in India, introduced Greco-Roman wrestling in India
- Hamza Uddin, British and Commonwealth flyweight title holder

=== Chess ===
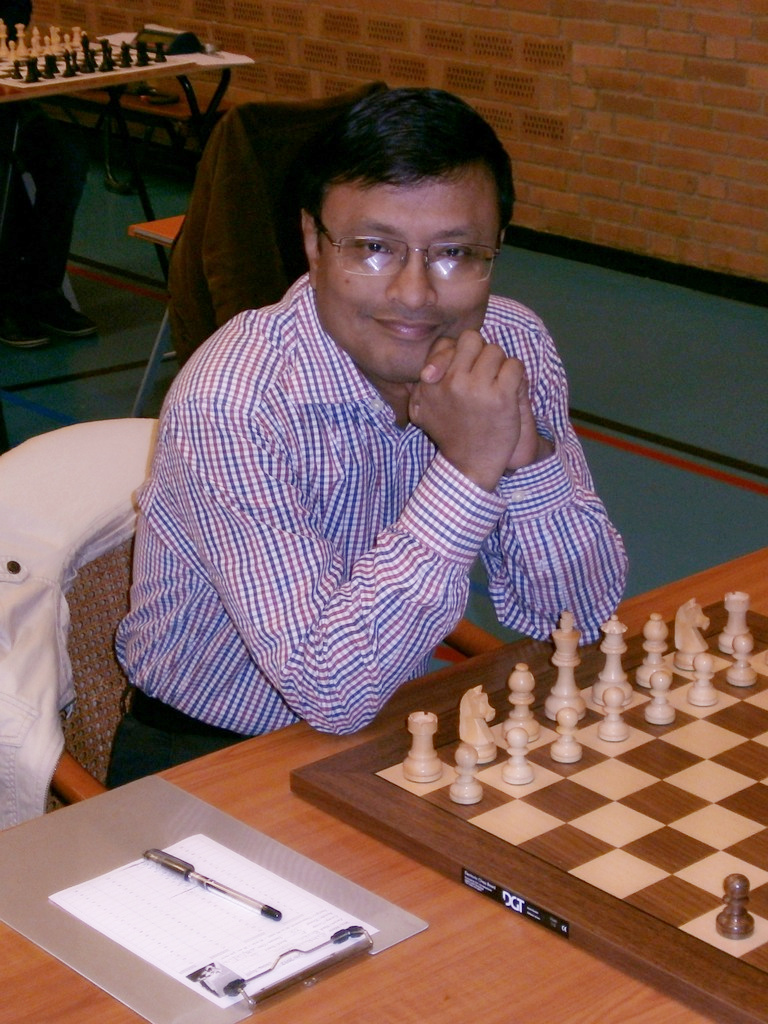
Dibyendu Barua,Indian GM in 1991

- Dibyendu Barua, Indian chess grandmaster in 1991
- Sandipan Chanda, Indian chess grandmaster in 2003
- Koustav Chatterjee, Indian chess grandmaster in 2023
- Saptarshi Roy Chowdhury, Indian chess grandmaster in 2013
- Neelotpal Das, Indian chess grandmaster in 2006
- Sayantan Das, Indian chess grandmaster in 2023
- Surya Shekhar Ganguly, Indian grandmaster in 2003
- Diptayan Ghosh, Indian chess grandmaster in 2016
- Aronyak Ghosh, Indian chess grandmaster in 2026
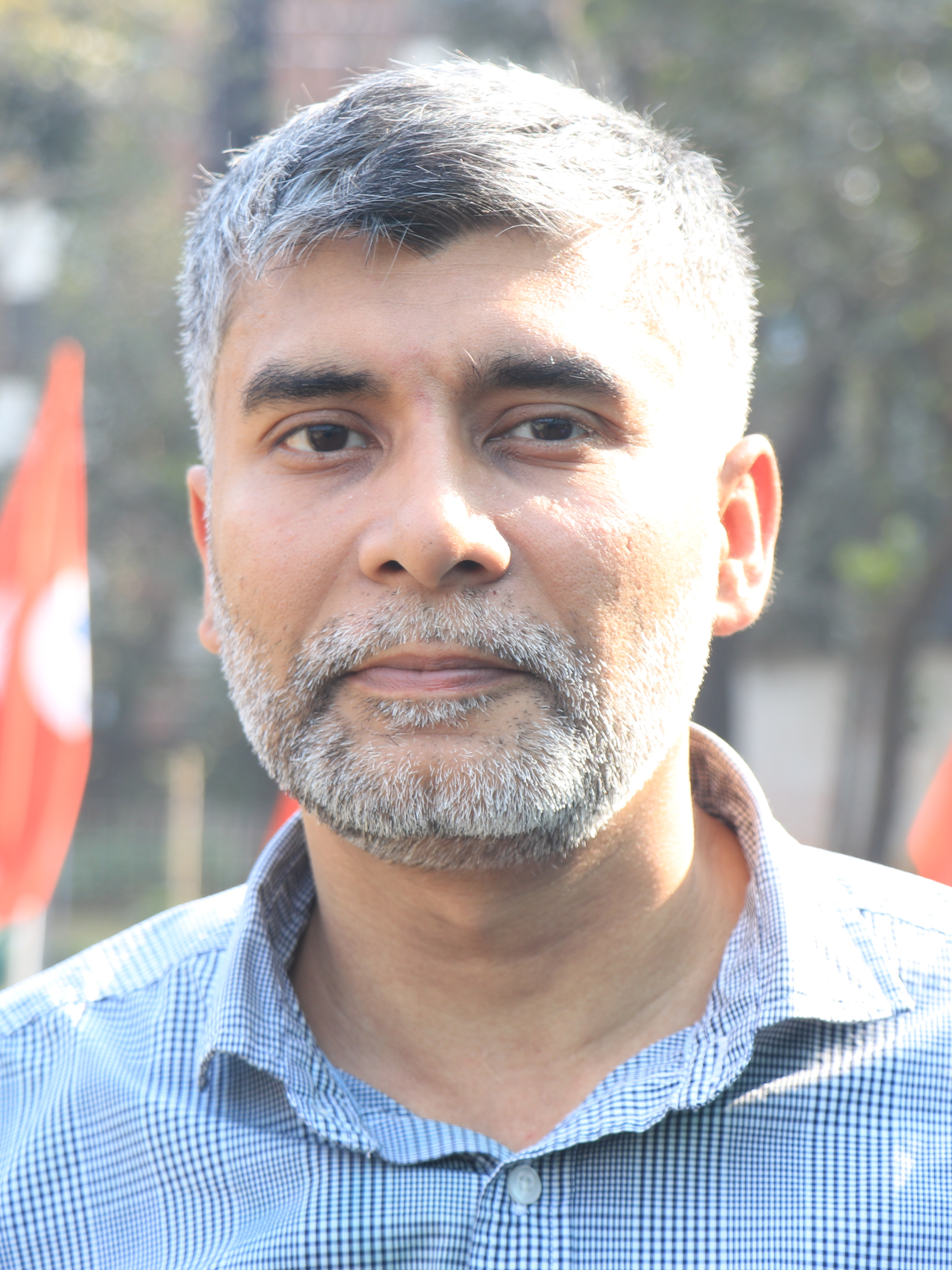
- Reefat Bin-Sattar,Bangladeshi GM in 2005
  Mary Ann Gomes, Indian chess WGM in 2008 from the state of West Bengal
- Mitrabha Guha, Indian chess grandmaster in 2021
- Rani Hamid, awarded the FIDE Woman International Master (WIM) title in 1985
- Enamul Hossain, Bangladeshi grandmaster in 2008
- Nisha Mohota, first woman chess WGM from the state of West Bengal in 2003
- Niaz Morshed, chess player from Bangladesh, first chess grandmaster in 1987 to emerge from the Indian subcontinent
- Ziaur Rahman (chess player), Bangladeshi grandmaster in 2002
- Mollah Abdullah Al Rakib, Bangladeshi grandmaster in 2007
- Saptarshi Roy, Indian chess grandmaster in 2018
- Reefat Bin-Sattar, Bangladeshi chess grandmaster in 2005
- Deep Sengupta, Indian chess grandmaster in 2010

=== Cricket ===
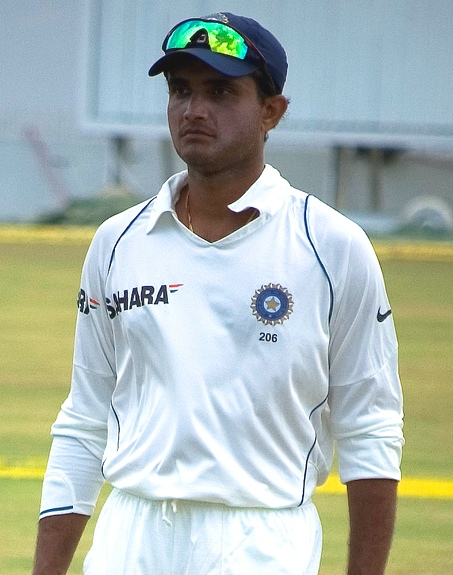
Sourav Ganguly,captained India

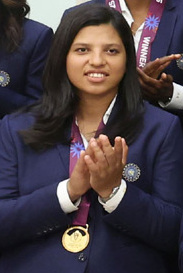
Richa Ghosh

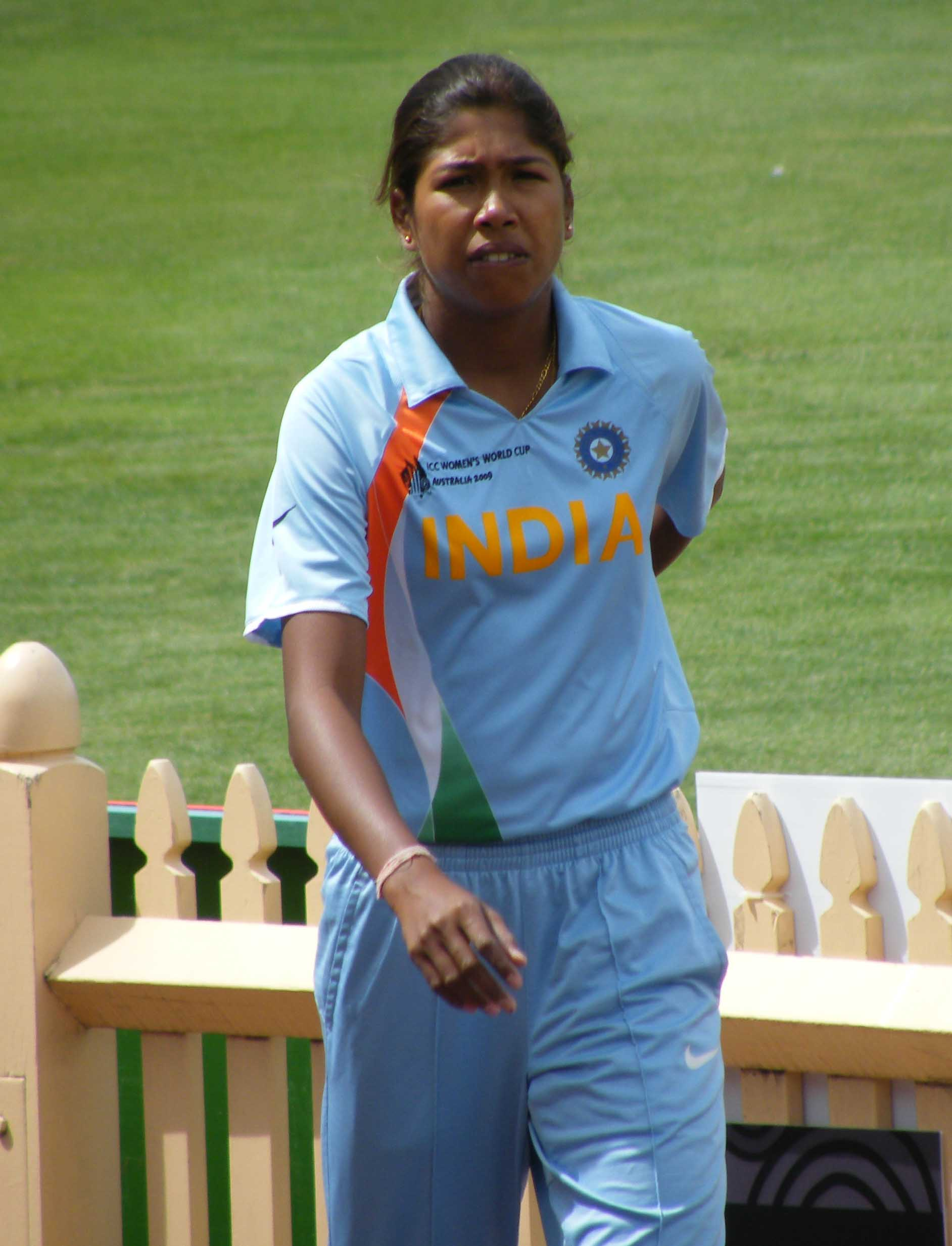
Jhulan Goswami,captained Indian Women's Cricket team

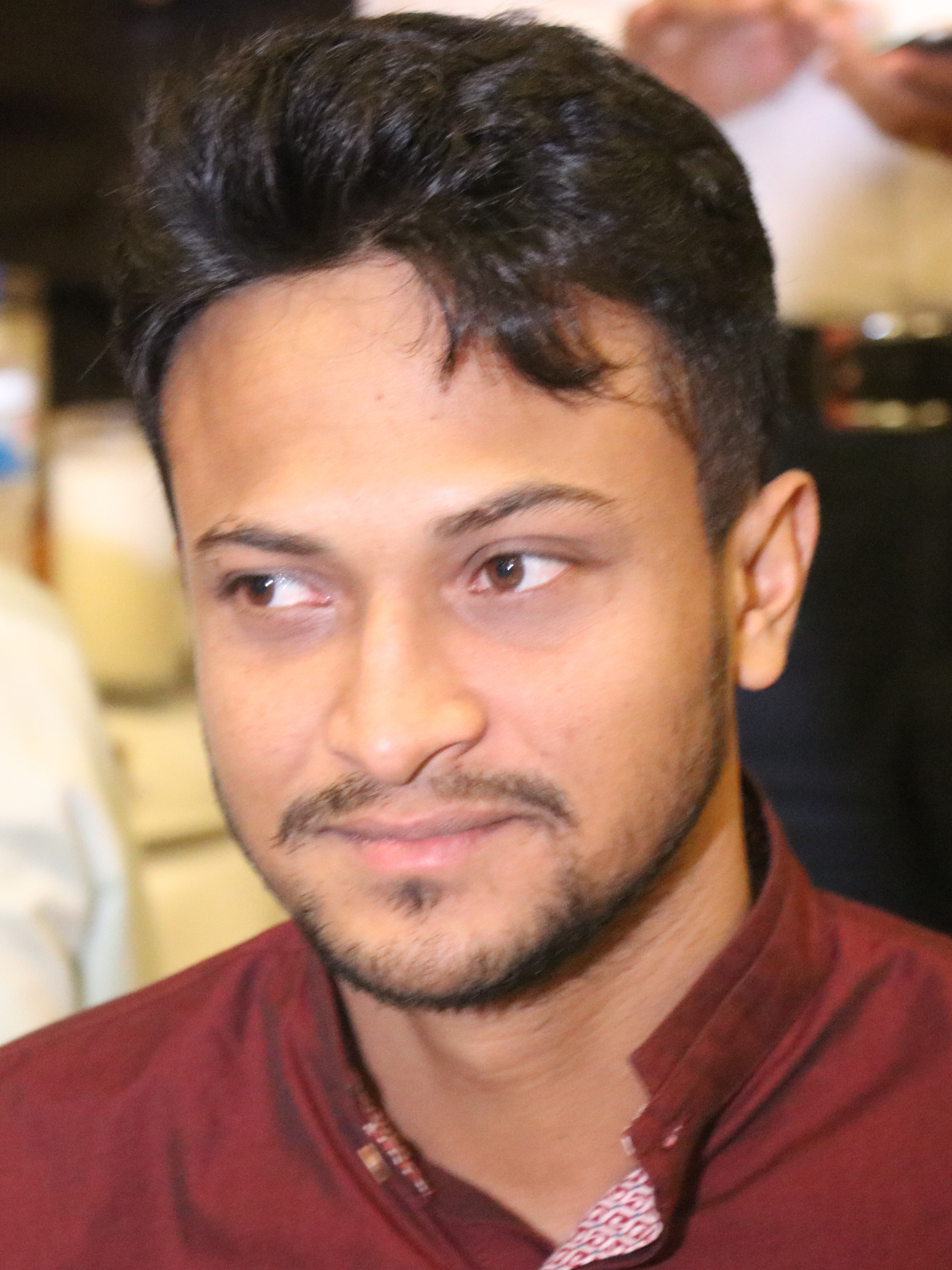
Shakib Al Hasan

- Aftab Ahmed, former Bangladeshi cricketer
- Nasum Ahmed, bowler for Bangladesh
- Taskin Ahmed, Bangladeshi bowler
- Mohammad Ashraful, Bangladeshi cricketer, youngest centurion in test cricket
- Tapash Baishya, Bangladeshi cricketer
- Vikram Banerjee, English cricketer
- Gargi Banerji, former Indian Women cricketer, holds international records
- Habibul Bashar, former Bangladeshi cricketer
- Gopal Bose, former Indian ODI player
- Ranadeb Bose, Indian cricketer
- Utpal Chatterjee, former Indian cricketer
- Writtick Chatterjee, Indian and Bengal cricketer
- Nirode Chowdhury, former Indian Test cricketer and pace bowler
- Liton Das, Bangladeshi cricketer
- Deep Dasgupta, former Indian national cricket team wicket-keeper
- Rumeli Dhar, cricketer, Indian women's cricket team
- Ashok Dinda, Indian cricket team player
- Nikhil Dutta, Canadian cricketer
- Devang Gandhi, former Indian cricketer
- Sourav Ganguly, former Indian cricket team captain, Padma Shri awardee
- Sudip Kumar Gharami, Indian and Bengal cricketer
- Dhiman Ghosh, Bangladeshi cricketer
- Pinak Ghosh, Bangladeshi cricketer
- Richa Ghosh, 2025 Women's Cricket World Cup winning Indian women's cricketer
- Sayan Ghosh, Indian and Bengal cricketer
- Jhulan Goswami, Indian woman cricketer, awarded ICC Women's Cricketer of the Year 2007
- Shreevats Goswami, Indian and Bengal cricketer
- Isa Guha, English women's team cricketer
- Subrata Guha, former Indian Test cricketer
- Mominul Haque, Bangladeshi cricketer, has the highest test batting average and century by a Bangladeshi batsman
- Shakib Al Hasan, Bangladeshi cricketer
- Shuvagata Hom, Bangladeshi cricketer
- Rubel Hossain, Bangladeshi cricketer
- Shahadat Hossain, Bangladeshi cricketer
- Saika Ishaque, Indian Women's cricketer
- Tamim Iqbal, Bangladeshi cricketer
- Taijul Islam, Bangladeshi bowler
- Alok Kapali, former Bangladeshi cricketer
- Saurasish Lahiri, Indian first class cricketer who played for Bengal.
- Anustup Majumdar, Indian and Bengal cricketer
- Kamal Hasan Mondal, Indian cricketer
- Lata Mondal, Bangladeshi woman cricketer
- Saradindu Mukherjee, former Indian cricketer
- Mithu Mukherjee, former Indian women's cricket team player
- Abishek Porel, Indian cricketer
- Ishan Porel, Indian cricketer
- Pradipta Pramanik, Indian and Bengali cricketer
- Mushfiqur Rahim, Bangladeshi cricketer
- Mahmudullah Riyad, Bangladeshi cricketer
- Ambar Roy, former Indian cricketer
- Pankaj Roy, former Indian cricket captain, known for establishing the world record opening partnership of 413 runs against New Zealand
- Pranab Roy, former Test cricketer for India Championship (1983, 1985, 1989)
- Priyanka Roy, former cricketer of Indian women's cricket team
- Subashis Roy, Bangladeshi cricketer
- Titas Sadhu, Indian women's cricketer,a part of the 2023 U19 Women's T20 World Cup winning Indian team and was named Player of the Match in the final
- Wriddhiman Saha, Indian cricket player
- Soumya Sarkar, Bangladeshi cricketer
- Probir Sen, former Indian Test cricketer/wicket-keeper
- Laxmi Ratan Shukla, former Bengal and Indian cricketer
- Parvez Sultan, cricketer for Tripura
- Rony Talukdar, Bangladeshi cricketer
- Manoj Tiwary, former Indian cricket team player
- Jahan Uddin, cricketer for Sikkim
- Javed Zaman, cricketer for Railways

=== Football ===
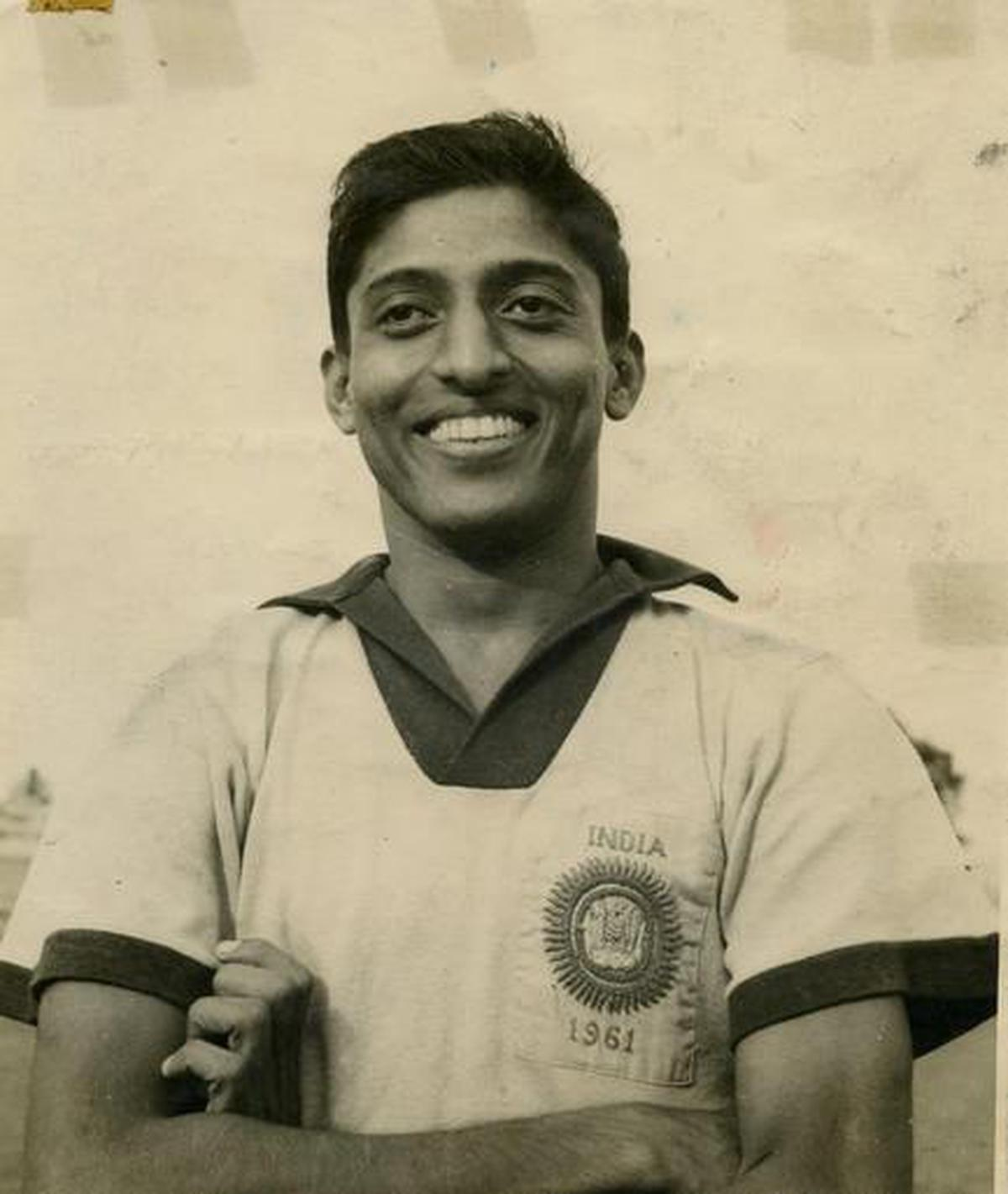
Chuni Goswami,legendary Indian footballer,a member of gold winning 1962 Asian Games Indian football team.

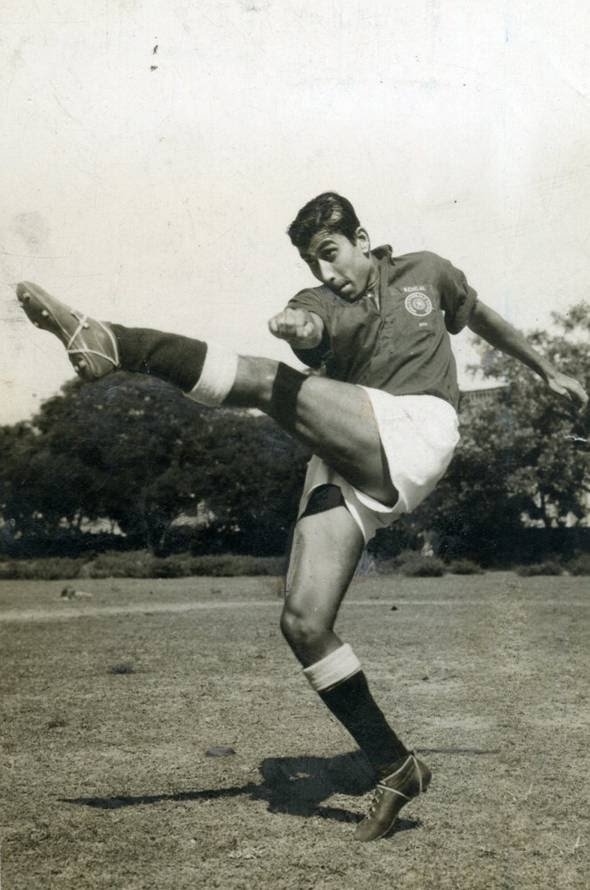
P. K. Banerjee,captained Indian football team in 1950s and 1960s

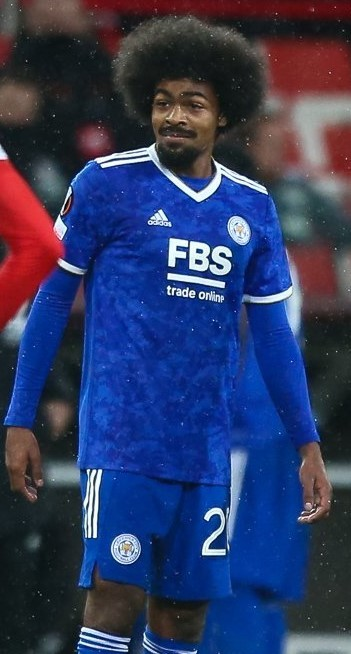
Hamza Choudhury playing for Leicester City F.C. in 2021.

- Alfaz Ahmed, former footballer for Bangladesh
- Tarif Akhand, defender for Punjab FC
- Faisal Ali, former winger for Mohammedan SC (Kolkata)
- Rahim Ali, forward for India
- Pradip Kumar Banerjee, footballer, named Indian Footballer of the 20th Century by FIFA
- Prasun Banerjee, former Indian national football player, Arjuna award winner
- Samar Banerjee, Indian footballer, Captain of Indian team in 1956 Olympic
- Sibdas Bhaduri, captained Mohun Bagan in the historic 1911 IFA Shield Final, where they defeated the East Yorkshire Regiment, 2–1
- Arindam Bhattacharya, Indian national football player
- Karuna Bhattacharya, Indian footballer, member of 1938 Australia touring side
- Lal Kamal Bhowmik, Indian footballer
- Subhash Bhowmick, former Indian international football player
- Subhasish Bose, Indian national football player
- Ashok Chatterjee, Indian footballer
- Sudip Chatterjee, footballer, considered among the finest in Indian football, declared AIFF player of the decade in 1994
- Hamza Choudhury, midfielder for English football club Leicester City F.C.
- Yeamin Chowdhury, footballer for Chittagong Abahani
- Narayan Das, Indian national football player
- Krishanu Dey, footballer, known as the "Indian Maradona"
- Robin Dutt, former manager of Bundesliga club Werder Bremen, current representative for sport of VfB Stuttgart
- S. K. Faiaz, winger for Mohammedan SC (Kolkata)
- Chuni Goswami, former Indian Footballer, Padma Shri awardee, awarded the best striker of Asia in 1962
- Pronay Halder, Indian national football player
- Kaiser Hamid, former footballer for Mohammedan S.C.
- Mehtab Hossain, former Indian national football player
- S. M. Kaiser, olympic footballer and midfielder for East Bengal Club
- Roy Krishna, Fijian national football player
- Pritam Kotal, Indian national football player
- Azharuddin Mallick, forward for Delhi FC
- Samad Ali Mallick, defender for Mohammedan SC (Kolkata)
- Sailen Manna, footballer, the only Bengali footballer ever to be named among the 10 best captains in the world by the English FA in 1953
- Manoj Mohammed, defender for Hyderabad FC
- Surabuddin Mollick, midfielder
- Arnab Mondal, Indian national football player
- Deepak Kumar Mondal, footballer and Arjuna award winner
- Habibur Rehman Mondal, former defender for Mohammedan SC (Kolkata)
- Syed Rahim Nabi, Indian international footballer, known as 'Mr. Versatile' for his ability to play at any position (except goalkeeper), declared Indian player of the year in 2012
- Syed Nayeemuddin, former captain for India
- Santosh Nandy, Indian footballer, Olympian
- Gostha Pal, footballer; member of the 1st Indian team, Mohun Bagan, that won the IFA shield against a British team in the pre-independence period
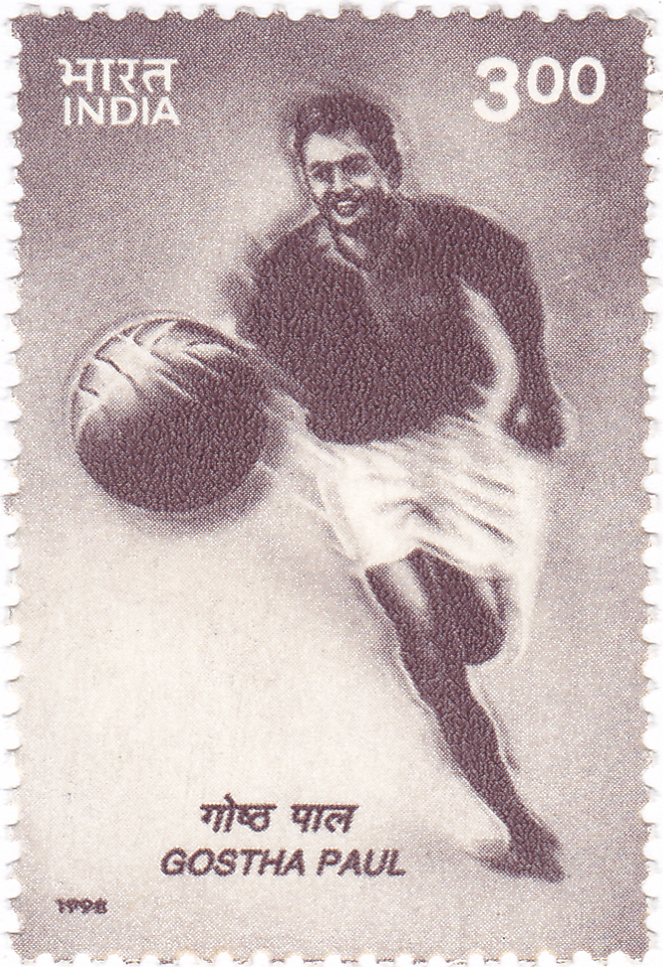
- Gostha Pal,legendary Indian footballer in 1920s and 30s,nicknamed "the Chinese wall" on 1998 stamp of India
  Subrata Paul, Indian national football player, first Indian goalkeeper to play professionally for a foreign club in 1st division
- Mohammed Rafique, former midfielder for East Bengal Club
- Safiul Rahaman, defender for Mohammedan SC (Kolkata)
- Mahbubur Rahman, footballer and captain of Arambagh KS
- Mohammed Rahmatullah, forward for India
- Mohammed Salim, first Indian footballer to play overseas (in 1936 for the Scottish Club Celtic F.C.)
- Sukumar Samajpati, Indian footballer, 1964 Asian Cup team member
- Rafique Ali Sardar, former goalkeeper for Mohammedan SC (Kolkata)
- Gautam Sarkar, ex-footballer, having represented SC East Bengal
- Jewel Raja Shaikh, Indian national football player
- Shamit Shome, first Bengali origin player in Major League Soccer
- Neil Taylor, Welsh footballer of half-Bengali origin
- Runu Guha Thakurta, Indian footballer, Olympian
- Anwar Uddin, former defender for West Ham United and founder of Sporting Bengal United F.C.

=== Golf and snooker ===
- Anirban Lahiri
- Hammad Miah, professional snooker player
- Siddikur Rahman, Olympic and Asian Tour golfer of Bangladesh

=== Gymnastics ===
- Mabia Akhter, Commonwealth gold medalist, South Asian Games gold medalist
- Dipa Karmakar, first Indian woman gymnast to qualify for the Olympics
- Margarita Mamun, Russian gymnast of half-Bangladeshi origin
- Pranati Nayak, second Indian women gymnast to qualify for the Olympics

=== Cycling and mountaineering ===
- Ramnath Biswas, soldier and writer best known for circumnavigating the globe by bicycle.
- Chhanda Gain
- Musa Ibrahim, first Bangladeshi to scale Mount Everest
- Nishat Majumdar, first Bangladeshi woman to scale Mount Everest
- Asim Mukhopadhyay
- Wasfia Nazreen, second Bangladeshi woman to scale Mount Everest
- Akke Rahman, first British Muslim/Bengali to scale Mount Everest

=== Shooting ===
- Joydeep Karmakar, Olympian and Arjuna Awardee
- Mehuli Ghosh, Olympian

=== Squash ===
- Ritwik Bhattacharya
- Saurav Ghosal, highest-ranked Indian player

=== Swimming ===
- Masudur Rahman Baidya, world's first physically handicapped swimmer to swim across the English Channel in 1997 and the Strait of Gibraltar in 2001
- Bula Choudhury, first woman to cross the seven seas
- Brojen Das, first Bengali to swim across the English Channel and the first person to cross it four times
- Prasanta Karmakar, para-swimmer
- Sachin Nag, former swimming champion
- Arati Saha, first Indian woman to swim across English Channel; first Indian female sportsperson to be awarded the Padma Shri
- Mihir Sen, first Indian to swim across the English Channel, from Dover to Calais in 1958, and for swimming across five channels in one calendar year (1956)

=== Table tennis ===
- Ankita Das, Olympian
- Mouma Das, Olympian
- Poulomi Ghatak
- Soumyajit Ghosh, Olympian
- Zobera Rahman Linu, Guinness World Record holder
- Subhajit Saha

=== Tennis ===
- Zeeshan Ali, olympian
- Samir Banerjee, Winner of the 2021 Wimbledon Championships – Boys' singles title
- Syed Fazaluddin, player and coach
- Shibu Lal, Bangladeshi ATP player
- Jaidip Mukerjea, Arjuna award winner
- Leander Paes, Olympic Medalist
- Afrana Islam Prity, Bangladeshi ITF player

== Writers ==
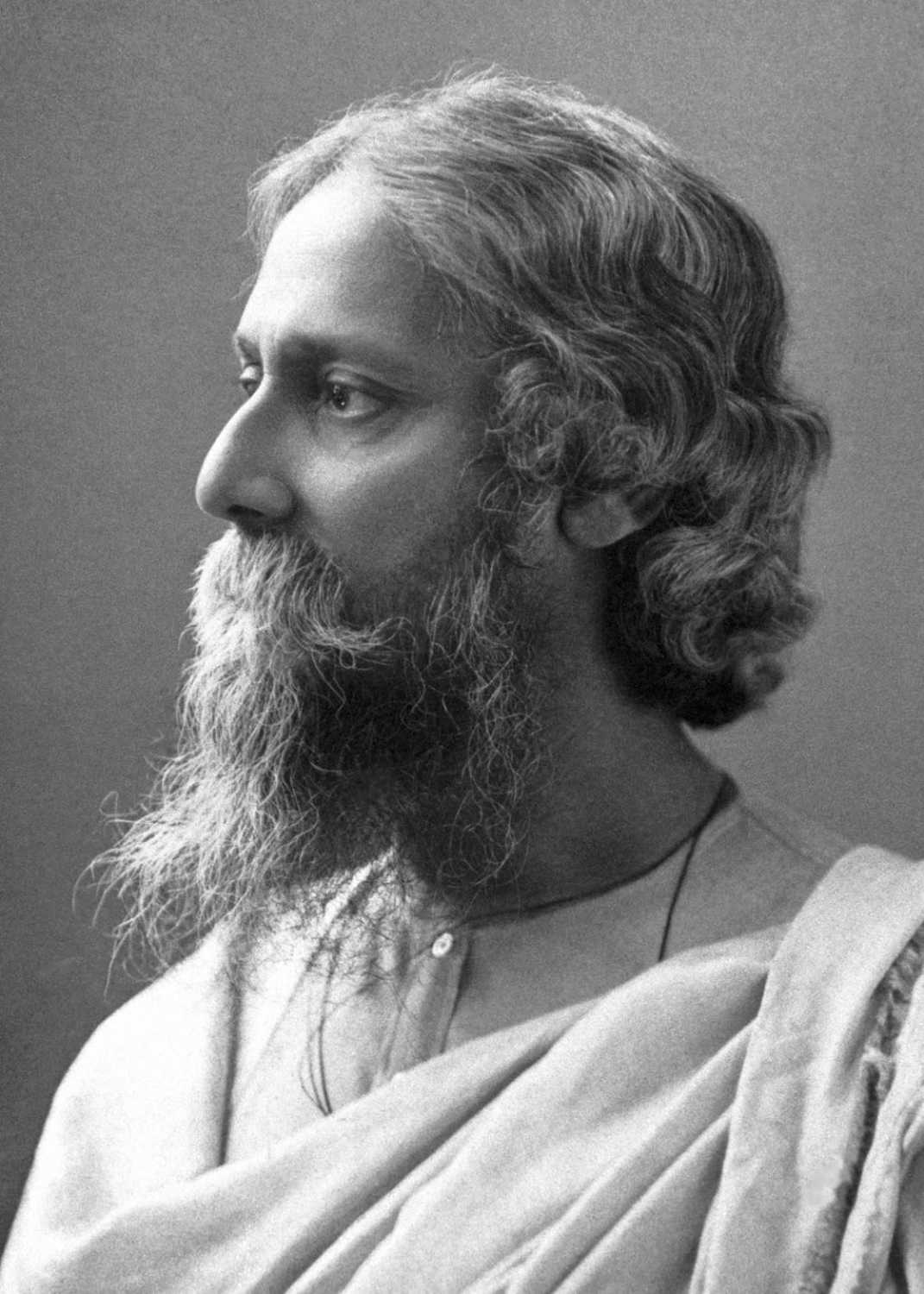
Rabindranath Tagore is the first Indian as well as Asian Nobel laureate.

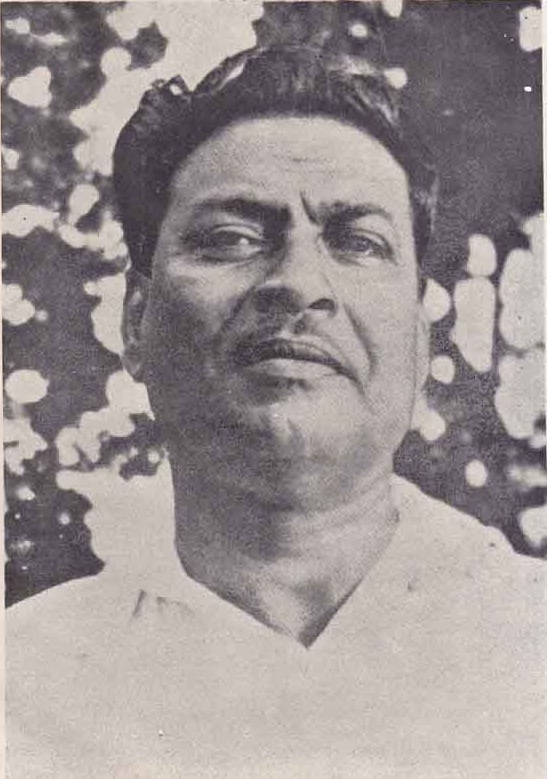
Bibhutibhushan Bandopadhyay,best known works are the autobiographical novel Pather Panchali (Song of the Road)

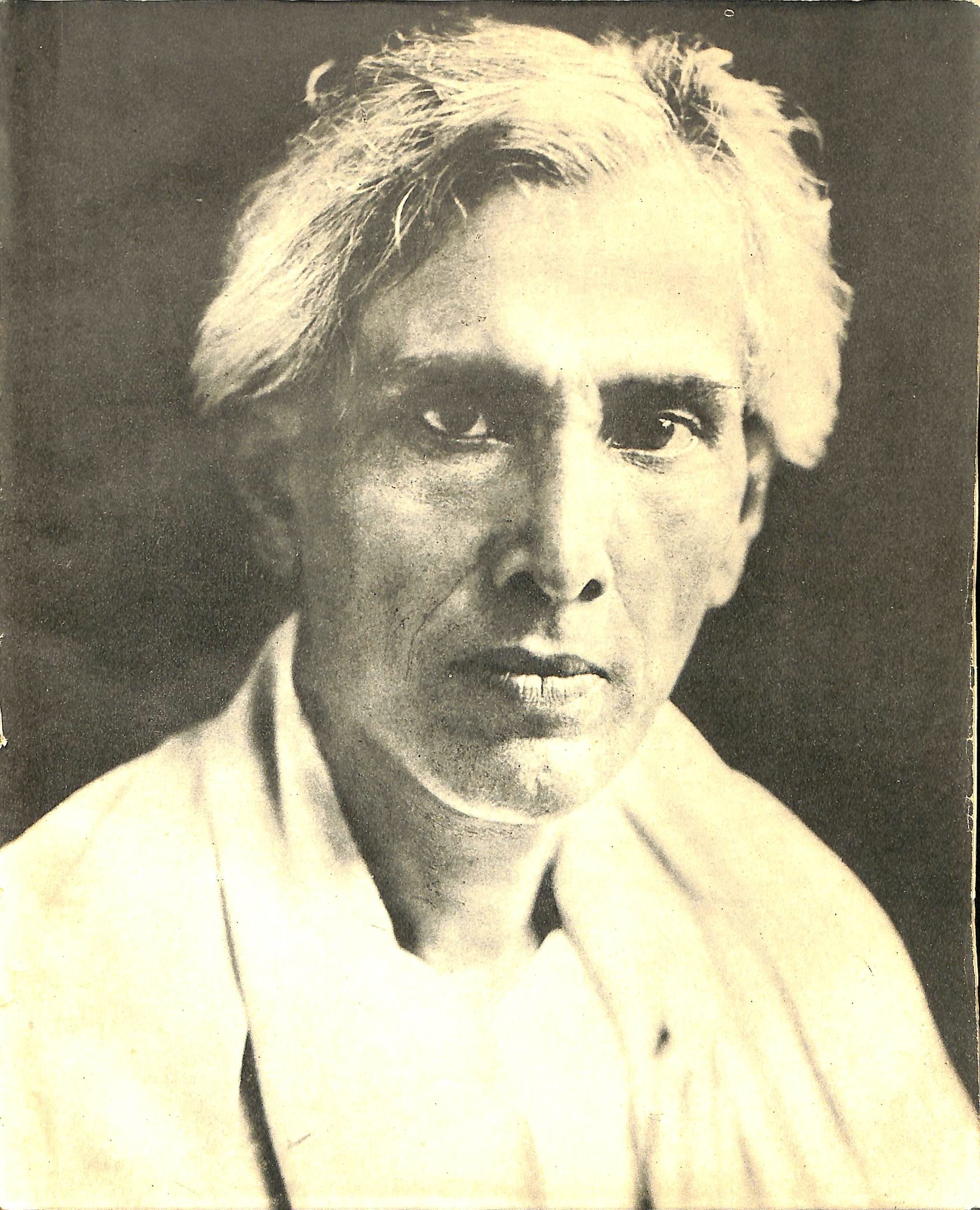
Sarat Chandra Chattopadhyay,a Bengali novelist and short story writer who generally wrote about the lives of Bengali family and society in cities and villages.

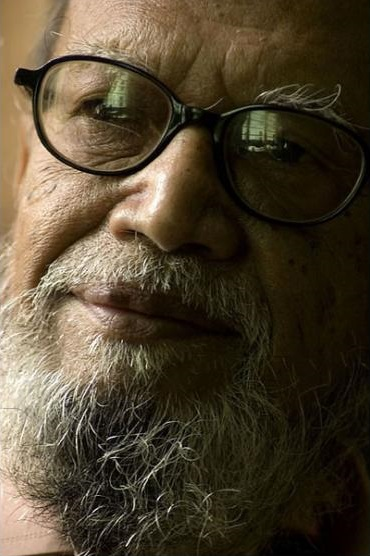
Al Mahmud is considered one of the greatest Bengali poets to have emerged in the 20th century.

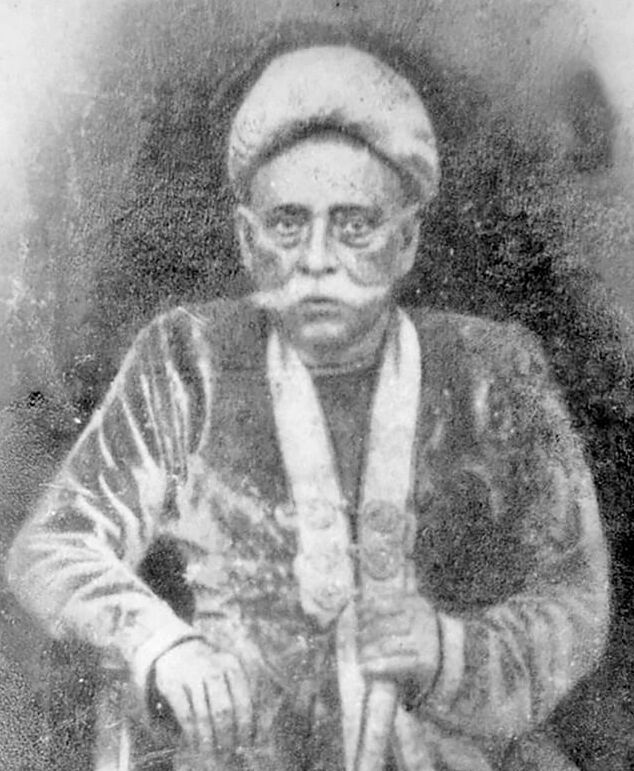
Hason Raja, mystical poet and songwriter

- Ekramuddin Ahmad (1872–1940), Bengali litterateur and government officer
- Muhammad Reazuddin Ahmad (1861–1933), journalist and philosopher
- Humayun Ahmed (born 1948), novelist
- Chowdhury Gulam Akbar, writer and collector of Bengali folk literature for the Bangla Academy
- Ismail Alam (1868–1937), Urdu poet and activist
- Alaol (1607–1680), poet of medieval era
- Muhammad Asadullah Al-Ghalib (born 1948), Islamic scholar, writer, academic, essayist
- Afzal Ali, 16th-century poet
- Arjumand Ali (1870–1914), first Bengali Muslim novelist
- Asaddor Ali, writer, folklorist and winner of Bangla Academy Literary Award
- Ekram Ali (born 1950), poet
- Monica Ali (born 1967), novelist
- Sadeq Ali, poet best known for the Halat-un-Nabi puthi
- Syed Mujtaba Ali (1904–1974), novelist and essayist
- Syed Murtaza Ali, writer and historian
- Anuj Dhar, author, journalist
- Banaphul (1899–1979), writer of short stories
- Manik Bandopadhyay (1908–1956), novelist and short story writer
- Bibhutibhushan Bandyopadhyay (1894–1950), novelist
- Tarasankar Bandyopadhyay (1898–1971), novelist
- Subimal Basak, fiction writer
- Abul Bashar (born 1951), novelist and essayist
- Samit Basu (born 1979), novelist
- Rokeya Begum (1880–1932), author and political activist
- Izzatullah Bengali, 18th-century Persian author
- Sukanta Bhattacharya (1926–1947), poet and playwright
- Abdul Karim Sahitya Bisharad (1871–1953), author, Gorokho Bijoy
- Buddhadeva Bose (1908–1974), poet and essayist
- Sasthi Brata, (1939–2015), fiction writer, based in UK
- Novoneel Chakraborty, author, scriptwriter
- Nirendranath Chakravarty (1924–2018), poet
- Chandidas (1408–?), medieval Bengali poet
- Aroup Chatterjee (born 1958), British Indian atheist physician, author of Mother Teresa: The Untold Story
- Rimi B. Chatterjee, novelist and short story writer, winner of the 2007 SHARP deLong Prize
- Upamanyu Chatterjee (born 1959), author and administrator
- Suniti Kumar Chatterji (1890–1977), linguist and educator
- Bankim Chandra Chattopadhyay (1838–1894), novelist, essayist, penned the Indian national song of integrity "Vande Mataram"
- Sandipan Chattopadhyay (1933–2005), novelist
- Sanjeev Chattopadhyay, (born 1936), fiction writer
- Sarat Chandra Chattopadhyay (1876–1938), novelist
- Shakti Chattopadhyay, (1933–1995) poet
- Karimunnesa Khanam Chaudhurani (1855–1926), poet and social worker
- Amit Chaudhuri (born 1962), professor of Contemporary Literature at the University of East Anglia, 2002 Sahitya Akademi Award winner
- Nirad C. Chaudhuri (1897–1999), essayist and scholar
- Pramatha Chaudhuri (1868–1946), editor of Sabuj Patra, wrote in the era of Rabindranath Tagore
- Abdur Rouf Choudhury, writer
- Achyut Charan Choudhury, writer and historian
- Malay Roy Choudhury (born 1939), Bengali poet and novelist who founded the "Hungryalist Movement" in the 1960s
- Kabir Chowdhury, academic and essayist
- Jibanananda Das (1899–1954), poet
- Indra Das, author in English literature
- Durjoy Datta (born 1987), author in modern English Literature
- Ashapurna Devi (1909–1995), novelist and short story writer
- Mahasweta Devi (1926–2016), novelist and short story writer
- Nirupama Devi (1883–1951), fiction writer
- Leema Dhar (born 1993), novelist, poet, and columnist
- Chitra Banerjee Divakaruni (born 1956) (born Chitralekha Banerjee), author and poet
- Michael Madhusudan Dutt (1824–1873), poet and dramatist
- Romesh Chunder Dutt (1848–1909), writer and translator of Ramayana and Mahabharata
- Toru Dutt (1856–1877), wrote in English and French
- Himangshu Dutta (1908–1944), composer
- Sudhindranath Dutta (1901–1960), poet
- Kaberi Gayen (born 1970), author of Muktijuddher Cholochchitre Naree Nirman
- Narayan Gangopadhyay (1918–1970), author, creator of the Tenida character
- Sunil Gangopadhyay (1934–2012), poet and novelist
- Dhirendra Nath Ganguly, director
- Anil Ghorai (1957 to 2014), novelist, poet and writer
- Amitav Ghosh (born 1956), novelist and essayist
- Prabir Ghosh (born 1945), writer, essayist, poet and rationalist
- Shankha Ghosh (1932–2021), poet and essayist
- Dipak Giri (born 1984), writer and editor
- Joy Goswami (born 1954), poet
- Buddhadeb Guha (born 1936), novelist
- Tanika Gupta (born 1963), playwright, appointed Member of the Order of the British Empire in 2008
- Abdul Hakim (1620–1690), medieval poet
- Muhammad Nurul Haque, cultural activist, social worker and writer
- Syed Shamsul Haque, poet and novelist
- Mir Mosharraf Hossain (1847–1912), novelist
- Ashraf Hussain, poet and folklorist
- Hasnat Abdul Hye, writer and novelist
- Muhammed Zafar Iqbal (born 1952), science fiction writer
- Kazi Nazrul Islam (1899–1976), poet
- Jasimuddin (1903–1976), poet, novelist and essayist
- Jīmūtavāhana (c. 12th century), Sanskrit writer of Dāyabhāga
- Dawlat Wazir Bahram Khan, 16th-century poet
- Dilwar Khan, poet known as Gonomanusher Kobi (Poet of the mass people)
- Moniruddin Khan (born 1974), writer and historian
- Muhammad Mojlum Khan, non-fiction English writer best known for The Muslim 100
- Jhumpa Lahiri (born 1967), novelist, short story writer, Pulitzer Prize winner
- Al Mahmud (1936–2019), poet and novelist
- Heyat Mahmud (1693–1760), medieval poet and judge
- Binoy Majumdar (1934–2006), poet, Sahitya Akademi Award in 2005
- Kamal Kumar Majumdar (1914–1979), novelist and short story writer
- Leela Majumdar (1908–2007), writer
- R. C. Majumdar (1888–1980), author, historian
- Samaresh Majumdar (born 1944), writer, creator of the Animesh trilogy
- Dakshinaranjan Mitra Majumder (1877–1956), author
- Tarun Mandal
- Reazuddin Ahmad Mashadi (1859–1918), philosopher
- Arun Mitra (1909–2000), poet
- Premendra Mitra (1904–1988), poet and short story writer
- Motiur Rahman Mollik (1950–2010), poet and novelist
- Nurul Momen (1908–1990), playwright
- Dhan Gopal Mukerji (1890–1936), author
- Bharati Mukherjee (1940–2017), author and educator
- Shirshendu Mukhopadhyay (born 1935), novelist
- Subhash Mukhopadhyay (1919–2003), Bengali poet
- Kumud Ranjan Mullick (1883–1970), poet of the Tagore era
- Muhammad Muqim, 18th-century poet
- Ghulam Murshid, writer, essayist and cultural historian
- Shahabuddin Nagari (born 1955), Bangladeshi poet and writer of juvenile fiction
- Naimuddin (1832–1907), Bengali writer and scholar
- Jyotirindranath Nandi, (1912–1982), novelist and short story writer
- Moti Nandi (1931–2010), novelist
- Pritish Nandy (born 1951), poet and author and journalist EM Forster Literary Award, Padma Shri
- Taslima Nasrin (born 1962), novelist
- Rajat Neogy (1938–1995), poet, writer, thinker and founder of Transition Magazine in Kampala in 1961; Ugandan Indian
- Krittibas Ojha (1381–1461), medieval Bengali poet
- Daulat Qazi (d. 1638), medieval poet
- Rahimunnessa (1763–1800), medieval poet
- Shamsur Rahman (1929–2006), poet
- M Harunur Rashid, teacher of English and Sufi writer
- Bharatchandra Ray (1712–1760), poet and song composer known for his Mangalkavya
- Dilipkumar Ray (1897–1980), musician, musicologist, novelist, poet and essayist
- Dwijendralal Ray (1863–1913), playwright and poet
- Satyajit Ray (1921–1992), writer and film director
- Annada Shankar Ray (1905–2002), novelist, essayist and poet
- Arundhati Roy (born 1961), novelist and essayist
- Samir Roychoudhury (1933–2016), poet, novelist, short story writer and philosopher
- Shah Muhammad Saghir, 15th-century poet
- Sankar, (1933), author in English literature
- Narayan Sanyal (1924–2005), writer of modern Bengali literature
- Subodh Sarkar (born 1958), poet
- Ramprasad Sen (c. 1718 or c. 1723 – c. 1775), Shakta poet of eighteenth century Bengal
- Mallika Sengupta (1960–2011), Bengali poet, feminist, and reader of sociology from Kolkata
- Nares Chandra Sen-Gupta (1882–1964), novelist and legal scholar
- Muhammad Shahidullah (1885 –1969) Bengali linguist, philologist, educationist, and writer
- Hara Prasad Shastri (1853–1931), known as the inventor of Charyapada
- Syed Mustafa Siraj (1930–2012), poet, novelist, short story writer, Sahitya Akademi awardee
- Srijato, won Ananda Puroskar in 2004
- Syed Sultan, wrote the first Prophetic biography in Bengali in the 16th century
- Dwijendranath Tagore (1840–1926), poet, composer, philosopher, mathematician, painter
- Rabindranath Tagore (1861–1941), poet, composer, novelist, essayist, story-writer, philosopher, painter, educationist
- Ishwar Chandra Vidyasagar (1820–1891), philosopher, educator, writer, translator, publisher, and reformer of the Bengal Renaissance period
- Zainuddin, 15th-century poet

== Chefs ==
- Gaggan Anand
- Priyam Chatterjee
- Keka Ferdousi
- Alpana Habib
- Nadiya Hussain
- Siddika Kabir
- Tony Khan
- Tommy Miah

== See also ==
- List of Bangladeshi people
  - List of British Bangladeshis
- List of people from West Bengal
