= Bhaktardoba =

Bhaktardoba Bhaktardova
- Bazaar
- Location in Assam, India Bhaktardoba (India)
- Coordinates: 26°39′27″N 91°12′59″E
- Country: India
- State: Assam
- Region: Lower Assam
- District: Barpeta

Government
  - Body: Bhaktardoba Bazaar Committee
  - Lok Sabha constituencies: Barpeta
  - Vidhan Sabha constituencies: Sarukhetri

Area
  - Total: 9 km^{2} (3.5 sq mi)

Population (2011)
  - Total: 15,580
  - Density: 1,700/km^{2} (4,500/sq mi)

Languages
  - Official: Assamese
  - Native: Barpetia Assamese
- Time zone: UTC+5:30 (IST)
- PIN: 781352
- Telephone code: +91 - (0) 3665
- ISO 3166 code: IN-AS
- Vehicle registration: AS-15 (Barpeta)

Bhaktardoba is a Bazaar located in Barpeta district in the state of Assam, India. It is located on the banks of the Kaldia River. Nearby villages include Naligaon, Helochar Pam, Nalir Pam, Nalir Pathar, Kawaimari Block No 9, Kawaimari Block No 10, Pithadi Gaon and Pithadi Pam.

== Demographics ==
The Bhaktardoba comes under of Sarukhetri Assembly constituency (126), with a majority of inhabitants belonging to East Bengal-rooted Muslim. Hindu Assamese, Hindu Bengali are also inhabitant in Bhaktardoba.

== Heath (Hospital) ==
The Bhaktardoba Model Hospital that provides treatment to the people of Bhaktardoba as well as people from different parts of Barpeta district.

== Education ==
18+ Schools & 2 College are situated in Bhaktardoba.

Schools

1. Paschim Paka Azad Memorial High School
2. Paschim Paka Azad Memorial M.E Madrassa
3. Desh Bhakta M.E.School
4. Deshbhakta Girls High School
5. Naligaon H. Pre-Senior Madrassa
6. D Deshbhakta Pre-Senior Madrassa
7. N.K Girls High School
8. Pithadi High School
9. Red Rose Model School
10. Modern English School (Bhaktardaba)
11. Royal Academy
12. Azad Jatiya Vidyalaya
13. Excellent Academy (Bhaktardoba)
14. Global Academy
15. A.K Talent Academy (Bhaktardoba)
16. Nine Star Golden Academy
17. New Model Academy (DBS) Helocha
18. Modern English School (Bhaktardaba)

Colleges

1. Harendra Chitra Junior College, Bhaktardoba
2. Harendra Chitra College, Bhaktardoba

== Transport ==
The Kayakuchi Naligaon Road connects the Bhaktardoba Bazaar with district. Public transport buses and mini buses are available which connects the district and the city Guwahati.
