= Jakir Hussain Sikdar =

Indian politician

Member of the Assam Legislative Assembly for Sarukhetri
- Incumbent
- Assumed office July 2016
- Preceded by: Ali Hossain

Working President of Assam Pradesh Congress Committee
- Incumbent
- Assumed office July 2021

Personal details
- Party: Indian National Congress
- Profession: Politician

Jakir Hussain Sikdar is an Indian politician from Assam. He is a member of Indian National Congress. He is an MLA, elected from the Sarukhetri Assembly constituency in the 2016 Assam state assembly election. In the 2021 assembly election, he was re-elected from the same constituency.

== Early life and education ==
He was born in Kuriha village, Kayakuchi in Barpeta. He completed his schooling at Kayakuchi H.S. School in 1996. In 2000 he completed his Higher Secondary from Kayakuchi H.S. School. He completed his graduation from Nabajyoti College, Kalgachia in 2014.
