= Radhakuchi =

Radhakuchi is a village of Barpeta District, Assam, India.

== Location ==
Radhakuchi is located in Barpeta district in Assam, India. It is situated 11 km away from Barpeta, which is both the district & sub-district headquarters of Radhakuchi. Radhakuchi is also a gram panchayat. The name of Gaon Panchayat is 6 No. Radhakuchi Gaon Panchay in the local language, Assamese, in Barpeta district. Villages neighbouring Radhakuchi are Kharua Para (to the west), Panichilla (to the north), Radhakuchi Habi (to the East), and Barbila (to the south).

== Demographics ==
The area of the village is 273.28 hectares. Radhakuchi has a total population of 2,515 people in about 485 houses.

== Education ==
There is a lower primary school, a middle school, Chikar Bhitha M.E. School, and a high school, Radhakuchi ChikarBhitha (R.C.) High school. Republic Day, Independence Day, and other festivals are celebrated every year. Clubs like the Radhakuchi Amar Jyoti Club and Chikarbhitha Friends Club arrange many sports and cultural activities on these occasions.chikar bitha Biplop club and library.
