= Helochar Pam =

- Village
- Nickname: Helocha OR Helacha
- Location in Assam, India Helochar Pam (India)
- Coordinates: 26°38′33″N 91°12′35″E
- Country: India
- State: Assam
- Region: Lower Assam
- District: Barpeta

Government
  - Lok Sabha constituencies: Barpeta
  - Vidhan Sabha constituencies: Sarukhetri

Area
  - Total: 2.71 km^{2} (1.05 sq mi)

Population (2011)
  - Total: 2,409
  - Density: 889/km^{2} (2,300/sq mi)

Languages
  - Official: Assamese
  - Native: Barpetia Assamese
- Time zone: UTC+5:30 (IST)
- PIN: 781352
- Telephone code: +91 - (0) 3665
- ISO 3166 code: IN-AS
- Vehicle registration: AS-15 (Barpeta)

Helochar Pam (Assamese: হেলচাৰ পাম) or Helocha or Helacha is a village in Sarthebari Circle of Barpeta district in the state of Assam, India.

== Demographics ==
The Helochar Pam comes under of Sarukhetri Assembly constituency (126), with a majority of inhabitants being East Bengal-rooted Muslims.
