= Bhawanipur Anchalik College =

College in Assam

Coordinates: 26.4529°N 91.0573°E

- Type: Undergraduate college, Higher secondary
- Established: 1982
- Affiliations: Gauhati University
- President: Mr. Binode Chandra Pathak
- Principal: Dr. Mukuda Sarma
- Location: Bhawanipur, Barpeta district, Assam, India
- Website: bacollege.in

Bhawanipur Anchalik College is an undergraduate college established in the year 1982 at Bhawanipur of Barpeta district in Assam. The college is affiliated to Gauhati University.

== Accreditation ==
In 2015 the college was awarded "B" grade by National Assessment and Accreditation Council (NAAC). The college is also recognised by University Grants Commission (India).
