= Bohari =

- city
- Location in Assam, India Bohari (India)
- Coordinates: 26°15′17″N 91°08′17″E
- Country: India
- State: Assam
- District: Barpeta

Population (2001)
  - Total: 7,976

Languages
  - Official: Assamese
- Time zone: UTC+5:30 (IST)
- ISO 3166 code: IN-AS
- Vehicle registration: AS

Bohari is a census town in Barpeta district in the state of Assam, India.

== Demographics ==
As of 2001 India census, Bohari had a population of 7976. Males constitute 52% of the population and females 48%. Bohari has an average literacy rate of 59%, lower than the national average of 59.5%; with male literacy of 67% and female literacy of 51%. 13% of the population is under 6 years of age.
