= Barpeta Girls' College =

College in Assam

- Type: Undergraduate college
- Established: 1978
- Founder: Nibaran Choudhury
- Affiliations: Gauhati University
- President: Barindra Bhuyan
- Principal: Abdul Jabbar Ali Ahmed, I/C
- Location: Barpeta, Barpeta district, Assam, India
- Website: Official website

Barpeta Girls' College is an undergraduate college established in the year 1978 at Barpeta of Barpeta district in Assam. The college is affiliated to Gauhati University.

== Departments ==
- Assamese
- English
- Economics
- Education
- Philosophy
- Political Science
- Anthropology
- Home Science
- Commerce

== Accreditation ==
In 2016 the college has been awarded "B" grade by National Assessment and Accreditation Council. The college is also recognised by University Grants Commission (India).
