= Backward Regions Grant Fund =

Indian government program to address regional economic imbalances

The Backward Regions Grant Fund (BRGF) is an Indian government program designed to "address regional imbalances in development." The programme was launched by Indian Prime Minister Manmohan Singh at Barpeta, Assam on 19 February 2007.

The BRGF Programme covers 250 districts in 27 States, of which 232 districts fall under the purview of Parts IX and IX-A of the Constitution dealing with the Panchayats and the Municipalities, respectively. The remaining 18 districts are covered by other local government structures, such as Autonomous District and Regional Councils under the Sixth Schedule of the Constitution and state specific arrangements as in the case of Nagaland and the hill areas of Manipur.

The program calls for each district to undertake a study to determine the district's problems and then create a plan to address those problems. The program was funded with 19.25 billion rupees in 2006–2007.

== Objectives ==
The Backward Regions Grant Fund is designed to redress regional imbalances in development by way of providing financial resources for supplementing and converging existing developmental inflows into the identified backward districts, so as to:

- Bridge critical gaps in local infrastructure and other development requirements that are not being adequately met through existing inflows,
- Strengthen, to this end, Panchayat- and Municipality-level governance with more appropriate capacity building, to facilitate participatory planning, decision making, implementation and monitoring, to reflect local felt needs,
- Provide professional support to local bodies for planning, implementation and monitoring their plans,
- Improve the performance and delivery of critical functions assigned to Panchayats, and counter possible efficiency and equity losses on account of inadequate local capacity.

== BRGF Development Grants ==
District Plans received from the various States indicate that the untied fund allocated to the districts are generally being used for filling infrastructural gaps in drinking water, connectivity, health, education, social sectors, electrification, etc. The basket of works taken up includes construction of school buildings /class rooms, health sub-centres, drinking water facility, sanitation facilities, anganwadi buildings, Panchayat buildings, irrigation tanks/channels, street lights, link roads, culverts, soil and water conservation measures, etc.

== Grants ==
The BRGF has adopted the National Capability Building Framework (the NCBF) which envisages strengthening of institutional arrangements, including the infrastructure as well as software support for capacity building of elected representatives, the functionaries and other stakeholders of PRIs and thereby improving the vigour of grassroots level democracy. the utilization of grants should be used in democratic manner and no partisan politics would allowed in allocation of budget.
