= Anil Roychoudhury =

Assamese author, social scientist, freedom fighter, and intellectual

- অনিল ৰায়চৌধুৰী
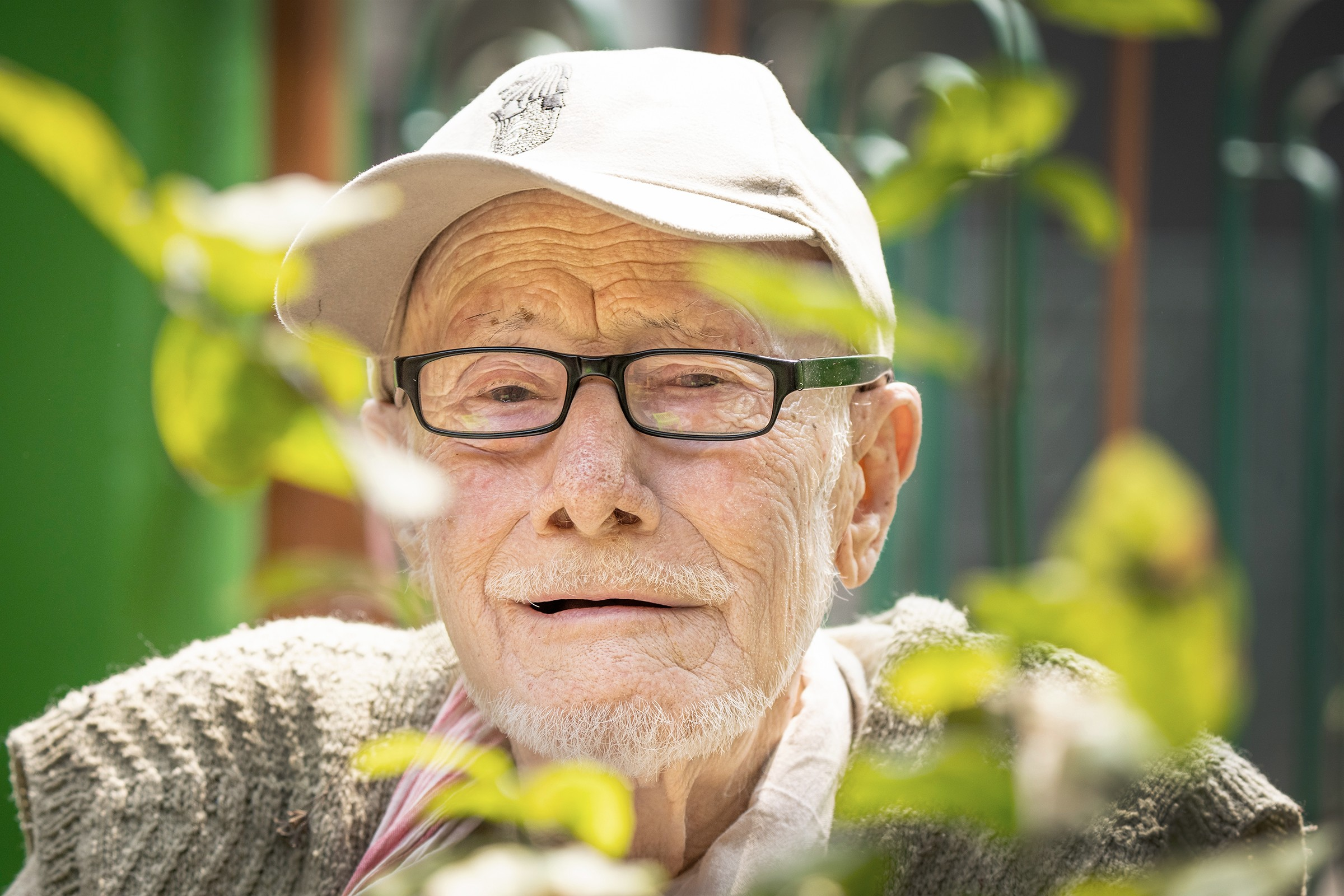
- Roychoudhury in 2020
- Born: 27 August 1926; Barpeta, Assam, British Empire
- Died: 1 May 2020 (aged 93); Guwahati, Assam, India
- Education: Guwahati University
- Occupations: Author, freedom fighter, social scientist
- Spouse: Bharati Roychoudhury
- Writing career
- Language: Assamese

Anil Roychoudhury (Assamese: অনিল ৰায়চৌধুৰী; 27 August 1926 - 1 May 2020) was an Assamese author, social scientist, freedom fighter and a progressive intellectual inspired by communist ideals.

== Life ==
Born in 1926 in Barpeta, Roychoudhury took part in the Indian Independence Movement during his school days. He was an accredited lyricist of the Akashvani Guwahati and wrote about 150 songs. After leaving behind eight jobs including Assam Secretariat, teaching, Central Excise Inspector etc., he was appointed as an employee of the administrative Department of Guwahati University in 1951. He played a key role in forming the Guwahati University Workers Union. He served jail terms for taking part in the trade union movement in 1962, 1965 and 1975. He retired in 1988 after serving for more than 37 years.

He was also associated with Asom Atmarakshi Fouj, Asam Sahitya Sabha, and Karup District Krishak Sabha. From 1971 he edited the Notun Prithiwi magazine. He was a founding member of Notun Sahitya Parishad. Later he became the secretary of the parishad and president in 1998. He died on 1 May 2020 at his residence in Guwahati. As per his wish, his body was donated to Gauhati Medical College and Hospital.
