= Poverty threshold =

Minimum income deemed adequate to live in a specific country or place

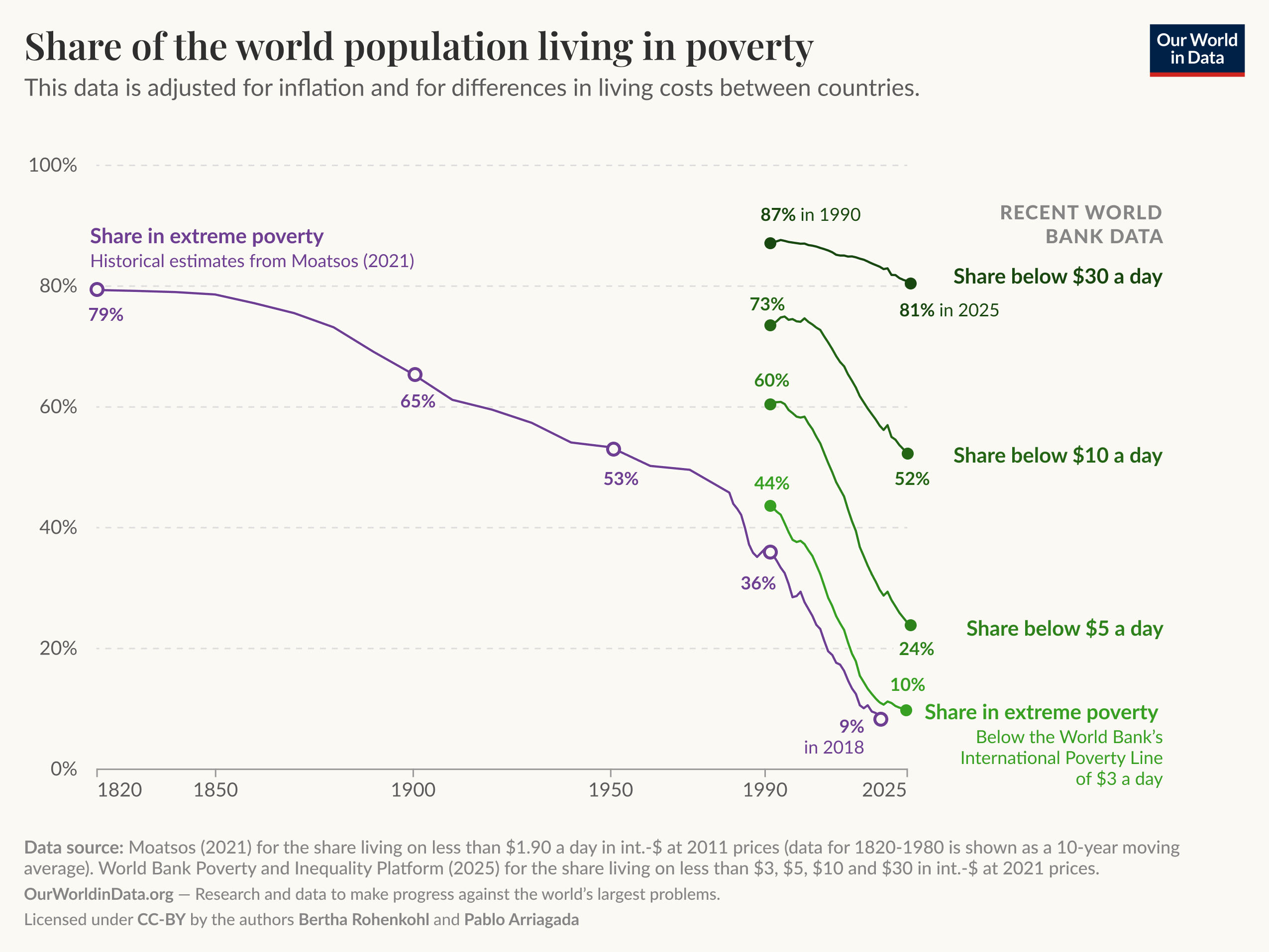
Share of the world population living on under 1.9, 3, 5, 10 and 30 equivalent of 2011 US dollars daily

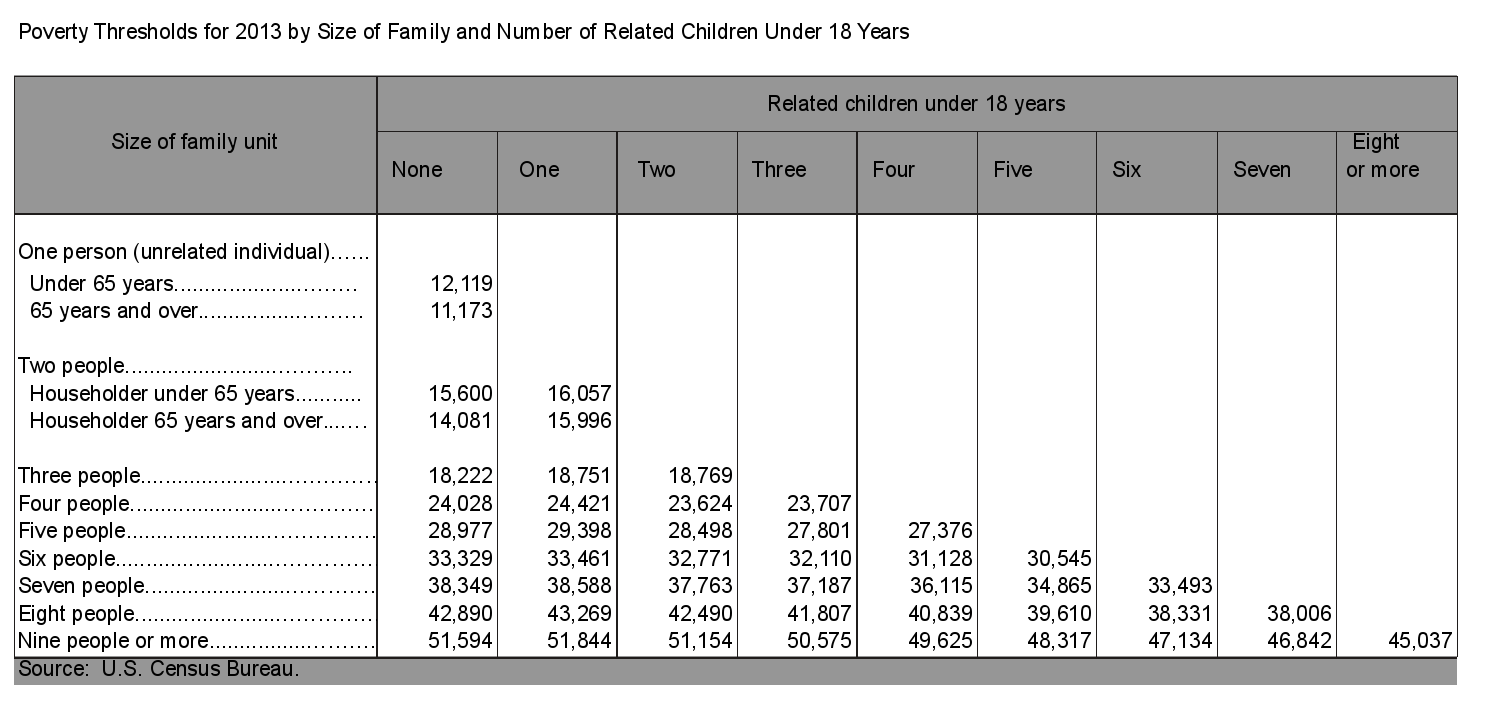
Poverty thresholds for 2013

The poverty threshold, poverty limit, poverty line, or breadline is the minimum level of income deemed adequate in a particular country. The poverty line is usually calculated by estimating the total cost of one year's worth of necessities for the average adult. The cost of housing, such as the rent for an apartment, usually makes up the largest proportion of this estimate, so economists track the real estate market and other housing cost indicators as a major influence on the poverty line. Individual factors are often used to account for various circumstances, such as whether one is a parent, elderly, a child, married, disabled, etc. The poverty threshold may be adjusted annually. In practice, like the definition of poverty, the official or common understanding of the poverty line is significantly higher in developed countries than in developing countries.

In June 2025, the World Bank updated the International Poverty Line (IPL) to $3.00 per person per day in low-income countries (in PPP). It also updated the poverty line for lower-middle income countries to $4.20 per day in PPP, and for upper-middle income countries to $8.30 per day in PPP. Based on the $3.00/person/day standard, the percentage of the global population living in poverty fell from 47.1% in 1981 to 10.3% by 2024, according to World Bank estimates; this equates to 839 million people living in poverty in 2024.

== History ==
Charles Booth, a pioneering investigator of poverty in London at the turn of the 20th century, popularised the idea of a poverty line, a concept originally conceived by the London School Board. Booth set the line at 10 (50p) to 20 shillings (£1) per week, which he considered to be the minimum amount necessary for a family of four or five people to subsist on. Seebohm Rowntree (1871–1954), a British sociological researcher, social reformer and industrialist, surveyed rich families in York, and drew a poverty line in terms of a minimum weekly sum of money "necessary to enable families … to secure the necessaries of a healthy life", which included fuel and light, rent, food, clothing, and household and personal items. Based on data from leading nutritionists of the period, he calculated the cheapest price for the minimum calorific intake and nutritional balance necessary, before people get ill or lose weight. He considered this amount to set his poverty line and concluded that 27.84% of the total population of York lived below this poverty line. This result corresponded with that from Booth's study of poverty in London and so challenged the view, commonly held at the time, that abject poverty was a problem particular to London and was not widespread in the rest of Britain. Rowntree distinguished between primary poverty, those lacking in income and secondary poverty, those who had enough income, but spent it elsewhere (1901:295–96).

The poverty threshold was first developed by Mollie Orshansky between 1963 and 1964. She attributed the poverty threshold as a measure of income inadequacy by taking the cost of food plan per family of three or four and multiplying it by a factor of three. In 1969 the inter agency poverty level review committee adjusted the threshold for only price changes.

== Absolute poverty and the International Poverty Line ==
The term "absolute poverty" is also sometimes used as a synonym for extreme poverty. Absolute poverty is the absence of enough resources to secure basic life necessities.

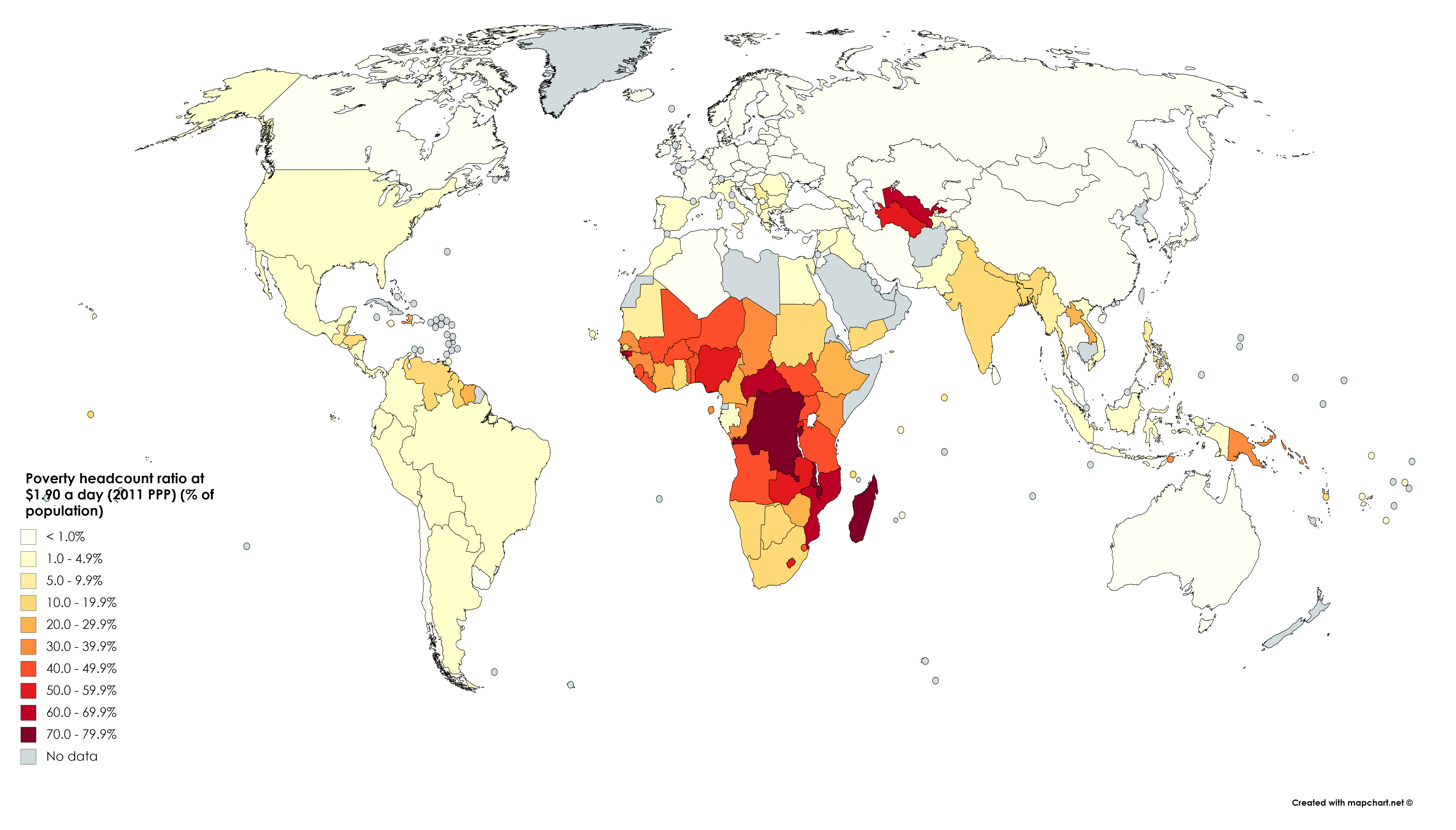
Poverty headcount ratio at $1.90 a day (2011 PPP) (% of population). Based on World Bank data ranging from 1998 to 2018.

To assist in measuring this, the World Bank has a daily per capita international poverty line (IPL), a global absolute minimum, of $3.00 a day as of June 2025. This new IPL replaces the previous $2.15 per person per day figure, based on 2017 PPP. The initial IPL was set by the World Bank at $1.00 per person per day in 1990.

These figures are artificially low according to Peter Edward of Newcastle University. He believes the real number as of 2015 was $7.40 per day.

Using a single monetary poverty threshold is problematic when applied worldwide, due to the difficulty of comparing prices between countries. Prices of the same goods vary dramatically from country to country; while this is typically corrected for by using PPP exchange rates, the basket of goods used to determine such rates is usually unrepresentative of the poor, most of whose expenditure is on basic foodstuffs rather than the relatively luxurious items (washing machines, air travel, healthcare) often included in PPP baskets. The economist Robert C. Allen has attempted to solve this by using standardized baskets of goods typical of those bought by the poor across countries and historical time, for example including a fixed calorific quantity of the cheapest local grain (such as corn, rice, or oats).

=== Basic needs ===
The basic needs approach is one of the major approaches to the measurement of absolute poverty in developing countries. It attempts to define the absolute minimum resources necessary for long-term physical well-being, usually in terms of consumption goods. The poverty line is then defined as the amount of income required to satisfy those needs. The 'basic needs' approach was introduced by the International Labour Organization's World Employment Conference in 1976. "Perhaps the high point of the WEP was the World Employment Conference of 1976, which proposed the satisfaction of basic human needs as the overriding objective of national and international development policy. The basic needs approach to development was endorsed by governments and workers' and employers' organizations from all over the world. It influenced the programs and policies of major multilateral and bilateral development agencies, and was the precursor to the human development approach."

A traditional list of immediate "basic needs" is food (including water), shelter, and clothing. Many modern lists emphasize the minimum level of consumption of 'basic needs' of not just food, water, and shelter, but also sanitation, education, and health care. Different agencies use different lists. According to a UN declaration that resulted from the World Summit on Social Development in Copenhagen in 1995, absolute poverty is "a condition characterized by severe deprivation of basic human needs, including food, safe drinking water, sanitation facilities, health, shelter, education, and information. It depends not only on income, but also on access to services."

David Gordon's paper, "Indicators of Poverty and Hunger", for the United Nations, further defines absolute poverty as the absence of any two of the following eight basic needs:

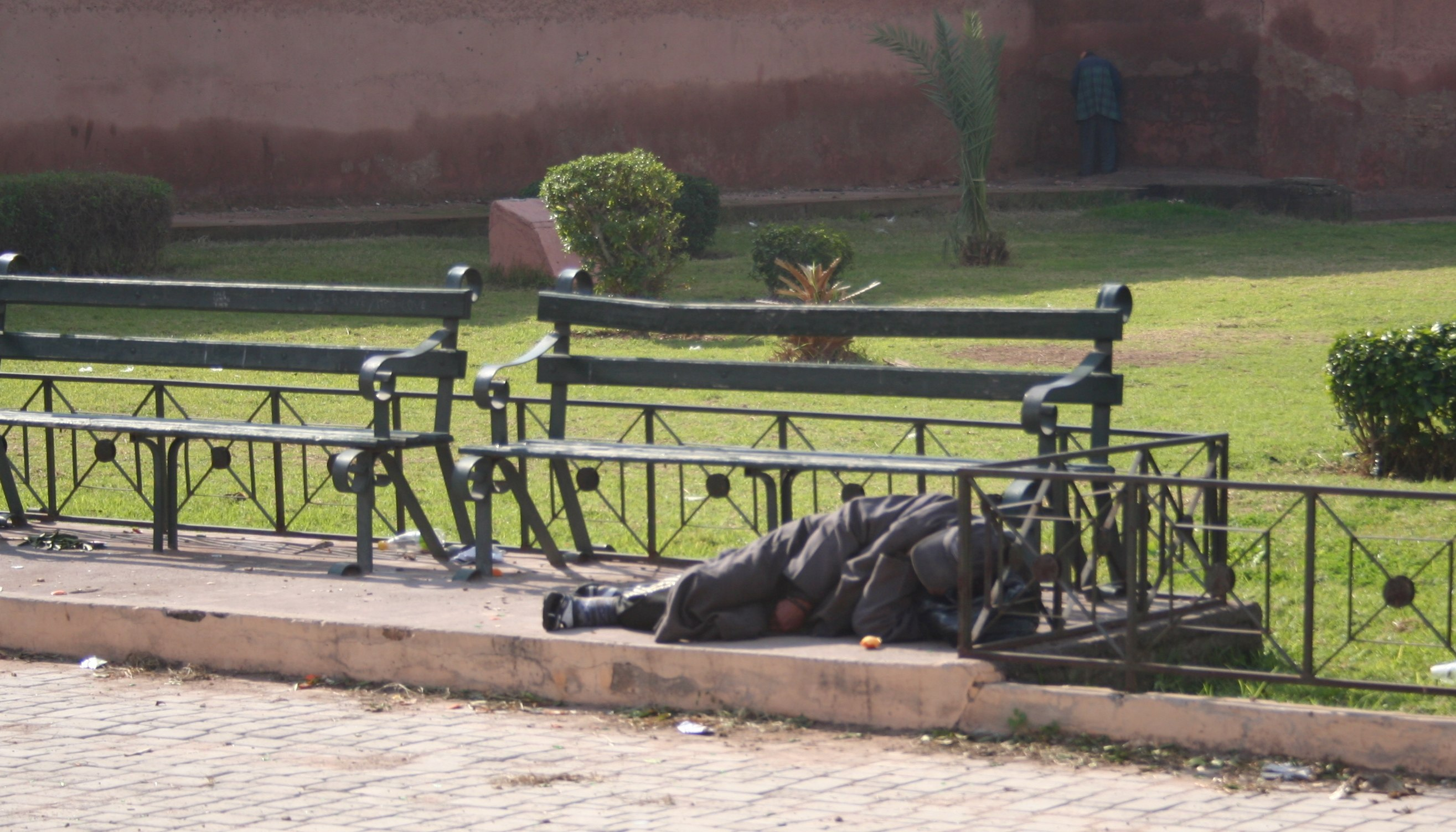
A homeless man seeks shelter under a public bench.

- Food: Body mass index must be above 16.
- Safe drinking water: Water must not come solely from rivers and ponds, and must be available nearby (fewer than 15 minutes' walk each way).
- Sanitation facilities: Toilets or latrines must be accessible in or near the home.
- Health: Treatment must be received for serious illnesses and pregnancy.
- Shelter: Homes must have fewer than four people living in each room. Floors must not be made of soil, mud, or clay.
- Education: Everyone must attend school or otherwise learn to read.
- Information: Everyone must have access to newspapers, radios, televisions, computers, or telephones at home.
- Access to services: This item is undefined by Gordon, but normally is used to indicate the complete panoply of education, health, legal, social, and financial (credit) services.

In 1978, Ghai investigated the literature that criticized the basic needs approach. Critics argued that the basic needs approach lacked scientific rigour; it was consumption-oriented and antigrowth. Some considered it to be "a recipe for perpetuating economic backwardness" and for giving the impression "that poverty elimination is all too easy". Amartya Sen focused on 'capabilities' rather than consumption.

In the development discourse, the basic needs model focuses on the measurement of what is believed to be an eradicable level of poverty.

== Relative poverty ==
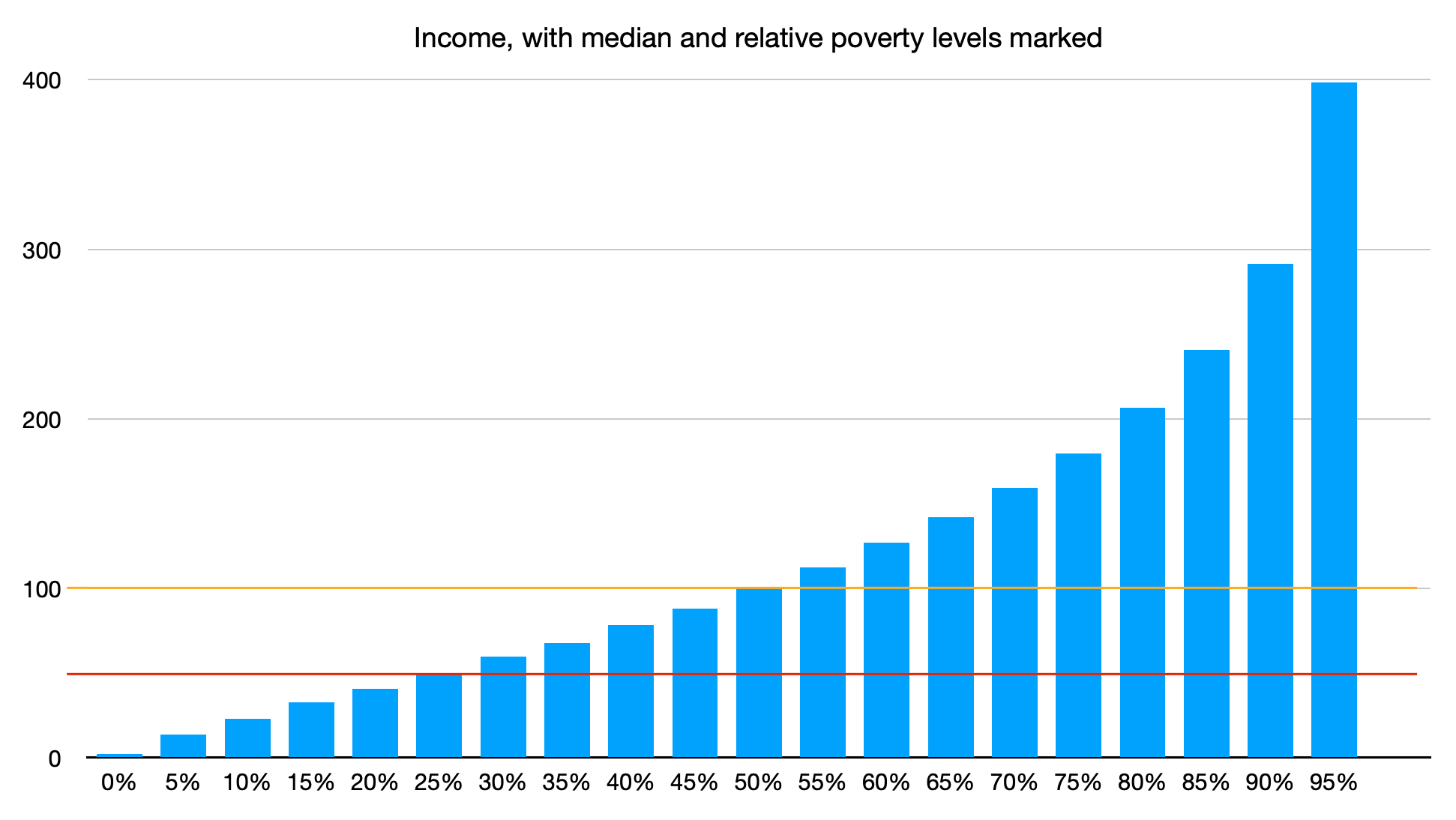
The blue bars represent the amount of money made by different people. The thin red line shows the relative poverty level. Anyone earning less than that, in this society, is relatively poor.

Relative poverty means low income relative to others in a country: for example, below 60% of the median income of people in that country.

Relative poverty measurements, unlike absolute poverty measurements, take the social economic environment of the people observed into consideration. It is based on the assumption that whether a person is considered poor depends on her/his income share relative to the income shares of other people who are living in the same economy. The threshold for relative poverty is considered to be at 50% of a country's median equivalised disposable income after social transfers. Thus, it can vary greatly from country to country even after adjusting for purchasing power standards (PPS).

A person can be poor in relative terms but not in absolute terms as the person might be able to meet her/his basic needs, but not be able to enjoy the same standards of living that other people in the same economy are enjoying. Relative poverty is thus a form of social exclusion that can for example affect peoples access to decent housing, education or job opportunities.

The relative poverty measure is used by the United Nations Development Program (UNDP), the United Nations Children's Fund (UNICEF), the Organisation for Economic Co-operation and Development (OECD) and Canadian poverty researchers. In the European Union, the "relative poverty measure is the most prominent and most–quoted of the EU social inclusion indicators."

"Relative poverty reflects better the cost of social inclusion and equality of opportunity in a specific time and space."

"Once economic development has progressed beyond a certain minimum level, the rub of the poverty problem – from the point of view of both the poor individual and of the societies in which they live – is not so much the effects of poverty in any absolute form but the effects of the contrast, daily perceived, between the lives of the poor and the lives of those around them. For practical purposes, the problem of poverty in the industrialized nations today is a problem of relative poverty (page 9)."

However, some have argued that as relative poverty is merely a measure of inequality, using the term 'poverty' for it is misleading. For example, if everyone in a country's income doubled, it would not reduce the amount of 'relative poverty' at all. A country suffering a broad-based recession or a famine would be recorded as seeing a decline in 'relative poverty'.

=== History of the concept of relative poverty ===
In 1776, Adam Smith argued that poverty is the inability to afford "not only the commodities which are indispensably necessary for the support of life, but whatever the custom of the country renders it indecent for creditable people, even of the lowest order, to be without."

In 1958, John Kenneth Galbraith argued, "People are poverty stricken when their income, even if adequate for survival, falls markedly behind that of their community."

In 1964, in a joint committee economic President's report in the United States, Republicans endorsed the concept of relative poverty: "No objective definition of poverty exists. ... The definition varies from place to place and time to time. In America as our standard of living rises, so does our idea of what is substandard."

In 1965, Rose Friedman argued for the use of relative poverty claiming that the definition of poverty changes with general living standards. Those labelled as poor in 1995, would have had "a higher standard of living than many labelled not poor" in 1965.

In 1967, American economist Victor Fuchs proposed that "we define as poor any family whose income is less than one-half the median family income." This was the first introduction of the relative poverty rate as typically computed today

In 1979, British sociologist, Peter Townsend published his famous definition: "individuals... can be said to be in poverty when they lack the resources to obtain the types of diet, participate in the activities and have the living conditions and amenities which are customary, or are at least widely encouraged or approved, in the societies to which they belong (page 31)."

Brian Nolan and Christopher T. Whelan of the Economic and Social Research Institute (ESRI) in Ireland explained that "poverty has to be seen in terms of the standard of living of the society in question."

Relative poverty measures are used as official poverty rates by the European Union, UNICEF and the OECD. The main poverty line used in the OECD and the European Union is based on "economic distance", a level of income set at 60% of the median household income.

=== Relative poverty compared with other standards ===
A measure of relative poverty defines "poverty" as being below some relative poverty threshold. For example, the statement that "those individuals who are employed and whose household equivalised disposable income is below 60% of national median equivalised income are poor" uses a relative measure to define poverty.

The term relative poverty can also be used in a different sense to mean "moderate poverty" – for example, a standard of living or level of income that is high enough to satisfy basic needs (like water, food, clothing, housing, and basic health care), but still significantly lower than that of the majority of the population under consideration. An example of this could be a person living in poor conditions or squalid housing in a high crime area of a developed country and struggling to pay their bills every month due to low wages, debt or unemployment. While this person still benefits from the infrastructure of the developed country, they still endure a less than ideal lifestyle compared to their more affluent countrymen or even the more affluent individuals in less developed countries who have lower living costs.

=== Living Income Concept ===
Living Income refers to the income needed to afford a decent standard of living in the place one lives. The distinguishing feature between a living income and the poverty line is the concept of decency, wherein people thrive, not only survive. Based on years of stakeholder dialogue and expert consultations, the Living Income Community of Practice, an open learning community, established the formal definition of living income drawing on the work of Richard and Martha Anker, who co-authored "Living Wages Around the World: Manual for Measurement". They define a living income as:

The net annual income required for a household in a particular place to afford a decent standard of living for all members of that household. Elements of a decent standard of living include food, water, housing, education, healthcare, transport, clothing, and other essential needs including provision for unexpected events.

Like the poverty line calculation, using a single global monetary calculation for Living Income is problematic when applied worldwide. Additionally, the Living Income should be adjusted quarterly due to inflation and other significant changes such as currency adjustments. The actual income or proxy income can be used when measuring the gap between initial income and the living income benchmarks. The World Bank notes that poverty and standard of living can be measured by social perception as well, and found that in 2015, roughly one-third of the world's population was considered poor in relation to their particular society.

The Living Income Community of Practice (LICOP) was founded by The Sustainable Food Lab, GIZ and ISEAL Alliance to measure the gap between what people around the world earn versus what they need to have a decent standard of living, and find ways to bridge this gap.

A variation on the LICOP's Living Income is the Massachusetts Institute of Technology's Living Wage Calculator, which compares the local minimum wage to the amount of money needed to cover expenses beyond what is needed to merely survive across the United States. The cost of living varies greatly if there are children or other dependents in the household.

== Relevance ==
An outdated or flawed poverty measure is an obstacle for policymakers, researchers and academics trying to find solutions to the problem of poverty. This has implications for people. The federal poverty line is used by dozens of federal, state, and local agencies, as well as several private organizations and charities, to decide who needs assistance. The assistance can take many forms, but it is often difficult to put in place any type of aid without measurements which provide data. In a rapidly evolving economic climate, poverty assessment often aids developed countries in determining the efficacy of their programs and guiding their development strategy. In addition, by measuring poverty one receives knowledge of which poverty reduction strategies work and which do not, helping to evaluate different projects, policies and institutions. To a large extent, measuring the poor and having strategies to do so keep the poor on the agenda, making the problem of political and moral concern.

== Threshold limitations ==
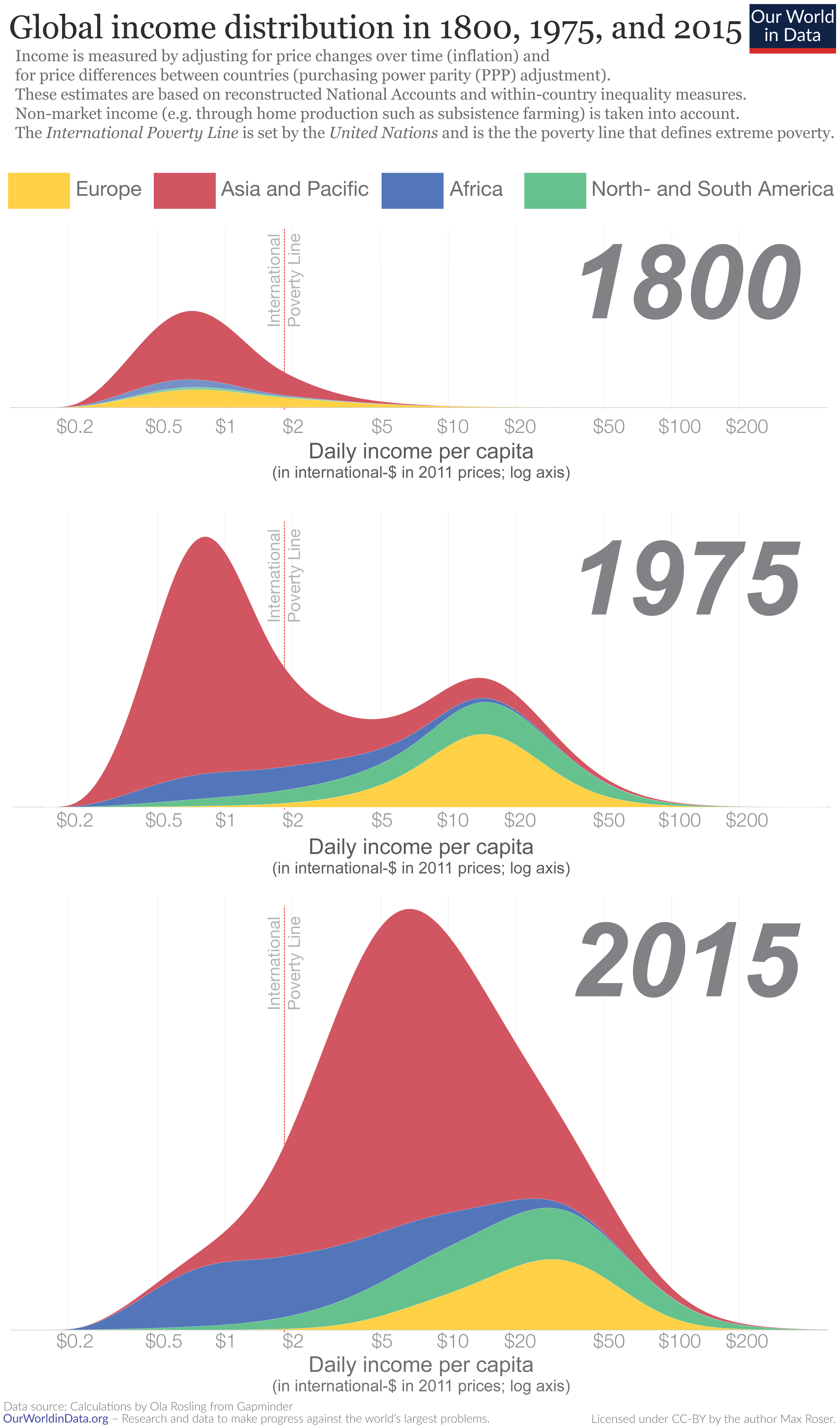
Global income distribution over time (Our World in Data). The chart shows a significant shift of incomes toward higher levels.

It is hard to have exact number for poverty, as much data is collected through interviews, meaning income that is reported to the interviewer must be taken at face value. As a result, data could not rightly represent the situations true nature, nor fully represent the income earned illegally. In addition, if the data were correct and accurate, it would still not mean serving as an adequate measure of the living standards, the well-being or economic position of a given family or household. Research done by Haughton and Khandker finds that there is no ideal measure of well-being, arguing that all measures of poverty are imperfect. That is not to say that measuring poverty should be avoided; rather, all indicators of poverty should be approached with caution, and questions about how they are formulated should be raised.

As a result, depending on the indicator of economic status used, an estimate of who is disadvantaged, which groups have the highest poverty rates, and the nation's progress against poverty varies significantly. Hence, this can mean that defining poverty is not just a matter of measuring things accurately, but it also necessitates fundamental social judgments, many of which have moral implications.

== National poverty lines ==
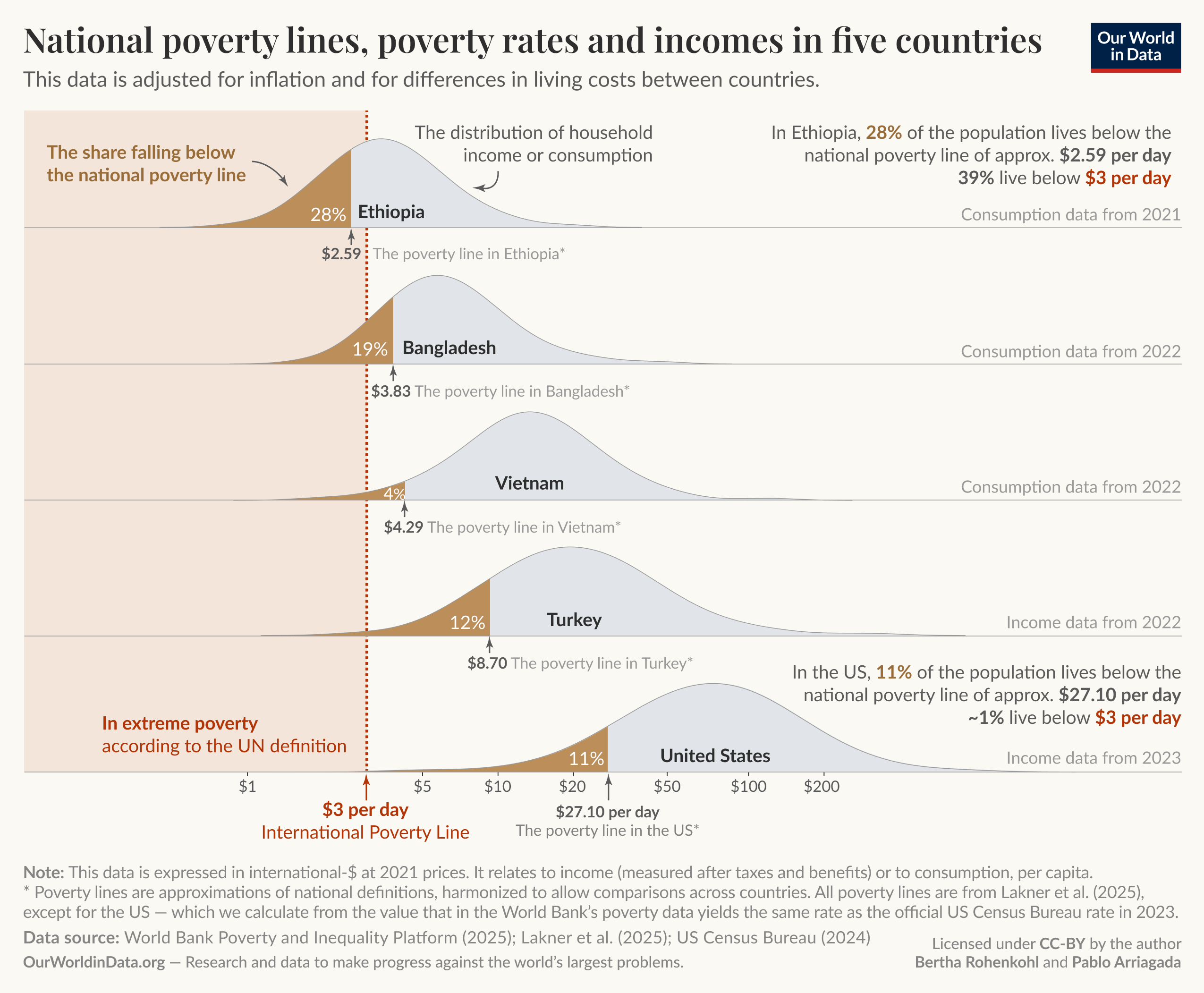
National poverty lines vary widely between countries.

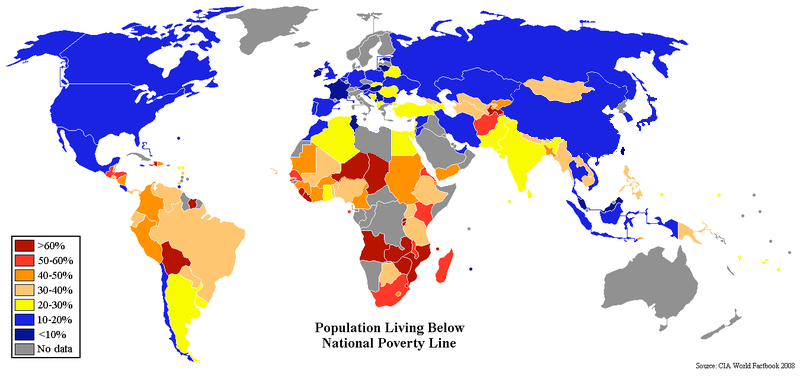
2008 CIA World Factbook-based map showing the percentage of population by country living below that country's official poverty line

National estimates are based on population-weighted subgroup estimates from household surveys. Definitions of the poverty line do vary considerably among nations. For example, rich nations generally employ more generous standards of poverty than poor nations. Even among rich nations, the standards differ greatly. Thus, the numbers are not comparable among countries. Even when nations do use the same method, some issues may remain.

=== Poland ===
According to Statistics Poland, the proportion of the population living below the national extreme poverty (minimum subsistence) threshold was 4.2% as of 2019. This is approximately 22% or 1.2 percentage points lower than the previous year. In the fourth quarter of 2019, for single-person households, this threshold was set at 614 zł per month (~20.17 zł per day, equivalent to ~€4.71 or ~$5.21 per day at the time).

=== United Kingdom ===
In the UK in 2006, "more than five million people – over a fifth (23 percent) of all employees – were paid less than £6.67 an hour". This value is based on a low pay rate of 60 percent of full-time median earnings, equivalent to a little over £12,000 a year for a 35-hour working week. In April 2006, a 35-hour week would have earned someone £9,191 a year – before tax or National Insurance".

In 2019, the Low Pay Commission estimated that about 7% of people employed in the UK were earning at or below the National Minimum Wage. In 2021, the Office for National Statistics found that 3.8% of jobs were paid below the National Minimum Wage, a decrease from 7.4% in 2020 but an increase from 1.4% in 2019. They note that this increase from 2019 to 2021 is connected to the COVID-19 pandemic in the United Kingdom. The Guardian reported in 2021 that "almost 5m jobs, or one in six nationally, pay below the real living wage".

=== India ===
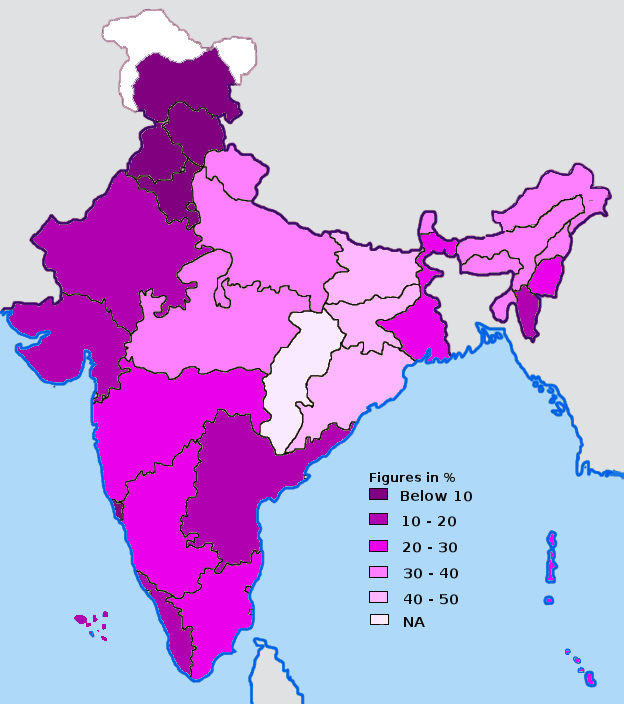
Poverty rate map of India by prevalence in 2000, among its states and union territories

India's official poverty level as of 2005 is split according to rural versus urban thresholds. For urban dwellers, the poverty line is defined as living on less than 538.60 rupees (approximately US$12) per month, whereas for rural dwellers, it is defined as living on less than 356.35 rupees per month (approximately US$7.50) In 2019, the Indian government stated that 6.7% of its population is below its official poverty limit. As India is one of the fastest-growing economies in 2018, poverty is on the decline in the country, with close to 44 Indians escaping extreme poverty every minute, as per the World Poverty Clock. India lifted 271 million people out of poverty in a 10-year time period from 2005/06 to 2015/16.

=== Iran ===
In 2008 Iran government report by central statistics had recommended 9.5 around million people living below poverty line. As of August 2022 the Iranian economy suffered the highest inflation in 75 years; official statistics put the poverty line at 10 million tomans ($500), while the minimum wage given in the same year has been 5 million toman.

=== Singapore ===
Singapore has experienced strong economic growth over the last ten years and has consistently ranked among the world's top countries in terms of GDP per capita.

Inequality has however increased dramatically over the same time span, yet there is no official poverty line in the country. Given Singapore's high level of growth and prosperity, many believe that poverty does not exist in the country, or that domestic poverty is not comparable to global absolute poverty. Such a view persists for a selection of reasons, and since there is no official poverty line, there is no strong acknowledgement that it exists.

Yet, Singapore is not considering establishing an official poverty line, with Minister for Social and Family Development Chan Chun Sing claiming it would fail to represent the magnitude and scope of problems faced by the poor. As a result, social benefits and aids aimed at the poor would be a missed opportunity for those living right above such a line.

=== United States ===
In the United States, the poverty thresholds are updated every year by the Census Bureau. The threshold in the United States is updated and used for statistical purposes. The poverty guidelines are also used as an eligibility criterion by Medicaid and a number of other Federal programs.

In 2025, the weighted-average poverty threshold for a family of four was $32,970. The official poverty rate was 10.2 percent, representing 34.5 million people. Other estimates place the percentage of people living in poverty as low as only 1.1% in 2017.

==== Women and children ====
Women and children find themselves impacted by poverty more often when a part of single mother families. The poverty rate of women has increasingly exceeded that of men's. While the overall poverty rate is 12.3%, women poverty rate is 13.8% which is above the average and men are below the overall rate at 11.1%. Women and children (as single mother families) find themselves as a part of low class communities because they are 21.6% more likely to fall into poverty. However, extreme poverty, such as homelessness, disproportionately affects males to a high degree.

==== Racial minorities ====
A minority group is defined as "a category of people who experience relative disadvantage as compared to members of a dominant social group." Minorities are traditionally separated into the following groups: African Americans, American Indians, Alaska Natives, Asians, Pacific Islanders, and Hispanics. According to US Poverty statistics, Black Americans – 21%, Foreign born non-citizens – 19%, Hispanic Americans – 18%, and adults with a disability – 25%. This does not include all minority groups, but these groups alone account for 85% of people under the poverty line in the United States. White Americans have a poverty rate of 8.7%; the poverty rate is more than double for Black and Hispanic Americans.

==== Impacts on education ====
Living below the poverty threshold can have a major impact on a child's education. The psychological stresses induced by poverty may affect a student's ability to perform well academically. In addition, the risk of poor health is more prevalent for those living in poverty. Health issues commonly affect the extent to which one can continue and fully take advantage of their education. Poor students in the United States are more likely to dropout of school at some point in their education. Research has also found that children living in poverty perform poorly academically and have lower graduation rates. Impoverished children also experience more disciplinary issues in school than others.

Schools in impoverished communities usually do not receive much funding, which can also set their students apart from those living in more affluent neighborhoods. There is much dispute over whether upward mobility that brings a child out of poverty may or may not have a significant positive impact on their education; inadequate academic habits that form as early as preschool typically are unknown to improve despite changes in socioeconomic status.

==== Impacts on healthcare ====
The nation's poverty threshold is issued by the Census Bureau. According to the Office of Assistant Secretary for Planning and Evaluation the threshold is statistically relevant and can be a solid predictor of people in poverty. The reasoning for using Federal Poverty Level (FPL) is due to its action for distributive purposes under the direction of Health and Human Services. So FPL is a tool derived from the threshold but can be used to show eligibility for certain federal programs. Federal poverty levels have direct effects on individuals' healthcare. In the past years and into the present government, the use of the poverty threshold has consequences for such programs like Medicaid and the Children's Health Insurance Program. The benefits which different families are eligible for are contingent on FPL. The FPL, in turn, is calculated based on federal numbers from the previous year.

The benefits and qualifications for federal programs are dependent on number of people on a plan and the income of the total group. For 2019, the U.S. Department of Health & Human Services enumerate what the line is for different families. For a single person, the line is $12,490 and up to $43,430 for a family of 8, in the lower 48 states. Another issue is reduced-cost coverage. These reductions are based on income relative to FPL, and work in connection with public health services such as Medicaid. The divisions of FPL percentages are nominally, above 400%, below 138% and below 100% of the FPL. After the advent of the American Care Act, Medicaid was expanded on states bases. For example, enrolling in the ACA kept the benefits of Medicaid when the income was up to 138% of the FPL.

==== Poverty mobility and healthcare ====
Health Affairs along with analysis by Georgetown found that public assistance does counteract poverty threats between 2010 and 2015. In regards to Medicaid, child poverty is decreased by 5.3%, and Hispanic and Black poverty by 6.1% and 4.9% respectively. The reduction of family poverty also has the highest decrease with Medicaid over other public assistance programs. Expanding state Medicaid decreased the amount individuals paid by an average of $42, while it increased the costs to $326 for people not in expanded states. The same study analyzed showed 2.6 million people were kept out of poverty by the effects of Medicaid. From a 2013–2015 study, expansion states showed a smaller gap in health insurance between households making below $25,000 and above $75,000. Expansion also significantly reduced the gap of having a primary care physician between impoverished and higher income individuals. In terms of education level and employment, health insurance differences were also reduced. Non-expansion also showed poor residents went from a 22% chance of being uninsured to 66% from 2013 to 2015.

==== Poverty dynamics ====
Living above or below the poverty threshold is not necessarily a position in which an individual remains static. As many as one in three impoverished people were not poor at birth; rather, they descended into poverty over the course of their life. Additionally, a study which analyzed data from the Panel Study of Income Dynamics (PSID) found that nearly 40% of 20-year-olds received food stamps at some point before they turned 65. This indicates that many Americans will dip below the poverty line sometime during adulthood, but will not necessarily remain there for the rest of their life. Furthermore, 44% of individuals who are given transfer benefits (other than Social Security) in one year do not receive them the next. Over 90% of Americans who receive transfers from the government stop receiving them within 10 years, indicating that the population living below the poverty threshold is in flux and does not remain constant.

==== Cutoff issues ====
Many experts have said that the official poverty line in the United States is substantially lower than the actual cost of basic needs. In particular, a 2017 Urban Institute study found that 61% of non-elderly adults earning between 100 and 200% of the poverty line reported at least one material hardship, not significantly different from those below the poverty line. The cause of the discrepancy is believed to be an outdated model of spending patterns based on actual spending in the year 1955; the number and proportion of material needs has risen substantially since then.

===== Variability =====
The US Census Bureau calculates the poverty line the same throughout the US regardless of the cost-of-living in a state or urban area. For instance, the cost-of-living in California, the most populous state, was 42% greater than the US average in 2010, while the cost-of-living in Texas, the second-most populous state, was 10% less than the US average. In 2017, California had the highest poverty rate in the country when housing costs are factored in, a measure calculated by the Census Bureau known as "the supplemental poverty measure".

==== Government transfers to alleviate poverty ====
In addition to wage and salary income, investment income and government transfers such as SNAP (Supplemental Nutrition Assistance Program, also known as food stamps) and housing subsidies are included in a household's income. Studies measuring the differences between income before and after taxes and government transfers, have found that without social support programs, poverty would be roughly 30% to 40% higher than the official poverty line indicates.

== See also ==
- Asset poverty
- Guaranteed minimum income
- Income deficit
- List of countries by percentage of population living in poverty
- Living wage
- Measuring poverty
- Poor person
- Millennium Development Goals
- Social safety net
- Sustainable Development Goal 1
