= Chapar Bori =

Chapar Bori Chapar Bari
- village
- Location in Assam, India Chapar Bori (India)
- Coordinates: 26°27′08.2″N 91°06′43.5″E
- Country: India
- State: Assam
- District: Barpeta
- Founder: Iliyas Hussain

Area
  - Total: 9 km^{2} (3.5 sq mi)

Population (2011)
  - Total: 1,802
  - Density: 200/km^{2} (520/sq mi)

Languages
  - Official: Assamese
- Time zone: UTC+5:30 (IST)
- Postal code: 781352
- Telephone code: 913666
- Vehicle registration: AS

Chapar Bori or Chapar Bari is a village located in Barpeta district in the state of Assam, India.

Chapar Bori Market

Ha do do competition under 12, Chapar Bori

== Etymology ==
The origin of the name may be based on the Assamese words for "clean" and "old woman" (Chapa Bori) (Assamese:ছাফা বুড়ী). The name Chapa Bori became Chapar Bori (Assamese:ছাপাৰ বড়ী) with time.

== Geography ==
Chapar Bori is located in Barpeta district, and is 100 km northwest of Guwahati, the capital of Assam, at coordinates 26° 27'08.2"N, 91°06'43.5" E. According to Census the village has a total area of 9 square miles (approximately 23.5 km2).

== Demographics ==
As of 2011 India census the village had a population of 1,802. Males constitute 51% of the population and females 49%. 19% of the population is under 6 years of age. 100% of the population are ethnic Assamese people and they speak Assamese and Bangla.

== Education ==
Chapar Bori High School is situated in Chapar Bori. There are several other institutions also in the area: some of them are Ashrafulum Sm School, Iliyas Hussain Academy, Chapar Bori ME Madrassa, Nine Star Modern Academy, and Chapar Bori Prak Prathomik vidyalaya.

== Transport facilities ==
There are three bus services that run through Chapar Bori to Guwahati, and three more that run to Barpeta Road. There are many small vehicles that run to Rajakhat (a connecting point of National Highway 37).
