= Banikanta Kakati =

Indian linguist and writer

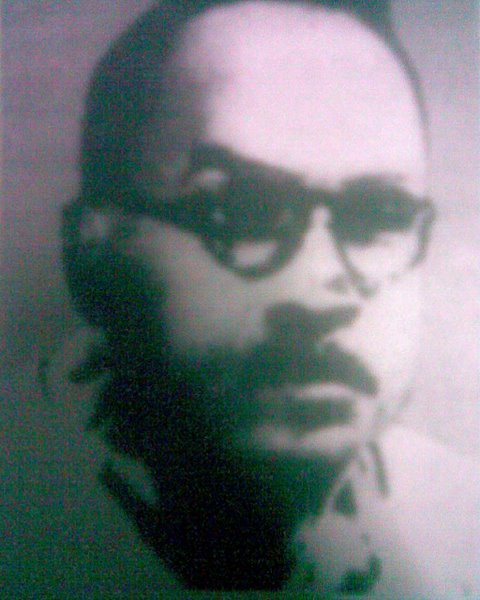
- Born: 15 November 1894; Barpeta, Assam
- Died: 15 November 1952 (aged 58)
- Education: Cotton University; Presidency University; Calcutta University
- Occupations: Writer, Lecturer
- Writing career
- Language: Assamese

Banikanta Kakati (15 November 1894 — 15 November 1952) was a prominent linguist, literary figure, critic and scholar in Assamese language with his immense contribution to the language in terms of literature, linguistics, cultural anthropology and comparative religion.

== Biography ==
Banikanta Kakati was born in 1894 at Barpeta of Assam. He was the second son of his parents Lalitram Kakati and Lahobala. Kakati showed sign of his genius from his early childhood. In his school days he obtained 105 marks out of 100 in his Sanskrit answer book. It is also said that he could memorise the whole of Pāṇini in his school days.

Kakati secured the highest position in English in Assam in his matriculation under the Calcutta University. 1913, he stood first among all the candidates in the intermediate from Cotton College, Guwahati under the Calcutta University. He took first M.A. degree in English Literature from Presidency College, Calcutta in 1918. Later on he secured the first class first position in M.A. in English Language group in 1923 from Calcutta University. Kakati's doctoral research titled Assamese: Its Formation and Development was carried out at Calcutta University under the supervision of Suniti Kumar Chatterji.

Kakati joined Cotton College in 1918 as a professor of English until he became the principal of the college in 1947. He joined in Gauhati University in 1948 as the Dean of the Faculty of Arts and Head of the Department of Assamese.

Kakati's health broke after the demise of his beloved wife Kanaklata in 1952 and died in the same year, on 15 November, the date of his birth.

== Literary career ==
Soon after joining Cotton College as a lecturer in 1918, Banikanta Kakati took up the study of Srimanta Sankardeva and old Assamese literature. Soon, he was drawn into a controversy between two rival schools of Assam Vaishnavism. His erudite exposition of scriptural lore in the various issues of the Banhi under the pseudonym of Babananda Pathak, in defence of the values represented by the teachings of Sankardeva still makes fruitful reading.

While studying MA examination in English, he obtained his doctorate for his thesis – Assamese : Its Formation and Development in 1935. The publication of the thesis in 1941 was a god-send for the Assamese people who had been frantically struggling to establish the identity and provenance of their mother tongue. Kakati had to work far from the great centres of learning, in a place where even Leonard Bloomfields’ Language (1833) could not be made available. Yet the work was acclaimed by no lesser an authority than Dr Emeneau who found it ‘ground-breaking in many ways.’

His interest in language proliferated over the years, but meanwhile, his mind started straying into other fields and pastures new. He made an intensive study of the Kalita caste and incorporated his findings in Kalita Jatir Itibritta (1941), Mother Goddess Kamakhya (1948) deals with socio-religious issues prevalent in Ancient Kamarupa. Finally he turned his attention to Indian mythology and his Vaishnavite Myths and Legends has been acclaimed as 'one of the very few studies of the religious scene in India, produced by our scholars, that deserve reading and pondering over.'

Dr Kakati was one of the greatest critics that the country has produced. His Purani Asomiya Sahitya provides the axes for the appreciation of Vaishnavite literature of medieval Assam. He was certainly the most capable interpreter of religious mysticism in the poetry of the Nam Ghosha. He also raised the perennial issue of a possible tension between poetry and belief.

Himself a scion of the Romantic age, Kakati sketched the critical background for the twentieth century Assamese romantics. The post-war decade in Assam is a decade of disenchantment. In this decade he also wrote on the contemporary situation which seemed to show that a great age was over and another was yet to be born. He died too early to see the achievements of the ensuing age.

== Books ==
Banikanta Kakati's writings both in English and Assamese mark a distinct achievement in the history of Assamese scholarship. As a critic of old and new literature in Assamese and as a writer on sociology and religious trends in medieval India-particularly Assam, he set new standards.

In English:

1. Assamese: Its formation and Development
2. Mother Goddess Kamakhya
3. Life and Teachings of Sankardeva
4. Vaishnavite Myths and legends

In Assamese:

1. Purani Kamrupar Dharmar Dhara
2. Purani Asamiya Sahitya
3. Kalita Jaatir Itibritta
4. Sahitya Aru Prem
5. Pakhila
