= Ali Hossain (politician) =

Indian politician

MLA of Sarukhetri Vidhan Sabha Constituency
- In office 2011–2016
- Preceded by: Tara Prasad Das
- Succeeded by: Jakir Hussain Sikdar

Personal details
- Party: All India United Democratic Front

Ali Hossain is an Indian politician. In 2011, he was elected as an MLA from the Sarukhetri Vidhan Sabha Constituency to the Assam Legislative Assembly. He is an All India United Democratic Front politician.
