= Sarukhetri Assembly constituency =

Constituency of the Assam legislative assembly in India

Coordinates: 26.36°N 91.22°E

Sarukhetri
- Former constituency No. 46 for the Assam Legislative Assembly

Constituency details
- Country: India
- Region: Northeast India
- State: Assam
- District: Barpeta
- Lok Sabha constituency: Barpeta
- Established: 1967
- Abolished: 2023
- Reservation: None

Sarukhetri Assembly constituency was one of the 126 assembly constituencies of Assam Legislative Assembly. Sarukhetri formed part of the Barpeta Lok Sabha constituency. This constituency was abolished in 2023.

== Members of Legislative Assembly ==
- 1967: M. Nayak, Independent
- 1972: Kandarpa Kumar Das, Indian National Congress
- 1978: Sirajul Haque, Independent
- 1983: Amir Hamcha Talukdar, Indian National Congress
- 1985: Dinabandhu Choudhary, Independent
- 1991: Nizamuddin Khan, Communist Party of India (Marxist)
- 1996: Nizamuddin Khan, Communist Party of India (Marxist)
- 2001: Dr. Tara Prasad Das, Independent
- 2006: Dr. Tara Prasad Das, Independent
- 2011: Ali Hossain, All India United Democratic Front
- 2016: Jakir Hussain Sikdar, Indian National Congress
- 2021: Jakir Hussain Sikdar, Indian National Congress

== Election results ==
=== 2016 ===
2021 Assam Legislative Assembly election: Sarukhetri
Party	Candidate	Votes	%	±%
INC	Jakir Hussain Sikdar	77,045	43.07	N/A
AGP	Kalpana Patowary	47,504	26.55	N/A
AIUDF	Minakshi Rahman	44,805	25.04	N/A
AJP	Manik Chandra Baro	3,093	1.72	N/A
NOTA	None of the above	1,265	0.70	N/A
Majority		29,541	16.52	
Turnout		1,78,880	86.67	
Registered electors		2,06,383		
INC gain from AGP		Swing		

=== 2016 ===
2016 Assam Legislative Assembly election: Sarukhetri
Party	Candidate	Votes	%	±%
INC	Jakir Hussain Sikdar	70062		
AGP	Chittaranjan Barman	45,815		
AIUDF	Ali Hossain	21,460		
Independent	Tara Prasad Das	9,623		
CPI(M)	Pearul Islam Ahmed	3,626		
Independent	Hareswar Deka	1,308		
TNRMPI	Matiar Rahman	836		
BGP	Hemanta Kalita	523		
RJP	Md. Anowar Islam Akand	516		
RPI	Jabidur Rahman Khan	505		
NCP	Arun Das	442		
NOTA	None of the above	776		
Majority		24,247		
Turnout		1,55,492		
Registered electors		1,75,014		
INC gain from AIUDF		Swing		
