= World Poverty Clock =

Tool to monitor progress against poverty globally

The World Poverty Clock is a tool to monitor progress against poverty globally, and regionally. It provides real-time poverty data across countries. Created by the Vienna-based NGO, World Data Lab, it was launched in Berlin at the re:publica conference in 2017, and is funded by Germany's Federal Ministry for Economic Cooperation and Development.

The clock seeks to address a gap in development data around social progress indicators, starting with poverty numbers, and tries to align them with economic and demographic indicators like Gross Domestic Product (GDP), and population clocks and forecast respectively, which already have real-time and forward looking estimates.

== Methodology ==
The World Poverty Clock uses publicly available data on income distribution, stratification, production, and consumption, provided by different and multiple international organizations, most notably the UN, WorldBank, and the International Monetary Fund. These organizations compile data provided to them by governments in each country. In a few cases, governments fail to provide data. The World Poverty Clock uses models to estimate poverty in these countries, covering 99.7% of the world’s population. It also models how individual incomes might change over time, using IMF growth forecasts for the medium-term complemented by long-term “shared socio-economic pathways” developed by the Institute of International Applied Systems Analysis near Vienna, Austria, and similar analysis developed by the OECD.
