= Barpeta district =

Barpeta District
- District
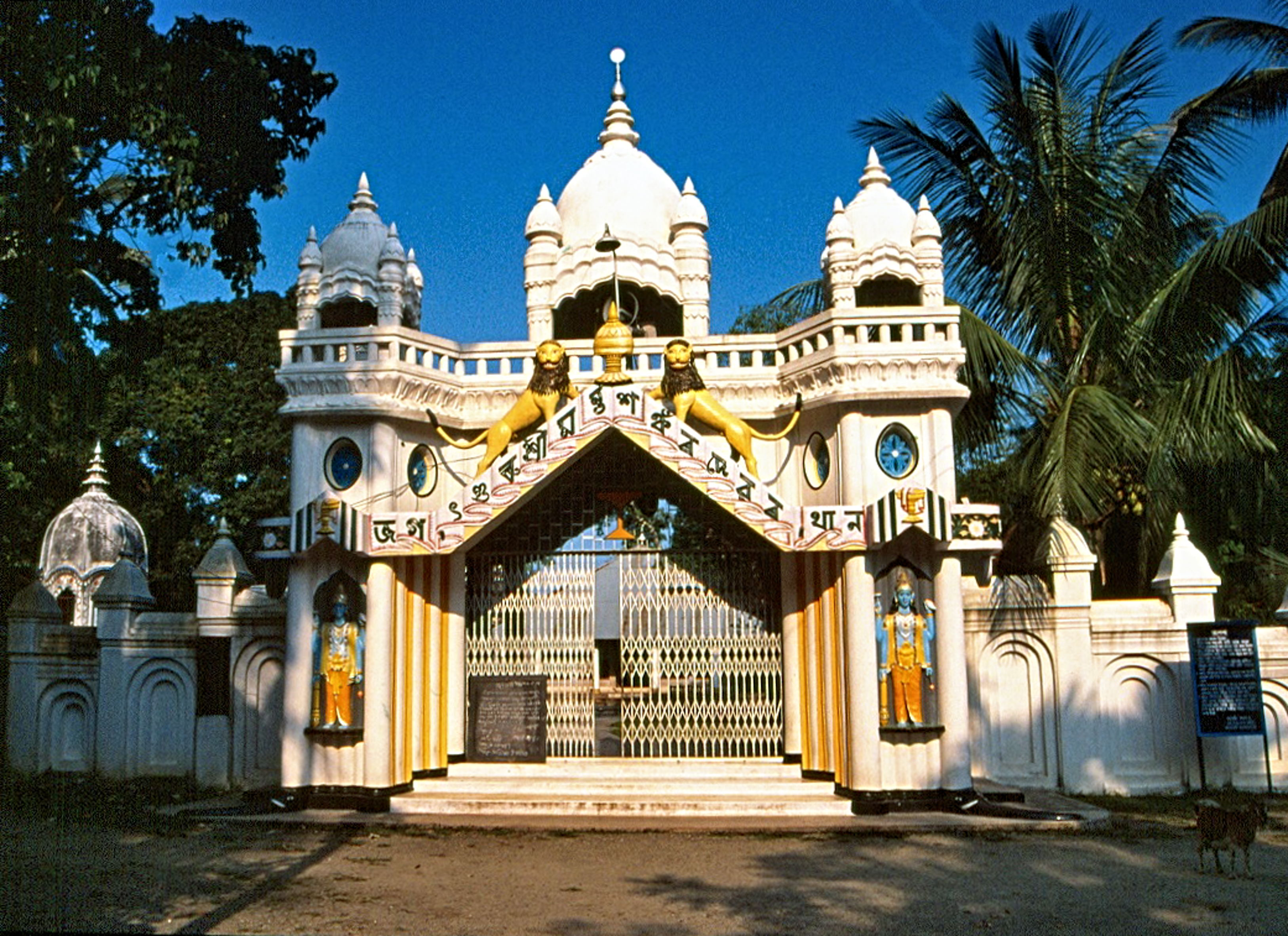
- Patbaushi Satra, Barpeta

- Location in Assam
- Coordinates: 26°32′N 91°00′E
- Country: India
- State: Assam
- Division: Lower Assam
- Established: 1983
- Headquarters: Barpeta

Government
  - Lok Sabha constituencies: Barpeta
  - Vidhan Sabha constituencies: Sorbhog, Barpeta, Jania, Baghbar, Sarukhetri, Chenga
  - District Commissioner: Shri Nabadeep Pathak, ACS
  - Senior Superintendent of Police: Shri Sushanta Biswa Sarma, APS

Area
  - Total: 2,243.96 km^{2} (866.40 sq mi)

Population (2011)
  - Total: 1,439,806
  - Density: 641.636/km^{2} (1,661.83/sq mi)
- Time zone: UTC+05:30 (IST)
- ISO 3166 code: IN-AS-BA
- Website: https://barpeta.assam.gov.in/

Barpeta District is an administrative district in the state of Assam in India. The district headquarters are located at Barpeta. The district occupies an area of 3,245 km^{2} (1,253 sq mi) and has a population of 1,642,420 (as of 2001).

== History ==
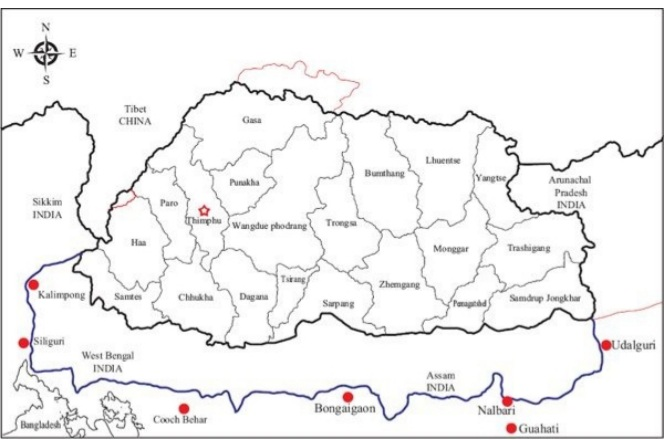
Southern Boundary of Bhutan in blue before the Duar War of 1865

Barpeta district was created in 1983 when it was split from Kamrup district. In 2020, Bajali subdivision was split from Barpeta to be a fully-fledged district.

== Geography ==
Barpeta district occupies an area of 3,245 square kilometres (1,253 sq mi), comparatively equivalent to Russia's Iturup Island. After the creation of Baksa and Bajali Districts, the current area of Barpeta District is 2243.96 sq. km.

== Educational institution ==
Barpeta Medical College and Hospital is the fifth medical college of Assam based in Barpeta. The classes were formally inaugurated in August 2012 by then health minister of Assam, Himanta Biswa Sarma, after it received the permission from the Medical Council of India even though the hospital section was inaugurated on 11 February 2011.

=== Schools ===
==== Assam board ====
- Harendra Chitra College, Bhaktardoba also known as H.C. College, is an undergraduate college established in the year 1992 at Bhaktardoba of Barpeta district in Assam.
- Barbhitha High School, established in 1947, located in the southwestern part of Barpeta District
- K. K. Pathak High School, Kalgachia, established in 1975, located in Kalgachia town in the western part of Barpeta district
- Padmapara High School, established in 1981, located in Padmapara village in the southeastern part of Barpeta district

==== CBSE ====
- Adarsh Vidyalaya, Dahalapara
- Adarsh Vidyalaya, Mandia
- Adarsh Vidyalaya, Ganakkuchi
- Adarsh Vidyalaya, Chenga Village
- Adarsh Vidyalaya, Pakabetbari
- Adarsh Vidyalaya, Gomafulbari
- Jawahar Navodaya Vidyalaya
- Kendriya Vidyalaya, Barpeta
- Christ Jyoti School
- Don Bosco School
- Manas Valley Academy
- Pathsala Public School
- Sreeram Academy
- Kishalay Shishu Niketan, Sarupeta, Established In 1993 Located In Sarupeta

== Economy ==
In 2006 the Indian government named Barpeta one of the country's 250 most backward districts (out of a total of 640). It is one of the eleven districts in Assam currently receiving funds from the Backward Regions Grant Fund Programme (BRGF).

== Divisions ==
There are eight Assam Legislative Assembly constituencies in this district: Barpeta, Baghbor, Bhawanipur, Chenga, Jania, Patacharkuchi, Sarukhetri, Sorbhog. Sorbhog is in the Kokrajhar Lok Sabha constituency, whilst the other seven are in the Barpeta Lok Sabha constituency. The District has only 1 Subdivision that is, Barpeta Sadar Subdivision.

== Demographics ==
Historical population
Year	Pop.	±% p.a.
1901	100,258	—
1911	120,332	+1.84%
1921	161,292	+2.97%
1931	272,623	+5.39%
1941	392,750	+3.72%
1951	466,475	+1.74%
1961	607,434	+2.68%
1971	828,404	+3.15%
1991	1,163,166	+1.71%
2001	1,394,755	+1.83%
2011	1,693,622	+1.96%

According to the 2011 census, the Barpeta district has a population of 1,693,622, roughly equal to the nation of Guinea-Bissau or the US state of Idaho. This gives it a ranking of 292nd in India (out of a total of 640.) The district has a population density of 632 inhabitants per square kilometre (1,640/sq mi). Its population growth rate over the decade 2001–2011 was 21.4%. Barpeta has a sex ratio of 951 females for every 1000 males, and a literacy rate of 65.03%.

The divided district has a population of 1,439,806, of which 136,111 (9.45%) live in urban areas. Barpeta has a sex ratio of 949 females per 1000 males. Scheduled Castes and Scheduled Tribes make up 76,128 (5.29%) and 15,858 (1.10%) of the population respectively.

=== Languages ===
Languages in Barpeta district (2011)
1. Bengali (68.9%)
2. Assamese (29.4%)
3. Boro (1.03%)
4. Others (0.69%)

At the time of the 2011 census in the residual district, 68.89% of the population spoke Bengali, 29.39% Assamese and 1.03% Bodo as their first language.

=== Religions ===
Religions in residual Barpeta district (2011)
Religion	Percent
Islam	77.58%
Hinduism	22.27%
Other or not stated	0.15%

In Barpeta district, as per the 2011 Indian census, Islam is the most followed religion with 1,117,033 (77.58%) adherents, while Hinduism is followed by 320,578 (22.27%) of the population. Small percentages of followers of Sikhism, Jainism and Buddhism are also present. Muslims are mainly rural and form over 83% of the rural population, while Hindus are majority in urban areas. Way back in 1971, Hindus were slight majority in Barpeta district with forming 51.1% of the population, while Muslims were 48.6% at that time.

Population of circles by religion
Circle	Muslims	Hindus	Others
Barnagar (Pt)	49.48%	50.15%	0.37%
Kalgachia	99.22%	0.71%	0.07%
Baghbor	96.38%	3.53%	0.09%
Chenga	84.15%	15.76%	0.09%
Barpeta	76.49%	23.37%	0.14%
Sarthebari	57.32%	42.53%	0.15%

== See also ==
- Chapar Bori
