= Barpeta =

Barpeta Tatikuchi
- Town
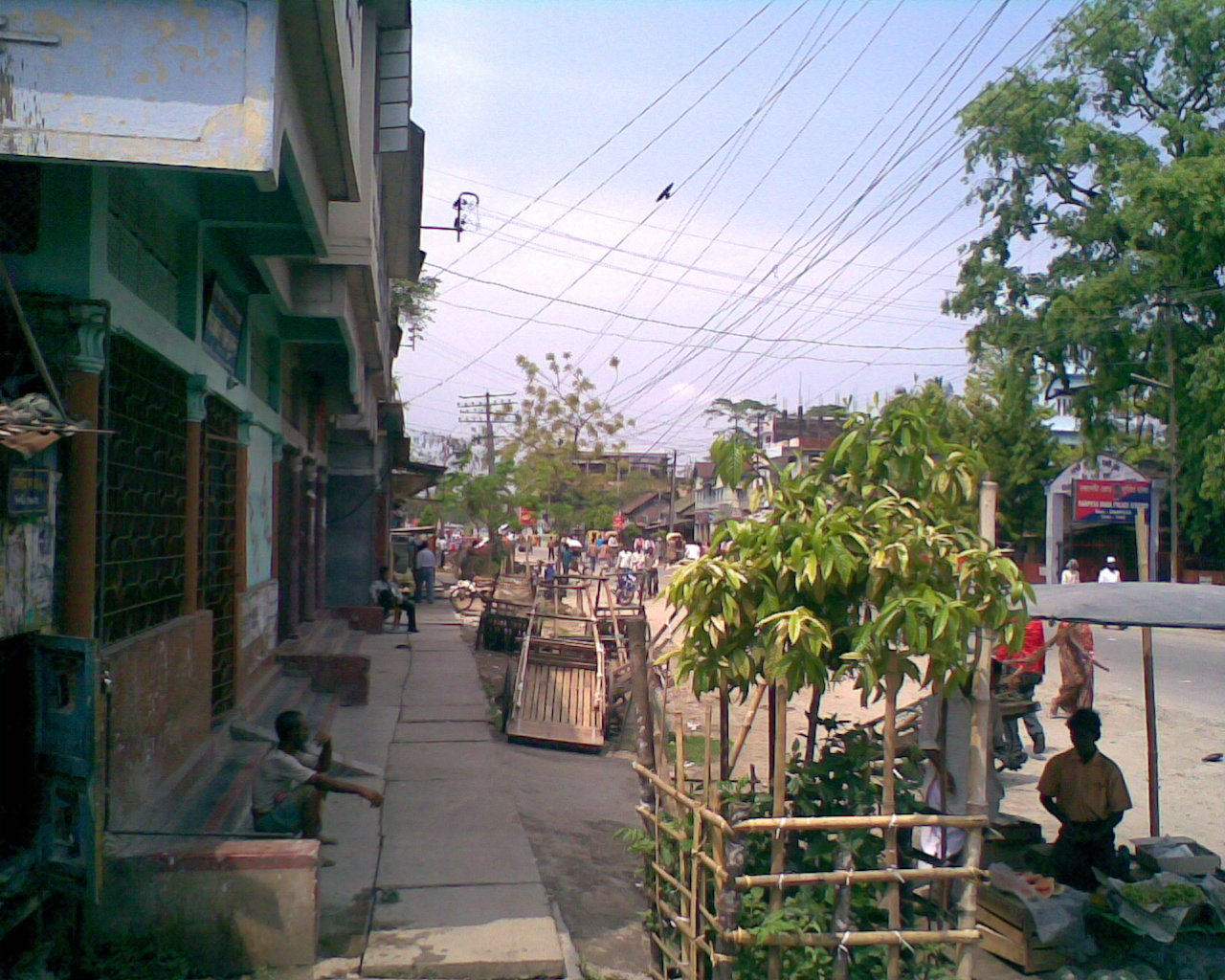
- Nickname: Satra Nagari
- Location in Assam, India Barpeta (India)
- Coordinates: 26.32°N 91.0°E
- Country: India
- State: Assam
- District: Barpeta
- Elevation: 35 m (115 ft)

Population (2011)
  - Total: 42,649

Languages
  - Official: Assamese
  - Native: Barpetia dialect (of Assamese)
- Time zone: UTC+5:30 (IST)
- PIN: 781301
- ISO 3166 code: IN-AS
- Vehicle registration: AS-15
- Website: barpeta.assam.gov.in

Barpeta is a town in Barpeta district of the state of Assam in India and is district headquarters. The city is located 90 kilometres (56 mi) north west of Guwahati and is one of the major cities in Western Assam. It is also called Satra Nagari (Temple town) of Assam due to the presence of various Vaishnavite Satras in the vicinity. The biggest Holi (Doul Mahotsav) of Northeast India is celebrated in Barpeta.

== Geography ==
It is located at 26.32°N 91.0°E. It has an average elevation of 35 metres (114 feet). It is 40 km away from Manas National Park. Three rivers - Chaulkhowa, Mora Nodi (Dead River) and Nakhanda, both of which are tributaries to Brahmaputra run through the town.

== History ==
The Barpeta was earlier known as 'Tatikuchi', where Tati stands for weaver and Kuchi means cluster of villages in native Barpetia dialect, i.e. the land of weavers. In ancient times, it was central part of erstwhile ancient Kamrup, included in Kamapitha of Kamarupa Pithas, the ancient divisions of old Kamrup region. During the medieval period, the Neo-Vaishnavite movement, led by Srimanta Sankardeva and his disciple Madhavdeva, established monastic institutions (Satras) in the region.

In nineteenth century, Barpeta town and adjoining areas became part of Undivided Kamrup district, as Barpeta subdivision. In 1983, the subdivision attained district status.

== Culture ==
Barpeta is a center of the Ekasarana Dharma (Neo-Vaishnavite) movement in Assam. The town is home to the Barpeta Satra, which was established by the saint-scholar Madhavdeva in the 16th century. This institution is associated with the preservation of Sattriya culture, including classical dance, traditional mask-making, and the rendering of Borgeet (devotional songs).

== Forestry ==
Barpeta is the gateway to Manas National Park, one of the National Parks of Assam and one of the few tiger reserves of India.

== Economy ==
Historically known as 'Tatikuchi' (the land of weavers), the local economy includes traditional handloom industries, such as the weaving of Assamese textiles like the Mekhela chador and Gamosa. Agriculture is the primary occupation in the surrounding areas, with rice, jute, and mustard as the principal crops. The town serves as a commercial center for the Western Assam region.

== Demographics ==
Religion in Barpeta district (2011)
1. Islam (70.7%)
2. Hinduism (29.1%)
3. Others (0.15%)

Hindus form the majority of the town's population, but in surrounding area is Muslim people's, followed by Muslims. As of 2011 India census, Barpeta had a population of 42,649. Population of Children within age of 0-6 is 3673 which is 8.61% of total population of Barpeta. The female Sex Ratio is of 1008 against state average of 958. Moreover, Child Sex Ratio in Barpeta is around 994 compared to Assam state average of 962. Literacy rate of Barpeta city is 90.77% higher than state average of 72.19%. In Barpeta, Male literacy is around 94.86% while female literacy rate is 86.73%.

Languages spoken in Barpeta town (2011)
1. Bengali (55.9%)
2. Assamese (14.5%)
3. Hindi (9.94%)
4. Bodo (2.07%)
5. Others (17.6%)

Bengali is spoken by 23,827 people, Assamese is spoken by 6,193, Hindi by 4242, Bodo by 884 and 7,509 people speak other languages. Most of these people are Bengali Hindus and Bengali Muslims, Assamese people, Hindi speaking people and others. Bengali, Assamese and Hindi are the major languages spoken in the town.

== Climate ==
Barpeta has a subtropical climate, with chilly winters and hot, humid summers. However, residents here can enjoy both seasons. Sometimes, on a hot day, the temperature in this city varies from 35°C to 39°C.

Climate data for Barpeta
Month	Jan	Feb	Mar	Apr	May	Jun	Jul	Aug	Sep	Oct	Nov	Dec	Year
Record high °C (°F)	28.8 (83.8)	32.2 (90.0)	38.4 (101.1)	39.0 (102.2)	37.0 (98.6)	38.3 (100.9)	36.5 (97.7)	36.2 (97.2)	35.8 (96.4)	34.3 (93.7)	31.0 (87.8)	28.1 (82.6)	39.0 (102.2)
Mean daily maximum °C (°F)	23.6 (74.5)	26.2 (79.2)	30.0 (86.0)	31.2 (88.2)	31.2 (88.2)	31.7 (89.1)	31.9 (89.4)	32.2 (90.0)	31.7 (89.1)	30.3 (86.5)	27.6 (81.7)	24.7 (76.5)	29.4 (84.9)
Mean daily minimum °C (°F)	10.3 (50.5)	12.0 (53.6)	15.9 (60.6)	20.0 (68.0)	22.7 (72.9)	24.9 (76.8)	25.6 (78.1)	25.6 (78.1)	24.7 (76.5)	21.9 (71.4)	16.7 (62.1)	11.8 (53.2)	19.3 (66.8)
Record low °C (°F)	−2.7 (27.1)	−0.5 (31.1)	6.1 (43.0)	11.1 (52.0)	16.2 (61.2)	20.4 (68.7)	21.4 (70.5)	22.1 (71.8)	17.7 (63.9)	10.6 (51.1)	5.5 (41.9)	−0.7 (30.7)	−2.7 (27.1)
Average rainfall mm (inches)	11.9 (0.47)	18.3 (0.72)	55.8 (2.20)	147.9 (5.82)	244.2 (9.61)	316.4 (12.46)	345.4 (13.60)	264.3 (10.41)	185.9 (7.32)	91.2 (3.59)	18.7 (0.74)	7.1 (0.28)	1,717.7 (67.63)
Average rainy days	1.8	2.9	5.8	13.1	17.0	19.6	22.3	18.5	15.2	7.4	2.8	1.3	127.7
Average relative humidity (%)	79	65	57	68	75	81	83	82	83	82	82	82	77
Mean monthly sunshine hours	226.3	214.7	220.1	201.0	192.2	132.0	124.0	161.2	138.0	204.6	231.0	232.5	2,277.6
Source: World Meteorological Organization

== Politics ==
Barpeta is part of Barpeta (Lok Sabha constituency). Indian president Fakaruddin Ali Ahmed was an MLA from Jania LAC and MP from the Barpeta constituency. Syed Abdur Rouf, A.F Golam Osmani and other prominent persons represented Barpeta in the constitutional assembly. Phani Bhusan Choudhury of Asom Gana Parishad is the current MP from Barpeta Lok Sabha constituency since the year 2024. There 7 nos of Assembly Constituency in the district. Those are Jania, Baghbar, Sorbhog, Sarukhetri, Bhabanipur, Chenga and Barpeta.

== Transport ==
The nearest railway station, airport and port is Barpeta Road, Lokpriya Gopinath Bordoloi International Airport and Dhubri respectively. Barpeta town is connected to National Highway 31 through Howly, and National Highway 427 via Hajo-Doulashal connects it to Guwahati.

== Education ==
Barpeta has good educational environment. The town has produced so many noble figures of Assam. Few of them are Ambikagiri Raichoudhury, Banikanta Kakati, Mahendra Mohan Choudhry and Purushottam Das. Some of the well known higher educational institutions of Barpeta are Barpeta Vidyapith Higher Secondary School, Kendriya Vidyalaya Barpeta, Madhab Choudhury College and Barpeta Girls' College. It also has the fifth medical college of Assam, the Fakhruddin Ali Ahmed Medical College and Hospital.

== Notable people ==
- Fakhruddin Ali Ahmed, fifth President of India
- Chandra Bharati, poet
- Bhattadeva, father of Assamese prose
- Mahendra Mohan Choudhry, fourth chief minister of Assam
- Colonel Guru Prasad Das, Indian scientist
- Bhupendra Nath Goswami, Indian scientist
- Banikanta Kakati, linguist
- Rameshwar Pathak, Kamrupi Lokgeet singer
- Kalpana Patowary, singer
- Ambikagiri Raichoudhury, poet and nationalist
