= Mizan (disambiguation) =

Mizan is an Arabic word and an Islamic concept.

Mizan may also refer to:

== Islam ==
- Mizan (treatise), a treatise on the contents of Islam, written by the Pakistani Islamic scholar Javed Ahmad Ghamidi.
- Tafsir al-Mizan, a quranic tafsir by Ayatollah Sayyid Muhammad Hussein Tabataba'i

== Organizations ==
- Al-Mizan Charitable Trust, a British charity
- Mizan (Iranian newspaper), a newspaper published in Iran between 1980 and 1981
- Mizan (Ottoman newspaper), an Ottoman newspaper published 1886–1909
- Mizan News Agency, the news agency of the Iranian judiciary

== People ==
=== Given name ===
- Mizan (musician), Ethiopian singer
- Mizan Alem (born 2002), Ethiopian long-distance runner
- Mizan Mehari (1980–2007), Australian athlete
- Mizancı Murat (1853–1912), Ottoman monarchist
- Mizan Rahman (1932–2015), Bangladeshi Canadian mathematician and writer
- Mizan Zainal Abidin of Terengganu (born 1962), Malaysian sultan

=== Surname ===
- Hasibul Islam Mizan (1957–2019), Bangladeshi film director
- Ibne Mizan (1930–2017), Bangladeshi film director
- Majnun Mizan, Bangladeshi actor

=== Arabic-based compound names with Mizan as an element ===
- Dr. Mizanul Haque Kishoreganji (1945–2020), Bangladeshi politician
- Dr. Muhammad Mizanuddin (born 1953), vice-chancellor of Rajshahi University, Bangladesh
- Mizanur Rahman (disambiguation), multiple people

== Places ==
- Mizan, Iran, a village
- Mizan (Dogu'a Tembien), a municipality in Ethiopia
- The star Beta Trianguli has been called Mizan
