= Mizanur Rahman =

Mizanur Rahman (Bengali: মিজানুর রহমান, lit. 'Balance of the Most Merciful') is a Bengali masculine given name of Arabic origin. Notable people with the name include:

== People ==
- Mijanur Rahman (born 1958), Bangladeshi academic
- Mijanur Rahman Khan (born 1965), Bangladeshi major general
- Mizanur Rahman (Bangladeshi diplomat), Bangladeshi diplomat, ambassador to Oman
- Mizanur Rahman (cricketer) (born 1991), Bangladeshi cricketer
- Mizanur Rahman (Islamic activist) (born 1983), Bangladeshi Islamic activist who was convicted of solicitation to murder
- Mizanur Rahman (police officer), Bangladeshi police officer
- Mizanur Rahman (politician), Bangladeshi politician
- Mizanur Rahman (professor), Bangladeshi legal academic and human rights advocate
- Mizanur Rahman Aryan (born 1991), Bangladeshi scriptwriter
- Mizanur Rahman Bhuiyan (died 2020), Bangladeshi judge
- Mizanur Rahman Chowdhury (1928–2006), Bangladeshi politician
- Mizanur Rahman Chowdhury (Jamaat-e-Islami politician) (died 2013), Bangladeshi politician and freedom fighter
- Mizanur Rahman Dawn (born 1979), Bangladeshi footballer
- Mizanur Rahman Khan Dipu (born 1964), Bangladeshi politician
- Mizanur Rahman Kazi (born 1976), Bangladeshi doctor and politician
- Mizanur Rahman Manu, Bangladeshi politician
- Mizanur Rahman Minu (born 1958), Bangladeshi politician
- Mizanur Rahman Mizan (born 1968), Bangladeshi cricketer
- Mizanur Rahman Shamim (born 1968), Bangladeshi lieutenant general
- Mizanur Rahman Shelley (1943–2019), Bangladeshi minister and political scientist
- Mizanur Rahman Sinha (1943–2026), Bangladeshi politician, managing director of Acme Laboratories
- Md Mizanur Rahman (born 1978), Bangladeshi kabaddi player
- Mohammad Mizanur Rahman (born 1957), Bangladeshi politician
- SBM Mizanur Rahman (died 1971), Bangladeshi civil servant and freedom fighter
- Sufi Mohammed Mizanur Rahman (born 1943), Bangladeshi industrialist, founder of PHP Family

== See also ==
- Mizan (disambiguation)
- Rahman (name)
