= Aashiq =

Aashiq, a word meaning one who practices ishq (love) in Urdu and Hindi, may refer to:

== People ==
=== In arts and scholarship ===
- Aashiq Elahi Meerthi (1881–1941), Indian Islamic scholar, biographer, translator and writer
- Ashiq Ilahi Bulandshahri (1925–2002), Indian Islamic scholar and author
- Aashiq Abu (born 1978), Indian film director, producer, actor and distributor in Malayalam cinema
- Ashiq Usman (born 1986), Indian film producer and actor

=== In politics ===
- Ashiq Husain Khan (born 1984), Pakistani politician
- Ashiq Hussain Faktoo, Kashmiri separatist leader
- Ashiq Hussain Qureshi (1949–2019), Pakistani cricketer and politician
- Sardar Ashiq Hussain, Pakistani politician
- Syed Ashiq Hussain Bukhari, Pakistani politician

=== In sport ===
- Ashiq Hussain Qureshi (1949–2019), Pakistani cricketer and politician
- Ashique Kuruniyan (born 1997), Indian footballer
- Ashik Punchoo (born 1976), Indian-Mauritian footballer

=== In other fields ===
- Aashiq Ali (disambiguation), multiple people
- Ashiqur Rahman (disambiguation), multiple people
- Ashiq-uz-Zaman, multiple people
- Mohamed Ashik (born 2004), Indian child prodigy
- Ashik Chowdhury (born 1984), Bangladeshi economist, banker and chartered financial analyst
- Syed Ashik Rahman, Bangladeshi chief executive officer of RTV

== Arts and entertainment ==
- Aashiq (1962 film), an Indian Hindi-language film by Hrishikesh Mukherjee
- Aashiq (2001 film), an Indian Hindi-language film by Indra Kumar
- Aashiq Sawney, a fictional character from the British soap opera Doctors

== See also ==
- Ashik, bards in the Caucasus and Anatolia
- Aşık, a Turkish name
- Aashik Awara, a 1993 Indian Hindi-language film
- Aashiq Banaya Aapne, a 2005 Indian Hindi-language romantic thriller film
- Aashiq Hoon Baharon Ka, a 1977 Indian Hindi-language film
- Aashiq Biwi Ka, an Indian television series
- Ashiq Vanna Divasam, a 2018 Indian film
- Aashiqui (disambiguation)
- Ishq (disambiguation)
