= Rahman (name) =

Rahman رحمن
- Rahman in calligraphy
- Pronunciation: Rah-man
- Gender: Male
- Language: Arabic

Origin
- Meaning: Gracious, Merciful, King, Lord
- Region of origin: Arabian Peninsula

Other names
- See also: Rahim

Rahman or Rehman (Arabic: رحمن, romanized: Raḥmān) is an Arabic and Hebrew origin surname meaning "Gracious", "King", "Merciful" or "Lord" based on the triconsonantal root R-Ḥ-M. With nisba (Arabic onomastic), the name becomes Rehmani, meaning "descendant of the gracious one". It is also used as a surname by some people belonging to the Sayyed community and some Pashtuns in India and Pakistan.

The Rahman/Rehman name doesn't represent any religion but it is common name In Islam, Ar-Rahman (The Most Gracious) is one of the Names of God and name of the surah.

== People ==
- A. R. Rahman (born 1967), Oscar Award-winning Indian music composer, singer, and songwriter
- Aarif Lee (born Aarif Rahman) (born 1987), Chinese-Canadian singer, songwriter and actor
- Amrah bint Abdul Rahman (died 717), Islamic scholar
- Emomali Rahmon (Tajik: Эмомалӣ Раҳмон Persian: امام‌علی رحمان [emɔmaˈli raɦˈmɔn]) (born Эмомалӣ Шарифович Раҳмонов; Emomali Sharipovich Rahmanov; Kulob, 5 October 1952), President of Tajikistan since 1994
- Hasim Rahman (born 1972), former heavyweight boxing champion
- Kader Rahman (1938–2024), Hong Kong field hockey player
- Merina Rahman (born 1943), Bangladeshi Jatiya Party politician and Member of Parliament
- Md Mostaqur Rahman (born 1966), Bangladeshi cost and management accountant, 14th governor of Bangladesh Bank
- Mizan Rahman (1932–2015), Bangladeshi Canadian mathematician and writer
- Naa'imur Zakariyah Rahman (born 1997), attempted assassin of Theresa May
- Perween Rahman (1957–2013), Pakistani social activist
- Rahman (born 1967), is an Indian actor.
- Rahaman Ali (1943–2025), American boxer
- Tahera Rahman (born 1991), American newscaster
- Tahmidur Rahman (born 1963), Bangladeshi chess player
- Talyn Rahman-Figueroa (born 1985), British diplomatic director and novelist
- Zoe Rahman (born 1971), English jazz composer and pianist

== Variations ==
Rahman has many ways to be written in different languages.

== Second half of compound name ==
See the following pages:

- Abd al-Rahman
- Anis-ur-Rahman
- Ashiq-ur-Rahman
- Ata-ur-Rahman
- Ateeq-ur-Rahman
- Azizur Rahman
- Fazl ur Rahman
- Ghulam Rahman
- Habib ur Rahman
- Hafizur Rahman
- Khalil-ur-Rahman
- Latif-ur-Rahman
- Lutf-ur-Rahman
- Mahbub ur Rahman
- Mahfuz ur Rahman
- Mahmud ur Rahman
- Matiur Rahman
- Mizan-ur-Rahman
- Mustafiz-ur-Rahman
- Mujibur Rahman
- Saif ur Rahman
- Shafiq ur Rahman
- Shams ur Rahman
- Zia ur Rahman

Also the following individual names:

- Abdur Rehman Peshawari (1886–1925), Turkish soldier, journalist and diplomat
- Ahfaz-ur-Rahman (1942–2020), Pakistani journalist, writer and poet
- Ahsan ur Rehman Mazari (born 1981), Pakistani politician
- Akbar-ur-Rehman (born 1983), Pakistani cricketer
- Alaur Rahman (born 1960), Bangladeshi-born British singer
- Asad Ur Rehman (born 1942), Pakistani politician
- Maqbular Rahman Sarkar (1928–1985), Bangladeshi academic and tenth vice-chancellor of Rajshahi University
- Muhammad Baligh Ur Rehman (born 1970), Pakistani Politician
- Fasih Ur Rehman, Pakistani dancer
- Hasan Hafizur Rahman (1932–1983), Bangladeshi author and newspaper editor
- Hifz-ur-Rehman (died 1970), Pakistani archaeologist, historian and linguist
- Ijaz-ur-Rehman (born 1983), Pakistani ten-pin bowler
- Montazur Rahman Akbar (born 1957), Bangladeshi film director, screenwriter and producer
- Muhammad Muneeb ur Rehman (born 1945), Pakistani grand mufti
- Naimur Rahman (born 1974), Bangladeshi cricketer
- Nasim Ur Rehman, Pakistani industrialist and politician
- Raza-ur-Rehman (born 1985), Canadian cricketer
- Riaz-ur-Rehman (1940–1966), Pakistani cricketer
- Riaz ur Rehman Saghar (1940–2013) Pakistani poet and lyricist active in cinema
- Sadiq-ur-Rahman Kidwai, Indian writer
- Sadiqur Rahman (born 1987), Bangladeshi cricketer
- Safiur Rahman Mubarakpuri (1943–2006), Indian writer
- Shafi ur Rahman (1929–2021), judge of Supreme Court of Pakistan
- Shafiur Rahman (1918–1952), martyr of the Bangladesh language movement
- Mir Shakil-ur-Rahman (born 1957), Pakistani newspaper editor
- Tanzil-ur-Rahman (born 1928) Pakistani jurist and Islamic scholar
- Wali-ur-Rehman (1970–2013), Tehrik-e-Taliban Pakistan (TTP) commander
- Waliur Rahman Bhuiyan (1952–2020), Bangladeshi businessman
- Zaki ur Rehman Lakhvi (born 1960), a leader of Lashkar-e-Taiba

== Alias ==
- Rahman, alias of Iskandar bin Rahmat, Singaporean convicted murderer and former police officer who was under a sentence of death since December 2015 for the 2013 Kovan double murders of Tan Boon Sin and Tan Chee Heong in Singapore.

== See also ==
- Rahma (disambiguation)
- Rahmane
