= Atikur Rahman =

Human rights defender (born 1994)

- Born: 1994 (age 31–32)
- Education: Ph.D.
- Alma mater: Chaudhary Charan Singh University
- Occupation: Activist

Atikur Rahman (born 1994) is a member of the Popular Front of India and a human rights defender who has been involved in activism in India. He was arrested on 5 October 2020, along with journalist Siddique Kappan, student Masood Ahmad, and taxi driver Mohammad Alam while they were on their way to meet the family of a Dalit woman who was raped and murdered in Hathras, Uttar Pradesh.

== Arrest and charges ==
Atikur along with three others was arrested in October 2020 whilst en path to Hathras, Uttar Pradesh, following the alleged gang rape and murder of a 19-year-antique Dalit girl. Uttar Pradesh's Special Task Force officially charged them with multiple offenses, including sedition, criminal conspiracy, terror funding, and promoting enmity among one-of-a-kind companies based on various factors like faith and place of house and claimed that they were purportedly journeying to Hathras with the purpose to disturb peace as part of a conspiracy. They were also charged with sections 17 and 18 of the Unlawful Activities (Prevention) Act associated with elevating funds for terror acts and numerous sections of the IT Act.

In March 2023, He was granted bail in a case filed under the Unlawful Activities Prevention Act. However, his release from detention was delayed due to the absence of bail in the Prevention of Money Laundering Activities case lodged against him. Subsequently, in May of the same year, a court in Uttar Pradesh granted him bail in connection with a case filed by the Enforcement Directorate.

== Health deterioration ==
Rahman's health deteriorated while in detention; he developed a neurological disease in addition to an existing heart ailment, leading to paralysis on the left side of his body and memory loss. Despite his condition, there were reports of delays and denials of medical treatment. Amnesty International and other human rights organizations have called for his immediate release, stating that his detention was arbitrary and solely for peacefully exercising his human rights.

After spending 32 months in jail, Atikur Rahman was finally released. He was a Ph.D. student at Meerut's Chaudhary Charan Singh University and also the national office bearer of Campus Front of India, a student movement. He was active during the anti-Citizenship Amendment Act (CAA) protests and has been vocal about issues affecting marginalized communities in India.
