= Ishq (disambiguation) =

Ishq is a word meaning love.

Ishq may also refer to these Indian films:

- Ishq (1997 film), a Bollywood film
- Ishq (album), 2001 album by Junoon
- Ishq (2012 film), a Telugu film
- Ishq (2019 film), a Malayalam film
- Ishq (2021 film), a Telugu film

== See also ==
- Ishk (disambiguation)
- Aashiq (disambiguation)
- Aashiqui (disambiguation)
- Issaq or Ishq, a 2013 Indian film, based on Romeo and Juliet
- Ishqiya, 2010 Indian film
  - Ishqiya (soundtrack), by Vishal Bhardwaj
  - Dedh Ishqiya, 2014 Indian film, sequel of Ishqiya
  - Ishqiya 3, an upcoming Indian film, third installment in the series
