= Atiqur Rahman (disambiguation) =

Atiqur Rahman (also spelt Atiqur Rehman or Attiqur Rahman) is a South Asian masculine Muslim given name. It may refer to:

- Atiqur Rahman Usmani (1901–1984), Indian Islamic scholar and politician
- Atiqur Rehman, Indian politician
- Mohammed Attiqur Rahman (1918–1996), Pakistani army general
- Dr. Atiqur Rahman (1931–1971), Bangladeshi physician and martyred intellectual
- M. Atiqur Rahman (1931–2023) was a Bangladeshi Army general
- Atikur Rahman Mallik (died 2017), Bangladeshi film editor
- Mohammed Atiqur Rahman Atique (born 1961), Bangladeshi football coach and former football player
- Syed Atiqur Rahman (born 1975), Bangladeshi volleyball player
- Atiqur Rahman Meshu (born 1988), Bangladeshi football coach and former player
- Dr. Atiqur Rahman Mujahid (born 1992), Bangladeshi politician and Islamic scholar
- Dr. Atikur Rahman (born 1994), Indian human rights activist
- Atiqur Rahman Fahad (born 1995), Bangladeshi professional footballer
- Munshi Atiqur Rahman, Assistant Superintendent of Bangladesh Criminal Investigation
- Ateequr Rahman, Bangladeshi sports shooter

== See also ==
- Ateeq
- Rahman (name)
