= Khorsedur Rahman Khan =

Meghalaya politician

Muhammad Khorsedur Rahman Khan

Member of Meghalaya Legislative Assembly
- In office 1983–1988
- Preceded by: Mozibur Rahman
- Succeeded by: Miriam D. Shira
- Constituency: Rajabala

Personal details
- Born: Rajabala, Meghalaya
- Party: Indian National Congress

Muhammad Khorsedur Rahman Khan, also known as Advocate K. R. Khan, was an Indian politician and an advocate by profession. He was the second MLA for the Rajabala constituency in the Meghalaya Legislative Assembly.

== Life ==
Khan was born into a Bengali Muslim family in the village of Kasaripara in the Hallidayganj, Garo Hills of Meghalaya. Despite being an Indian National Congress candidate, he lost against Mozibur Rahman at the 1978 Meghalaya Legislative Assembly election for the Rajabala constituency. However, he defeated his rival in the 1983 Meghalaya Legislative Assembly election.
