= Mozibur Rahman =

Meghalaya politician

Member of Meghalaya Legislative Assembly
- In office 1978–1983
- Preceded by: Post established
- Succeeded by: Khorsedur Rahman Khan
- Constituency: Rajabala

Personal details
- Born: Kasaripara, Hallidayganj, Meghalaya
- Party: Independent

Mozibur Rahman was an Indian politician and teacher. He was the inaugural holder of the Rajabala constituency in the Meghalaya Legislative Assembly.

== Life ==
Rahman was born into a Bengali Muslim family in the village of Kasaripara in the Hallidayganj, Garo Hills of Meghalaya. Despite being an independent candidate, he defeated Khorsedur Rahman Khan of the Indian National Congress at the 1978 Meghalaya Legislative Assembly election, thus winning the Rajabala constituency of West Garo Hills district. He also participated in the 1983 Meghalaya Legislative Assembly election but was unsuccessful. Rahman also worked as a teacher at the Samser Ali H.S. School.
