= Rahma =

Rahma most commonly refers to an Arabic name, which may refer to:

- Al-Rahma mosque, on Hatherley Street, Liverpool, England
- Malak al-Rahma, a 1946 Egyptian film directed and written by Youssef Wahbi

"Rahma" is also a Hebrew name, which refers to motherhood, compassion, forgiveness and kindness.

== People ==
=== Given name ===
- Rahma Ali (born 1988), Pakistani singer
- Rahma bint Hassan (born 1969), Jordanian princess
- Rahma el-Dennaoui (born 2004), Australian girl who was abducted
- Rahma El Siddig Mustafa, Sudanese disability rights activist
- Rahmah el Yunusiyah (1900–1969), Indonesian educational activist and nationalist leader
- Rahma Ghars (born 1994), Tunisian footballer
- Rahma Hassan (born 1988), Egyptian actress
- Rahma Haruna (1996/97–2016), Nigerian photo subject
- Rahmah ibn Jabir al-Jalhami (1760–1826), early modern Arab pirate and commander
- Rahma Riad (born 1987), Iraqi singer
- Rahma Tusa (born 1993), Ethiopian long-distance runner

=== Surname ===
- Anas Abu Rahma (born 1985), Palestinian children's author
- Al-Zubayr Rahma Mansur (1830–1913), Sudanese 19th century slave trader and politician
- Kareem Rahma (born 1986), American media figure

== Religion ==
- God's mercy in Islam
- Rahma (Mandaeism), a Mandaic word referring to Mandaean devotional prayers

== See also ==
- Rahman (name)
