= Latifur Rahman (disambiguation) =

Latifur Rahman (1936–2017) was the 10th Chief Justice and the 2nd Chief Adviser of Bangladesh.

Latifur Rahman may also refer to:

- Latif-ur Rehman (1929–1987), Pakistani hockey player
- Latifur Rahman Chiorawi (1945–2020), Bangladeshi industrialist
- Latifur Rahman, Bangladeshi politician
- Latifur Rahman Khan, Bangladeshi-American computer scientist
- Latif-ur-Rehman, Pakistani field hockey player

== See also ==
- Lutfur Rahman, a different name
- Latif
- Rahman (name)#Second half of compound name
