= Madina Mosque, Shillong =

Sunni mosque in Meghalaya, India

Madina Mosque
- Location of the mosque in Meghalaya

Religion
- Affiliation: Sunni Islam
- Ecclesiastical or organisational status: Mosque
- Status: Active

Location
- Location: Laban, Shillong, East Khasi Hills, Meghalaya
- Country: India
- Coordinates: 25°34′01″N 91°52′41″E

Architecture
- Type: Mosque architecture
- Style: Islamic
- Funded by: Shillong Muslim Union
- Established: 2008 (as a congregation)
- Groundbreaking: 2011
- Completed: 2012

Specifications
- Capacity: 2,000 worshippers
- Width: 19 m (61 ft)
- Height (max): 37 m (121 ft)
- Domes: Five (One large, four small)
- Minaret: Four
- Materials: Brick, concrete, glass

The Madina Mosque (Arabic: مسجد المدينة شيلونغ) is a four-storey Sunni mosque in Shillong, in the state of Meghalaya, India. The mosque is the only glass mosque in India, and reputedly the first glass mosque in Asia, and making India the third country to have a mosque built of glass. It is one of the largest mosques in Northeast India, and the biggest in Meghalaya, accommodating more than 2,000 worshippers for congregational prayers. The mosque was opened on 18 October 2012 by the General Secretary of the Shillong Muslim Union Sayeedullah Nongrum and was inaugurated by Salman Khurshid, Shamim Akhtar, and Vincent Pala.

The congregation was established in 2008, with a prayer hall in the Idgah, that was open to males and female worshippers.

== Architecture ==
Made principally of glass, the Madina Mosque consists of a large structure with several domes. The transparent glass walls are symbolic of openness and the congregation invites people of any faith to experience the presence of the God. However, Sayeedullah Nongrum, who assisted with fundraising for the mosque's construction, stated that the mosque was made of glass due its relative low cost, compared with traditional building materials.

The building contains a central prayer hall, several smaller prayer rooms, and courtyards. The mosque is constructed of brick and concrete, with decorative elements such as arched windows and intricate carvings. The exterior of the mosque is painted in a traditional white and green color scheme, and the central dome is adorned with gold-coloured trim. A separate prayer space is provided for female congregants. The mosque also has a large garden. The mosque is 37 metres (121 ft) high and 19 metres (61 ft) wide.

The four-story structure also contains the Meherba Orphanage, the Islamic Library & Information Centre, and the Islamic Theological Institute Markaz. The mosque and the adjoining Eidgah have the capacity to accommodate 8,000 people for an assembly or prayer. Among those who contributed to the construction of the mosque were Christians and Hindus. The mosque is a centre for Islamic study and spirituality.

== Imams ==
- Mr. Hafiz Shakib Nongrum

== See also ==
- Islam in India
- List of mosques in India
