= Aashiq Ali =

Aashiq Ali may refer to:

- Ashiq Ali (born 1995), Pakistani cricketer
- Ashique Ali Khan (1948–1999), Indian musician
- Aashiq Ali Mikrani (died 2007), Nepalese martyr
- Ashig Ali (1801–1911), Azerbaijani poet

== See also ==
- Aashiq (disambiguation)
- Ali (disambiguation)
