= Hafizur Rahman =

Hafizur Rahman may refer to:

- Hafizur Rahman (cricketer), Bangladeshi former cricketer
- Hafizur Rahman (politician)
- Hasan Hafizur Rahman, author
- Md. Hafizur Rahman, Bangladeshi civil servant
- Hafeez-ur-Rehman Dreshak, Pakistani politician
- Hafeez-ur-Rehman, Federally Administered Tribal Areas cricketer
- Hasan Hafizur Rahman (1932–1983), Bangladeshi author and newspaper editor
- Muhammad Hafizur Rahman, Bangladeshi civil servant
