= Aashiqui (disambiguation) =

Aashiqui is a 1990 Indian Hindi-language romantic musical film.

Aashiqui may also refer to:

- Aashiqui (soundtrack), soundtrack for the 1990 film by Nadeem–Shravan
- Aashiqui 2, 2013 sequel to the 1990 film
  - Aashiqui 2 (soundtrack), its soundtrack by Jeet Gannguli, Mithoon and Ankit Tiwari
- Aashiqui (album), 2005, by Jassi Sidhu
- Aashiqui (2015 film), a 2015 Indian-Bangladeshi film by Ashok Pati
- Aashiqui (2022 film), a 2022 Indian Bhojpuri-language film
- Aashiqui.in, a 2011 Indian film
- Ashique Ali Khan (1948–1999), Indian musician
- Ashique Kuruniyan (born 1997), Indian footballer

== See also ==
- Aashiq (disambiguation)
- Ishq (disambiguation)
- "Aashiqui Aa Gayi", a song by Mithoon and Arijit Singh from the 2022 Indian film Radhe Shyam
- Aashiqui Deewangi, a 2001 Indian film
