= Rajabala Assembly constituency =

Legislative Assembly constituency in Meghalaya State, India

Coordinates: 25.76°N 89.97°E

Rajabala
- Constituency No. 47 for the Meghalaya Legislative Assembly

Constituency details
- Country: India
- Region: Northeast India
- State: Meghalaya
- District: West Garo Hills
- Lok Sabha constituency: Tura
- Established: 1978
- Total electors: 35,882
- Reservation: None

Member of Legislative Assembly
- 11th Meghalaya Legislative Assembly
- Incumbent Mizanur Rahman Kazi
- Party: Mamata All India Trinamool Congress
- Elected year: 2023

Rajabala is one of the 60 Legislative Assembly constituencies of Meghalaya state in India.

It is part of West Garo Hills district.

== Members of the Legislative Assembly ==
| Year | Member | Party |
|---|---|---|
| 1978 | Mozibur Rahman | Independent politician |
| 1983 | Khorsedur Rahman Khan | Indian National Congress |
| 1988 | Miriam D. Shira | Independent politician |
| 1993 | Sayeedullah Nongrum | Independent politician |
| 1998 | Kapin Ch. Boro | Indian National Congress |
| 2003 | Sayeedullah Nongrum | Indian National Congress |
| 2008 | Sayeedullah Nongrum | Indian National Congress |
| 2013 | Ashahel D. Shira | Independent politician |
| 2018 | Dr. Azad Zaman | Indian National Congress |
| 2021 By-election | Abdus Saleh | National People's Party |
| 2023 | Dr. Mizanur Rahman Kazi | All India Trinamool Congress |

== Election results ==
=== Assembly Election 2023 ===
2023 Meghalaya Legislative Assembly election: Rajabala
| Party | Candidate | Votes | % | ±% |
|---|---|---|---|---|
| AITC | Mizanur Rahman Kazi | 12,628 | 38.07% | New |
| NPP | Abdus Saleh | 12,618 | 38.04% | ▼1.96 |
| UDP | Ashahel D. Shira | 6,870 | 20.71% | ▼3.81 |
| BJP | Bakul Chandra Hajong | 439 | 1.32% | ▲0.20 |
| IND | Nijum Sangma | 419 | 1.26% | New |
| INC | Carla R. Sangma | 193 | 0.58% | ▼32.90 |
| NOTA | None of the Above | 158 | 0.48% | ▼0.11 |
| Margin of victory | | 10 | 0.03% | ▼6.49 |
| Turnout | | 33,167 | 92.43% | ▲2.57 |
| Registered electors | | 35,882 | | ▲9.10 |
| AITC gain from NPP | | Swing | ▼1.93 | |

=== Assembly By-election 2021 ===
2021 Meghalaya Legislative Assembly by-election: Rajabala
| Party | Candidate | Votes | % | ±% |
|---|---|---|---|---|
| NPP | Abdus Saleh | 11,823 | 40.00% | ▲21.19 |
| INC | Hashina Yasmin Mondal | 9,897 | 33.49% | ▲6.53 |
| UDP | Ashahel D. Shira | 7,247 | 24.52% | New |
| BJP | Kingstone B. Marak | 333 | 1.13% | ▼2.88 |
| IND | Carla R. Sangma | 255 | 0.86% | New |
| NOTA | None of the Above | 174 | 0.59% | ▼0.07 |
| Margin of victory | | 1,926 | 6.52% | ▲3.11 |
| Turnout | | 29,555 | 90.46% | ▼3.84 |
| Registered electors | | 32,890 | | ▲11.96 |
| NPP gain from INC | | Swing | ▲13.05 | |

=== Assembly Election 2018 ===
2018 Meghalaya Legislative Assembly election: Rajabala
| Party | Candidate | Votes | % | ±% |
|---|---|---|---|---|
| INC | Azad Zaman | 7,420 | 26.96% | ▲18.66 |
| Independent | Ashahel D. Shira | 6,482 | 23.55% | New |
| Independent | Abdus Saleh | 5,891 | 21.40% | New |
| NPP | Mizanur Rahman Kazi | 5,178 | 18.81% | ▲16.83 |
| Independent | Zinbaward N. Sangma | 1,115 | 4.05% | New |
| BJP | Sofior Rahman | 1,102 | 4.00% | New |
| NOTA | None of the Above | 182 | 0.66% | New |
| Margin of victory | | 938 | 3.41% | ▼0.30 |
| Turnout | | 27,525 | 93.70% | ▲0.88 |
| Registered electors | | 29,376 | | ▲13.52 |
| INC gain from Independent | | Swing | ▼0.40 | |

=== Assembly Election 2013 ===
2013 Meghalaya Legislative Assembly election: Rajabala
| Party | Candidate | Votes | % | ±% |
|---|---|---|---|---|
| Independent | Ashahel D. Shira | 6,572 | 27.36% | New |
| Independent | Dr. Azad Zaman | 5,681 | 23.65% | New |
| Independent | Abdus Saleh | 4,082 | 16.99% | New |
| UDP | Dr. Mizanur Rahman Kazi | 2,806 | 11.68% | ▲11.10 |
| INC | Sayeedullah Nongrum | 1,993 | 8.30% | ▼29.75 |
| SP | Rahibul Islam Sarker | 1,089 | 4.53% | New |
| NPP | Sofior Rahman | 475 | 1.98% | New |
| Margin of victory | | 891 | 3.71% | ▼4.22 |
| Turnout | | 24,019 | 92.82% | ▲0.49 |
| Registered electors | | 25,877 | | ▲14.05 |
| Independent gain from INC | | Swing | ▼10.68 | |

=== Assembly Election 2008 ===
2008 Meghalaya Legislative Assembly election: Rajabala
| Party | Candidate | Votes | % | ±% |
|---|---|---|---|---|
| INC | Sayeedullah Nongrum | 7,970 | 38.04% | ▼2.96 |
| NCP | Ashahel D. Shira | 6,308 | 30.11% | ▼9.66 |
| Independent | Dr. Kapin Ch Boro | 3,552 | 16.96% | New |
| Independent | Sisir Marak | 2,415 | 11.53% | New |
| BJP | Samarendra A.Sangma | 343 | 1.64% | ▼12.09 |
| Independent | Milson Sangma | 151 | 0.72% | New |
| UDP | Jahannara B.Kharbhih | 121 | 0.58% | ▼0.37 |
| Margin of victory | | 1,662 | 7.93% | ▲6.70 |
| Turnout | | 20,949 | 92.33% | ▲13.56 |
| Registered electors | | 22,690 | | ▲2.86 |
| INC hold | | Swing | ▼2.96 | |

=== Assembly Election 2003 ===
2003 Meghalaya Legislative Assembly election: Rajabala
| Party | Candidate | Votes | % | ±% |
|---|---|---|---|---|
| INC | Sayeedullah Nongrum | 7,125 | 41.00% | ▼0.06 |
| NCP | Clement Marak | 6,911 | 39.77% | New |
| BJP | Akhil Hajong | 2,386 | 13.73% | ▲10.34 |
| Independent | Shyamal Kanti Daring | 789 | 4.54% | New |
| UDP | Jaffar Kharkongor | 165 | 0.95% | ▼39.31 |
| Margin of victory | | 214 | 1.23% | ▲0.43 |
| Turnout | | 17,376 | 78.77% | ▼1.72 |
| Registered electors | | 22,059 | | ▲10.13 |
| INC hold | | Swing | ▼0.06 | |

=== Assembly Election 1998 ===
1998 Meghalaya Legislative Assembly election: Rajabala
| Party | Candidate | Votes | % | ±% |
|---|---|---|---|---|
| INC | Kapin Ch. Boro | 6,620 | 41.06% | ▲18.77 |
| UDP | Sayeedullah Nongrum | 6,491 | 40.26% | New |
| Independent | Sisil Marak | 1,037 | 6.43% | New |
| Independent | Clement Marak | 877 | 5.44% | New |
| BJP | Utpol Areng | 546 | 3.39% | ▼21.93 |
| Independent | Lalthantluanga D Shira | 397 | 2.46% | New |
| Independent | Bijeta Daring | 154 | 0.96% | New |
| Margin of victory | | 129 | 0.80% | ▼15.02 |
| Turnout | | 16,122 | 82.04% | ▼7.45 |
| Registered electors | | 20,030 | | ▲16.39 |
| INC gain from Independent | | Swing | ▼0.07 | |

=== Assembly Election 1993 ===
1993 Meghalaya Legislative Assembly election: Rajabala
| Party | Candidate | Votes | % | ±% |
|---|---|---|---|---|
| Independent | Sayeedullah Nongrum | 6,225 | 41.14% | New |
| BJP | Biren Hajong | 3,831 | 25.32% | New |
| INC | Subendra Marak | 3,373 | 22.29% | ▲2.01 |
| Independent | Miriam D. Shira | 1,394 | 9.21% | New |
| HPU | Sisil Marak | 310 | 2.05% | ▼16.21 |
| Margin of victory | | 2,394 | 15.82% | ▲9.42 |
| Turnout | | 15,133 | 89.39% | ▲2.60 |
| Registered electors | | 17,209 | | ▲15.57 |
| Independent hold | | Swing | ▲13.91 | |

=== Assembly Election 1988 ===
1988 Meghalaya Legislative Assembly election: Rajabala
| Party | Candidate | Votes | % | ±% |
|---|---|---|---|---|
| Independent | Miriam D. Shira | 3,459 | 27.22% | New |
| Independent | Sibendra Narayan Koch | 2,646 | 20.82% | New |
| INC | Lokhindor Hajong | 2,577 | 20.28% | ▼10.09 |
| HPU | Shubendra M. Marak | 2,320 | 18.26% | New |
| Independent | Bhadreswar Hajong | 1,239 | 9.75% | New |
| Independent | Monoranjan Roy Hajong | 296 | 2.33% | New |
| Independent | Bimon Sangma | 68 | 0.54% | New |
| Margin of victory | | 813 | 6.40% | ▲0.95 |
| Turnout | | 12,707 | 87.23% | ▲0.78 |
| Registered electors | | 14,891 | | ▲22.22 |
| Independent gain from INC | | Swing | ▼3.15 | |

=== Assembly Election 1983 ===
1983 Meghalaya Legislative Assembly election: Rajabala
| Party | Candidate | Votes | % | ±% |
|---|---|---|---|---|
| INC | Khorsedur Rahman Khan | 3,129 | 30.37% | ▼4.47 |
| Independent | Mozibur Rahman | 2,568 | 24.93% | New |
| HSPDP | Shubendra M. Marak | 1,912 | 18.56% | New |
| Independent | Sibendra Narayan Koch | 1,395 | 13.54% | New |
| APHLC | Monoranjan Hajong | 906 | 8.79% | New |
| Independent | Kshirode Marak | 392 | 3.81% | New |
| Margin of victory | | 561 | 5.45% | ▲5.22 |
| Turnout | | 10,302 | 86.54% | ▲4.23 |
| Registered electors | | 12,184 | | ▲18.53 |
| INC gain from Independent | | Swing | ▼4.70 | |

=== Assembly Election 1978 ===
1978 Meghalaya Legislative Assembly election: Rajabala
| Party | Candidate | Votes | % | ±% |
|---|---|---|---|---|
| Independent | Mozibur Rahman | 2,896 | 35.08% | New |
| INC | Khursedur Khan | 2,877 | 34.85% | New |
| INC(I) | Sibendra Narayan Koch | 1,938 | 23.47% | New |
| Independent | Morison Daring | 545 | 6.60% | New |
| Margin of victory | | 19 | 0.23% | |
| Turnout | | 8,256 | 82.28% | |
| Registered electors | | 10,279 | | |
| Independent win (new seat) | | | | |

== See also ==
- List of constituencies of the Meghalaya Legislative Assembly
- West Garo Hills district
