= Ishqiya (soundtrack) =

Soundtrack album by Vishal Bhardwaj
- Released: 1 January 2010
- Recorded: 2009
- Genre: Feature film soundtrack
- Length: 34:51
- Language: Hindi
- Label: T-Series
- Producer: Hitesh Sonik; Clinton Cerejo

Vishal Bhardwaj chronology
Kaminey (2009)	Ishqiya (2010)	7 Khoon Maaf (2011)

Ishqiya is the soundtrack album to the 2010 film of the same name directed by Abhishek Chaubey and written and produced by Vishal Bhardwaj, starring Vidya Balan, Naseeruddin Shah and Arshad Warsi. Bhardwaj also composed the film's music with lyrics written by Gulzar and Hitesh Sonik and Clinton Cerejo produced the film's soundtrack, with the former also composed the film score. The seven-song soundtrack featured four original compositions and three remixes. The soundtrack was released under the T-Series label on 1 January 2010, coinciding New Year's Day. It received positive reviews from critics and Bhardwaj won his second National Film Award for Best Music Direction, after Godmother (1999).

== Development ==
Chaubey wanted to curate situational numbers that match the film's storyline and themes over chartbuster numbers and wanted them to incorporate it seamlessly into the narrative without disrupting it. His musical approach was derived from his own childhood, where he would listen to ghazals performed by Begum Akhtar, Mehdi Hassan and Ghulam Ali and works of R. D. Burman and S. D. Burman.

The song "Dil Toh Bachcha Hai Ji", according to Chaubey, was "like something Manna Dey would have sung, way back in the 1950s". Chaubey had an Eastern European musical palette that emphasized on accordion, to which Bharadwaj composed the tune on his harmonium, set to dummy lyrics that went "Hum toh umro hi umro mein badhte rahe" (transl. We just kept growing with age). Chaubey and Bharadwaj sent the tune to Gulzar, and referenced the lyrical precedent "Abhi Toh Main Jawan Hoon" from Afsana (1951). When Gulzar listened to the reference, he immediately said "Dil Toh Bachcha Hai Ji" (transl. The heart is childish). The director and composer found that they got the hook line which was easy to be remembered.

"Ibn-E-Batuta" performed by Sukhwinder Singh and Mika Singh was described as a classic ode to male bonding, where the uncle and his nephew go on a fun journey. The song accompanied the catchy and peppy situation which Chaubey found it to be instantly successful and also thought "Dil Toh Bachcha Hai Ji" would have a small following due to its slower tempo and unconventional lyrics. But the latter was also an instant success, which Chaubey described it as "gob-smackingly beautiful". After the film's release, the song "Ibn-E-Batuta" was accused of plagiarism, despite that itself being an improvisation of the poem written by Sarveshwar Dayal Saxena.

== Reception ==
Ruchika Kher of Indo-Asian News Service rated the soundtrack three-and-a-half out of five stars, calling it as "a commendable job by the composer, who believes in experimentation and brings out something fresh always." Devesh Sharma of Filmfare rated four out of five and summarized "The album can only be spoken in superlatives. Don’t miss it for the world." Vipin Nair of Music Aloud rated 7.5 out of 10 stating "Ishqiya once again demonstrates the class act that Vishal Bharadwaj is." Karthik Srinivasan of Milliblog wrote "Usual musical treat from Vishal barring that niggling Memories quibble." A critic from News18 wrote "Vishal Bhardwaj's musical score has his unmistakable stamp all over. The songs, Ibn-e-Batuta and Dil To Bachcha Hai Ji are obviously the best picks of the album. One may be surprised to note the tune of Dil To Bachcha Hai Ji has an uncanny resemblance to Raj Kapoor's Jeena Yahan, Marna Yahan from Mera Naam Joker." Raja Sen of Rediff.com described it as the best Bollywood soundtracks of 2010 and summarized "Bhardwaj totally takes a backseat and lets the words do the talking, so to speak."

== Track listing ==
All lyrics are written by Gulzar; all music is composed by Vishal Bhardwaj.

Ishqiya (Original Motion Picture Soundtrack) track listing
No.	Title	Singer(s)	Length
1.	"Dil To Bachcha Hai Ji"	Rahat Fateh Ali Khan	5:38
2.	"Ibn-E-Batuta"	Sukhwinder Singh, Mika Singh	3:42
3.	"Ab Mujhe Koi"	Rekha Bhardwaj	5:45
4.	"Badi Dheere Jali"	Rekha Bhardwaj	7:06
5.	"Dil To Bachcha Hai" (Remix by Clinton Cerejo)	Rahat Fateh Ali Khan	4:03
6.	"Ibn-E-Batuta" (Remix by Nucleya)	Sukhwinder Singh, Mika Singh	4:22
7.	"Ibn-E-Batuta" (Remix by Jackie V)	Sukhwinder Singh, Mika Singh	4:15
Total length:			34:51

== Accolades ==
Accolades for Ishqiya (Original Motion Picture Soundtrack)
Award	Date of ceremony (Note: Date is linked to the article about the awards held that year, wherever possible.)	Category	Recipient(s)	Result	Ref.
BIG Star Entertainment Awards	21 December 2010	Most Entertaining Music	Vishal Bhardwaj	Nominated	
BIG Star Entertainment Awards	21 December 2010	Most Entertaining Singer – Male	Rahat Fateh Ali Khan ("Dil Toh Bachcha Hai Ji")	Nominated	
Filmfare Awards	29 January 2011	Best Music Director	Vishal Bhardwaj	Nominated	
Filmfare Awards	29 January 2011	Best Lyricist	Gulzar ("Dil Toh Bachcha Hai Ji")	Won	
Filmfare Awards	29 January 2011	Best Male Playback Singer	Rahat Fateh Ali Khan ("Dil Toh Bachcha Hai Ji")	Won	
International Indian Film Academy Awards	23–25 June 2011	Best Music Director	Vishal Bhardwaj	Nominated	
International Indian Film Academy Awards	23–25 June 2011	Best Lyricist	Gulzar ("Dil Toh Bachcha Hai Ji")	Nominated	
International Indian Film Academy Awards	23–25 June 2011	Best Male Playback Singer	Rahat Fateh Ali Khan ("Dil Toh Bachcha Hai Ji")	Nominated	
International Indian Film Academy Awards	23–25 June 2011	Best Female Playback Singer	Rekha Bhardwaj ("Ab Mujhey Koi")	Nominated	
Mirchi Music Awards	27 January 2011	Album of The Year	—	Nominated	
Mirchi Music Awards	27 January 2011	Music Composer of The Year	Vishal Bhardwaj ("Dil Toh Bachcha Hai Ji")	Nominated	
Mirchi Music Awards	27 January 2011	Lyricist of The Year	Gulzar ("Dil Toh Bachcha Hai Ji")	Won	
Mirchi Music Awards	27 January 2011	Raag-Inspired Song of the Year	"Badi Dheere Jali"	Nominated	
Mirchi Music Awards	27 January 2011	Best Programmer & Arranger of the Year	Hitesh Sonik and Clinton Cerejo ("Dil To Bachcha Hai")	Nominated	
Mirchi Music Awards	27 January 2011	Best Song Recording	Salman Khan Afridi and Farhad K Dadyburjor ("Dil To Bachcha Hai")	Won	
National Film Awards	9 September 2011	Best Music Direction	Vishal Bhardwaj	Won	
National Film Awards	9 September 2011	Best Female Playback Singer	Rekha Bhardwaj ("Badi Dheere Jali")	Won	
Producers Guild Film Awards	11 January 2011	Best Music Director	Vishal Bhardwaj	Nominated	
Producers Guild Film Awards	11 January 2011	Best Lyricist	Gulzar ("Dil Toh Bachcha Hai Ji")	Won	
Producers Guild Film Awards	11 January 2011	Best Male Playback Singer	Rahat Fateh Ali Khan ("Dil Toh Bachcha Hai Ji")	Nominated	
Screen Awards	6 January 2011	Best Music Director	Vishal Bhardwaj	Nominated	
Screen Awards	6 January 2011	Best Background Music	Vishal Bhardwaj	Nominated	
Screen Awards	6 January 2011	Best Lyricist	Gulzar ("Dil Toh Bachcha Hai Ji")	Won	
Screen Awards	6 January 2011	Best Lyricist	Gulzar ("Ibn-e-batuta")	Nominated	
Screen Awards	6 January 2011	Best Male Playback	Rahat Fateh Ali Khan ("Dil Toh Bachcha Hai Ji")	Won	
Screen Awards	6 January 2011	Best Female Playback	Rekha Bhardwaj ("Ab Mujhe Koi" and "Badi Dheere Jali")	Nominated	
Zee Cine Awards	14 January 2011	Best Lyricist	Gulzaar ("Dil To Bachcha Hai Ji")	Won	
Zee Cine Awards	14 January 2011	Best Track of the Year	"Dil To Bachcha Hai Ji"	Nominated	
