= Rahmane =

Rahmane is both a given name and surname. Notable people with the name include:

- Aboubakar Abdel Rahmane (died 1979), Chadian warlord
- Rahmane Barry (born 1986), Senegalese footballer

== See also ==
- Rahman (name)
