= Matiur Rahman =

Matiur Rahman or Motiur Rahman (Arabic: مطيع الرحمن) is a South Asian masculine given name of Arabic origin. It is composed of the elements Muti' , al- and Rahman meaning obedient to the Most Gracious. It may refer to:

- M. Matiur Rahman (1923–2018), Bangladeshi minister and politician from Pirojpur
- Motiur Rahman (Gazipur politician) (1926–2014) Bangladeshi politician from Gazipur
- Matiur Rahman (politician, born 1933) (1933–2003), Bangladeshi minister and politician from Rangpur
- Matiur Rahman (officer, born 1941) (1941–1971), Bangladesh Air Force officer and freedom fighter
- Matiur Rahman (officer, born 1950) (1950-1981), Bangladesh Army officer and freedom fighter
- S. M. Matiur Rahman (born 1965), Bangladesh Army officer and general
- Motiur Rahman (politician, born 1942) (1942–2023), Bangladesh Awami League politician, Minister of Religious Affairs (2014–2018)
- Motiur Rahman Nizami (1943–2016), Bangladeshi politician
- Matiur Rahman (born 1946), Bangladeshi journalist and newspaper editor
- Mohammad Matiur Rahman (Tangail politician) (1947–2012), Bangladeshi politician and cardiac surgeon
- Motiur Rohman Mondal (born 1949), Indian politician and physician
- Motiur Rahman (Indian politician) (1949–2007), Indian politician
- Motiur Rahman Mollik (1950–2010), Bangladeshi poet
- Matiur Rahman Mallik (1953–1969), Bengali activist
- Matiur Rehman (born 1977), Pakistani militant, suspected to be an al Qaeda leader
- Motiur Rahman Munna (born 1979), Bangladeshi footballer
- Mati-ur-Rehman (born 1984), Pakistani weightlifter
- Matiur Rahman Mallik (died 1969), Bangladeshi student killed on Mass Upsurge Day
- A.S.M. Matiur Rahman, Bangladesh Army officer and physician
- Md. Motiur Rahman, Bangladeshi politician from Kurigram
- Md. Matiur Rahman (Sunamganj politician), Bangladeshi politician from Sunamganj
- Matiur Rahman Chowdhury, Bangladeshi journalist
- Matiar Rahman Chowdhury, Bangladeshi politician from Rangpur
- M. Motiur Rahman Talukdar, Bangladeshi politician
- Md. Motiar Rahman, Bangladeshi politician and businessman
- Motiar Rahman, Bangladeshi politician

== See also ==
- Birshresthho Matiur Rahman Stadium
