= As'ad ibn Zurara =

Companion of Muhammad (died 623)

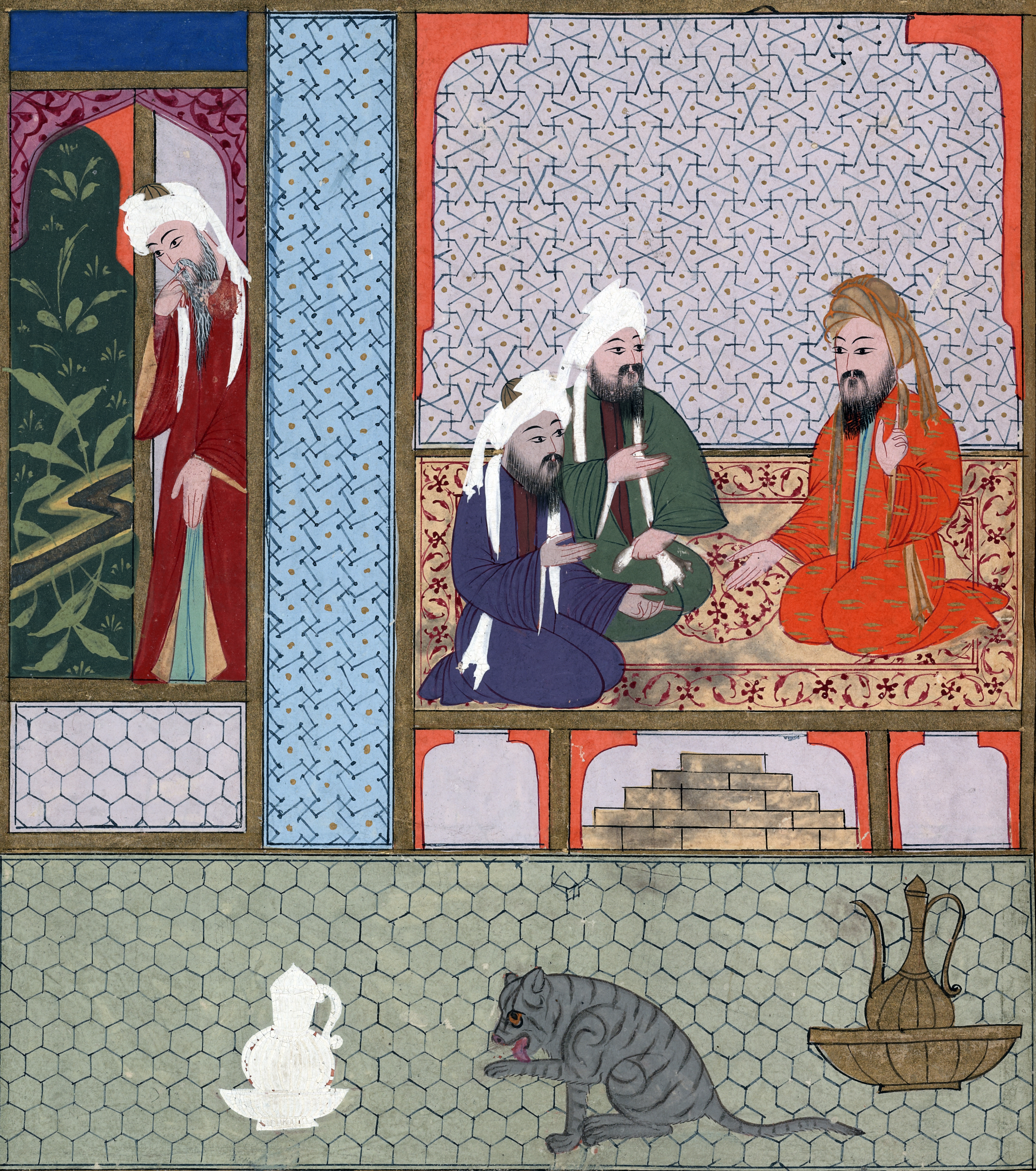
Islamic miniature depicting Abu Hudhayfa ibn Utba (right) telling As'ad ibn Zurara he has become a Muslim, his house is depicted as clean (ritually and practically) and inhabited by a cat a visual shorthand for Islam.

Asʿad ibn Zurāra (Arabic: أسعد بن زرارة) (died 623), often known by his kunya Abū Umāma, was a companion of the Islamic prophet Muhammad and the first chief in Medina to become a Muslim.

== Family ==
As'ad was the son of Zurara ibn Udas and Suwad (al-Furaya) bint Rafi, both of the Malik branch of the Najjar clan of the Khazraj tribe in Medina. He had a brother, Saad, and two sisters, al-Faria and Ruwayba. Saad ibn Muadh, an important chief of the Aws tribe, was their maternal first cousin.

He married Amira (Umayra) bint Sahl, also from the Malik ibn Najjar clan, and they had three daughters: al-Furaya, Habiba and Kabsha. By 620 he had become the leader of the Najjar clan.

== Conversion to Islam ==
Medina was a divided city. The Khazraj and Aws tribes fought each other and also raided the Jews. The Jews warned the polytheists: "A prophet will be sent soon. His day is at hand. We shall follow him and kill you by his aid as Ad and Iram perished."

In 620 As'ad had a legal dispute with Dhakwan ibn Abd Qays. During the pilgrimage season that summer, they both travelled to Mecca, hoping that Utba ibn Rabia could settle it for them. Utba told them about Muhammad, "who believes he is a messenger of God." Muhammad was at that time looking for military allies against the Quraysh. He offered himself as a prophet to any tribe that would listen. Dhakwan, who knew of As'ad's monotheism, told him, "Leave him; this is your creed!"

Together with five friends, As'ad met up with Muhammad just outside Mecca. On hearing that they were of the Khazraj tribe, Muhammad asked if they were allies of the Jews. They said they were, so he invited them to sit with him. He explained Islam to them and recited the Qur'an. When they heard Muhammad's message they said one to another: "This is the very prophet of whom the Jews warned us. Don't let them get to him before we do!" As'ad was the first to accept Muhammad's teachings and become a Muslim, and his five friends followed. Muhammad asked them to support him in bringing his message to his people. They told him, "No tribe is so divided by hatred and rancour as ours. Perhaps God will unite them through you. So let us go to them and invite them to this religion of yours; and if God unites them in it, then no man will be mightier than you."

They returned to Medina as the city's first Muslims. As'ad broke his clan's idols. They told their people about Islam, and the news spread around Medina until Muhammad had been mentioned in every home.

== Mission in Mecca ==
=== First Aqaba ===
In the summer of 621 As'ad brought eleven friends to the trade-fair, and they met Muhammad at al-Aqaba. There they gave him the Pledge of Women: although they pledged allegiance to Muhammad, there was no mention of war.

When they returned to Medina, Muhammad sent Musab ibn Umayr with them. Musab lodged in As'ad's house. As'ad built a mosque on the property of two wards of his clan, close to the location of the future mosque built by Muhammad. He gathered forty men together, and they met to hear Musab read the Quran to them, teach them about Islam and lead the prayers.

As'ad took Musab out to the Abdul-Ashhal and Zafar clans teach more people about Islam. This annoyed his cousin, Saad ibn Muadh, who was chief of the Abdul-Ashhal clan. One day Saad challenged As'ad as a group of Muslims were sitting comfortably in a garden. Musab explained Islam to Saad, and he was converted. This resulted in the conversion of Saad's whole clan.

As'ad and Musab continued calling people to Islam until nearly every family included some Muslims.

=== Second Aqaba ===
In June 622 a large party of Medinans went to Mecca for the trade-fair. They included As'ad, Musab and 74 other Muslims. The Muslims left camp in the middle of the night to meet Muhammad secretly at al-Aqaba. Muhammad invited them to make a second pledge of allegiance to him "as you would to your women and children."

According to the Najjar clan, As'ad was the first to strike his hand in fealty; but the Abdul-Ashhal clan said that it was Abu'l-Haytham and the Jusham clan said it was al-Baraa ibn Maarur. As As'ad took Muhammad's hand, he said: "People, do you know on what basis you give allegiance to Muhammad? You give allegiance to him on the basis of fighting the Arabs and non-Arabs, jinn and men." The Medinans replied, "We will fight those who fight and make peace with those who make peace." Muhammad said, "Give allegiance on the basis that you bear witness that there is no god but Allah and that I am Allah's Messenger; establish the prayer and pay alms; hear and obey. Do not contend the business of his family and deny me what you deny yourselves and your people." They all agreed.

Muhammad selected twelve men to be leaders of the Muslim community in Medina, "sureties for your people just as the disciples of Jesus son of Mary were responsible to him, while I am responsible for my people." As'ad was among the twelve.

=== The Hijrah ===
Musab returned to Mecca so that he would formally qualify as an Immigrant. While he was away, As'ad led the prayers at the mosque five times a day.

The Muslims from Mecca began to arrive in Medina, where they lodged as guests in the homes of the Medinan converts. It is variously claimed that Talha ibn Ubaydallah and Hamza ibn Abdul-Muttalib stayed at As'ad's house.

== Death ==
In spring 623 As'ad suffered from an illness, similar to diphtheria or meningitis, that entailed a rattling in his throat. Muhammad visited him in his sickness, exclaiming, "This is an evil death! The Jews say there is no defence against it." He advised As'ad to be cauterised. He was burned twice in the medial arm vein and twice on his throat, "and his neck was encircled with the cauterisation."

As'ad died within days, at the beginning of Shawwal, i.e., in April 623.

Muhammad attended his ritual washing and had him shrouded in three garments; he walked in front of the bier and conducted the funeral prayers. As'ad was said to be the first man buried at Al-Baqi'. Muhammad considered As'ad's death a grave misfortune. He worried that the Jews and the hypocrites would say that God would not have allowed the friend of a true prophet to die, but "I have no power from God for myself or my friend."

As'ad left his mother, three daughters, an aunt and some gold and pearl jewellery in the care of Muhammad. As'ad's womenfolk lived as Muhammad's dependants among his wives, such as his granddaughter Amrah bint Abdul Rahman who was raised by Aisha. Muhammad later arranged marriages for As'ad's daughters.

Since As'ad had not left any sons, the Najjar asked Muhammad to appoint a new leader for their clan. Muhammad replied, "You are my maternal uncles, and we belong together, so I will be your leader." The Najjar were pleased to have Muhammad as their new chief.

== See also ==
- List of Sahabah
