= Lutfur Rahman =

Lutfur Rahman (Arabic: لطف الرحمن, lit. 'Kindness of the Most Merciful') is a South Asian Muslim male given name of Arabic origin. Notable bearers of the name include

- Sheikh Lutfar Rahman (1881–1975), Bangladeshi record-keeper
- Mohammad Lutfur Rahman (1889–1936), Bengali author
- Lutfar Rahman Sarkar (1930–2013), Bangladeshi economist
- Lutfur Rahman (poet) (born 1941), Indian poet
- Muhammad Lutfar Rahman (born 1942), vice-chancellor of Islamic University, Bangladesh
- Lutfur Rahman Khan, Bangladeshi politician
- Lutfur Rahman Kajal (born 1960), Bangladeshi politician
- Lutfor Rahman (born 1962), Bangladeshi physician
- Lutfur Rahman George (born 1963), Bangladeshi actor
- Lutfur Rahman (British politician) (born 1965), British-Bangladeshi mayor
- Lutfur Rehman (politician) (born 1968), Pakistani Islamic scholar and politician
- Lutfor Rahman Riton, Bangladeshi writer of children's literature
- Lutfur Rahman (Bangladeshi politician), Bangladeshi politician
- Lutfar Rahman Farooq, Bangladeshi politician
- Lutfar Rahman Chowdhury, Bangladeshi politician
- Lutfar Rahman Biswas, Bangladeshi politician

== See also ==
- Zafar Muhammad Lutfar, Bangladeshi politician
- Latifur Rahman (disambiguation), a different name
- Rahman (name)#Second half of compound name
