= Ateeq =

Ateeq is a given name and a surname. Notable people with the name include:

== First name ==
- Ateeq Hussain Khan (born 1980), Indian musical artist
- Ateeq Javid (born 1991), English cricketer

== Middle name ==
- Hazza Ali Hazza Ateeq Mubarak (born 1995), Bahraini professional footballer
- Mohammed Ateeq Al-Falahi, secretary general of the Red Crescent Society of the United Arab Emirates
- Muhammad Ateeq Shaikh, Pakistani politician
- Rana Ahmed Ateeq Anwar, Pakistani politician

== Surname ==
- Bushra Ateeq, Indian scientist
- Fahad al-Ateeq, Saudi story writer and novelist
- Saad al-Ateeq (born 1969), Islamic preacher and religious scholar
- Sarwat Ateeq (born 1949), Pakistani actress

== See also ==
- Atiqur Rahman (disambiguation)
