= Sayeedullah Nongrum =

Meghalaya politician

Member of Meghalaya Legislative Assembly
- In office 2003–2013
- Preceded by: Kapin Ch. Boro
- Succeeded by: Ashahel D. Shira
- Constituency: Rajabala
- In office 1993–1998
- Preceded by: Miriam D. Shira
- Succeeded by: Kapin Ch. Boro

Personal details
- Born: November 25, 1945 (age 80) Shillong, Meghalaya
- Party: Indian National Congress

Sayeedullah Nongrum is an Indian politician and philanthropist. He was a three-time MLA for the Rajabala constituency in the Meghalaya Legislative Assembly.

== Early life and education ==
Sayeedullah was born on 25 November 1945 to a Sunni Muslim Khasi family in Meghalaya. His father was S.K. Abdullah. He began his studies in Shillong, completing his matriculation from the city's Islamia High School in 1960. He graduated from Gauhati University in 1964, and completed a Master of Arts degree in Urdu in 1969.

== Career ==
=== Professional and educational work ===
Nongrum began his working life in 1967 as a time scale clerk in the Department of Telecommunications. He later served as a Public Relations Officer before retiring in 1992 to focus on social and political work.

He played a key role in Muslim educational and institutional development in Meghalaya. He served as president of the Shillong Muslim Panchayat and as secretary of the Meghalaya Board of Wakf.

Nongrum helped found several educational institutions including Qazi & Jaman College in Bhaitbari (1990), Jinjiram College in Rajabala (2000) and was the founding vice-president of the governing body of Umshyrpi College in Shillong.

=== Political career ===
Nongrum entered electoral politics in the 1993 Meghalaya Legislative Assembly election, winning the Rajabala seat as an independent candidate.

Despite contesting against candidates from established parties, he defeated Bharatiya Janata Party candidate Biren Hajong in the election.

He was defeated in the 1998 Meghalaya Legislative Assembly election by Indian National Congress candidate Kapin Ch. Boro. He returned to the Assembly in the 2003 Meghalaya Legislative Assembly election, defeating Clement Marak of the Nationalist Congress Party, and retained the seat in the 2008 Meghalaya Legislative Assembly election as a Congress candidate.

He was defeated in the 2013 Meghalaya Legislative Assembly election.

At the 2018 Meghalaya Legislative Assembly election, Nongrum contested from the Tikrikilla constituency as an independent candidate but was unsuccessful. A by-election was held in April 2019 for the Selsella constituency, in which Nongrum contested as a United Democratic Party candidate but did not win the election.

He has also held administrative positions, including Chairman of the Meghalaya Industrial Development Corporation and Chairman of the Meghalaya Land Revenue Review Committee and has also acted as co-ordinator of the Assam–Meghalaya Boundary Settlement Committee. In May 2009, he was appointed Political Secretary to the Chief Minister of Meghalaya with Cabinet rank.

=== Community leadership and interfaith work ===
Since 1982, Nongrum has served as General Secretary of the Shillong Muslim Union (SMU). Under his leadership, the SMU helped develop the Madina Masjid in Shillong, described as a glass mosque with educational and welfare facilities. Nongrum is also a founder member of the Shillong All Faith Forum, which promotes communal harmony and cooperation among religious communities.

== Personal life ==
Nongrum is married to Fatima Beum Dkhar (formerly Florabell Dkhar) and they have two sons and two daughters. He is also a polyglot; fluent in Khasi, English, Bengali, Urdu, Hindi, Persian, Tamil, Nepali and Assamese.
