= Azad Zaman =

Indian Bengali politician (died 2021)

Dr. Azad Zaman
- আজাদ জামান

Member of Meghalaya Legislative Assembly
- In office 2018 – 4 March 2021
- Preceded by: Ashahel D Shira
- Succeeded by: Muhammad Abdus Saleh
- Constituency: Rajabala

Personal details
- Born: 1973/1974
- Died: March 4, 2021 (aged 47–48)
- Party: Indian National Congress

Dr. Azad Zaman (Bengali: আজাদ জামান; 1973/1974 – 4 March 2021) was an Indian Bengali politician, doctor and social worker. He was a former member of the Meghalaya Legislative Assembly for the Rajabala constituency in West Garo Hills district.

== Life ==
Azad Zaman was born in 1974, to a Bengali Muslim family in Meghalaya. He was the son of Alhaj Surat Zaman. He was a medical practitioner who later joined government service. His wife is a teacher by profession, and they lived in Bowabari, PO New Bhaitbari, PS Phulbari in the West Garo Hills.

He competed in the 2013 Meghalaya Legislative Assembly election as an independent politician for Rajabala but lost to Ashahel Shira. He later joined the Indian National Congress party, and defeated Shira in the 2018 Meghalaya Legislative Assembly election.

== Death ==
He died on 4 March 2021, due to cardiac arrest, aged 47. He left behind a wife, two daughters and a son.
