= Mizanur Rahman (police officer) =

Bangladeshi police officer

Mizanur Rahman is a former deputy inspector general Bangladesh police and Additional Commissioner of Dhaka Metropolitan Police. He was involved in a notable bribery scandal. He was convicted and sentenced to three years imprisonment in a bribery case. He was accused of forcefully abducting a woman and marrying her against her will.

== Early life ==
Rahman is from Gopalganj District.

== Career ==
Rahman was denied promotions and important postings during the 2001 to 2006 Bangladesh Nationalist Party rule because he was from Gopalganj District. The government descriminated against religious minorities, people from Faridpur District and Gopalganj as they were perceived as being loyal to the opposition Awami League. He was stationed at the Police Training Centre, Noakhali. He also served at the Laxmipur Police Circle and Rajbari Sadar Upazila.

Rahman was an additional Superintendent of Police in Chuadanga District and Comilla District. After which he was posted at the Police Training Center, Rangpur. He was then posted at the Police Telecom Training School. He served in the Armed Police Battalion in Barbunia, Rangamati. He was promoted to Superintendent of Police in charge of telecom.

In 2008, Rahman was the sports secretary of the Bangladesh Police Service Association.

Rahman was accused of attempting to kidnap a female journalist in December 2017. The kidnapping was prevented as locals stopped the car upon hearing the screams of the reporter.

Rahman was withdrawn from Dhaka Metropolitan Police, where he was the Additional Commissioner, on 9 January 2018 after reports of him forcefully marrying a woman came to light and was attached to Directorate of Police. Asaduzzaman Khan, Minister of Home Affairs, announced an investigation into the allegations against Rahman. He allegedly picked up the 25-year-old woman from Panthapath and married her against her wishes as his second wife. He had the woman arrested after accusing her of ransacking his apartment. He also threatened to kill a journalist of Jamuna Television for reporting against him. Dhaka Union of Journalists and Crime Reporters' Association of Bangladesh protested his threats. He apologized for threatening the reporter. His first wife was in Canada. Rahman tried to pay 4 million taka to an investigator of Anti-Corruption Commission, Director Khandaker Enamul Basir, to stop a corruption investigation against him. Bangladesh Police formed a three-member investigation committee led by Mainur Rahman Chowdhury, the Additional Inspector General of Police.

On 6 June 2019, Rahman was sued under the Prevention of Money Laundering Act, 2012 with the Anti-Corruption Commission investigator Khandaker Enamul Basir. On 24 June, the Anti-Corruption Commission sued Rahman, his wife, nephew, and brother. Bangladesh High Court rejected his anticipator bail on 1 June. Judge KM Emrul Kayesh rejected in bail application in July. He skipped a meeting with the Anti-Corruption Commission. On 20 June, court ordered the seizure of his assets.

On 9 February 2020, Judge KM Imrul Qayesh accepted the charge sheet against Rahman. In October, the trial against him and three members of his family started.

Justice Sheikh Nazmul Alam sentenced Rahman on 23 February 2022 to three years imprisonment. He was convicted of trying to bribe Basir sentenced and Basir was sentenced to eight years imprisonment in a corruption case. On 13 April, Rahman was granted bail by Bangladesh High Court Justice Mostafizur Rahman in the bribery of the investigator of the Anti-Corruption Commission case but could not be released due to the pending corruption case against him. Justice Md Mostafizur Rahman also accepted an appeal from Rahman seeking the squashing of his conviction. He bail was upheld by Bangladesh Supreme Court on 19 April. Bangladesh High Court rejected his bail petition in the other corruption case on 26 April. On 3 November 2022, the Government of Bangladesh announced Rahman had been terminated from the police force effective from the date of the High Court verdict under the Public Service Act, 2018.
