= Mahbubul Alam (businessman) =

Bangladeshi business leader

- মাহবুবুল আলম

President of the Federation of Bangladesh Chambers of Commerce and Industry
- In office August 2023 – August 2024

Personal details
- Occupation: Business executive

Mahbubul Alam is a Bangladeshi business executive and former president of the Federation of Bangladesh Chambers of Commerce and Industry (FBCCI). He has also served as president of the Chittagong Chamber of Commerce & Industry.

== Early life ==
Alam hails from Gohira village, Raozan Upazila, Chittagong District. He studied at the University of Chittagong.

== Career ==
Alam is the chairperson of M Alam Group, headquartered in Khatunganj.

Alam has been involved in trade and chamber politics for many years. He previously served several terms as president of the Khatunganj Trade Association. He had served as the senior vice-president and vice-president of the Chittagong Chamber of Commerce and Industry.

In July 2023, several former FBCCI presidents, including incumbent Md. Jashim Uddin and Salman F Rahman, publicly endorsed Alam as the next president of the organisation ahead of the 2023–2025 election, describing him as a suitable candidate for the post.

Alam served as president of the Chittagong Chamber of Commerce & Industry. In August 2023, he was elected unopposed as president of the Federation of Bangladesh Chambers of Commerce and Industry for the 2023–2025 term as a candidate of the Sammilito Oikko Parishad. He succeeded Md. Jashim Uddin as president. He had secured the government's approval before taking office. He met Prime Minister Sheikh Hasina after being elected president.

Alam was made chairman of the Business Initiative Leading Development (BUILD) in February 2024.

On 22 August 2024, Alam met with the Bangladesh Army chief, General Waker-Uz-Zaman, and requested protection from extortionists. He met Lieutenant General (retired) Jahangir Alam Chowdhury, advisor in charge of the Ministry of Home Affairs in the Yunus Ministry.

In September 2024, Alam resigned as president of the FBCCI amid mounting pressure from sections of the business community following the political transition after the August uprising that led to the fall of the Sheikh Hasina-led Awami League government. He sent an email from Singapore tendering his resignation, where he had been staying for treatment. Following his resignation, the interim government appointed Muhammad Hafizur Rahman as administrator of the organisation with a mandate to organise elections within 120 days and transfer authority to an elected committee.

In December 2024, Rapid Action Battalion-7 led by Lieutenant Colonel Mahabubul Alam and the Anti-Corruption Commission conducted a joint raid at Alam's residence in Sugandha Residential Area, Chittagong following allegations that illegal foreign currency was being kept there. Authorities reported that no such currency was recovered during the operation.

== Personal life ==
Mahbubul Alam has four daughters. Alam's eldest daughter is Dr Munal Mahbub who is the senior vice-president of Chittagong Women Chamber of Commerce and Industry. His third daughter Barrister Remura Mahbub is serving as a partner of an International law firm named Tahmidur Remura Wahid TRW Law Firm.
