= Balrampur gang rape =

Gang rape incident in India

- Balrampur gang rape (Uttar Pradesh)
- Location: 27.43°N 82.18°E; Balrampur, Uttar Pradesh, India
- Date: 29 September 2020
- Attack type: Rape & Physical assault
- Deaths: 1
- No. of participants: 2
- Accused: Shahid and Sahil
- Charges: gang rape

On 29 September 2020, a 22-year-old Dalit college girl was gang-raped and assaulted in Balrampur, Uttar Pradesh, India and she died on way to the hospital. Her family says that she was abducted on her way back home and raped by at least two Muslim men, Shahid and Sahil. Postmortem report suggests she was badly tortured even after the rape. The postmortem report said there were at least ten antemortem injuries on her body: eight contusion wounds on her cheek, chest, elbows and left thigh; and two abrasions on her left leg and knee. The two men accused were arrested by UP police, and the Uttar Pradesh government has offered financial assistance to the victim's family.

== Incident and arrests ==
The incident took place on the evening of Tuesday, 29 September 2020, when the victim, a second year B Com student, was returning home. Her mother told reporters that the woman went to get her admission at 10 am, and on her way back, a few men forcibly put her in their car, injected her with sedatives and raped her. They broke her legs and sent her back in a rickshaw.

The girl returned home in serious condition, prompting her parents to rush her to a nearby hospital, but she died on the way, and the matter was reported to the police from the hospital. According to the Balrampur Superintendent of Police Dev Ranjan Verma, "the police acted upon the parent's complaint, and identified the accused as Shahid and Sahil and arrested them".

== Cremation ==
The woman was cremated on the night of Wednesday, 30 September 2020 in the presence of her family members and UP Police.

== See also ==
- 2020 Hathras gang rape and murder
