= Ishk =

Ishk may refer to:

- Institute for the Study of Human Knowledge, the educational charity founded by the psychologist Robert E. Ornstein in Los Altos, California, US
- Ishkashimi language, the language spoken in Afghanistan and Tajikistan
- Ichthyological Society of Hong Kong, an organization for the professional analysis about ichthyological-based biodiversity and the fish-related knowledge education in Hong Kong
- Island School Hong Kong, a secondary school

== See also ==
- Ishq (disambiguation)
- Ishk Ishk Ishk, a 1974 Indian film by Dev Anand
