= Ashiqur Rahman =

Ashiqur Rahman is a Bengali masculine given name of Arabic origin. Notable bearers of the name include

- H. N. Ashequr Rahman (born 1941), Bangladesh Awami League treasurer and politician
- Ashiqur Rahman (cricketer, born 1983), Bangladeshi cricketer and coach
- Asikur Rahuman, Sri Lankan footballer
- Ashiqur Rahman (cricketer, born 2005), Bangladeshi cricketer
- Ashiqur Rahman (director), Bangladeshi television director, film maker, and screenwriter

== See also ==
- Aashiq
- Rahman (name)
