= Abdus Saleh =

Indian politician

Md. Abdus Saleh

Member of Meghalaya Legislative Assembly
- In office 1997–2003
- Preceded by: Lok Kindor Hajong
- Succeeded by: Nidhu Ram Hajong
- Constituency: Mahendraganj
- In office 2008–2013
- Preceded by: Nidhu Ram Hajong
- Succeeded by: Dikkanchi D. Shira
- Constituency: Mahendraganj
- In office 2021–2023
- Preceded by: Azad Zaman
- Succeeded by: Mizanur Rahman Kazi
- Constituency: Rajabala

Personal details
- Born: 1968 (age 57–58) Meghalaya
- Party: National People's Party (present)
- Relatives: Wife- Sultana Atifa, and 2 daughters
- Education: St. Edmund's College

Md. Abdus Saleh (Bengali: মুহাম্মদ আব্দুস সালেহ) is an Indian politician and social worker from Meghalaya. He was the former MLA of Rajabala and former three-time MLA of Mahendraganj in the Meghalaya Legislative Assembly.

== Early life and education ==
Saleh was born into a Bengali Muslim family in the plains region of the West Garo Hills district of Meghalaya to Abdul Gofur, a social worker and political leader of Mahendraganj, and Sahara Begum. Abdul Gafur, who was a close associate of Purno A. Sangma, died due to cardiac arrest while at a meeting with Purno A. Sangma in 1983.

Saleh graduated from St. Edmund's College (affiliated with North-Eastern Hill University) in 1989 with a Bachelor of Arts degree.

In 1999, Abdus Saleh married Sultana Atifa, with whom he has two daughters.

== Career ==
Saleh began his political career in the 1997 Meghalaya Legislative Assembly by-election where he won as an independent candidate. In 1998 he contested and was elected as an Indian National Congress candidate for the Mahendraganj constituency. He was unsuccessful as an independent candidate during the 2003 Meghalaya Legislative Assembly election. He rejoined the Congress party for the 2008 Meghalaya Legislative Assembly election and was elected once again.

After the reservation of the Mahendraganj Constituency, Saleh ran for the Rajabala constituency in 2013, but was unsuccessful in both the 2013 and 2018 Meghalaya Legislative Assembly elections, in both of which he stood as an Independent candidate. The sudden demise of Dr. Azad Zaman necessitated a by-election for the Rajabala seat, which was held at the end of October 2021. Abdus Saleh, competing as the National People's Party candidate was successfully elected.

In a historical feat, Saleh has become the only person in Meghalaya to have won two separate by-elections, from two separate constituencies, almost 25 years apart.

Saleh has held important portfolios of the Meghalaya Government. He was the Minister of State in charge of Finance, Agriculture and Health under the leadership of E. K. Mawlong in 2001. He was the Minister of State in charge of Power and PHC in 2002 under the leadership of Dr. F. W. Khonglam. Under Mukul Sangma's leadership, Saleh was the Parliamentary Secretary of Home, Transport and Taxation from 2009 to 2013. He has also served as the Chairman of Meghalaya Government Construction Corporation since 1999, and the co-chairman of the Meghalaya Industrial Development Corporation since 2014. He was also Chairman of Minorities in 3 Meghalaya Pradesh Congress Committee, and the Chairman of the Meghalaya State Waqf Board.

Currently, Abdus Saleh is serving as the Chairman of the Meghalaya State Planning Board under the leadership of Conrad K. Sangma.
