= Ashik Punchoo =

Mauritian footballer

Personal information
- Full name: Ashik Punchoo
- Date of birth: 8 November 1976 (age 49)
- Place of birth: Mauritius
- Position: Defender

Senior career*
Years	Team	Apps	(Gls)
2000–2010	Faucon Flacq SC	?	(?)

International career
2001–2004	Mauritius	14	(0)
- * Club domestic league appearances and goals

Ashik Punchoo (born 8 November 1976) is a Mauritian former international footballer who played as a defender. He won 14 caps for the Mauritius national football team between 2001 and 2004.
