= Mizan (musician) =

Ethiopian singer

Mizan K.
- Genres: Electronic; blues
- Occupations: Musician; producer; videographer; performer
- Instrument(s): keyboards, vocals, synth
- Years active: 2010–present
- Website: mizan.world

Mizan K., known professionally as Mizan, is an Ethiopian singer, songwriter, videographer and producer. Following a series of singles, she self-released her debut EP, Dark Blue in November 2015, which garnered attention for its minimalistic musical and performance style.

== Early life and education ==
Mizan was raised in Addis Ababa, Ethiopia and attended a higher music institution at a young age where she studied piano. At home, her family collected Ethiopian-pop tapes, Soul, and Motown records, including works of Aster Aweke, Ella Fitzgerald, Bizunesh Bekele, Tilahun Gessesse, and Bettye Swann. She learned to compose lyrics, poetry, and experimented with creating lo-fi productions, and performed regularly for friends and in talent shows during her time in high school. Mizan moved to the United States to study literature. She moved to New York City in 2013.

== Career ==
=== Dark Blue: 2010–2015 ===
In 2013, Mizan moved to New York where she continued work on music. Her free-styled cover songs" including "Crazy" by CeeLo Green, and "Ain't No Sunshine" by Bill Withers earned her 1st place at the Amateur Night in the Apollo Theatre in Harlem. She soon set up a studio with long time collaborator The Brown Ghost to start recording a collection of tracks, which would later become Dark Blue. Together, they produced and composed all the music and videos with an all DIY approach. "Dissatisfied" with the limited and "sanitized romance" of pop music, the two combined "electronic", "keyboard elements," as well as traditional instruments to create a work that "looks to minimalism and relatability as the music's primary goals." Mizan announced the completion of her EP in November 2015, by releasing all tracks as singles with videos alongside them, including "Thru" and "Looking For," in which Pitchfork noted Mizan's vocals as a "vibrato that glows over self-discovery" The album became recognized by Rolling Stone as a "terrific six-song EP" that was "stark and frank," naming it one of 20 best R&B albums of the year. Billboard dubbed the work as "a refreshing take on the human experience...discussed everything from anxiety as an inherent part of urban living to waking up to one's surrounding...with Mizan's voice as the glowing centerpiece"

== Discography ==
=== EPs ===
- Dark Blue (2015, Self-released)

=== Music Videos ===
List of music videos, showing year released and director
Title	Year	Director(s)	Ref.
"No Fool"	2013	str8ngecreature	
"Anxious"	2013	str8ngecreature	
"Looking For"	2015	str8ngecreature, Mizan, Hasabie	
"Thru"	2015	str8ngecreature, Hasabie	
"7 Billion"	2016	Mizan, str8ngecreature	
"Awe"	2016	Mizan	

== See also ==
- Kelela
- Aster Aweke
- Asnaketch Worku
- Bizunesh Bekele
