= Mizanur Rahman Kazi =

Meghalaya politician (born 1975)

Dr. Md. Mizanur Rahman Kazi
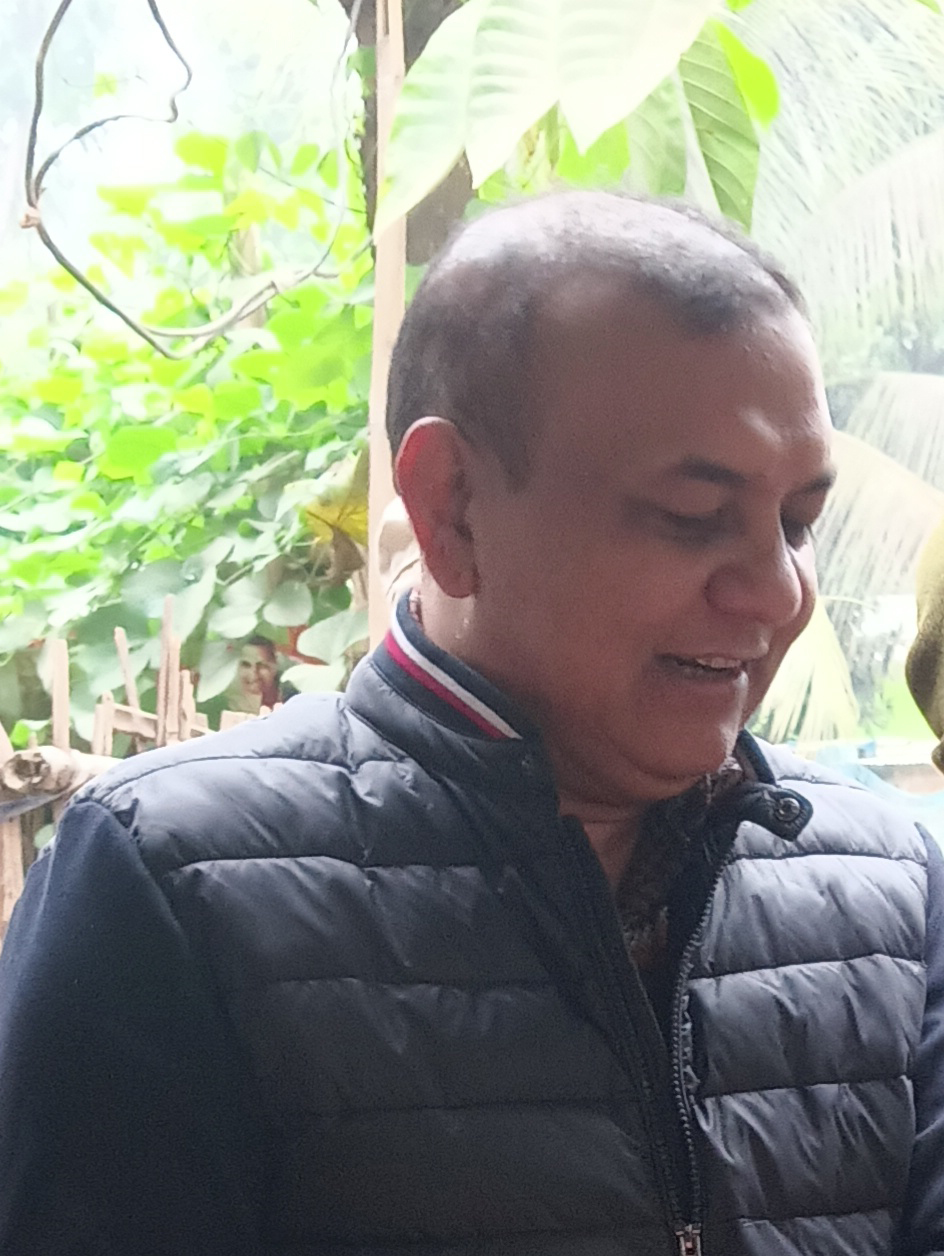
- When Garodubi came to visit the village, he was busy playing carrom.

Member of Meghalaya Legislative Assembly
- Incumbent
- Assumed office 2023
- Preceded by: Abdus Saleh
- Constituency: Rajabala

Personal details
- Born: 1975 (age 50–51) Rajabala, Meghalaya
- Party: All India Trinamool Congress (until 2026); Mamata All India Trinamool Congress (from 2026)
- Other political affiliations: United Democratic Party (2013-2018); National People's Party(2018-2023)
- Children: 2

Mizanur Rahman Kazi (Bengali: মিজানুর রহমান কাজী) is a doctor and politician. He is the current MLA for the Rajabala constituency in the Meghalaya Legislative Assembly. Kazi is a fellow of the Indian Association of Clinical Medicine and recipient of the Distance Fellowship in Diabetes Management (DFID) from Christian Medical College Vellore.

== Early life and education ==
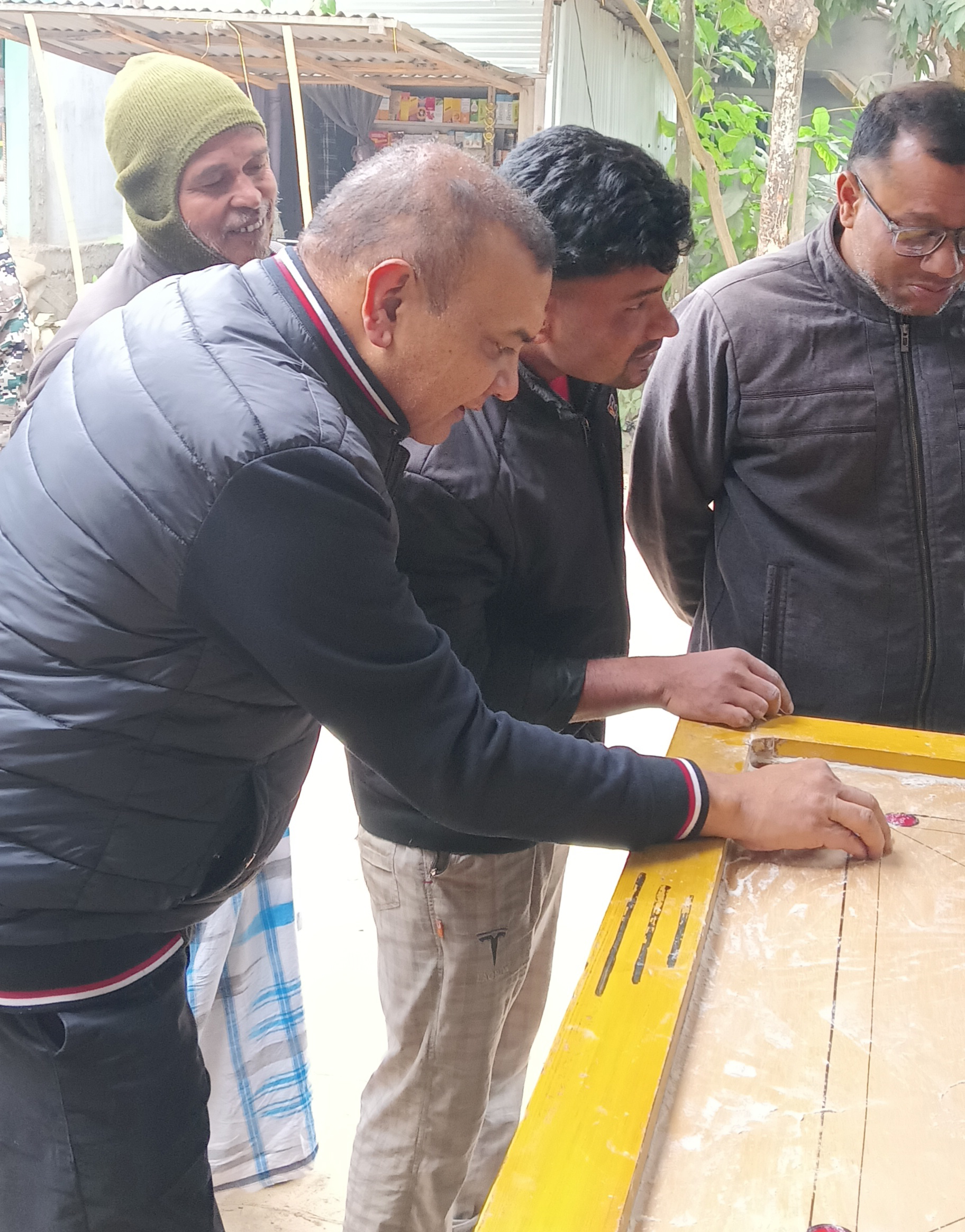
while playing carrom at Garodubi Village

Mizanur Rahman Kazi was born into a Muslim family of Kazi’s in Rajabala, located in the West Garo Hills district of Meghalaya. His father is Abdul Jalil Kazi, who was a close associate of Lt. P. A. Sangma. His wife Sabina Kazi holds an MBA degree from AMU and is a businesswoman. Kazi has a son Sohail Kazi and a daughter Myreen Kazi. Kazi graduated from Sarojini Naidu Medical College under Dr. Bhimrao Ambedkar University Agra in 2005 with a Doctor of Medicine (MD) degree and became a private medical practitioner. He owns land on the Meghalaya plains and Dhubri and New Delhi.

== Political career ==
Dr. Kazi contested the 2023 Meghalaya Legislative Assembly election on the All india Trinamool Congress ticket where he was successfully elected, defeating four-time MLA Abdus Saleh of the NPP by 10 votes.
