= Muhammad Hafizur Rahman =

Hafizur Rahman is a retired additional secretary who served on the Public Administration Reform Commission in the Yunus Ministry. He was appointed administrator of the Federation of Bangladesh Chambers of Commerce & Industries (FBCCI) in 2024.

== Career ==
Rahman accompanied the Minister of Commerce Tipu Munshi to Saskatchewan, Canada to develop trade relationships in November 2021. He was the director general of the WTO Cell at the Ministry of Commerce in 2022.

Rahman retired as an additional secretary. He later became a member of the Bangladesh Competition Commission.

After the fall of the Sheikh Hasina-led Awami League government, Rahman was appointed a member of the Public Administration Reform Commission in the Yunus Ministry.

In September 2024, he was appointed administrator of the Federation of Bangladesh Chambers of Commerce & Industries (FBCCI) by the Ministry of Commerce under the Trade Organizations Ordinance, 2022. He replaced Mahbubul Alam, who resigned during changes in public institution leaderships after the fall of the Sheikh Hasina-led Awami League government. According to the appointment order, he was tasked with overseeing a fair and neutral election within 120 days and transferring authority to an elected committee thereafter. He left the office in September 2025 after resigning and was replaced by a new administrator, Md. Abdur Rahim Khan.
