= Amrah bint Abdul Rahman =

Islamic scholar (died 717)

Amrah bint Abdul Rahman (Arabic: عمرة بنت عبد الرحمن, died 717 CE) was an early Islamic mufti and scholar.

== Biography ==
Rahman was a member of the tabieen who followed the generation of the Prophet’s companions. Most mistake her as the granddaughter of As’ad ibn Zurara due to his popularity as the first chief in Medina to become a Muslim convert. Rather, the knowledgeable of the genealogies of the Anṣār noted that she is from the descendants of Saʿd ibn Zurāra, the brother of As’ad ibn Zurara. She grew up under the care of the Prophet Muhammad's third wife, Aisha bint Abu Bakr, and may have acted as Aisha’s personal secretary.

Rahman became an early Islamic scholar who was an expert in Islamic theology and jurisprudence. She was among the most authoritative and reliable narrators of the hadith of Aisha (including her fiqh judgments), Umm Salama, Rafi' ibn Khadij, and Umm Hisham bint Harithah.

When the Judge of Medina Muhammad bin Abī Bakr bin Hazm ruled in a case involving a Christian thief from Syria who had stolen something, he wrote to Rahman for advice. She informed him that he could not order the severing of the man's hand, as the hand of a thief could only be cut off for stolen amounts over one-quarter of a dīnār, so he ordered that the man be released. He did not question her judgement or seek out other scholars.

Umar bin Abdul Aziz, caliph and scholar, would advise people that if they wanted to learn prophetic sayings, they should go to Rahman, as none knew more of the hadith than her. Ahmad bin Hanbal described Rahman as "an eminent theologian and great scholar." Her knowledge and piety attracted students who she transmitted her knowledge to, including Urwa ibn al‑Zubayr, Sulaymān ibn Yasār, Amr ibn Dinar and Ibn Shihab al-Zuhri, who called her a "sea of knowledge."

Rahman belonged to a family composed of scholars and transmitters. Her siblings, children, nephews and grandchildren formed a household of learning. Among those who narrated from her are her son Abū al‑Rijāl, her brother Muḥammad ibn ʿAbd al‑Raḥmān al‑Anṣārī, her nephew Yaḥyā ibn ʿAbd Allāh ibn ʿAbd al‑Raḥmān, her grandson Ḥārithah ibn Abī al‑Rijāl and her sister’s son Abū Bakr ibn Muḥammad ibn ʿAmr ibn Ḥazm. Among the female transmitters were Rā’ita al Muznīyya and Fātima bint Munzar bin Zubaīr.

Rahman died in 98 AH (717 CE) in Medina, aged 77. ‘Abd al-Raḥmān bin Ḥārithah bin al-Nu’mān was Rahman's husband, and her son was Abū al-Rijāl Muḥammad, who had transmitted hadith from his mother mostly. Her nephew was the judge Abu Bakr ibn Hazm.

Her narrations appear in all the major authoritative hadith collections, including the six canonical hadith collections.
