= Mohamed Ashik =

Indian speaker

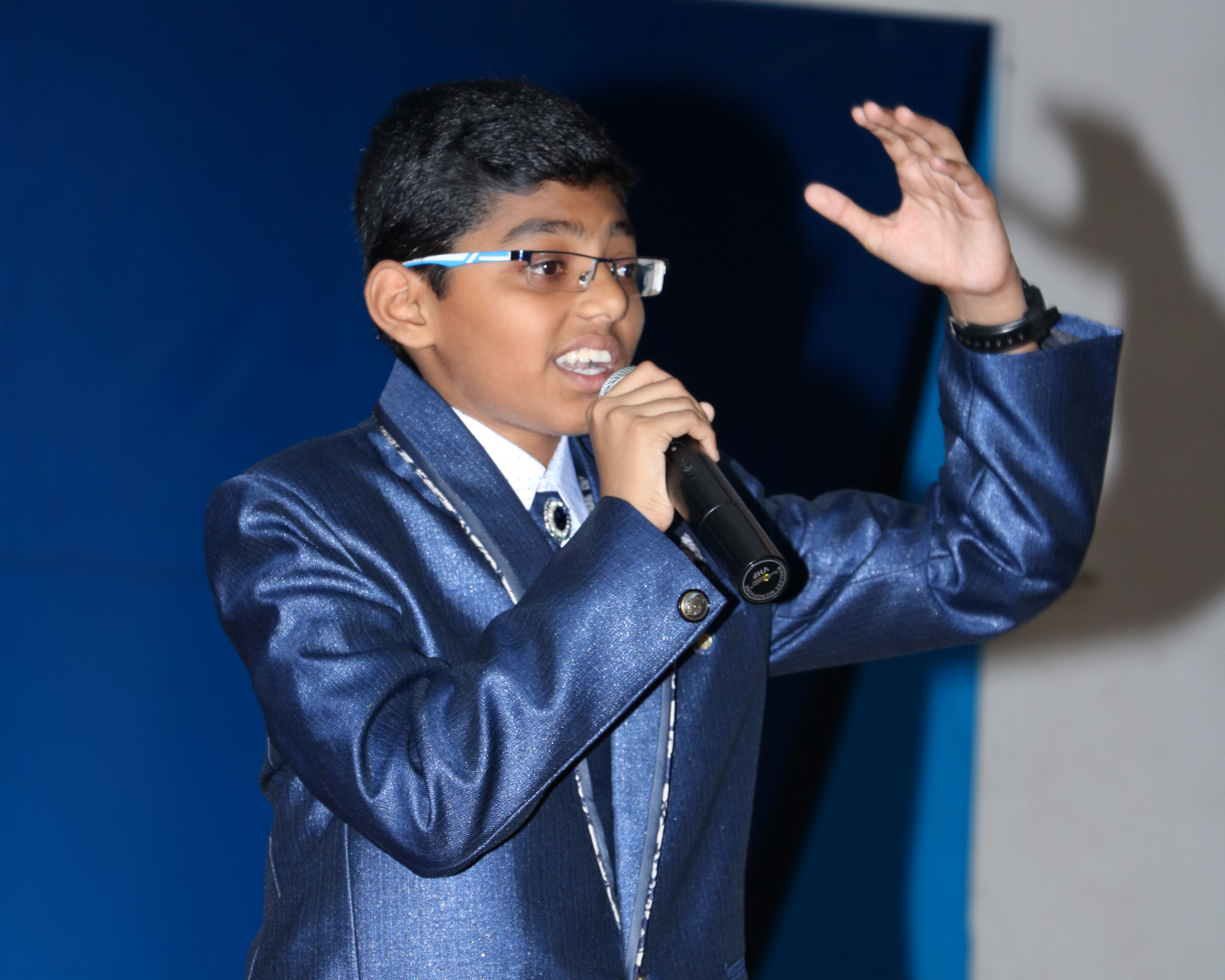
- Mohamed Ashik speaking
- Born: 25 January 2004 (age 22); Madurai, Tamil Nadu, India
- Occupations: Founder-IPEDO, peace activist, speaker
- Organization(s): International Peace and Economic Development Organization
- Known for: World Record, Peace Activism
- Awards: World Record Holder
- Honours: Pogo Amazing Kids Genius Award by POGO Television

Mohamed Ashik is a world record holder and a former child prodigy from India. He became the youngest world map memorizer in the world at the age of six. He is a public orator and motivational speaker. Ashik was titled "genius" at the Pogo Amazing Kids 2011 Awards when he was seven years old. Ashik is also a peace activist and the founder of International Peace and Economic Development Organization.

== Life ==
=== Childhood ===
Ashik was born on 25 January 2004 in Madurai, Tamil Nadu in India. He did a world record at the age of six by memorizing and pointing out 195 countries on a plain world map in three minutes in front of a gathering consisting of around 5000 people.

=== Achievements ===
He was crowned as "photographic memory" in the world record certificates and news articles. Ashik began winning prizes and awards in numerous elocution competitions since he was four years old including the All India Elocution Competition - I Revived the Mahatma Competing with senior secondary students when he was just five years old. He was awarded the "genius" title in the Pogo Amazing Kids Awards 2011 at Mumbai, India by Pogo Television Network. Ashik is giving motivational speeches to various audiences and inspiring them to work for international co-operation and development since he was seven years old.

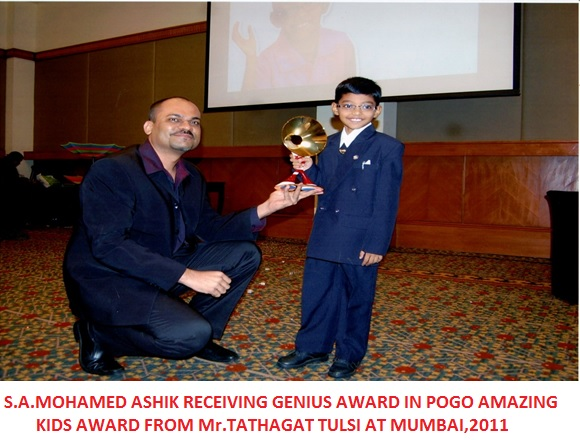
Mohamed Ashik Receiving Pogo Amazing Kids "Genius" Award

=== Peace Activism ===
Ashik started his activism for world peace and founded International Peace and Economic Development Organization with his vision of International Peace and co-operation when he was 14 years old.
