= 2020 Hathras gang rape and murder =

Torture, gang rape, and murder incident in India

2020 Hathras Gang Rape and Murder
- 2020 Hathras gang rape and murder (Uttar Pradesh)
- Location: 27.60°N 78.05°E; Hathras, Uttar Pradesh, India
- Date: 14 September 2020
- Attack type: Rape, murder, dragging and strangling (with dupatta)
- Deaths: 1
- Perpetrator: 4
- Accused: Sandip Thakur, Ramu Thakur, Lavkush Thakur and Ravi Thakur
- Charges: murder, gang rape and violations of the Scheduled Caste and Scheduled Tribe (Prevention of Atrocities) Act, 1989.
- Verdict: No Rape or Murder Proven
- Convictions: 3 accused Ramu Thakur, Lavkush Thakur and Ravi Thakur were released by the court. None of them were present at the crime spot. Sandeep Thakur convicted for culpable homicide (IPC 304) and no rape charges (IPC 374) established.
- Convicted: Sandeep Thakur - For culpable homicide (IPC 304)

On 14 September 2020, a gang-rape of a 19-year-old woman was reported in Hathras district, Uttar Pradesh, India, by four men. She died two weeks later in a Delhi hospital.

Initially, it was reported that one accused had tried to kill her, later in her statement to the magistrate, the victim named four accused as having raped her. No arrests were made in the first 10 days after the incident took place. After her death, the victim's body was forcefully cremated by the police without the consent of her family, although police claimed consent was obtained prior to cremation.

The case and its subsequent handling received widespread media attention and condemnation from across the country, and was the subject of protests against the Yogi Adityanath government by activists and opposition. The mishandling of the case additionally caused a severe damage to the reputation of the Uttar Pradesh Police, which faced harsh criticism from the CBI, lawyers and activists, who took-over the investigation after noticing the misconducts and the botched up investigation committed by the Uttar Pradesh Police.

== Incident ==
The incident took place on 14 September 2020, when the victim, a 19-year-old Dalit woman, went to a farm to collect cattle fodder. According to the victim's dying statement, four men–Sandeep Thakur, Ramu Thakur, Lavkush Thakur and Ravi Thakur–dragged her away by the dupatta around her neck injuring her spinal cord in the process. The violence left her paralyzed with a severe spinal cord injury. Her tongue was cut off. The perpetrators had tried to strangle the girl as she resisted their rape attempt. She ended up biting her tongue while being strangled. Her cries were heard by her mother, who came to the spot to find her lying down in the farm. She was at first taken to the Chand Pa police station, where the Station house officer, D. K. Verma, rejected her claims and, according to the family, humiliated them. The police registered a complaint six days later, on 20 September. The police were able to record the victim's statement on 22 September. In her three recorded statements, she mentioned that she was raped and, when she attempted to resist, strangled. The victim was initially admitted to the Jawaharlal Nehru Medical College and Hospital in Aligarh on 14 September, with her spinal cord severely damaged. She was later moved to the Safdarjung Hospital in Delhi, after her condition worsened. According to the police, the victim had been strangled with her dupatta. She died on 29 September 2020.

The mother of the victim said that Sandeep and Lavkush had been harassing her and the victim for months.

The autopsy registered the cause of death as "injury to the cervical spine by blunt-force trauma". The report mentioned old healed injuries to her private parts, though the exact age is not mentioned. A scientific officer had clarified that the injuries of the rape incident could have been healed during the time period of treatment.

== Cremation ==
The victim was forcefully cremated on the night at about 2:30 am on 29 September 2020 by Uttar Pradesh Police without the consent of the victim's family. It was done without the family's consent and they were locked up in their house. According to reports petrol was used for cremation. However Prashant Kumar, ADG (law and order), said that the family's consent was obtained.

The reports of the forced cremation led the Allahabad High Court to take suo moto cognisance. The bench also asked the victim's family, the District Magistrate and the Superintendent of Police to appear before it. The bench added, "The incidents which took place after the death of the victim on 29.09.2020 leading up to her cremation, have shocked our conscience".

== Police and administration ==
When the news broke out initially through social media, Agra Police, Hathras District Magistrate, and UP's Information & Public Relations called it "fake news". Later, a senior UP Police officer claimed that no sperm was found in samples as per forensic report and that some people had "twisted" the incident to stir "caste-based tension." The officer also said that the forensic report revealed that the victim was not raped. However, Experts have alleged this evidence is unreliable, citing guidelines that state swabs to test for sperm should only be taken if the assault might have occurred in the previous three days. After three to four days, swabs should be taken to test only for semen, not for sperm. Kumar also stated that the forensic report had found "no semen or semen excretion"; a retired officer quoted by the BBC criticized that "Police officers should not jump to conclusions. The presence or absence of semen by itself does not prove rape. We need a lot of other circumstantial and other evidence."

Reports indicated that the family faced pressure from the administration. A video emerged in which the Hathras District Magistrate is seen pressuring the family into changing their statement. He could be heard saying "Don’t ruin your credibility. These media people will leave in a couple of days. Half have already left, the rest will leave in 2–3 days. We are the ones standing with you. Now it depends on you if you want to keep changing your testimony...."

On 3 October, the state government suspended five police officers including the Superintendent of Police. The Station House Officer of Chand Pa Police Station D. K. Verma was subsequently transferred for failure to act promptly, refusing to file a report, and humiliating the victim and her family.

The Wire and others reported that the Uttar Pradesh government employed Concept PR, a Mumbai public relations firm. The PR firm allegedly sent out press releases (on behalf of the government) stating that the Hathras teenager was not raped. The press releases also alluded to a conspiracy to push the state of Uttar Pradesh into caste turmoil.

On 4 October, Yogi Adityanath recommended a CBI probe. The victim's family was not in favour of the CBI investigation and wanted a judicial probe to be conducted in the case. However, the CBI began its investigation on 10 October, amid nationwide outrage, after notification from central government.

The Uttar Pradesh government alleged a "deep rooted conspiracy" and an "international plot" to incite caste based riots in Hathras and defame the Yogi government. Nineteen FIRs have been filed by the Uttar Pradesh police in the aftermath of the alleged gang rape. The charges listed by police on the main FIR include inciting caste based divides, religious discrimination, doctoring electronic evidence, a conspiracy against the state and defamation. Yogi Adityanath had earlier asked his party workers to "expose those who want to incite caste and communal riots". UP Police detained 4 men, including a Delhi-based journalist Sidheeq Kappan under Unlawful Activities (Prevention) Act, for their alleged link to Popular Front of India PFI, on Mathura Toll Plaza, while on their way to the village. The administration alleged that the men were on their way to Hathras for inciting caste and communal violence.

== Arrests and compensation ==
Hathras police have arrested the four accused — Sandeep, Ramu, Lavkush and Ravi — on charges of attempt to murder, gang rape and violations of the Scheduled Caste and Scheduled Tribe (Prevention of Atrocities) Act, 1989. One of the accused, Ravi, and his father had been arrested 15–20 years ago for assaulting the victim's grandfather. .No arrest was made in the first 10 days of the incident. SSP Vikrant Vir had transferred the SHO of Chandpa police station to police lines for failing to promptly act in the case. The state government, Yogi Adityanath and district administration announced a compensation of ₹2.5 million (US$26,000) to the victim's family and a junior assistant job for a family member. Apart from this, the family will also be allotted a house in Hathras under a State Urban Development Agency (SUDA) scheme.

== Claims of the accused ==
The main accused, Sandeep Thakur, who is in jail along with the three others, has written a letter to the police in Hathras, claiming that he and the 20-year-old girl were "friends", who "apart from meeting, used to speak on the phone once in a while"; further alleged that her family was against their friendship, and they killed her. The UP police has alleged that call records show that the woman's family knew the main accused, Sandeep Thakur. As per the Call Detail Report released, around 100 phone calls were made from a phone number registered in the name of the girl's brother and the main accused Sandeep Thakur between October 2019 and March 2020.

== Reactions ==
The case and its subsequent handling has received widespread media attention and condemnation from across the country, and was the subject of protests against the Yogi Adityanath government by activists and opposition.

Former Congress president Rahul Gandhi and general secretary Priyanka Gandhi were accosted and detained by police in the state of Uttar Pradesh as they attempted to make their way to the village of the victim on foot after their vehicles had been stopped by officers on the motorway. BSP national president and former Chief Minister Mayawati demanded resignation of Chief Minister Yogi stating him as an incapable to protecting Dalits in Uttar Pradesh, she further asserted that he should oversee newly built Ram Mandir, Ayodhya or join his Gorakhnath Math.

According to some media reports, a group calling itself "Rashtriya Savarna Parishad" came out in support of the accused. The involvement of the police was also implicitly found in various media reports. Another media report stated that an outfit called 'National Sawarna Council' visited the Superintendent of Police and filed a memorandum alleging the family of the victim girl to be involved in implication of the innocent people. A day after the police forcefully cremated the body of the rape victim, Chandrashekhar Azad the president of Bhim Army (a Dalit-rights organisation based in Uttar Pradesh) was placed under house arrest for staging a protest against the government demanding justice for the victim.

On 3 October 2020, Indian National Congress leaders Rahul Gandhi and Priyanka Gandhi Vadra visited the victim's family. This was dismissed by the BJP as a "political stunt".

Delhi chief minister Arvind Kejriwal demanded the execution of the accused.

On 2 October, BJP IT cell head Amit Malviya tweeted a video of the 19-year-old victim, which showed her face, allegedly in contravention of Section 228A of the Indian Penal Code. Similarly, Tamil Nadu's BJP IT cell head CTR Nirmal Kumar posted a video of the 19-year-old Dalit woman with insensitive remark, that clearly revealed the identity of the woman, which is in violation of Supreme Court guidelines.

On 4 October, Rajveer Singh Pehelwan, an ex-MLA of the Bharatiya Janata Party (BJP), held a rally in support of the accused. Hundreds of people attended the rally, including the family members of the four accused. The meeting was also attended by members of various right-wing outfits like the Rashtriya Swayamsevak Sangh (RSS), Karni Sena and Bajrang Dal. These members were also part of various upper caste outfits including Kshatriya Mahasabha, Rashtriya Savarna Sangathan, etc. On 7 October, the ex-BJP MLA and 100 others were booked by the UP Police for organizing the rally.

BJP leader, Ranjeet Srivastava, said that the accused are not guilty of a crime. He further asserted that "Such girls are found dead in only some places". They will be found dead in sugarcane, corn and millet fields or in bushes, gutters or forests. Why are they never found dead in paddy or wheat fields?" The head of the National Commission for Women commented this was an unfit statement for any political party leader. Another remark that drew fierce criticism came from BJP MLA, Surendra Nath Singh that "Sanskar should be instilled in girls to prevent incidents of rape".

The United Nations in India expressed concerns over gender based violence. In the statement they mentioned that, "it is essential that authorities ensure the perpetrators are brought to justice speedily and families are empowered to seek timely justice, social support, counselling, healthcare and rehabilitation".

On 30 September, around 5,000 sanitation workers in Agra, who belong to the Valmiki community, went on a strike to demand justice for the victim. Protestors in Jantar Mantar, New Delhi demanded the resignation of Uttar Pradesh Chief Minister Yogi Adityanath on 2 October. However, the protest in India Gate on 1 October was rejected under the Section 144 of CrPC. On 9 October 2020, various dalit organizations called a Bandh which halted normal life in Punjab. Bahujan Samaj Party workers organized protests against Yogi Adityanath in the different parts of country. Indian students, professors and scholars staged a protest in United Kingdom in memory of the victims. Protests were staged in the United States of America, particularly in Times Square, Headquarters of the United Nations, Michigan and Philadelphia, against the Indian government. B. R. Ambedkar followers in the parts of South America, North America, Middle East, Europe and Asia demanded justice for the victim.

== Trial ==
On 19 December 2020, CBI filed a chargesheet in a special court in Hathras, invoking gang rape and murder charges along with charges under SC/ST Prevention of Atrocities Act, against the four accused. CBI also mentioned lapses on part of UP Police that include delay in recording the victim's statement in writing and her subsequent medical examination. The CBI reportedly found a record of a total of 115 calls exchanged between the victim and the accused from October 2019 to March 2020.

=== Verdict ===
On 2 March 2023, the Hathras district court, in its decision, acquitted three of the four accused, Ramu, Luvkush, and Ravi. The fourth, Sandeep, was convicted for the offences of culpable homicide not amounting to murder (IPC Section 304) and provisions under the SC/ST Act, but not for rape and murder, and was sentenced to life imprisonment along with a fine of ₹50,000. The defence and the prosecution have both appealed against the verdict in the Allahabad High Court. The Uttar Pradesh Police has been criticized by the CBI for inaction and delay in collecting samples as well as other evidence, eventually botching up the investigation, which led to the acquittal.

== See also ==
- 2012 Delhi gang rape and murder
- 2014 Badaun gang rape allegations
- 2017 Unnao rape case
- 2020 Balrampur gang rape
- 2024 Kolkata rape and murder case
