= Kaminey (soundtrack) =

Soundtrack album by Vishal Bhardwaj
- Released: 6 July 2009
- Recorded: 2008–2009
- Genre: Feature film soundtrack
- Length: 35:57
- Language: Hindi
- Label: T-Series
- Producer: Clinton Cerejo; Hitesh Sonik

Vishal Bhardwaj chronology
Haal-e-dil (2008)	Kaminey (2009)	Ishqiya (2010)

Kaminey is the soundtrack to the 2009 film of the same name directed by Vishal Bhardwaj, who also composed the film's musical score and soundtrack with lyrics written by Gulzar. The soundtrack featured eight tracks in total: five original songs, two remixes and a theme song; it was released by T-Series on 6 July 2009 and received critical and commercial success, especially "Dhan Te Nan", which topped the charts across various platforms.

== Development ==
He associated with his longtime collaborator Gulzar for the lyrics, who was involved in the creative process by helped Bhardwaj for the scripting and characterizations. The song "Dhan Te Nan" is a rehashed version of a song originally composed by Vishal Bhardwaj for an episode of the Zee TV series Gubbare.

Bhardwaj sung the title song for the film, besides composing. He was initially intended to record the vocals for "Pehli Baar Mohabbat" but instead he brought Mohit Chauhan to provide vocals. Bhardwaj stated that before shooting, he used to make a mix of the song in his own voice and picturize it and later dub the track and would not use original artists unless it is a sync song, saving him much time. He would sing all the songs in his own voice, either male or female so that he would give reference to the original singer, for the mood and expression on how it would be sung.

== Reception ==
The soundtrack album received both critical and commercial success, post-release, especially "Dhan Te Nan", which topped the charts across various platforms. Raja Sen of Rediff.com rated the album 4.5 out of 5, calling it as a "masterpiece" and a "soundtrack that is lethally explosive. Not that we expected anything less." Joginder Tuteja from Bollywood Hungama gave a rating 4 out 5, stating the soundtrack's primary strength is certainly not being "a run of the mill album" and consisted of chartbusters and "innovative and situational" tracks showcasing Bhardwaj's range. He concluded it as one of the "excellent albums that have hit the stands during last one month." Jaykumar Shah of Planet Bollywood rated the album 8.5 out of 10 calling it as the best soundtrack released that year, and that "[i]t has experimentations with both music and lyrics".

Critic based at Indo-Asian News Service described it as one among the "finest scores" of that year being "Experimental in its sound, yet very mainstream in appeal." Another review from The Indian Express summarised it as: "Vishal conjures almost magic and comes up with a laudable effort. The album is really worth buying." Vipin Nair of Music Aloud wrote "Vishal Bharadwaj continues to surprise with his diversity". Karthik Srinivasan of Milliblog called it as a "spectacularly satisfying" album, while Manjari Hegde of Behindwoods wrote "This one surely has loads of sound and music". Devarsi Ghosh of Scroll.in wrote "The Kaminey album is a textbook example of how original tunes can spruce up a film with no need or place of music in its narrative, and even add to its memorability for posterity."

== Track listing ==
No.	Title	Singer(s)	Length
1.	"Dhan Te Nan"	Sukhwinder Singh, Vishal Dadlani	4:41
2.	"Fatak"	Sukhwinder Singh, Kailash Kher	5:30
3.	"Go Charlie Go" (Theme)	Instrumental	2:12
4.	"Kaminey"	Vishal Bhardwaj	5:58
5.	"Raat Ke Dhai Baje"	Suresh Wadkar, Rekha Bhardwaj, Sunidhi Chauhan, Kunal Ganjawala	4:31
6.	"Pehli Baar Mohabbat"	Mohit Chauhan	5:20
7.	"Dhan Te Nan" (Remix)	Sukhwinder Singh, Vishal Dadlani	4:03
8.	"Raat Ke Dhai Baje" (Remix)	Suresh Wadkar, Rekha Bhardwaj, Sunidhi Chauhan, Kunal Ganjawala	4:20
Total length:			35:57

== Accolades ==
Award	Date of ceremony (Note: Date is linked to the article about the awards held that year, wherever possible.)	Category	Recipients	Result	Ref.
Apsara Film & Television Producers Guild Awards (Note: Also known as Star Guild Awards.)	8 January 2010	Best Lyricist	Gulzar (for the song "Dhan Te Nan")	Nominated	
Apsara Film & Television Producers Guild Awards	8 January 2010	Best Male Playback Singer	Vishal Dadlani, Sukhwinder Singh (for the song "Dhan Te Nan")	Nominated	
Filmfare Awards	22 February 2010	Best Music Director	Vishal Bhardwaj	Nominated	
Filmfare Awards	22 February 2010	Best Lyricist	Gulzar (for the song "Dhan Te Nan")	Nominated	
Filmfare Awards	22 February 2010	Best Lyricist	Gulzar (for the song "Kaminey")	Nominated	
Filmfare Awards	22 February 2010	Best Male Playback Singer	Vishal Dadlani, Sukhwinder Singh (for the song "Dhan Te Nan")	Nominated	
Global Indian Music Academy Awards	10 November 2010	Most Popular Caller Tune	Vishal Bhardwaj (for the song "Dhan Te Nan")	Won	
Global Indian Music Academy Awards	10 November 2010	Best Music Director	Vishal Bhardwaj	Won	
Global Indian Music Academy Awards	10 November 2010	Best Music Arranger and Programmer	Clinton Cerejo, Hitesh Sonik (for the song "Dhan Te Nan")	Won	
International Indian Film Academy Awards	5 June 2010	Best Music Director	Vishal Bhardwaj	Nominated	
International Indian Film Academy Awards	5 June 2010	Best Lyricist	Gulzar	Nominated	
International Indian Film Academy Awards	5 June 2010	Best Male Playback	Vishal Dadlani, Sukhwinder Singh (for the song "Dhan Te Nan")	Nominated	
Screen Awards	9 January 2010	Best Music Director	Vishal Bhardwaj	Nominated	
Screen Awards	9 January 2010	Best Male Playback	Vishal Dadlani, Sukhwinder Singh (for the song "Dhan Te Nan")	Nominated	
Screen Awards	9 January 2010	Best Background Music	Vishal Bhardwaj	Nominated	
V. Shantaram Awards	21 December 2009	Best Music	Vishal Bhardwaj	Nominated	
