= Mizan (Ottoman newspaper) =

Ottoman newspaper (1886–1909)

- Type: Weekly newspaper
- Founder: Mizancı Murat
- Founded: 1886
- Ceased publication: 14 April 1909
- Language: Ottoman Turkish
- Headquarters: Istanbul
- Country: Ottoman Empire

Mizan (Turkish: Balance) was an Ottoman newspaper which existed from 1886 to 1909 with some interruptions. The paper was published in different cities, including Istanbul, Cairo, Paris and Geneva. It was one of the official media outlets of the Committee of Union and Progress.

== History and profile ==
Mizan was launched by Mehmed Murat in Istanbul in 1886 as a weekly newspaper. Due to the popularity of the paper he became known as Mizancı Murat who was one of the leaders of Young Turks.

The first issue of Mizan appeared on 21 August 1886, and the paper was based in Istanbul until 11 December 1890. It was banned by the Ottoman government due to its critical approach towards the government officials. After a six-year hiatus Mizan was restarted in Cairo on 21 January 1896. The Ottoman Sultan asked Khedive Abbas Hilmi to arrest Mizancı Murat and to close down Mizan. Although the demands of the Sultan were rejected, the paper could stay in Egypt only until 8 July 1896. In Cairo the weekly Mizan was published by the Committee of Union and Progress on Thursdays. The license of the paper was held by Mehmed Murat Enveri, and the managers were Abdullah Ilmi and Dr. Lutfi.

The paper was restarted in Paris and published there between 14 December 1896 and 3 May 1897. Next it appeared in Geneva between 10 May and 19 July 1897. It was relaunched on 30 July 1908 in Istanbul, but it ceased publication with the last issue dated 14 April 1909. The reason for its closure was the arrest of Mizancı Murat who was sent to exile due to his alleged role in the coup against the Committee of Union and Progress in 1909.

Mizan adopted a critical approach towards the Ottoman Sultan and grand viziers which led to Mizancı Murat's exile in different countries and to the publication of the paper in different cities. While being published in Cairo, the paper was financed by Khedive Abbas Hilmi, and had higher circulation levels both in Istanbul and Yemen.
