= Mizanur Rahman Bhuiyan =

Bangladeshi judge (died 2020)

Justice of the High Court Division of Bangladesh

Personal details
- Profession: Judge

Mizanur Rahman Bhuiyan (died January 2020) was a judge of the High Court Division of Bangladesh Supreme Court.

== Career ==
In November 2012, Bhuiyan acquitted former minister A. K. M. Mosharraf Hossain and his wife, Zeenat Mosharraf, in a corruption case from on 1 January 1991 filed by the Bureau of Anti Corruption over his chairmanship of the Bangladesh Chemical Industries Corporation.

Bhuiyan distributed copies of the Daily Inqilab which described blogger Ahmed Rajib Haidar, murdered by Islamists on 15 February, as a murtad among judges of the High Court Division on 17 February. He actions were criticised in parliament by legislators who called on the minister of law, justice and parliamentary affairs to initiate an investigation. President of Bangladesh Zillur Rahman ordered an investigation of improper conduct by a Supreme Judicial Council against Bhuiyan. Attorney General of Bangladesh Mahbubey Alam, Supreme Court Bar Association, and Ekattorer Ghatak Dalal Nirmul Committee called for his removal. Lawyers aligned with the opposition Bangladesh Jamaat-e-Islami and Bangladesh Nationalist Party opposed the investigation. In August 2013, Bhuiyan was cleared by the Supreme Judicial Council headed by Chief Justice Md Muzammel Hossain. The two other members of the Supreme Judicial Council were justices Md. Abdul Wahhab Miah and Surendra Kumar Sinha.

In September 2015, Bhuiyan acquitted Bangladesh Nationalist Party politician Nazmul Huda in an extortion case filed in 2007.

== Personal life ==
Bhuiyan was married to Hasna Morshed.

== Death ==
Bhuiyan died in January 2020.
