= Mostafizur Rahman =

Mustafizur Rahman (Bengali: মুস্তাফিজুর রহমান) or Mostafizur Rahman (Bengali: মোস্তাফিজুর রহমান), a Bengali masculine given name of Arabic origin, may also refer to:

- Mostafizur Rahman Patal (died 1975), freedom fighter and inaugural MP of Bogra-5
- Mustafizur Rahman Siddiqi (1925–1992), entrepreneur, politician and diplomat
- Abu Saleh Mohammad Mustafizur Rahman (1934–1996), Bangladesh Army officer and politician
- Mustafizur Rahman (general) (1941–2008), 9th Chief of Army Staff
- Muhammad Mustafizur Rahman (1941–2014), Islamic scholar and academic
- Mustafizur Rahman (Chittagong politician) (1943–2001), politician, journalist and businessman
- Mostafizur Rahman (television personality) (1944–2026), Bangladeshi television director
- Mostafizur Rahman (politician, born 1953) (1953–2024), state minister
- Mustafizur Rahaman Chowdhury (born 1957), former MP of Chittagong-16
- Mostafizur Rahman (judge) (born 1959), High Court justice
- A.K.M. Mostafizur Rahman (born 1961), five-time MP of Kurigram-1
- KSM Mostafizur Rahman (born 1964), industrialist, economist and agriculturalist
- Mustafizur Rahaman (politician, born 1981), Indian politician
- Md. Mostafizur Rahman Fizu (died 2006), co-founder of Shopnopuri and MP of Dinajpur-6
- Mostafizur Rahman (Noakhali politician) (died 2013), MP of Noakhali-2
- Md. Mostafizur Rahman (Kurigram politician), MP of Kurigram-4
- Mohammad Mostafizur Rahman (air officer), air vice marshal and diplomat
- Mostafizur Rahman (physician), Bangladeshi physician
- Mohammad Mostafizur Rahman, former MP of Rajshahi-17
- Mostafizur Rahman (Patuakhali politician), professor and former MP of Patuakhali-4
- Mostafizur Rahman Manik, Bangladeshi film director
- Mostafizur Rahman Mostafa, mayor of Rangpur
- Mustafizur Rahman (diplomat), Bangladeshi diplomat
- Mustafizur Rahman (born 1995) is a Bangladeshi cricketer.

== See also ==
- Rahman (name)
