= Sidheeq Kappan =

Indian journalist

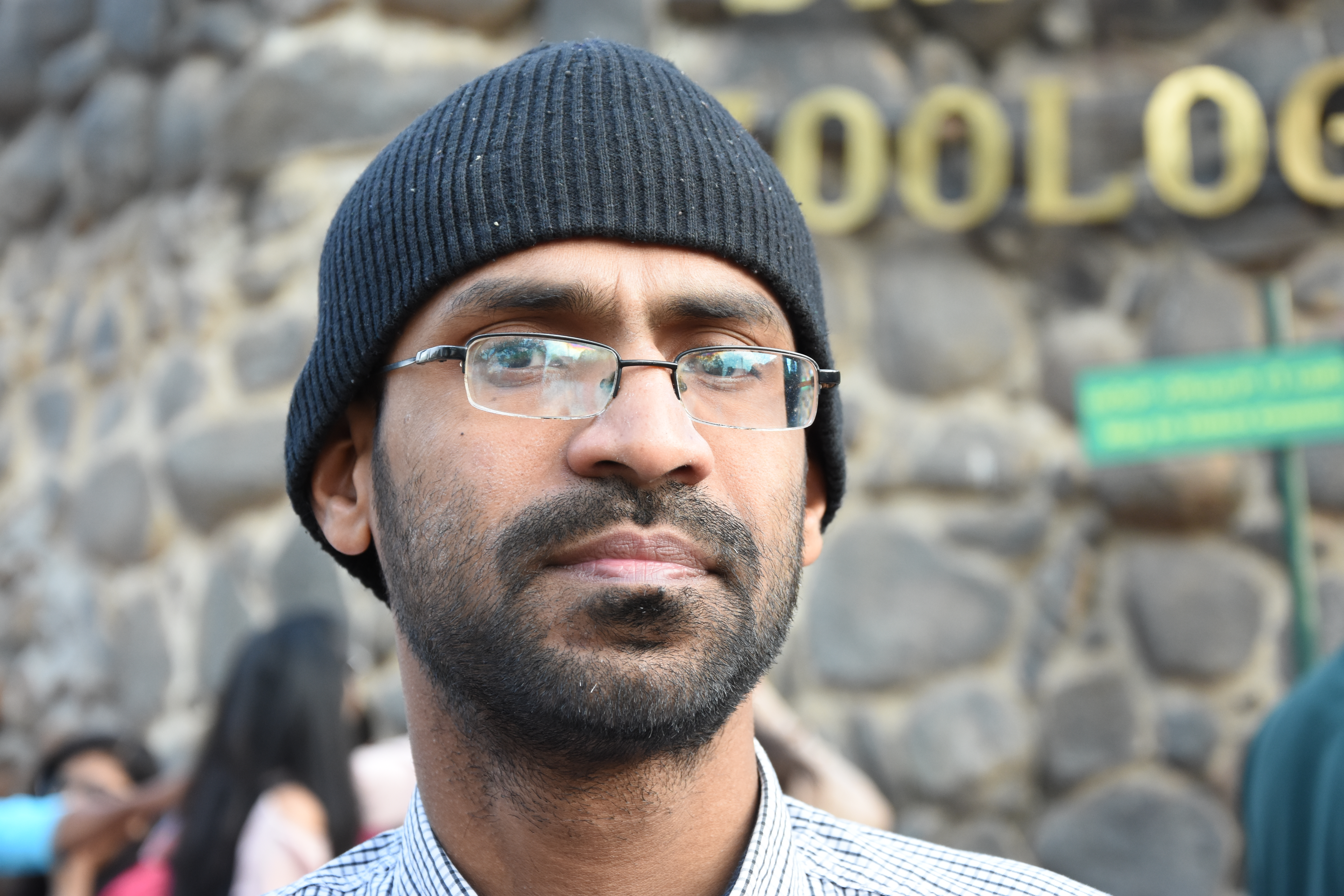
- Kappan in 2018
- Born: c. 1980; Kerala, India
- Other name: Siddique Kappan
- Occupation: Journalist
- Known for: Reporting on caste violence; government persecution of journalists
- Spouse: Raihanath Kappan
- Children: 3

Sidheeq Kappan is an Indian journalist from Kerala who had been imprisoned in October 2020 after being charged under the Unlawful Activities Prevention Act. He was arrested while on his way to Hathras to report on the story of the 19-year-old Dalit woman who died after being allegedly gang-raped by four men.

Before his imprisonment, Kappan was a regular contributor to the news portal Azhimukham.

== Arrest and detention ==
On 5 October 2020, Kappan, along with three others, were traveling to Hathras to report on the 2020 Hathras gang rape and murder. His car was stopped at a toll plaza in Mathura and all four were arrested by the Uttar Pradesh Police. The First Information Report submitted against him in Mathura court charged him with Section 124A (sedition), 153A (promoting enmity between different groups on grounds of religion, etc.) and 295A (deliberate and malicious acts, intended to outrage religious feelings of any class by insulting its religion or religious beliefs) of the Indian Penal Code and the Unlawful Activities (Prevention) Act (UAPA) and the Information Technology Act.

In February 2021, Kappan received five days' interim bail to visit his ailing mother, Khadeeja Kutty. The bail allowed only his close family to meet him. His mother later died in June 2021, after succumbing to illnesses.

In April 2021, Kappan tested positive for COVID-19. He was shifted to a hospital within the prison premises in Mathura. When his health worsened, he was moved to K.M Medical College in Mathura, where the attending doctors declared him "COVID negative". He was then returned to Mathura jail. After the intervention of the Supreme Court, he was relocated to the All India Institute of Medical Sciences for further treatment. In May 2021, he tested positive for COVID-19 again.

Kappan was granted bail on 9 September 2022, but would remain in jail due to a Enforcement Directorate case.

On 23 December 2022, Kappan got bail from the Allahabad High Court in the case filed by ED under PMLA.

After getting out of jail, he said that the police tortured him during the detention to get forced confessions out of him.

== Protests ==
Several protests were conducted in India, demanding the release of Kappan from prison. International press organizations have also expressed concern over the jailing of Kappan.

== Release ==
In February 2023, Kappan was released from prison after more than two years following his arrest. In December 2022, the Allahabad High Court granted him bail. However, it took over a month to secure his release due to procedural delays. After walking out of the prison, Kappan stated that he would continue to fight the charges against him.
