= Mizancı Murat =

Ottoman journalist (1853–1912)

Mizancı Murat Bey
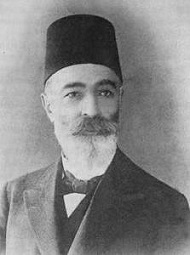

Personal details
- Born: 1853 Tbilisi, Russian Empire
- Died: 1912 (aged 58–59) Istanbul, Ottoman Empire

Mizancı Murat (1853–1912) was an Ottoman monarchist, democrat, historian and politician, who was renowned for his work on reviving the concept of Ottomanism during the Second Constitutional Era.

== Biography ==
Mizancı Murat was born in Tbilisi in 1853. He received education in Russia. Following his graduation he worked as a lecturer at Istanbul University. He was a member of the Young Turks and had a pan-Islamist political stance. In 1886 he launched a newspaper entitled Mizan. Due to his alleged role in the coup against the Committee of Union and Progress in 1909, Mizancı Murat was sent to exile. He returned to Istanbul later, but retired from politics, and he died in 1912.
