= Tameer Anwar =

Bangladeshi bodybuilder

- Born: December 10, 1985 (age 40)
- Education: Dhaka College

Tameer Anwar is the first Bangladeshi bodybuilder to win the first ever IFBB PRO CARD for Bangladesh in 2022. He has also won Mister Bangladesh, the national bodybuilding championship of Bangladesh, Six times : in 2014, 2015, 2016, 2019, 2020 and 2021. He was also crowned as the overall champion at Mister Marcel in 2016 and 2018.

== Early life ==
Tamir Anwar, Who is known as Mr. Bangladesh was born in Dhaka District, Nawabganj Upazila, Nayanshree Union, North Bahra village. He is the youngest son of Iklach Uddin and Rahima Begum.

== Career ==
Tamir, a four-time country bodybuilder, started his journey in 2001 while studying at Devendra College in Manikganj. Then he was an HSC student. After getting admission in Savar University College with honors in 2003, he also got admission in the gymnasium there. In 2006, he took part in a bodybuilding competition for the first time. He finished fourth in the Seba Independence Day competition. Two years later, Tamir got a chance to show his body at the national level. He finished fifth that time but finished second three times in the next five seasons. Tamir could not be satisfied with this either. 'If I can be second, why can't I be first' - he continued with this pursuit. He started working harder than before. His hard work was not in vain. In 2014, he took part in seven competitions and became the champion in all of them. Then he did not have to look back. Since then till now the highest title of body building is 'Mr. Bangladesh' in his possession. Tamir won the title three times in a row in 2014, 2015 and 2016. The competition was closed in 2016 and 2017. Even in the last 2019 event, he kept the title behind all the contestants. Tamir Anwar has also signed for success in foreign countries. He won a bronze medal in the Classic Physics category of the World Regional Championship held in Singapore. In India, Mr. Amateur has won twelfth place in the Olympics. The best success of Tamir's career came in July last year. He brought silver medals to the country at the Asian Bodybuilding and Fitness Championships held in Harbin, China. He also won his first medal in the Asian Olympics as a Bangladeshi bodybuilder.

== Medal ==
He brought silver medals to the country at the Asian Bodybuilding and Fitness Championships held in Harbin, China. He also won his first medal in the Asian Olympics as a Bangladeshi bodybuilder.
