= Afrana Islam Prity =

Bangladeshi tennis player

- Country (sports): Bangladesh
- Born: January 24, 2000 (age 26) Chittagong, Bangladesh
- Height: 5 ft 3 in (160 cm)
- Turned pro: 2015
- Prize money: $0

Singles
- Career record: 1–4 (20.00%)
- Career titles: 0
- Highest ranking: 1639
- Current ranking: -

Grand Slam singles results
- Australian Open: -
- French Open: -
- Wimbledon: -
- US Open: -

Doubles
- Career record: 0–4 (0.00%)
- Career titles: 0
- Last updated on: July 11, 2016.

Afrana Islam Prity (Bengali: আফরানা ইসলাম প্রীতি; born 24 January 2000) is a Bangladeshi tennis player. She plays on the junior ITF circuit under the WTA. She has a win-loss record of 1–4 in singles and 0–4 in doubles.

== Career ==
At the September 2013 Asian 14-Under Tennis event in Bangladesh, Prity won the women's singles and also won the women's doubles with Shah Safina Laxmi. At the Asian Under-14 Tennis Tournament that October, she won the women's singles and also won the women's doubles with Safina. At the ITF Under-14 Asian Championships Divisions-2 in Bangkok the following January, she won the consolation round against Perera Probaddhi of Sri Lanka.

In the 2014 Runner Group Independence Cup Open Tennis Tournament, she defeated the top seed, Sharmin Alam Sharda, in the semi-final round.

In 2016, she won the women's singles in the Independence Day Runner Open Tennis Tournament, defeating Popy Akhter 6–3, 6–4 in the final. She and Laxmi lost in straight sets in the final of the women's doubles.
