= Barak Valley =

Region in the Indian state of Assam

Coordinates: 24°48′N 92°45′E

- Division of Assam
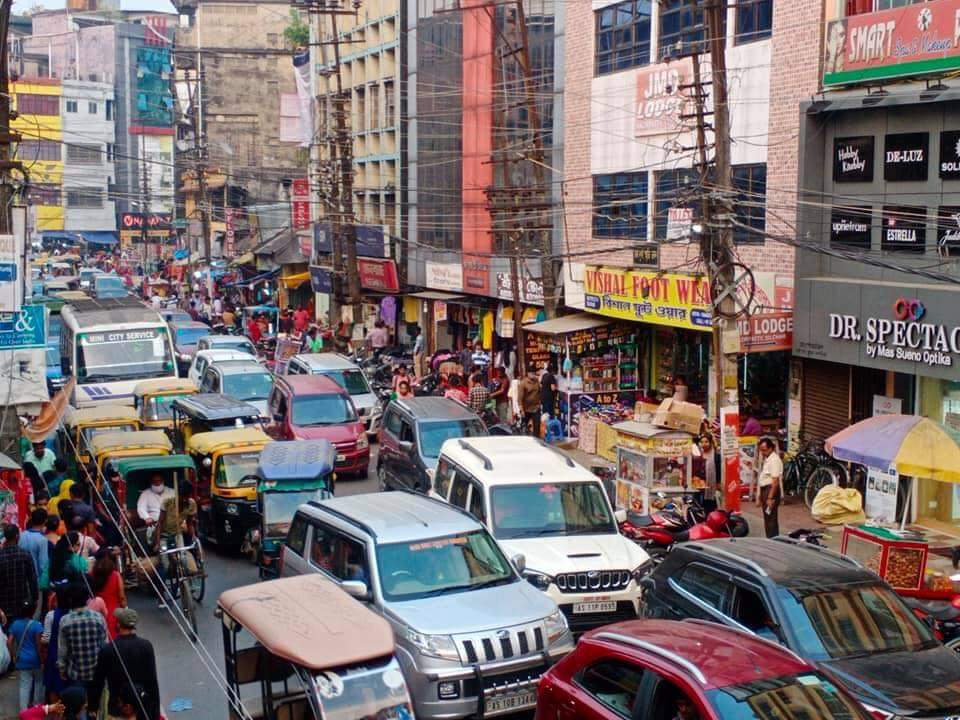
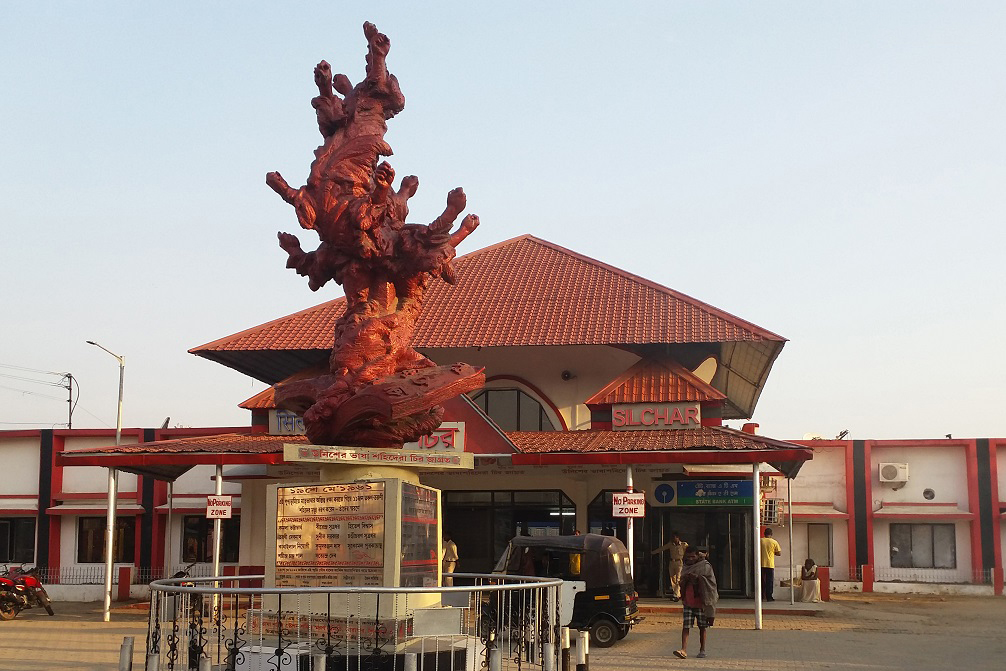
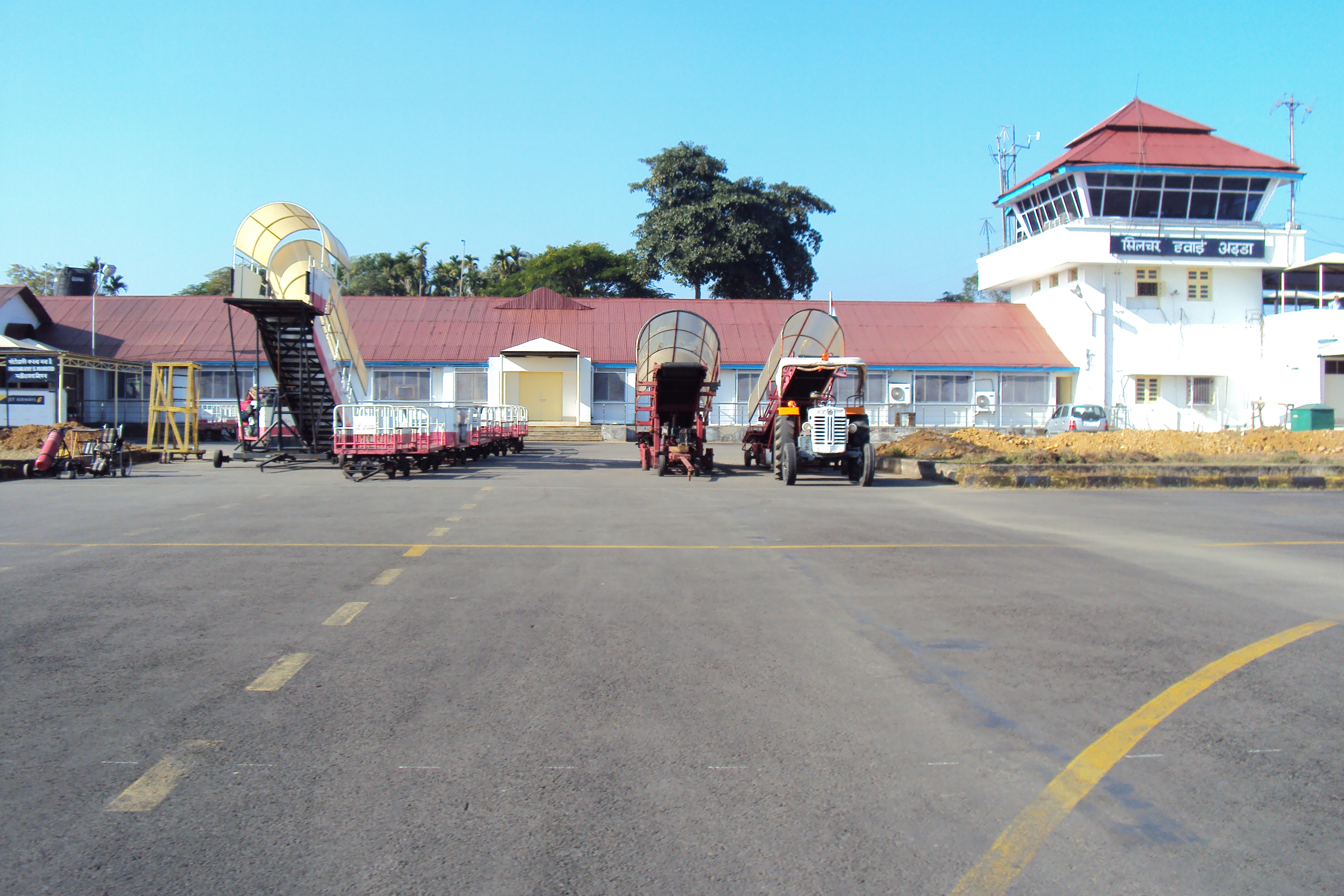
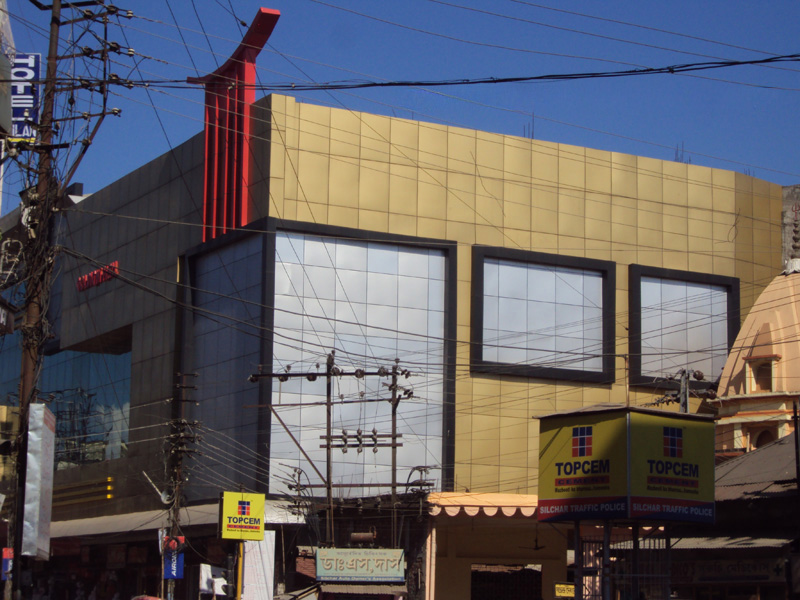
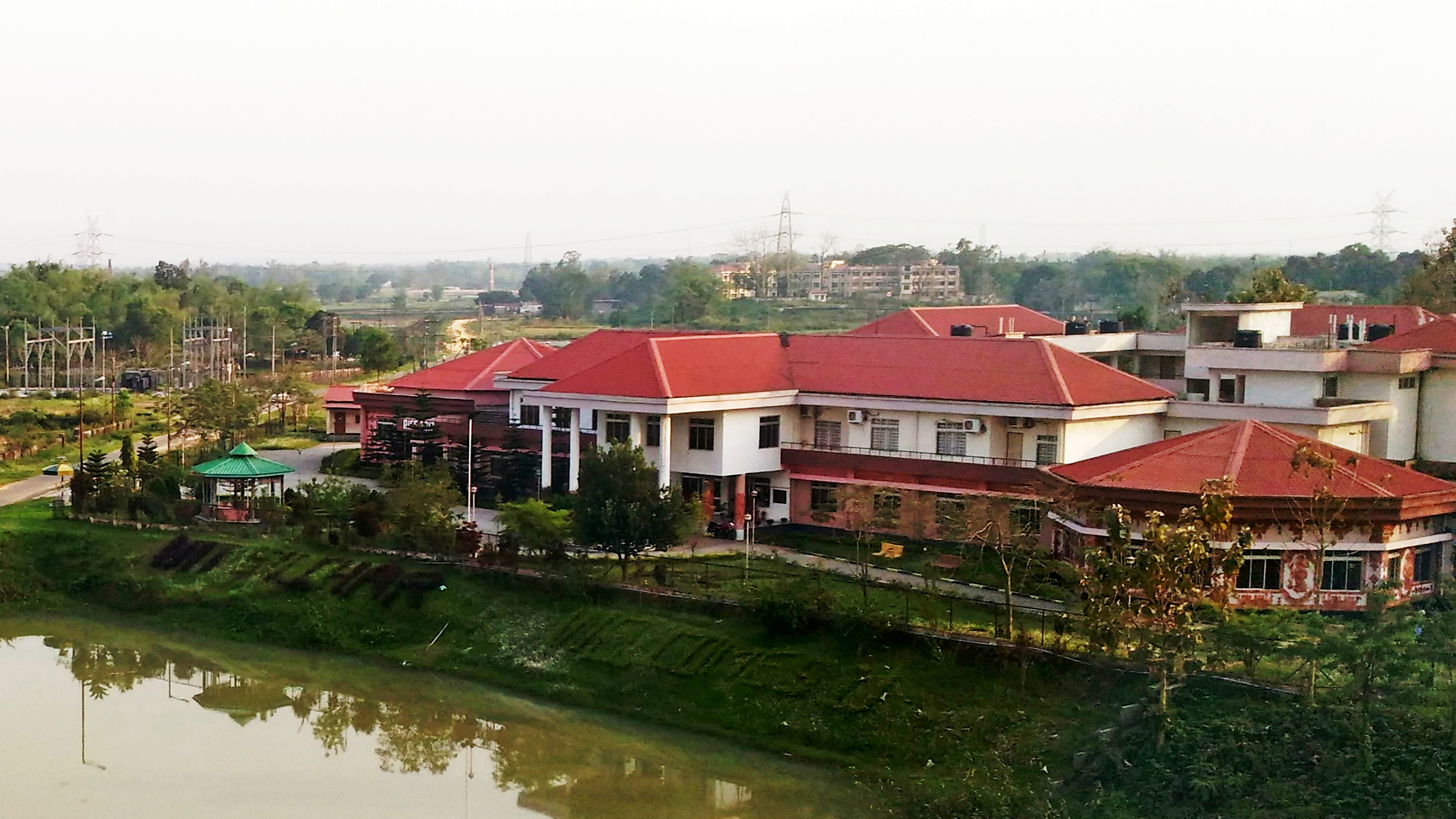
- Clockwise from top: Nazirpatty, Silchar city; Silchar Airport, NIT Silchar, Sribhumi city, Goldighi Mall, Silchar railway station
- Nicknames: "Valley of Peace", "Surma Valley", "Cachar Plains", "Srihatta"
- The Barak Valley division in orange colour
- Country: India
- Region: North Eastern Region (NER)
- State: Assam
- Districts: Cachar; Karimganj; Hailakandi

Government
  - Lok Sabha constituencies: 2
  - Vidhan Sabha constituencies: 15

Area
  - Total: 6,922 km^{2} (2,673 sq mi)

Population (2025)
  - Total: 4,490,000
  - Density: 649/km^{2} (1,680/sq mi)
- Demonym: Barakbashi

Languages
  - Official: Bengali
  - Official script: Bengali–Assamese script
  - Additional official: Meitei
  - Regional: See "§ Languages"

GDP
  - Total (2025-26): ▲$9.6 billion (nominial) ▲$40.43 billion (PPP)
  - Per capita: ▲$2,138 (nominial) ▲$9,004 (PPP)
- Time zone: UTC+5:30 (Indian Standard Time)
- HDI (2023): ▲0.675 (Medium)
- Literacy rate (2024): ▲90%

Barak Valley (Bengali pronunciation: [bɔɾak upɔt̪ːɔka]; Sylheti pronunciation: [bɔɾax uɸɔit̪ːɔxa]) is the southernmost region and administrative division of the Indian state of Assam. It is named after the Barak River, whose watershed roughly forms its northern border. The Barak valley consists of three administrative districts of Assam: Cachar, Karimganj, and Hailakandi. The main and largest city is Silchar, which seats the headquarter of Cachar district and also serves as administrative divisional office of Barak valley division. The valley is bordered by Mizoram and Tripura to the south, Bangladesh and Meghalaya to the west and Manipur to the east respectively. Once North Cachar Hills was a part of Cachar district which became a subdivision in 1951 and eventually a separate district. On 1 July 1983, Karimganj district was curved out from the eponymous subdivision of Cachar district. In 1989, the subdivision of Hailakandi was upgraded into Hailakandi district.

As this Bengali speaking region is situated in the northeastern corner of the greater Bengal, was once identified as "Ishan Bongo"(Northeastern Bengal) in local folklore.

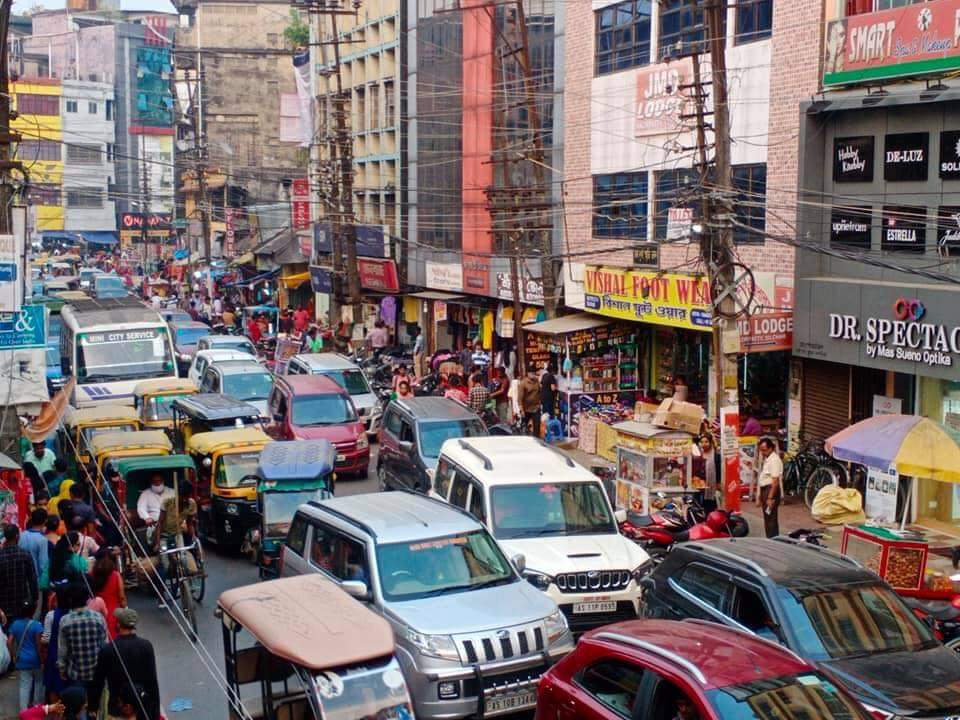
A view of Silchar, the main city of the valley

== Etymology ==
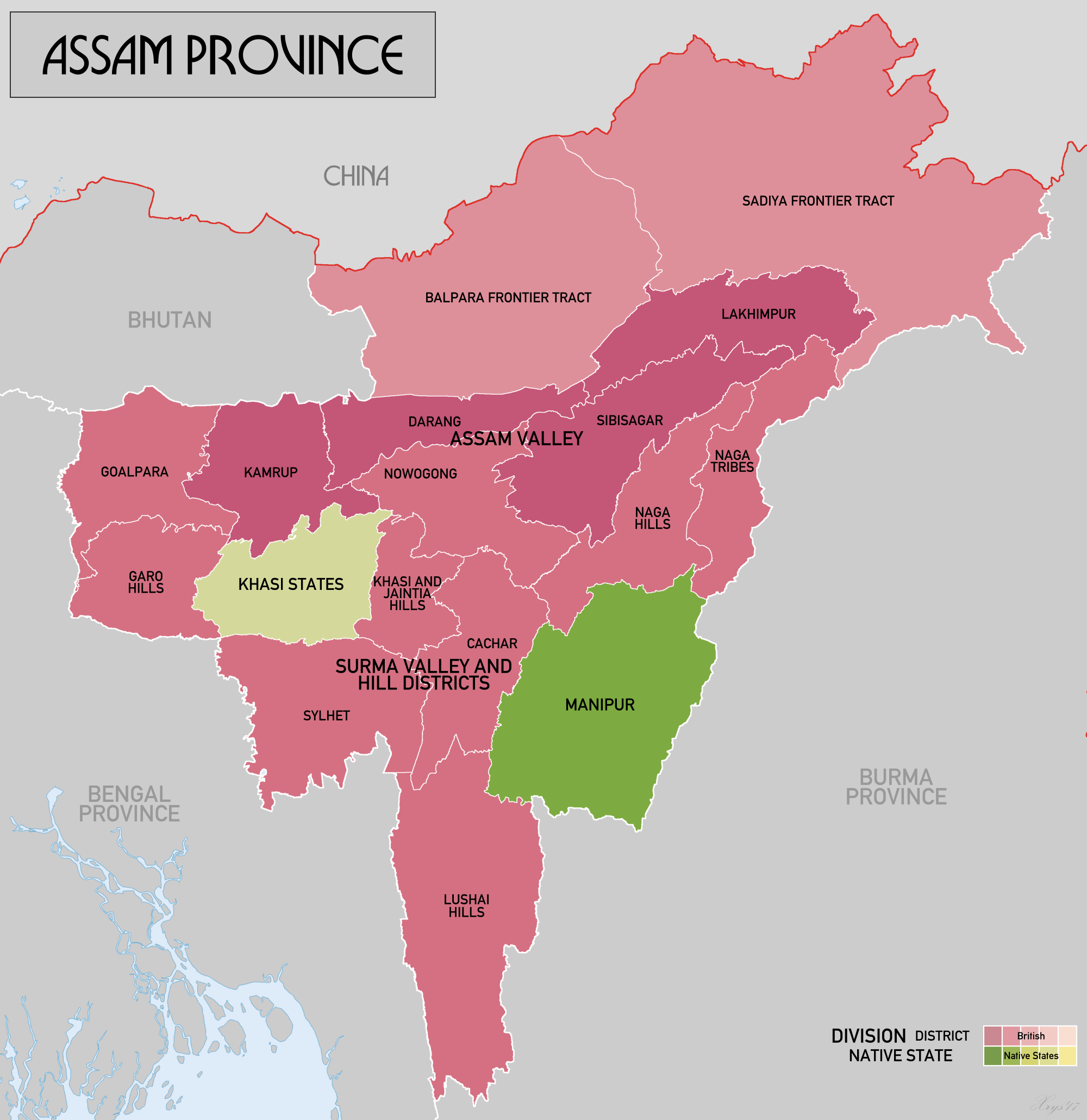
Map showing colonial Undivided Cachar district, which today consist of Dima Hasao, Cachar district, and Hailakandi district. Karimganj district was a subdivision of the colonial Sylhet district.

The name "Barak" is derived from the Dimasa words 'Bra' and 'Kro'. Bra means bifurcation and Kro upper means portion/stream. The river Barak is bifurcated near Haritikar in the Karimganj district in to Surma River and Kushiyara River, respectively. The upstream of this bifurcated river was called "Brakro" by the Barman Kacharis of Cachar plains.

Another origin of the name is that Veraka finds it's mention on the Harikela Coins. Which is identifiable to 'Barak' valley.

Barak valley excluding Karimganj was once part of the Kachari kingdom. Some have suggested the word "Kachar" in Bengali language means a stretch of land at the foot of a mountain and Cachar might have been the name given by Bengalis of Sylhet to the land surrounded by mountains from all the sides. Others have pointed out that the name "Kachari" is widely prevalent in the Brahmaputra Valley and that the Dimasa people were known as "Kachari" even before they came to rule the Cachar plains, suggesting that it was the Dimasa people that gave the name Cachar to the plains.

== Districts ==
Barak valley Division comprises three districts, namely Cachar, Karimganj, and Hailakandi.

Code	District	Headquarter	Population (2011)	Area (km^{2})	Density (/km^{2})
CA	Cachar	Silchar	1,736,319	3,786	460
HA	Hailakandi	Hailakandi	659,296	1,327	497
KR	Karimganj	Karimganj	1,228,686	1,809	680
Total	3	—	3,624,301	6,922	523.59

== History ==
The Barak river today splits into the northern Surma and the southern Kushiara between the towns of Badarpur in the east and Karimganj in the west. Inscriptions suggest that in the 10th century the region around Surma and Kushiara formed frontier settlements called Srihatta and Khanda Kamarupa established by Kamarupa kings in the 7th century. Till 1787, when Brahmaputra changed its course to meet the Meghna a hundred miles farther south, the land between Netrokona in the west and Sylhet in the east was inundated for half of each year forming haors which made the higher plains of the upper Surma-Kushiara basin not as easily accessible from the west as it was from the Cachar plains in the east.

The three districts of the Barak Valley have their own historical origins; nevertheless the region came to be defined not from a natural growth from political, historical or cultural lives of the vernacular groups present in these regions, but as a by-product of colonial empire building under the East India Company (EIC) and the British Raj. The pre-colonial kingdoms were not cartographically defined; they were rather defined according to heartlands and the defense of the margins were not important. Territories were not necessarily contiguous and communities living in different places owing loyalties to different royal lineages implied territories. The EIC interests led to drastically differently defined cartographic territories—for example, it was in the interest of the two contending parties, the Tripura and the Kachari kingdoms, to define a boundary running east to west across the Dalasuri to determine trade and transaction of goods along the river flowing south to north north and to determine whether Hailakandi was in the control of the Tripuri or the Kachari polity; whereas the EIC was more interested in defining a north–south border along the Dalasuri so it could be defended.

=== Pre-colonial formations ===
==== Cachar ====
According to the Bhatera Copper Plate of 1049 AD issued by Govinda-Keasavadeva ruler of the Gour Kingdom (Srihatta-Rajya) ruled parts of Barak Valley. Places like Kalain, Katakhal and Salchapra and Surma river found their mention on the copper plate. The plate also tells us that the lines from 1 to 29 are in Sanskrit. Off the rest lines 29 to 51 are couched in local Bengali Dialect.

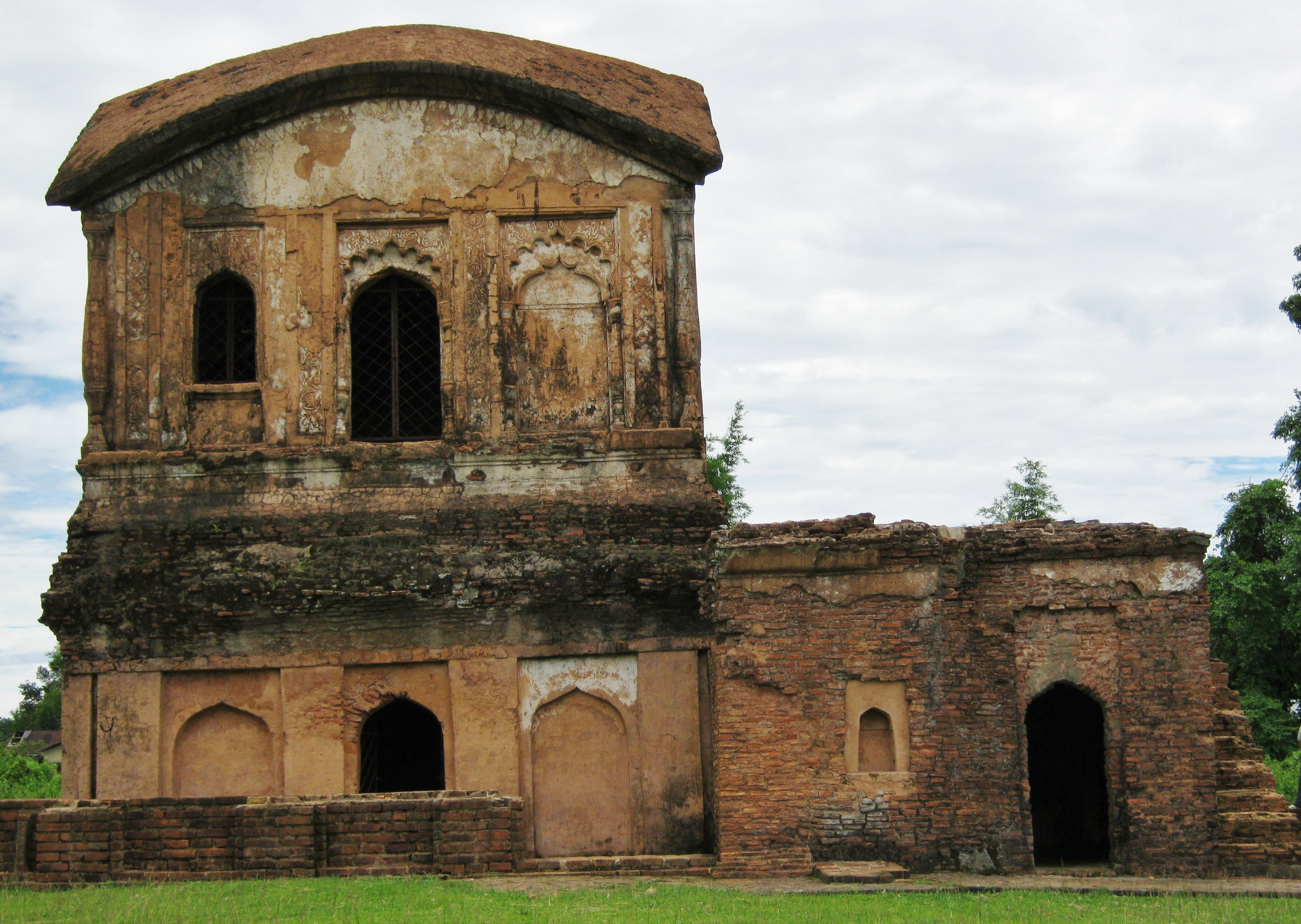
Baroduwar Dimasa Kachari Palace, Khaspur in Cachar dist

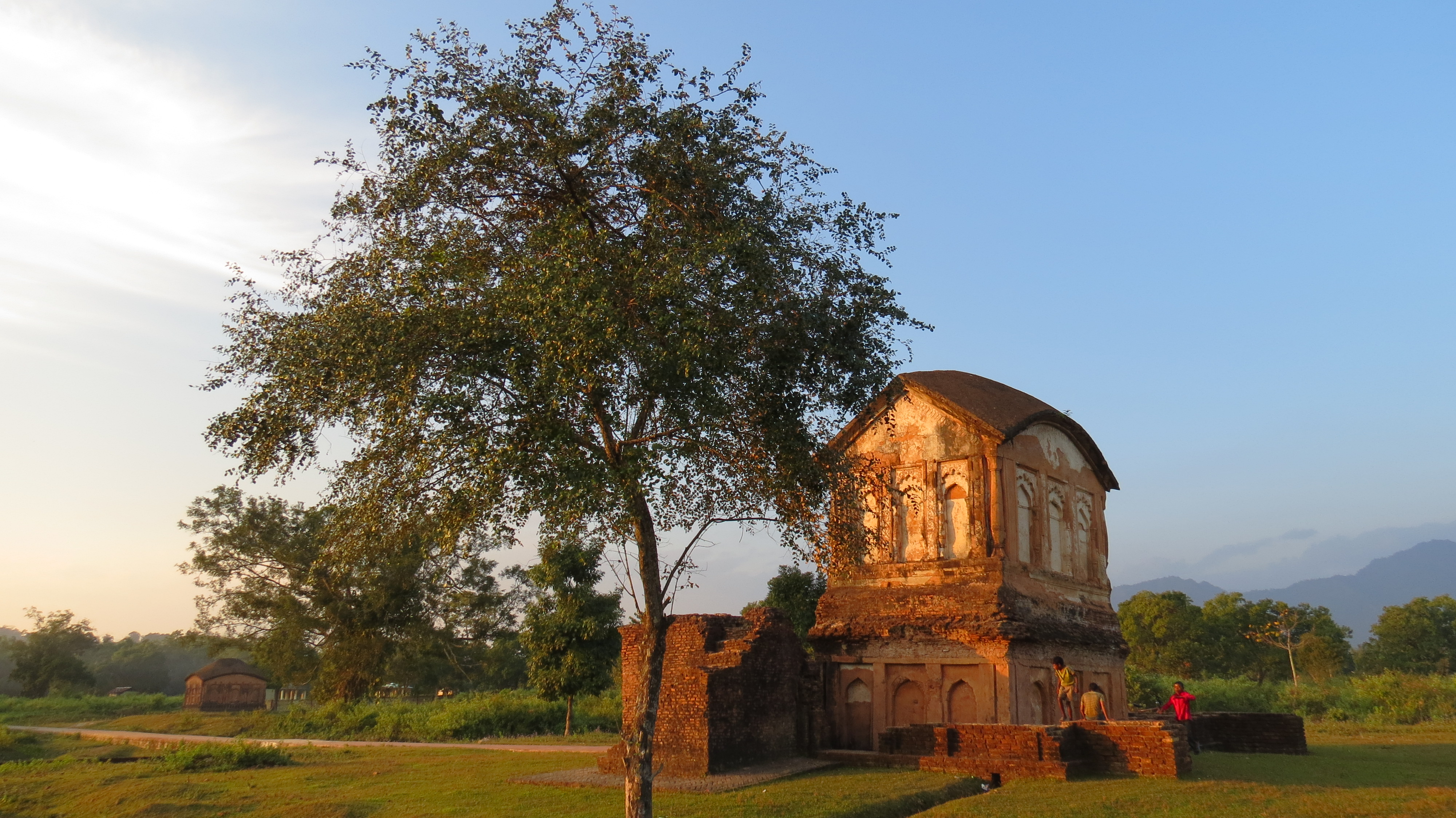
Ruins of Kachari fort near Nayagram

In the 16th century, the Tripura kingdom was in control of the Cachar plains, when in 1562 the Koch general Chilarai annexed the Cachar region to the Koch kingdom and it came to be administered from Khaspur (or Kochpur) by his half-brother Kamalnarayan. After the death of the Koch ruler Nara Narayan, the region became independent and was ruled by the descendants of Kamalnarayan and his group, and they became known as the Dehans (after Dewan) and speak the Dehan dialect of Assamese. Between 1745 and 1755, the last Koch ruler's daughter married the king of the Kachari kingdom, and the rule of Khaspur passed into the hands of the Kachari rulers who adopted the title Lord of Hedamba.

The Kachari kings at Khaspur appointed Brahmins as rajpandits and rajgurus and provided land grants to Muslims from Sylhet for cultivation. Some people from Manipur and the Ahom kingdom too moved to the Cachar plains following disturbances in those lands. In 1835, Pemberton reported that according to Captain Fisher the population of the Cachar plains was around 50,000 dominated by the Dimasa people, followed by Muslim immigrants from Sylhet and their descendants; a third group was Bengali and Assamese immigrants and their descendants and Naga, Kuki and Manipuris forming the smallest groups. On a survey to Cachar in 1832 pemberton also mentioned that people in Sylhet and Cachar are identical in every respect-appearance custom and language.

In 1837 British officer J.G. Burns reported that the population of Cachar plains was 50,000, and only a small portion of the population were Dimasa, majority were Bengali Hindus and Bengali Muslim and a few Manipuris, Nagas and Kukis.

In the census report of 1921, G.T. Lloyd stated that Bengali speakers in Cachar and Goalpara are Indigenous.

==== Hailakandi ====
Hailakandi, claimed by both the Tripura and Kachari kingdoms, was a market town on the banks of the Dalasuri river which connected the resource-rich southern hills with the markets in the north along the Barak river. In 1821-22 when Thomas Fischer surveyed the area, he found that Hailakandi was controlled by the Kacharis, though it was surrounded by villages of the Kuki Tanghum community that owed allegiance to the Tripura kingdom. In this region a past Tripura king received a princess from Manipur. It was uncertain which of the three kingdoms the communities paid their tributes to and it effectively formed a boundary zone, a concept that differed significantly from the idea of clearly defined borders between kingdoms.

==== Karimganj ====
East India Company had pushed into the region east of Sylhet town slowly after it won the right to collect land revenue under the Treaty of Allahabad in 1765. Among these, Karimganj became a sub-division of the eventual colonial Sylhet district which became a part of Assam in 1874. Following a referendum in 1947 Sylhet was attached to East Pakistan during partition of India in the same year, except for four thanas of the erstwhile Karimganj subdivision that was attached to the Cachar district of Assam, India.

Sylhet is farther to the west of Karimganj, also on the Surma. No state control existed in the Sylhet region till the establishment of Sarkar Sylhet when the Mughals established a Faujdar at Sylhet in 1612. In 1303, Shah Jalal had established rule around Sylhet; and during Ibn Battuta's visit in 1346, the region was inhabited by Khasi, Garo, Hindus, Muslims, and others. The Mughals began the practice of settling cultivators in the region around Sylhet, which picked up significantly only after 1719 and lasted till the beginning of East India Company rule in 1765. The expansion of Mughal domains in Sylhet was part of an ancient process of Gangetic territorialism that displaced or assimilated extant populations consisting of Munda, Khasi and other peoples. The Mughal administration granted land in Sarkar Sylhet to talukdars, called Chaudhuri, in smaller land parcels called taluks, as opposed to larger zamindars in the rest of Bengal. Sylhet was itself a borderland when the EIC acquired the Mughal Sarkar Sylhet in 1765.

=== Colonial boundaries ===
EIC acquired Sarkar Sylhet, primarily the frontier town, bounded by regions that were not in their control—Mughal holdouts moved freely in the lowlands controlled by the highland rulers out of Company reach; Khasi chiefs held most of the land north of the Surma; the land north and east of Sylhet town belonged to the Jaintia kingdom; and Tripura kingdom held most of the southern highlands and the adjoining lowlands. The EIC, an erstwhile mercantile company, got into the revenue-farming and judiciary business with the diwani grant of 1765 and developed a keen interest in monopolising traditional trade routes and expanding settled farming for revenue. This was achieved by marking boundaries—company officers served the EIC interests in generating more revenue and confronting Ava militarily, but they also served their own private commercial interests.

According to the 1837 report of British Officer J.G Burns Cacher plains consisted only a small portion of Dimasa population and it was dominated by Bengalis. But according to David R. Syiemlieh, up to 1837 A.D. the plains of Cachar Valley were sparsely populated and were dominated by the Dimasa Cachari, a Tibeto Burmese tribe, under the rule of the Kachari Raja, who have established his kingdom's capital at Khaspur, Cachar plains. He had a good number of Bengali advisers (mostly Brahmins) around him and gave grants of land to some of them, but the population resembled that of the North Cachar Hills of today as evident from various historical chronicles and sources. Bengali settlers from neighbouring East Bengal poured into the Cachar plains after the British annexation of the region in 1832 A.D., turning it into a Bengali-majority region. Once, Barak Valley from (1832–1874) A.D. was a part of the Bengal Presidency under the British Empire. The British Annexation of Cachar transformed the demographic patterns of the valley overnight. There was a sudden phenomenal growth in population, while the plains of Cachar had about 50 thousands inhabitants in all in 1837 A.D. that is five years after its annexation, which eventually indicates that there was a large-scale immigration. The population rose to more than five lakhs a few years later. The population of Muslims in the colonial era Barak Valley decreased in the late 19th century largely because the fertile lands were occupied by earlier settlers of the region and later they immigrated to the present Hojai of Assam which was also a part of Kachari Kingdom up to 1832 AD. A population 85,522 of diverse backgrounds including hill tribes, in the 1851 Census, Muslims and Hindus, 30,708 and 30,573, respectively, mostly Bengalis, constituted 70% of the total population of Cachar Valley, followed by 10,723 Manipuris, 6,320 Kukis, 5,645 Naga and 2,213 Cacharis. Karimganj district, which have become a part of Cachar Valley plains after 1947, was a part of Sylhet before the Partition of Bengal (1947). The region of Karimganj was under the rule of Pratapgarh Kingdom from 1489-1700s.

=== Inclusion of Karimganj ===
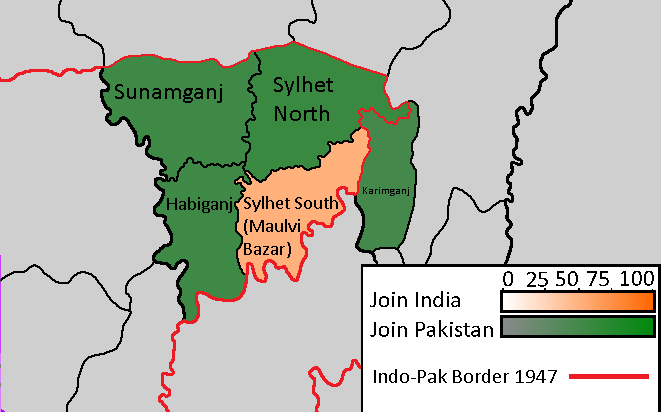
Map of Sylhet District showing subdivisions and majority voting. Green represents area in favour of joining East Bengal (Pakistan) and Orange represents area in favour of remaining part of Assam and joining India

In 1947, when a plebiscite was held in Sylhet of then Assam Province with majority voting for incorporation with Pakistan. The Sylhet district was divided into two; the easternmost subdivision of Sylhet which is known as Karimganj joined with India, and now is a district of Assam, whereas the rest of Sylhet joined East Bengal. Geographically the region is surrounded by hills from all three sides except its western plain boundary with Bangladesh. Nihar Ranjan Roy, author of Bangalir Itihash, claims that "South Assam / Northeastern Bengal or Barak Valley is the extension of the Greater Surma/Meghna Valley of Bengal in every aspect from culture to geography".

Assam's Surma Valley (now partly in Bangladesh) had Muslim-majority population. On the eve of partition, hectic activities intensified by the Muslim League as well Congress with the former having an edge. A referendum had been proposed for Sylhet District. Abdul Matlib Mazumdar along with Basanta Kumar Das (then Home Minister of Assam) travelled throughout the valley organising the Congress and addressing meetings educating the masses about the outcome of partition on the basis of religion. On 20 February 1947 Moulvi Mazumdar inaugurated a convention – Assam Nationalist Muslim's Convention at Silchar. Thereafter another big meeting was held at Silchar on 8 June 1947. Both the meetings, which were attended by a large section of Muslims paid dividend. He was also among the few who were instrumental in retaining the Barak Valley region of Assam, especially Karimganj with India. Mazumdar was the leader of the delegation that pleaded before the Radcliffe Commission that ensured that a part of Sylhet (now in Bangladesh) join with India despite being Muslim-majority (present Karimganj district). In return of that, Moulvibazar the only Hindu-majority district of Sylhet Division was given to East Pakistan during partition.

== Demographics ==
According to the 2011 Indian census, Barak Valley had a population of 3,624,599. Male population is 1,850,038 and female population is 1,774,561. The Literacy rate is 76.27%. The population of Barak Valley is estimated to be over 4,386,089 people for upcoming 2021 census.

Historical Population of Barak Valley
Year	Pop.	±%
1851	85,522	—
1901	630,302	+637.0%
1911	713,566	+13.2%
1921	751,560	+5.3%
1931	803,694	+6.9%
1941	895,140	+11.4%
1951	1,115,865	+24.7%
1961	1,378,476	+23.5%
1971	1,713,318	+24.3%
1981	–	—
1991	2,491,496	—
2001	2,995,769	+20.2%
2011	3,624,599	+21.0%
2021	4,386,089	+21.0%
Source: Census of India

=== Languages ===
Languages spoken in Barak Valley (2011)
1. Bengali (80.8%)
2. Hindi (10.0%)
3. Manipuri (3.49%)
4. Bishnupriya Manipuri (1.38%)
5. Dimasa (0.60%)
6. Tripuri (0.59%)
7. Khasi (0.59%)
8. Odia (0.53%)
9. Nepali (0.14%)
10. Others (1.84%)

Bengali is the official language of Barak Valley and as per the 2011 Indian census report, it is also the most spoken language of the region with approximately 2,930,378 native speakers. Though Bengali is reported as the most spoken in the census, the most commonly spoken language is Sylheti, a language which is considered to be distinct by many but also grouped with Bengali as a dialect. Meitei (also called Manipuri) is the associate official language of the region with 126,498 speakers. Hindi, Bishnupriya and Dimasa are the other most widely spoken languages with 362,459, 50,019 and 21,747 native speakers, respectively. Tripuri, Khasi, Odia, Nepali and Marwari are also spoken by a considerable minority, while 1.84% of the total population speaks other tribal languages.

According to census 2011, the major languages of Cachar district are Bengali, Hindi, Manipuri, Bhojpuri, Bishnupriya Manipuri, Dimasa, Khasi, Hmar and Odia in descending order of population. In the Hailakandi district, the major languages are Bengali, Hindi, Tripuri language, Manipuri and Bhojpuri. In the Karimganj district, the major languages are Bengali and Hindi. (Note: Languages constituting less than 1% and/or substantially lower as compared to the total population are not included)

=== Religion ===
Religions in Barak Valley (2011)
1. Hindus (50.0%)
2. Muslims (48.1%)
3. Christians (1.60%)
4. Other or no religion (0.26%)

Barak's Religious diversity as of the 2011 census
Religion	Population
Hindus	1,812,141
Muslims	1,744,958
Christians	58,105
Others	9,395
Total	3,624,599

District	Hindu	Muslim	Other
Cachar	59.83	37.71	2.46
Karimganj	42.48	56.36	1.16
Hailakandi	38.10	60.31	1.59

Hinduism, by a sliver, is the slight majority religion, while Islam is the second-largest religion in the Valley. The religious composition of the valley population is as follows: Hindus 50%, Muslims 48.1%, Christians 1.6%, and others 0.3%. Hindus are the majority in Cachar district (59.83%) with having (86.31%) Hindu in the district headquarter; Silchar (which is also the main city of the valley). While Muslims are the majority in Hailakandi district (60.31%) and Karimganj district (56.36%), but Hailakandi town have (67.26%) Hindu majority, Karimganj town have also a Hindu Majority of (86.57%) as of 2011 census.

Hinduism is mainly practised by Bengalis, Dimasas, Tripuris, Meiteis, Bishnupriyas, Odias, Nepalis, Biharis and Marwaris living in the Valley. While Islam is overwhelmingly practised by Bengalis, with some small populace of Meitei Pangals, Kacharis and Biharis. Christianity is mainly practised by Tea-garden community, and tribals such as Khasis, Hmar-Mizo, Kukis and Nagas living in the Valley.

=== Population ===
The below are population by district tehsils in 2011:

1. Cachar district total – 1,736,617
  1. Sonai circle – 324,315
  2. Katigora circle – 291,875
  3. Udharbond circle – 124,090
  4. Lakhipur circle – 291,872
  5. Silchar circle – 704,465
2. Hailakandi district total – 659,296
  1. Algapur circle – 121,379
  2. Hailakandi circle – 166,897
  3. Katlichara circle – 168,077
  4. Lala circle – 202,943
3. Karimganj district total – 1,228,686
  1. Badarpur circle – 164,703
  2. Karimganj circle – 278,300
  3. Nilambazar circle – 242,451
  4. Patharkandi circle – 261,368
  5. Ramkrishna Nagar circle – 281,864

== Trends ==
Decadal Hindu and Muslim population of Barak Valley
Year (census)	Hindu population (%)	Muslim population (%)
1951	676,660 (60.63%)	429,496 (38.48%)
1961	821,600 (59.60%)	539,457 (39.13%)
1971	1,005,995 (58.71%)	683,387 (39.88%)
1991	1,381,803 (55.46%)	1,071,872 (43.02%)
2001	1,580,660 (52.76%)	1,362,114 (45.46%)
2011	1,812,141 (50.00%)	1,744,958 (48.1%)

=== Hindu and Muslim population by district tehsils ===
Cachar district tehsils 2011
District Cachar/Tehsils	Hindu population (%)	Muslim population (%)
Sonai circle	133,507 (41.17%)	184,588 (56.92%)
Katigora circle	131,352 (45.0%)	156,290 (53.55%)
Udharbond circle	87,423 (70.45%)	32,320 (26.05%)
Lakhipur circle	178,163 (61.04%)	95,476 (32.71%)
Silchar circle	508,540 (72.19%)	186,142 (26.42%)

Hindus are majority in three tehsils of Cachar district namely Silchar, Lakhipur and Udharbond, while Muslims are majority in Katigora and Sonai circle according to 2011 census.

Hailakandi district tehsils 2011
District Hailakandi/Tehsils	Hindu population (%)	Muslim population (%)
Algapur circle	38,501 (31.72%)	82,126 (67.66%)
Hailakandi circle	47,198 (28.28%)	118,626 (71.08%)
Katlichara circle	79,019 (47.01%)	84,044 (50%)
Lala circle	86,476 (42.61%)	112,857 (55.61%)

Hindus are significant in two tehsils of Hailakandi namely Katlichara and Lala, while Muslims are majority in all the three tehsils, but in Katlichara Muslims form a plurality according to 2011 census.

Karimganj district tehsils 2011
District Karimganj/Tehsils	Hindu population (%)	Muslim population (%)
Badarpur circle	56,800 (34.49%)	106,909 (64.91%)
Karimganj circle	117,877 (42.36%)	159,068 (57.16%)
Nilambazar circle	58,767 (24.24%)	182,567 (75.3%)
Patharkandi circle	129,502 (49.55%)	124,768 (47.74%)
Ramkrishna Nagar circle	159,016 (56.42%)	119,177 (42.28%)

Hindus are majority in two tehsils of Karimganj namely Patharkandi and Ramkrishna Nagar, while Muslims are majority in Nilambazar, Badarpur and Karimganj circle according to 2011 census.

=== Demography of district headquarters ===
Districts headquarters religions (2011)
District/(Headquarters)	Total population	Hindu population (%)	Muslim population (%)	Others
Cachar district/(Silchar)	172,830	154,381 (86.31%)	21,759 (12.17%)	3,310
Hailakandi district/(Hailakandi)	33,637	22,624 (67.26%)	10,686 (31.77%)	327
Karimganj district/(Karimganj)	56,854	49,218 (86.57%)	6,856 (12.06%)	780

== Statehood demand ==
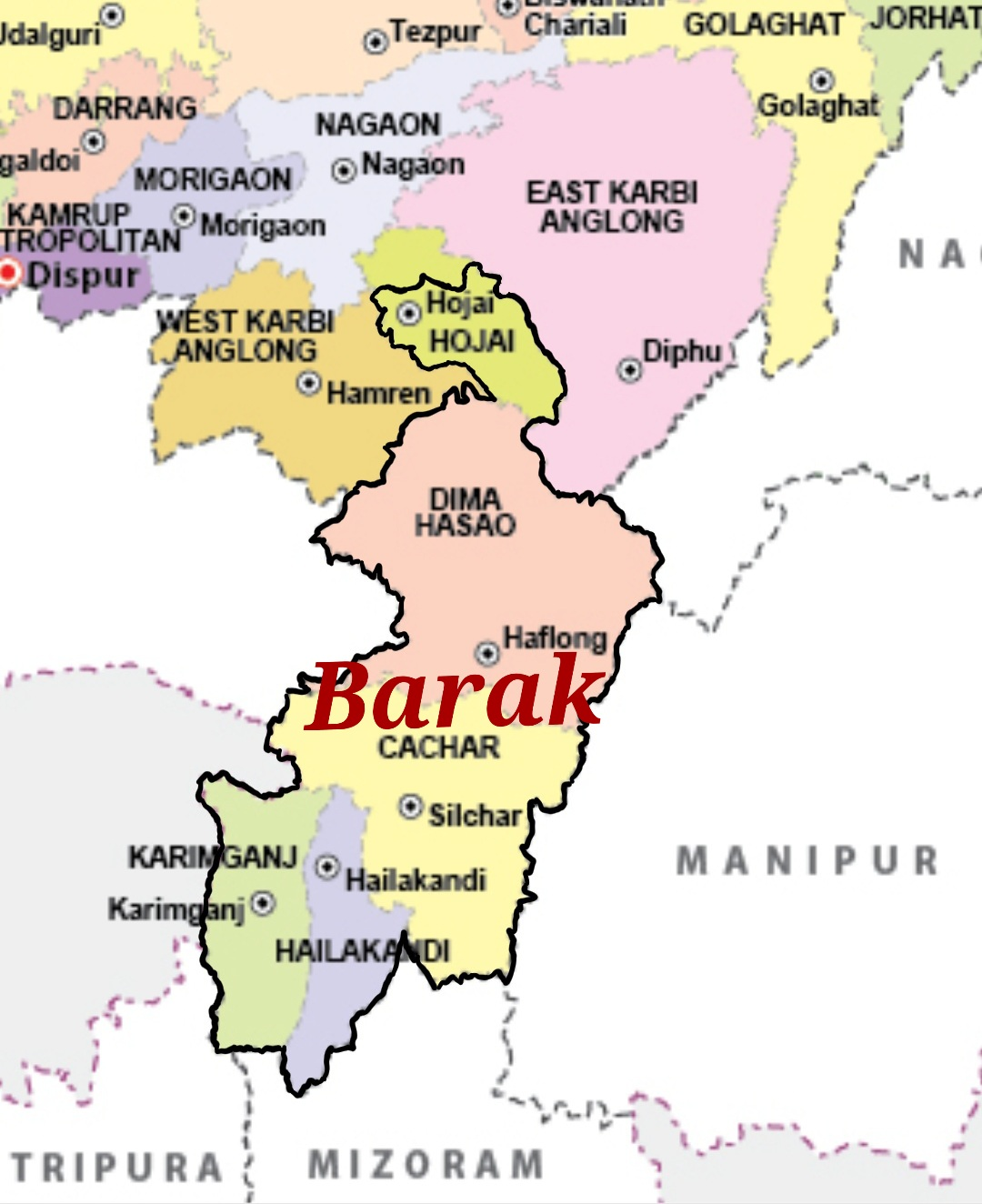
Map representing the proposed Barak state areas as demanded by various Bengali organisations.

Most Bengali organisations of Barak Region have demanded a separate state for the people of Barak within the Bengali majority areas of Assam, particularly Bengali majority Barak valley, comprising the three districts Cachar, Hailakandi, Karimganj, as well as historical Dima Hasao of Undivided Cachar Valley and some parts of Hojai district to meet the criteria for creating a separate state for themselves by carving out from Assam's Assamese majority Brahmaputra valley post NRC. Silchar is the proposed capital of Barak state. Barak Valley is the most neglected part of Assam in terms of its infrastructure development, tourism sector, educational institutions, hospitals, IT industries, G.D.P, H.D.I etc. which is still lagging behind in comparison to the Assam's mainland Brahmaputra valley that has access to all of those facilities mentioned above. On 20 January 2023, Barak Democratic Front's Chief Convenor and former ACKHSA leader Pradip Dutta Roy said, "If Centre is planning to grant separate statehood to Kamtapur, then they should also fulfill the longstanding demand of separate Barak state by granting the region separate statehood". On 7 September 2023, Assam Chief Minister Himanta Biswa Sarma delivered a speech at a rally in Silchar and stated that "If the people of Barak Valley want separation, I will not oppose that demand. Rather the people of Barak Valley should reconsider an independent Barak state." The BDF subsequently conducted a press conference on 8 September 2023 and congratulated the Chief Minister for providing implicit support to the separation call. The southernmost region of Assam that is Barak Valley has an overwhelming Bengali majority population of about 80.8% as per 2011 census report. On 27 September 2023, members of Barak Democratic Front (BDF) held a press conference at the Kolkata Press Club shedding light on the long-standing grievances of Barak Valley residents while attempting to garner support for the creation of a new Purbachal state, separate from Assam. On 29 November 2023, the demand for separate Barak state have been raised before the office of Prime Minister and Home Minister and a memorandum was also submitted by the members of Barak Democratic Front in Parliament of India.

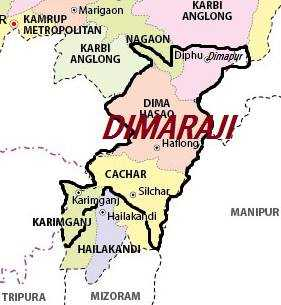
Map representing the proposed Dimaland map.

The indigenous Dimasa Cachari people of Northeast India have been demanding a separate state called Dimaraji or "Dimaland" for several decades. It would comprise the Dimasa-inhabited areas, namely North Cachar Hills, greater parts of Cachar district, Hailakandi district, significant parts of Hojai district and Karbi Anglong district in Assam together with part of Dimapur district in Nagaland.

== Festivals ==
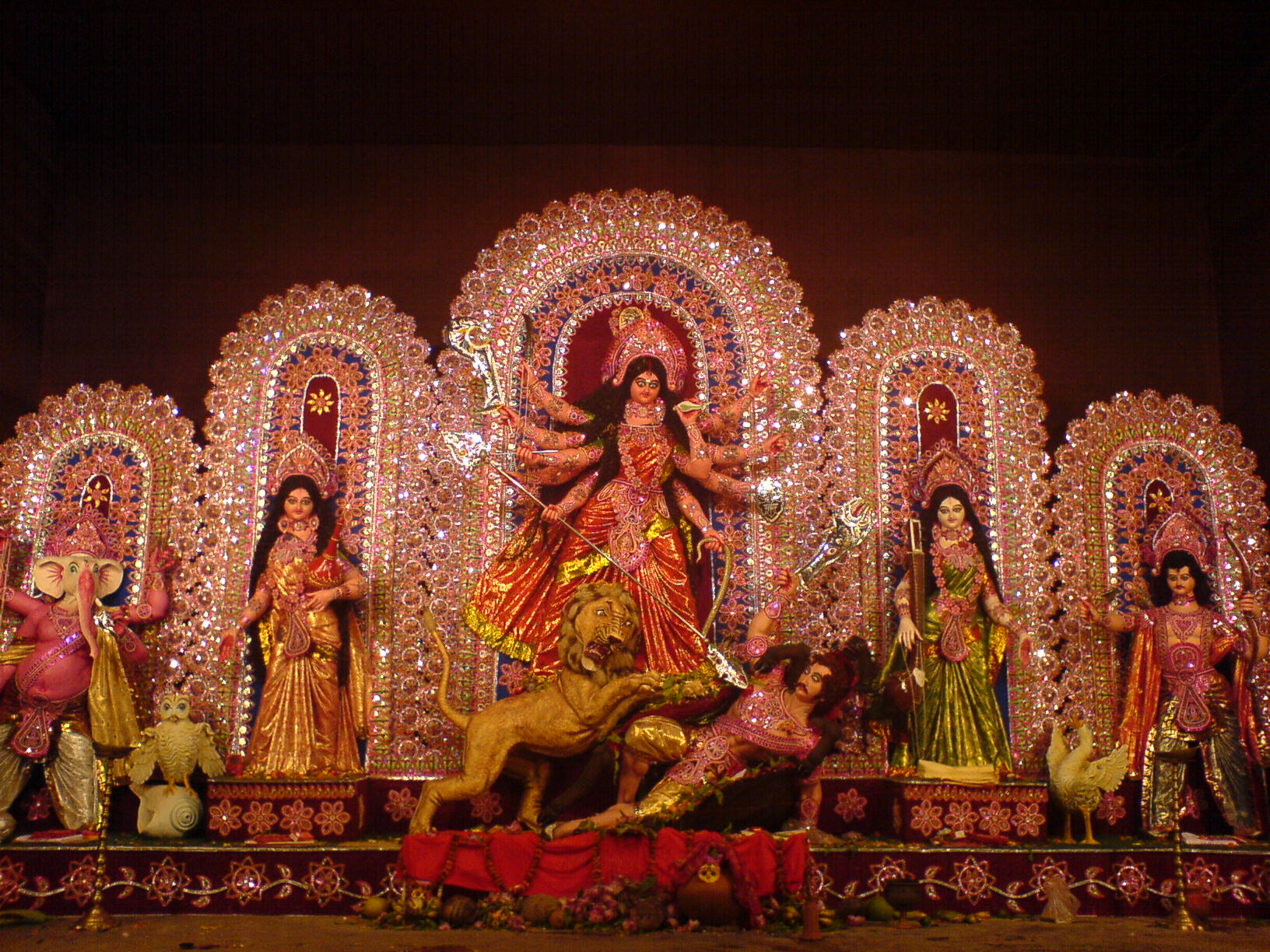
Durga puja celebration in Barak Valley, 2022

Durga puja is one of the major festivals of Barak valley, as the region is home to a large population of Bengalis in Assam. Durga puja is celebrated with great fervour and enthusiasm in every part of the region be it rural or urban areas with great joy and happiness. Annually, on average 2,500 puja pandals have been organised by puja committees throughout the valley, with 300 durga puja pandals are being concentrated in Silchar alone. The festival marks the victory of good over evil.

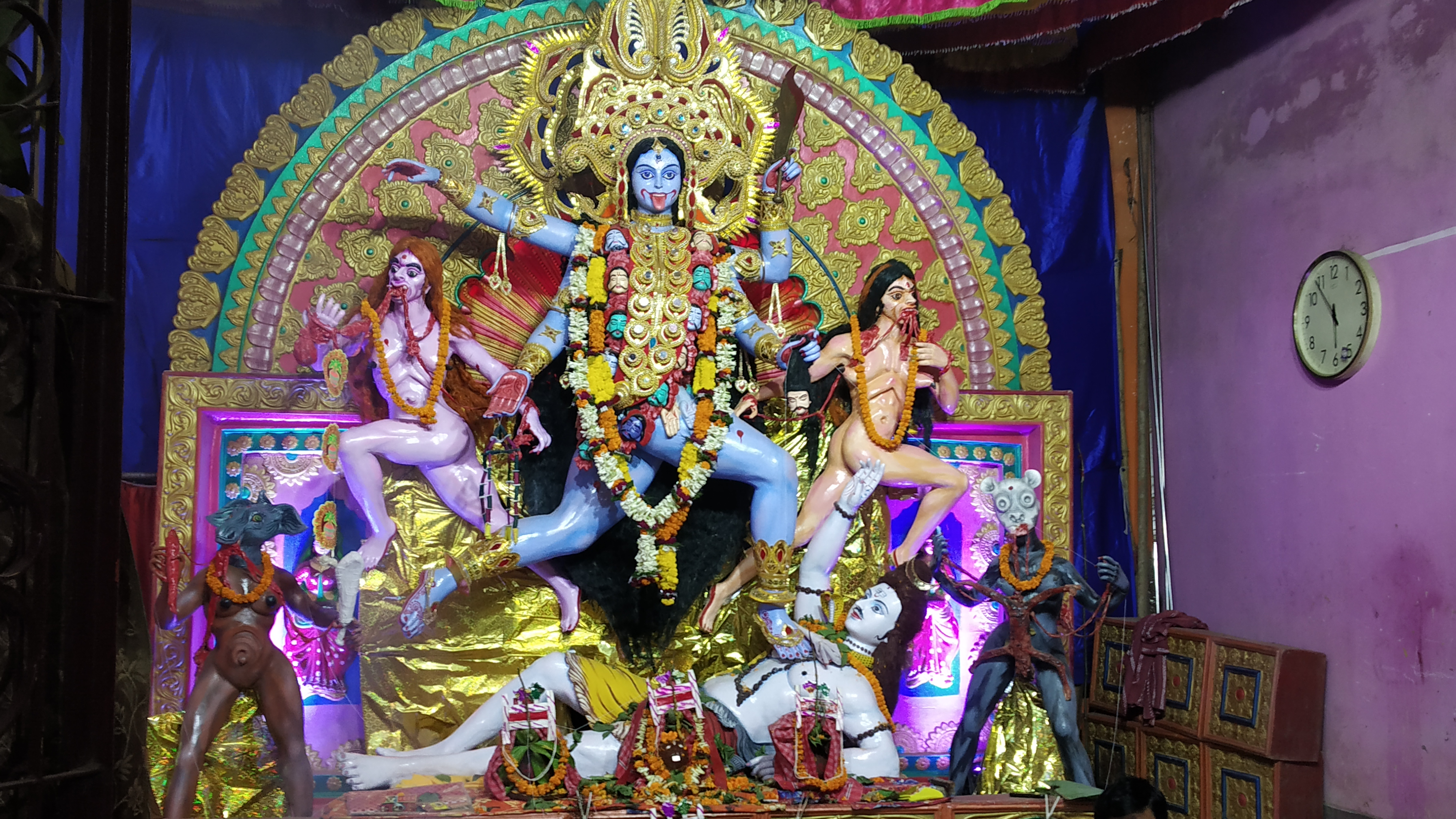
A Kali Puja Pandal in Hailakandi, Barak Valley, 2018

Kali Puja is one of the most celebrated festivals in the valley after Durga Puja. Every year around 2000 Puja pandals are built in the region to mark the beginning of this festival and to seek the blessings of the goddess Kali for general happiness, health, wealth and peace through prayers

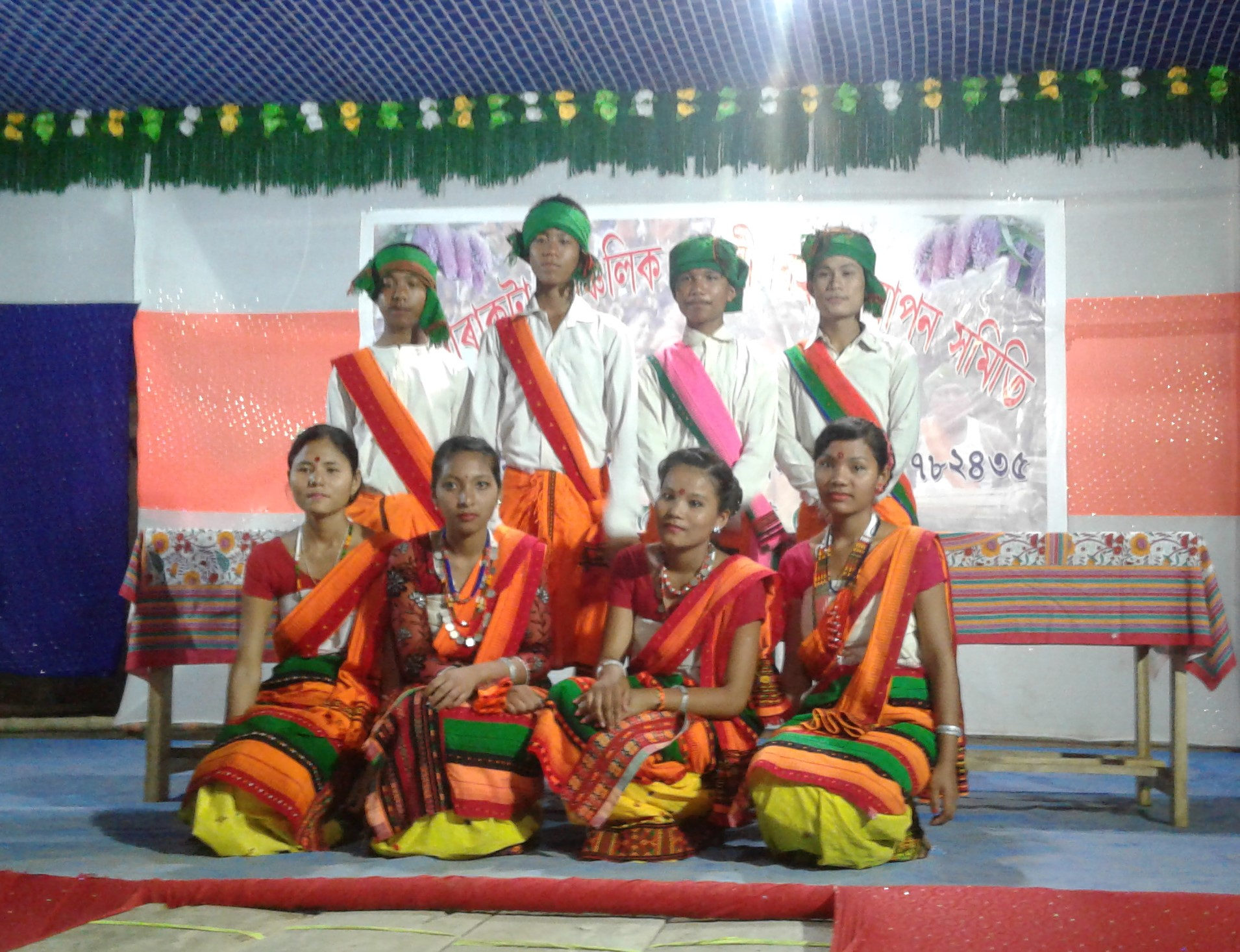
Bishu dimasa festival of Un-divided Cachar Valley

Busu Dima is an annual cultural festival celebrated by the Dimasa Kachari tribe of North Cachar Hills and Cachar of Barak valley. It is the biggest harvesting agricultural festival. It is celebrated after the completion of grain harvest in different villages of the valley and hills. The festival is usually organised in the month of January.

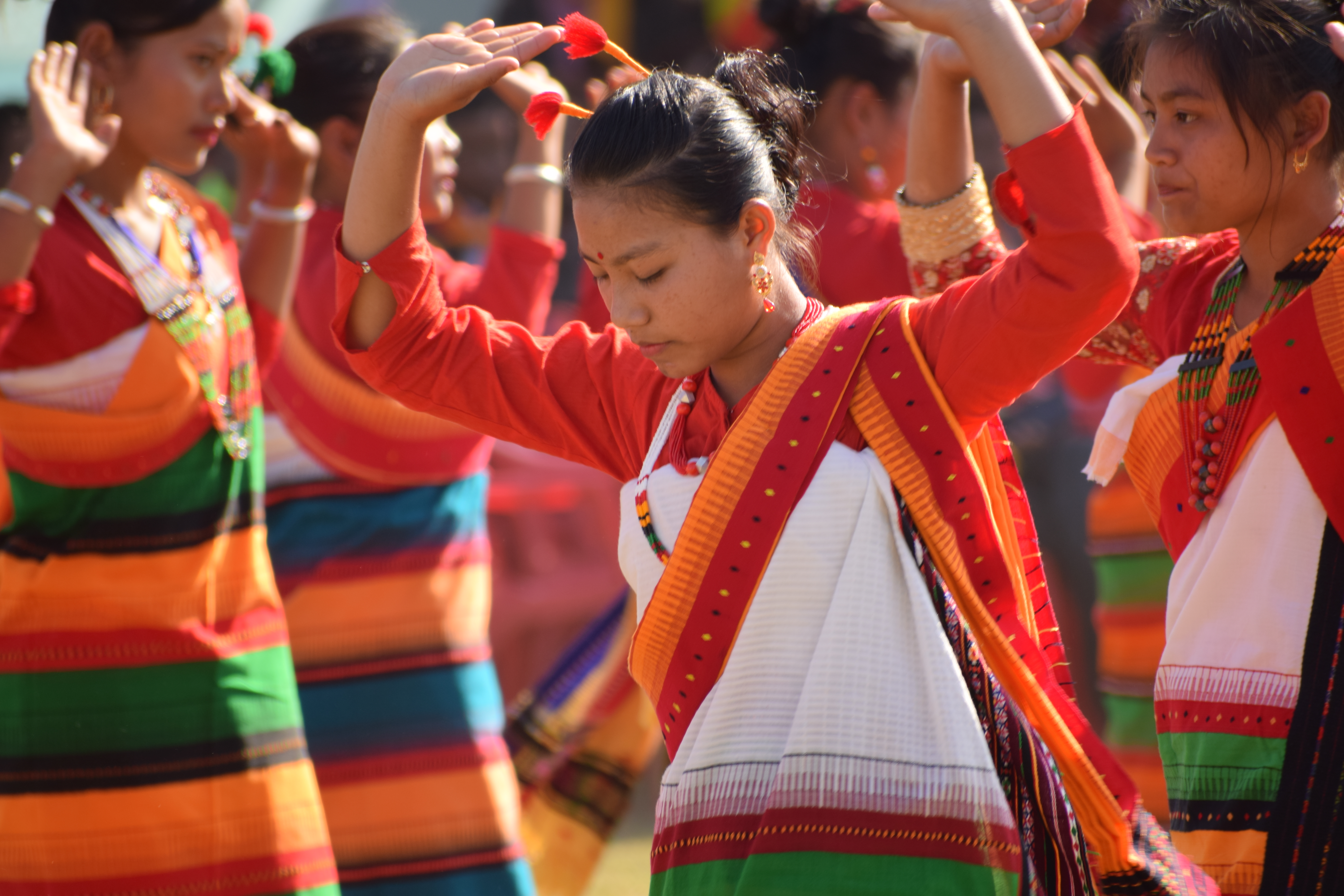
Barman Dimasa girl while performing Baidima, the traditional dance of Dimasa Cachari tribe

Baidima is a tradition festival of Indigenous Dimasa Cachari tribe of North Cachar Hills and Cachar. It is being celebrated in the month of January just after Busu Dima festival. The traditional dance continued for a week. On that day, along with dance they also sing songs. In haflong, locals organised cultural events, public meetings, rally and various programs related to this festival.

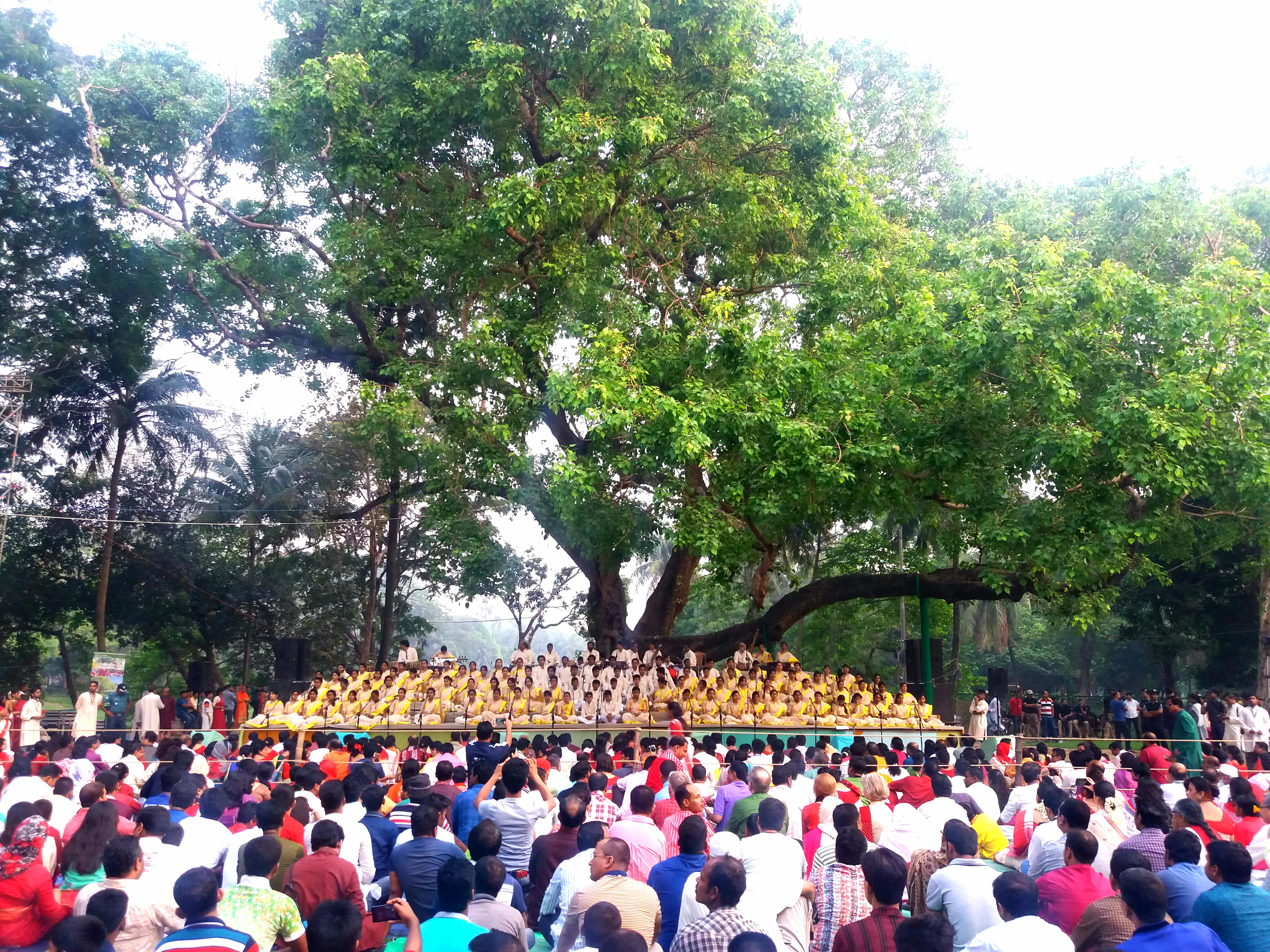
The Bengali new year salutation at Ramna Park, Silchar

Charak puja (Pohela Boishakh) the Bengali new year, is one of the most important and major festivals of the valley celebrated by the ethnic Bengalis, irrespective of their religious affiliation and social status. This festival marks the beginning of Bengali new year and is being celebrated 15 April every year.

=== Eid ===
Eid is also a major festival of the region as the Muslims constitute half of valley's population. Just like Durga puja, every year lakhs of Muslims celebrated eid with great joy and happiness throughout the valley specially in Muslim-majority Karimganj and Hailakandi district.

== Social issues ==
=== Bengali Language Movement in Barak Valley ===
Statue dedicated to martyrs of Bengali Language movement of Barak Valley, located in Udharbond, Cachar

Over 80 per cent of Assam's Barak Valley are Bengali people and speak Bengali language. On 24 October, a bill was passed by Assam's late Chief Minister Mr. Bimala Prasad Chaliha in the Assam Legislative Assembly making Assamese as the only sole official language of the state. On 5 February 1961, the Cachar Gana Sangram Parishad was formed to protest against the imposition of Assamese in the Bengali-speaking Barak Valley. Rathindranath Sen was chief person of the organisation. People soon started protesting in Silchar, Karimganj and Hailakandi. On 24 April, the Parishad flagged off a fortnight-long Padayatra in the Barak Valley to raise awareness among the masses, which ended after 200 miles reaching to Silchar on 2 May. On 18 May, the Assam police arrested three prominent leaders of the movement, namely Nalinikanta Das, Rathindranath Sen and Bidhubhushan Chowdhury, the editor of weekly Yugashakti. On 19 May, the dawn to dusk hartal started. Picketing started in the sub-divisional towns of Silchar, Karimganj and Hailakandi. A Bedford truck carrying nine arrested activists from Katigorah was fired and the truck driver and the policemen escorting the arrested fled the spot. Soon after that the paramilitary forces, guarding the railway station, started beating the protesters with rifle butts and batons without any provocation from them. They fired 17 rounds into the crowd. Twelve persons received bullet wounds and were carried to hospitals. Nine of them died that day. Two more persons died later. One person, Krishna Kanta Biswas survived for another 24 hours with a bullet wound in chest. Ullaskar Dutta send nine bouquets for nine martyrs. On 20 May, the people of Silchar took out a procession with the bodies of the martyrs in protest of the killings. After the incident and more protests, the Assam government had to withdraw the circular and Bengali was ultimately given official status in the Barak region by Assam government. Soon after that a circular of Section 5 of Assam Language Act XVIII, 1961, was enacted to safeguards the use of Bengali language in the Cachar district. It says, "Without prejudice to the provisions contained in Section 3, the Bengali language shall be used for administrative and other official purposes up to and including district level."

=== Language controversy ===
On 18 October 2021, a state government hoarding which was written in Assamese language has been found smeared with black ink in Barak valley's administrative capital Silchar's Petrol Pump area. It was found that two Bengali organisations namely: Barak Democratic Yuba Front and All Bengali Students Youth Organisation have been involved in that activity and have accused that the government of Assam has been trying to impose their Assamese language on us (referring to Bengali-majority Barak Valley) through Assamese hoarding as a starting and have said that "We strictly stands against it (i.e imposition)". The smearing of the government hoarding has led to condemnation from people and various regional organisations of the Brahmaputra Valley, where Assamese organisations such as All Assam Students Union and Asom Jatiyatabadi Yuba Chatra Parishad have severely reacted, deeply saddened and protested against it. In retaliation, several Bengali hoardings in Assamese-dominated Brahmaputra Valley have also meet the same fate. The political 'language wars' and strife between the ethnic Assamese and Bengalis have led to several 'martyrs' on both sides of the administrative divisions. On 19 May 1961, 11 Bengali Protestors at Silchar railway station were killed for protesting against forceful imposition of Assamese language in Barak Valley region. Similarly, during Assam Movement of (1979–1985) or popularly known as the Assam Agitation which aims at detaining and deporting Illegal Bangladeshi immigrants from the state saw as many as 855 Assamese people gave up their lives to protect the Linguistic, ethnic and cultural identity of Assam.

=== Immigration of Bengali refugees in Cachar Valley ===
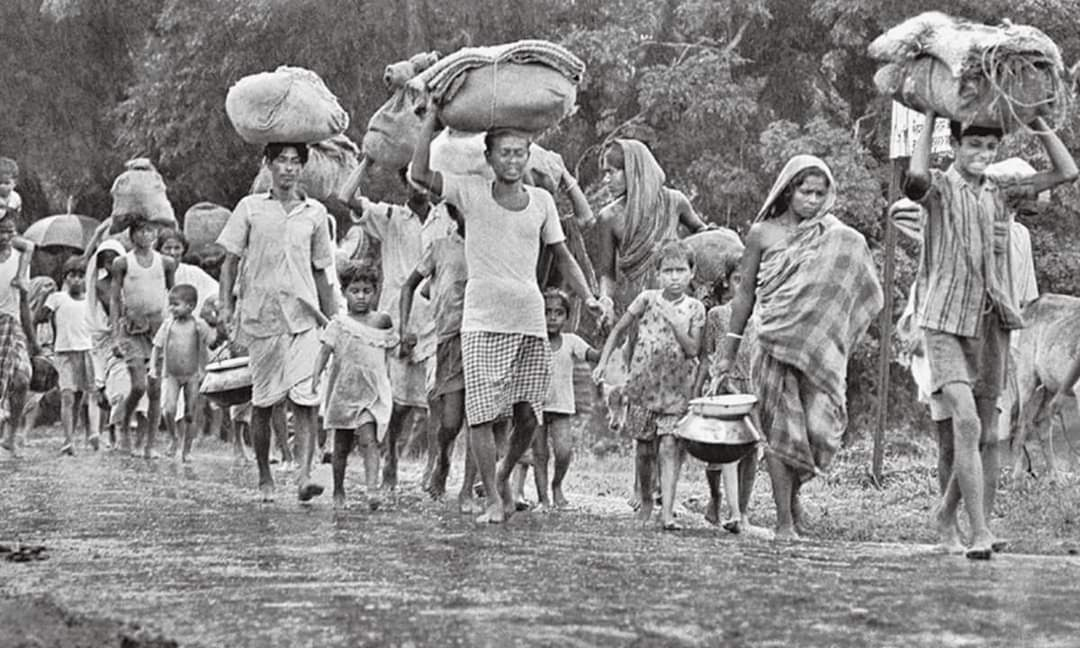
(East Pakistan's Bengali Hindus of Sylhet Division coming to Barak's Cachar district as refugees, 1947)

In 1947 during Partition of Bengal period, it has been found that from 15 August 1947 to April 1950, the Bengali Hindu refugees population in Cachar increased to 200,000 and but after Liaquat–Nehru Pact it came down to 93,177 in 1951. According to 1961 census, the number of East Bengali refugees living in Cachar alone is found to be 156,307 which is way higher than the previous census. No new Hindu immigration happened in the post 1971 period in Barak valley. Bengali Hindus who landed up in Barak valley from Bangladesh in the post 1971 census have moved out of the region before the 1991 census. The number of Hindu immigrants from Bangladesh in Barak Valley has varied estimates. According to the Assam government, 1.3–1.5 lakh such people residing in the Barak Valley are eligible for citizenship if the Citizenship Amendment Act of 2019 becomes a law.There were reverse im-migration vice-versa trends as well. The Muslim percentage of the Cachar Valley have decreased from 42.48% to 38.49% during (1941–1951) period. On the eve of Partition of Bengal and Sylhet Referendum, most of Bengali Muslim employees hailing from Barak Valley opted for Pakistan's Sylhet and migrated there as refugees. Similarly, Bengali Hindu employees hailing from Sylhet opted for Cachar Valley and majority of them settled in the Cachar plains thereafter. Also during partition, most of the Sylhet-origin Muslim businessmen living in Cachar and Karimganj have exchanged their business, houses and residences with Hindu businessmen of Sylhet migrating to Cachar and Karimganj.

In March 2020, Wasbir Hussain, the editor in chief of North East Live and member of clause 6 committee while defining who is an Assamese have stated that the original inhabitants of Barak valley are a part of greater Assamese society and he further said that illegal immigrants and migrants are of different bracket. Regarding Indigenousity, Those Bengali-speaking Hindus/Muslims of Barak Valley (comprising districts of Cachar, Hailakandi and Karimganj) who bears surnames like Choudhury, Mazumdar/Mazumder, Laskar/Lashkar, Barlaskar, Barobhuiya, Mazarbhuiya, Talukdar and Hazari and other regular titles mostly brought and given by Kachari kings are Native. The Barak Valley region is often described as a division filled with Bangladeshis. It lost its "Bangladeshi tag" after the final NRC draft results were published on 31 July 2018. Mr. Paul, a resident of Cachar district, said that the latest NRC draft had put an end to the controversy regarding the citizenship of the residents of the Valley. He further said: "It was often claimed that they are all or the majority of people of the valley are from Bangladesh. NRC draft results have shown that nearly 90% of Barak residents are Indian citizens. The Barak Valley had a population of about 37 lakh, as per last 2011 Census. NRC draft have dropped four lakh of the 37 lakh residents, majority of whom are Bengali people. As per NRC results, about 8% of the residents of Cachar, 11.82% of Karimganj and 14.2% of Hailakandi didn't feature their names on the latest final draft list. As a whole, about 11% residents of Barak could not make their name appears on the list. The Assam Indigenous People Protection Committee has protested the exclusion of indigenous people in the final NRC list, which was published on 31 August 2019 in Assam's Barak Valley region. According to the Committee, nearly 1.5 lakh people belong to the Dimasa, Koch Rajbongshi, Meiteis, Manipuri-Muslim (Pangals), Bishnupriya Manipuri, Cachari-speaking Muslim, tea tribes, Naga people (particularly Rongmei), Kuki, Khasi, Gorkha, Hmar, Das Pattni, Nath Jogi and Namasudra Bangali communities were left out of the final NRC list. The Committee further stated that, "All the Indigenous people of Barak Valley support the government stand of Implementing Clause 6 of the Assam Accord". One of the early attempts to define the native people of Assam is found in the 1951 Census of Assam. It's clearly stated that "An Indigenous person of Assam means a person belonging to the State of Assam and speaking the Assamese language or any tribal languages- (Dimasa, Rabha, Koch Rajbongshi, Bodo, Mishing, Karbi etc.) of Assam, or in the case of Cachar Valley, the language of the region (Bangla)".

=== Barak-Mizoram dispute ===
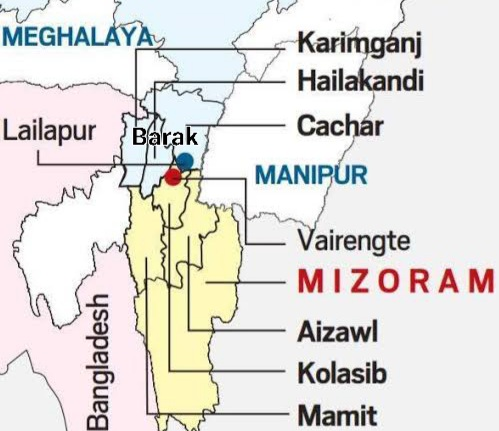
An image representing Assam's Barak and Mizoram border disputed land areas

Mizoram used to be a district of Assam as Lushai hills before being carved out as a separate union territory and later, becoming another separate state in 1987 by States Reorganisation Act, 1956. Because of the history, the district's borders did not really matter for local Mizos for a long time. Mizoram shares a border with the districts Cachar, Hailakandi and Karimganj which comes under Barak valley region of Assam.

Over time, the two states started having different perceptions about where the demarcation should be. While Mizoram wants it to be along an Inner Line Permit notified in 1875 to protect indigenous tribals from outside influence, which Mizos feel is part of their historical homeland, Barak valley region of Assam wants it to be demarcated according to district boundaries drawn up much later. Conflicting territorial claims have persisted for long between Assam's Barak and Mizoram, which share a 164.6 km inter-state border. There were several clashes between the local people of the Mizoram and Barak regarding land disputes in the border areas on regular basis. The root of the dispute is a 1,318 km^{2} ( 509 square miles) area of hills and forests that Mizoram claims as its own. This is on the basis of an 1875 British law. But Assam insists this area is part of theirs as its "constitutional boundary". On 17 November 2022, Mizoram Home Minister have apologised for the clashes that have occurred in Barak-Mizoram border in which six police personnel and one civilian were killed in Lailapur.

=== Communal Tensions ===
Barak valley has witnessed many major communal riots since 1960's to the most recent 2021 Hailakandi riots.

Lists of riots involving communalism in Barak valley region:

Karimganj riot (1968)

In the 1968 Karimganj riots, a cow belonging to a Muslim wandered into a Hindu house. When a Hindu boy tried to chase the cow, some Muslims beat him up. Soon after that clashes erupted between the two communities. The ensuing riot claimed 82 lives.

Hailakandi riot (1990)

In October 1990, a wounded cow was found near a common land, which led to clashes between Hindus and Muslims. Police records reveal that the Hindus of Hailakandi had demanded that parcel of land to construct a Kali temple. In fact, Sangh Parivar had earlier organised pujas to ritually purify bricks for shilayas at Ayodhya on the common land. The appearance of an injured cow hurt their sentiments and led to a riot resulting in many casualties.

Silchar riot (2013)

In 2013, rumours of beef being found in a temple in Silchar sparked Hindu Muslim clashes in which at least 30 people were injured.

Silchar riot (2015)

In 2015, there was tension yet again when the head of a slaughtered cow was found in a temple in Silchar. On the same year, allegations of "love jihad" – a term used by Hindu groups to allege a conspiracy by Muslim men to marry women from other religions solely to convert them to Islam – sparked violent clashes in the city area.

Silchar riot (2017)

On 7 June 2017, Clashes broke out between two communities in the Silchar city of Assam's Cachar district on Tuesday evening. The incident took place in the Janigunj area of Silchar. According to police 11 civilians and eight police officials were injured in large scale stone pelting. However, there were no casualties in the incident.

Hailakandi riot (2019)

Local reports said that the tension started when motorbikes owned by Muslim devotees were vandalised while they were praying inside a mosque. The motorbike owners lodged a first information report and demanded that the police take action against the accused and said that they will offer prayers on the road if action was not taken. Mohneesh Mishra, Hailakandi's police chief, told Scroll.in that the clashes began when a group of Muslim men assembled on a public road in the town and said they will offer prayers on the street. "The Hindu community tried to stop them and that led to an argument and soon after that it turned into riot," said Mishra, while adding that heavy security had been deployed in the area. At least 14 people were injured out of which 3 were police Constables and also 1 was killed in a communal clash in Hailakandi district in Assam which have occurred on 10 July 2019.

Hailakandi riot (2021)

Tension began at Hailakandi's Serispore Tea Garden area after an e-rickshaw driver who happened to be a Muslim and his passengers (who were all Hindus) entered into an argument. After this confrontation, people from two separate groups gathered at the site and started attacking each other. Soon after that, a curfew was imposed. As per as A.H Laskar a police of Hailakandi police station, both parties were throwing stones at each other.

== Economy ==
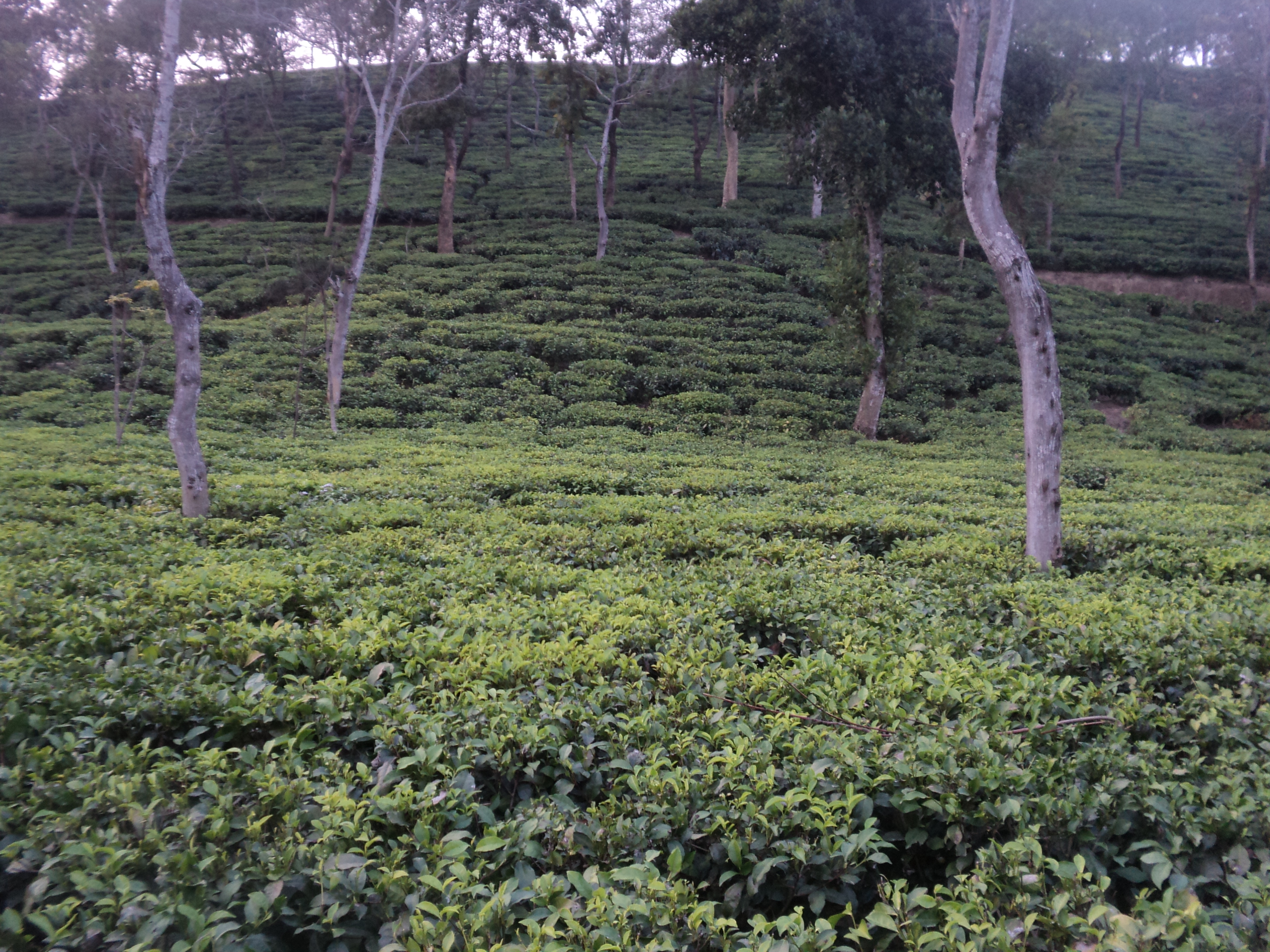
A tea garden in Cachar district

Tea is the important economic activity and Barak Valley have also its proportional share of tea garden in comparison to Brahmaputra valley to sustains its economy from time to time. There are plenty of oil and natural gas under the surface of Barak valley as well to run the economy as a separate state. Various oil refineries are also set up in various locations of Barak valley to meet the required economic demand. Jute is an important crop grown in this region. The per capita income of Cachar is Rs. 19,551, for Hailakandi it stands at Rs. 19,055 and for Karimganj it is Rs. 20,093 respectively. Barak Region as a whole have a per capita income of Rs. 58,699 which is lower than in most of Assam.

== Poverty ==
Barak valley region is the poorest part of Assam in terms of Gross Domestic Product and Human Development Index rank. More than half of the region's population lives in absolute poverty. According to a survey, 51% of the population of Hailakandi district, 42.4% of the population of Cachar district and 46% of the population of Karimganj district are multi-dimensionally poor and don't have proper access to safe drinking water, food, electricity, housing and shelter etc.

== Forest cover ==
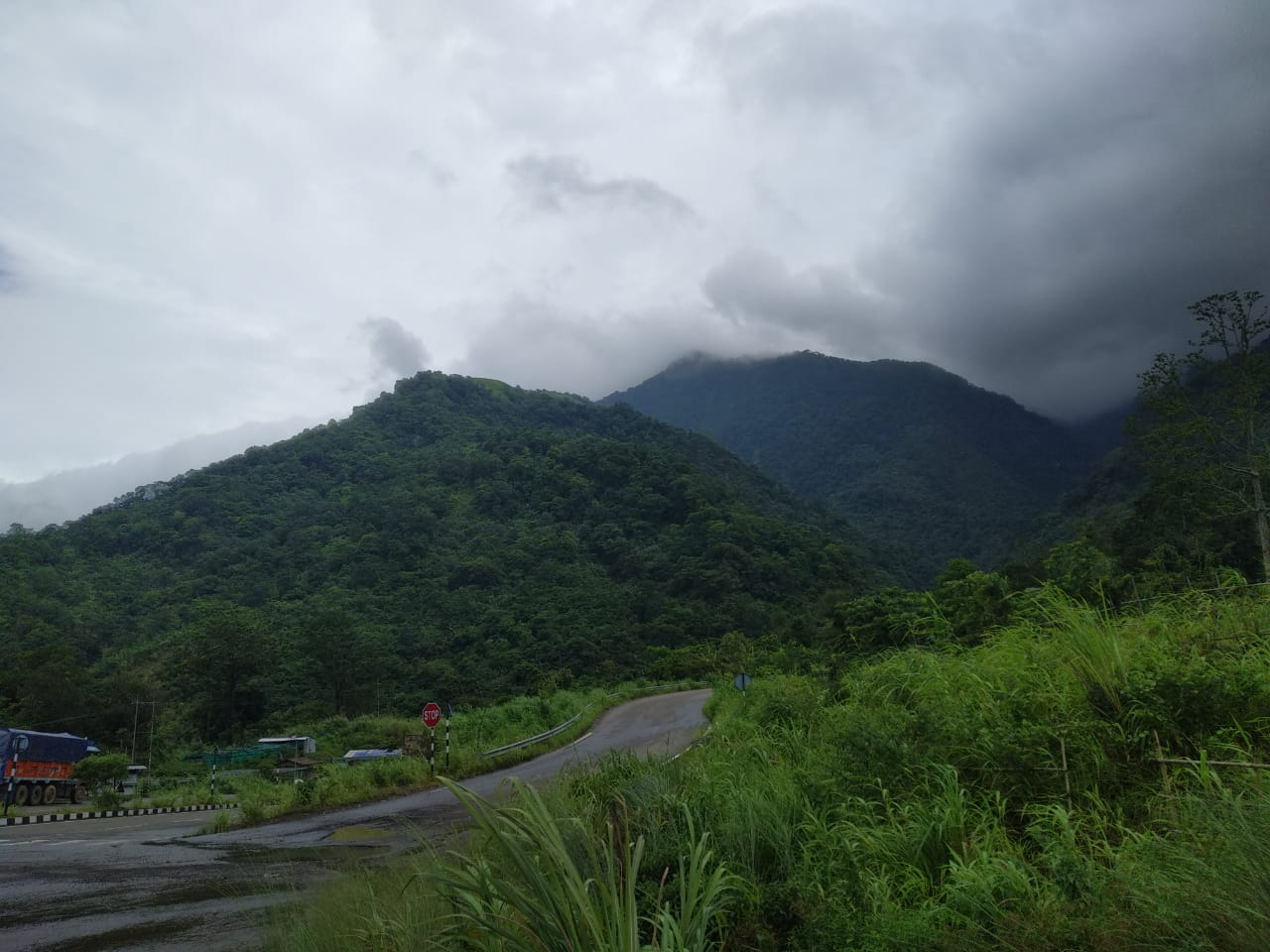
A forest of Barail range, Barak

There are around 104 forest Villages in Barak Valley. Among the three districts in Barak Valley, Cachar have an area of 3,786 km^{2}, out of which 2,222.34 km^{2} area is covered with forest, Hailakandi district have a total area of 1,327 km^{2}, out of which 774.34 km^{2} is covered with forest, Karimganj district have a total area of 1,809 km^{2}, out of which 851.43 km^{2} area is covered with forest.

== List of districts in Barak Valley ==
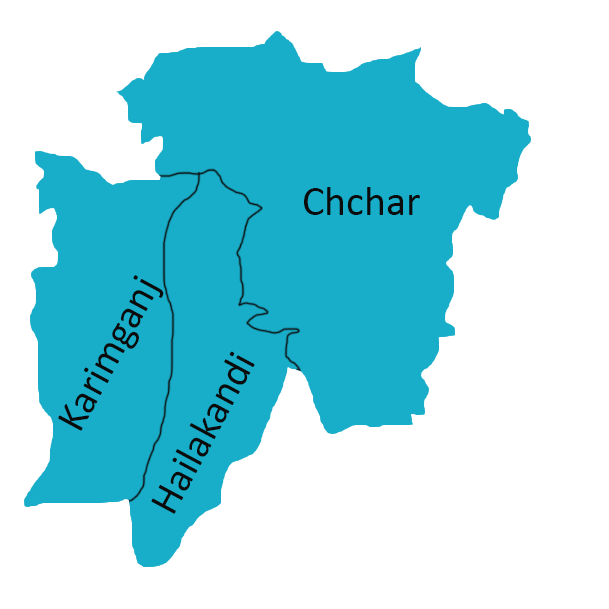
Barak Valley district map

There are three districts in the Barak Valley.

1. Karimganj having an area of 1,809 km^{2} and is the second largest district of the valley.
2. Hailakandi having an area of 1,327 km^{2} is third largest district of the valley.
3. Cachar having an area of 3,786 km^{2}. It is the largest district of the valley.

The total area of the valley is 6,922 km^{2}.

Historically, North Cachar Hills was once a part of Undivided Barak Valley. If that district is included, then the total area of Barak region as a whole increases up to 11,812 km^{2}, which is way bigger than the neighbouring Tripura state which have a total area of 10,491 km^{2}.

== Wildlife ==
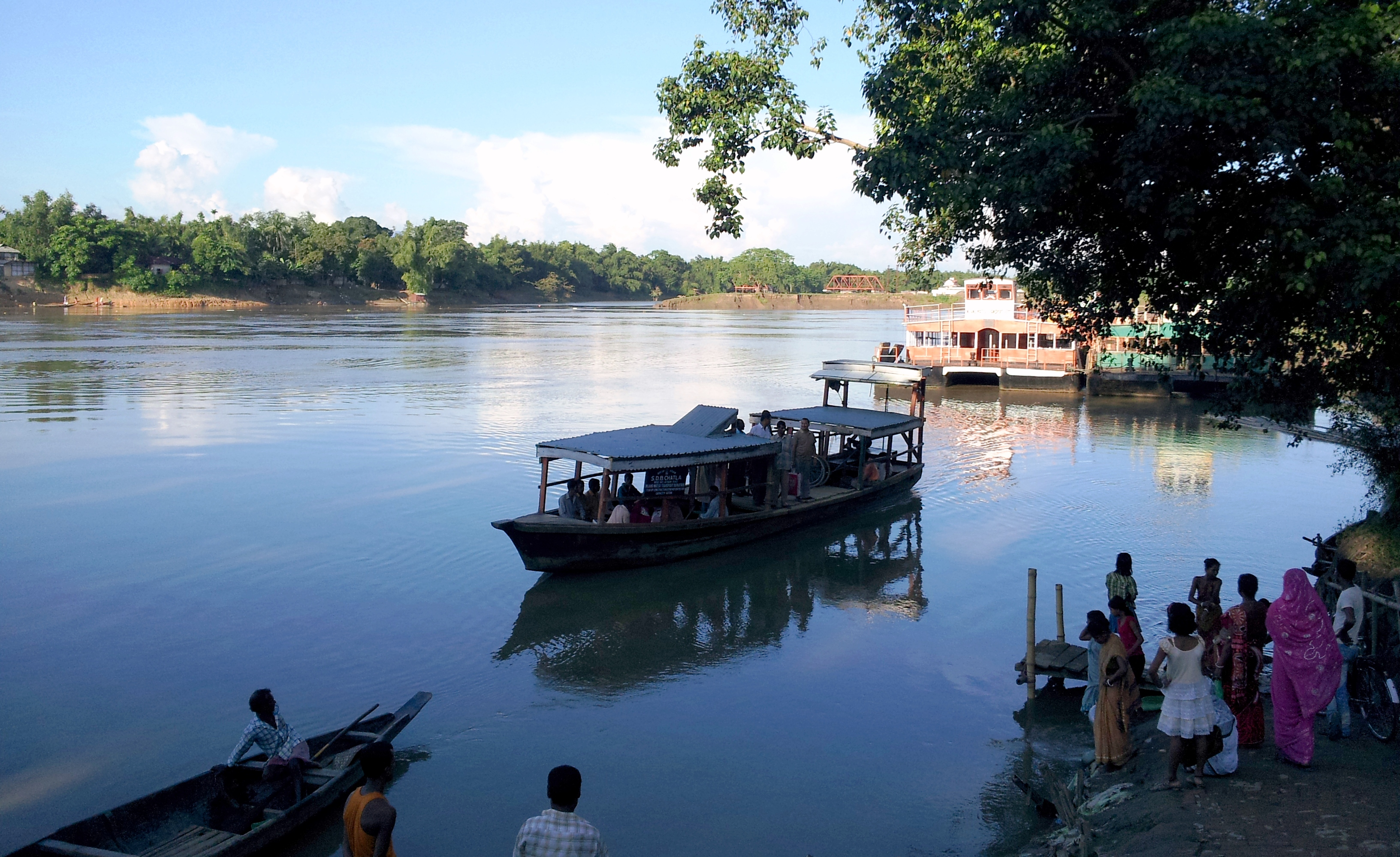
Barak River, a natural scenaric beauty of valley

The Asian elephant has already vanished from most of the valley. Barail is the only wildlife sanctuary of the Barak Valley region. It was initiated by noted naturalist Dr Anwaruddin Choudhury, who originally hailed from this region in the early 1980s. This sanctuary was ultimately notified in 2004. There are thirteen reserve forests in the valley comprising six in Karimganj, five in Cachar, and two are in Hailakandi. The Patharia hills reserve forest of Karimganj is the habitat of many mammals and was recommended to upgrade as 'Patharia hills wildlife sanctuary'. The southern part was also recommended as 'Dhaleswari' wildlife sanctuary.

== Weather ==
Barak Valley has a temperature that varies 35° to 40 °C and also has a humid environment with rainfall varying from 100 to 200 cm. It is one of the hottest and humid region of entire North East.

== Politics ==
Bengali-dominated Barak Valley have 15 Assembly seats. As per as vote share, maximum of the people in the valley have supported BJP in 2021 Assam Legislative Assembly election followed by INC and AIUDF. It has been found that 48.7% vote share have gone in the favour of BJP, 27% to Indian National Congress and 21.9% to AIUDF in the last election. As per as seat share concerned, BJP have won 53.3% seats, 26.7% AIUDF and 20% Indian National Congress, respectively. The Election Commission of India on 20 June 2023 have reduced the number of seats share of Barak Valley in Assam Legislative Assembly from 15 to just 13 assembly constituencies.

== Constituencies ==
Barak Valley has two Lok Sabha seats.

- Karimganj (Lok Sabha constituency)
- Silchar (Lok Sabha constituency)

Barak Valley has fifteen Assam Legislative Assembly seats.

- Hailakandi
- Algapur-Katlicherra
- Karimganj South
- Karimganj North
- Ratabari
- Patharkandi
- Katigorah
- Dholai
- Udharbond
- Sonai
- Silchar
- Barkhola
- Lakhipur

== Districts tehsils ==
District	Tehsil
Cachar district	1. Katigorah; 2. Lakhipur; 3. Silchar; 4. Sonai; 5. Udharbond
Hailakandi district	1. Algapur; 2. Hailakandi; 3. Katlicherra; 4. Lala
Karimganj district	1. Badarpur; 2. Karimganj; 3. Nilambazar; 4. Patharkandi; 5. Ramkrishna Nagar

== Notable people ==
- Karnendu Bhattacharjee — former MP of Rajya Sabha, Indian National Congress
- B. B. Bhattacharya — former vice-chancellor, Jawaharlal Nehru University, New Delhi
- Kalika Prasad Bhattacharya, singer
- Radheshyam Biswas, former member of Lok Sabha, AIUDF
- Abdul Jalil Choudhury — deobandi Islamic scholar, teacher & politician . Elected member of the Assam Legislative Assembly for 27 years in total
- Anwaruddin Choudhury — first Divisional Commissioner of Barak Valley when it was created as a separate division in 2015–16
- Moinul Hoque Choudhury — minister of Commerce and Industrial Development during Indira Gandhi regime in 1971;
- Sahidul Alam Choudhury - former cabinet minister in the Government of Assam and 5-time MLA from Algapur constituency
- Pritam Das — cricketer
- Aminul Haque Laskar — former deputy Speaker of the Assam Legislative Assembly, Bharatiya Janata Party
- Santosh Mohan Dev — former member of Lok Sabha, Indian National Congress, former Minister of Heavy Industry and Public Enterprises in the Union Cabinet
- Sushmita Dev — leader, All India Trinamool Congress
- Kripanath Mallah — member of Lok Sabha, Karimganj
- Abdul Matlib Mazumdar — freedom fighter, cabinet minister in last ministry during British period and then after independence, in the first and subsequent ministries; Assam's first Agriculture, Veterinary, & local self-government minister
- Gautam Roy — ex-minister, Assam
- Rajdeep Roy — former member of Lok Sabha, Silchar
- Debojit Saha — singer and television host

== Educational institutions ==
- Assam University
- Gurucharan University
- Barak Valley Engineering College (BVEC)
- Cachar College
- National Institute of Technology, Silchar

== See also ==
- Folk deities of Sylhet
- Sylhet Division
- Kachari Kingdom
- Brahmaputra Valley

== Sources ==
- Bhattacharjee, J B (1994), "Pre-colonial Political Structure of Barak Valley", in Sangma, Milton S (ed.), Essays on North-east India: Presented in Memory of Professor V. Venkata Rao, New Delhi: Indus Publishing Company, pp. 61–85
- Bhattacharya, Gargee (2018). "The Dimasa Kacharis of Cachar District: An Overview". Archived from the original on 30 November 2020.
- Cederlöf, Gunnel (2014). Founding an Empire on India's Northeast Frontiers 1790–1840: Climate, Commerce, Polity. New Delhi: Oxford University Press. ISBN 978-0-19-809057-1.
- Khan, Sameer Ud Dowla (21 February 2018). "Amago Bhasha: In celebration of our ethnic and linguistic diversity". Dhaka Tribune.
- Lochtefeld, James G (2002). The Illustrated Encyclopedia of Hinduism: A-M. The Rosen Publishing Group. ISBN 978-0-8239-3179-8.
- Ludden, David (2003). "The First Boundary of Bangladesh on Sylhet's Northern Frontiers". Journal of the Asiatic Society of Bangladesh. 48 (1): 1–54.
- Ludden, David (2003). "Political maps and cultural territories". Himal Magazine. Archived from the original on 30 May 2021.
- Mahanta, Sakuntala; Gope, Amalesh (2018). "Tonal polarity in Sylheti in the context of noun faithfulness". Language Sciences. 69: 80–97. doi:10.1016/j.langsci.2018.06.010. S2CID 149759441.
- Shin, Jae-Eun (2020). "Descending from demons, ascending to kshatriyas: Genealogical claims and political process in pre-modern Northeast India, The Chutiyas and the Dimasas". The Indian Economic and Social History Review. 57 (1): 49–75. doi:10.1177/0019464619894134. S2CID 213213265.
- Tunga, S. S. (1995). Bengali and Other Related Dialects of South Assam. Delhi: Mittal Publications. ISBN 9788170995883.
- Baruah, Binita (1999). Sibsagar dialect: A socio-linguistic study (PhD). Cotton college.
