= Undivided Cachar district =

The Undivided Cachar district is a former administrative district of Assam Province (now Assam) that is largely congruous to the Kachari kingdom of Govinda Chandra, the last king of the kingdom before its division and annexation by the British Raj. It has been divided into the present-day districts of Cachar, Dima Hasao (formerly "North Cachar Hills") and Hailakandi. Dima Hasao is an autonomous hill district of present-day Assam. The Cachar and Hailakhandi districts are a part of the Barak Valley region in Assam. Karimganj is a part of Sylhet, which was allocated to East Pakistan (present-day Bangladesh) during the Partition of India.

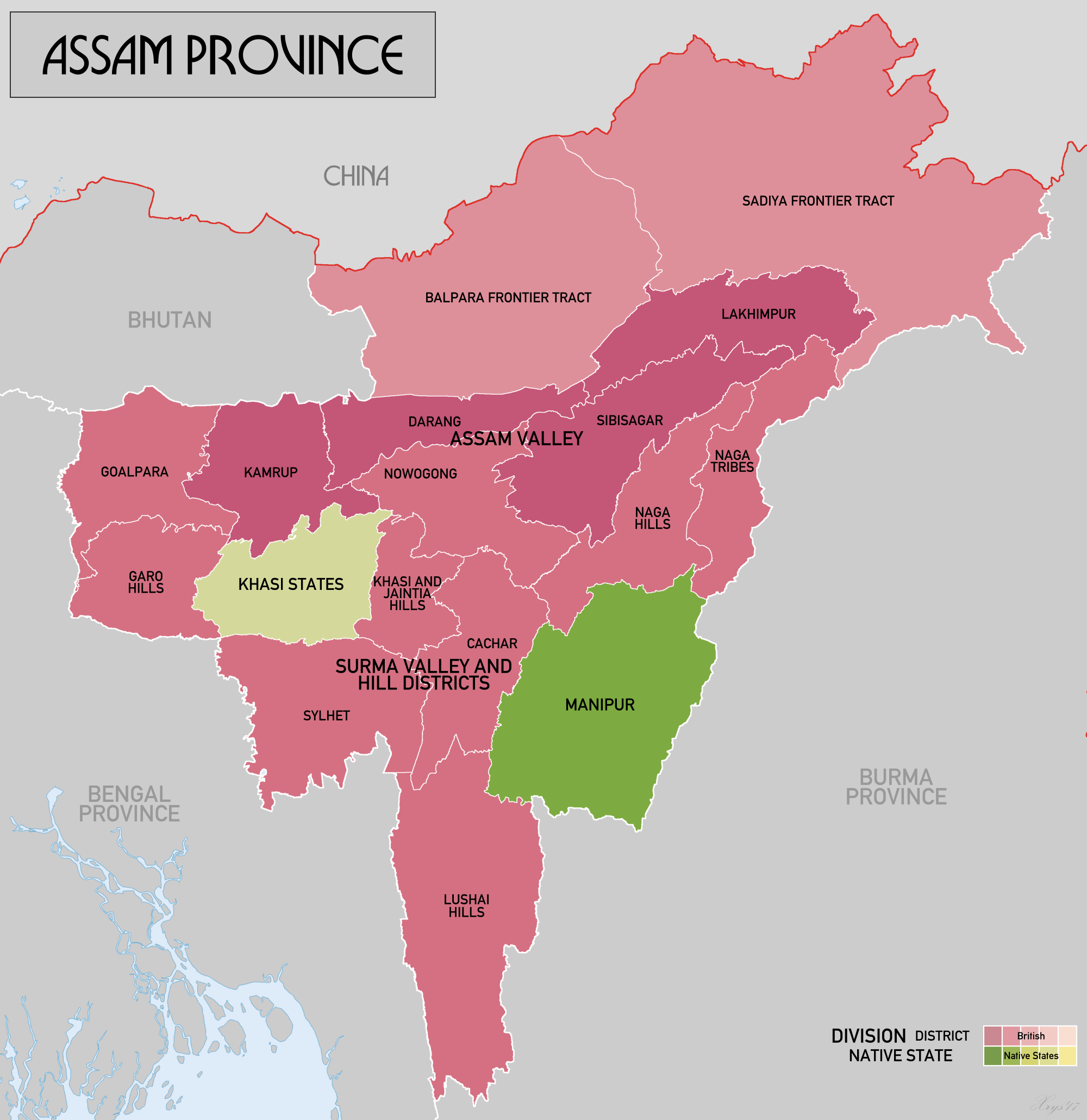
Undivided Cachardistrict in colonial Assam, 1936

Cachar district in 1950
