= Nongtyngur =

Village in Meghalaya, India

Nongtyngur is a village in the East Khasi Hills District of the Indian state of Meghalaya. Nongtyngur village is 30 kilometers from Pynursla. There are views over the plain of Bangladesh. Nearby villages are Lyngkhat, Rimassar, Nongkyndah, Mawlynnong, and Nohwet.
