= Rongpur II =

Village in Assam, India

Rongpur Rongpur
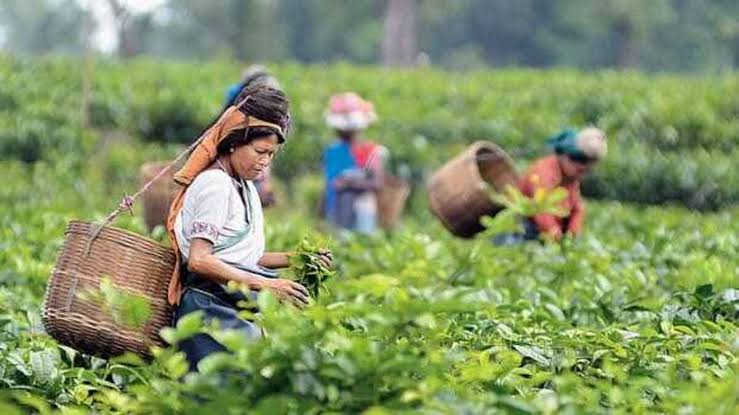
- Nickname: Rongpur
- Location in Assam, India Rongpur (India)
- Country: India
- State: Assam
- District: Hailakandi

Area
  - Total: 3.17 km^{2} (1.22 sq mi)
  - Density: 1,127/km^{2} (2,920/sq mi)
- Demonym: Bengali

Languages
  - Official: Bengali and Meitei (Manipuri)
- Time zone: UTC+5:30 (IST)
- ISO 3166 code: IN-AS
- Vehicle registration: AS-24

Rongpur (known as Rongpur ll) is a village in Katlicherra subdivision of Hailakandi district, Assam India. It is located 25 km south of Hailakandi town and 3 km from Katlicherra..The village falls in Hailakandi district with a population 2068. The male and female populations are 1093 and 975 as of census 2011. The size of the area is about 3.17 square kilometre.

== Demography ==
Bengali and Meitei (Manipuri) are the official languages of this place.

=== Population census ===
Rongpur village has a population of 293 children aged 0–6, making up 16.38% of the total. The average sex ratio is 891, lower than the Assam state average of 958. Rongpur has a high literacy rate, with male literacy at 92.18% and female at 79.57% as of 2011 census.

== Gallery ==
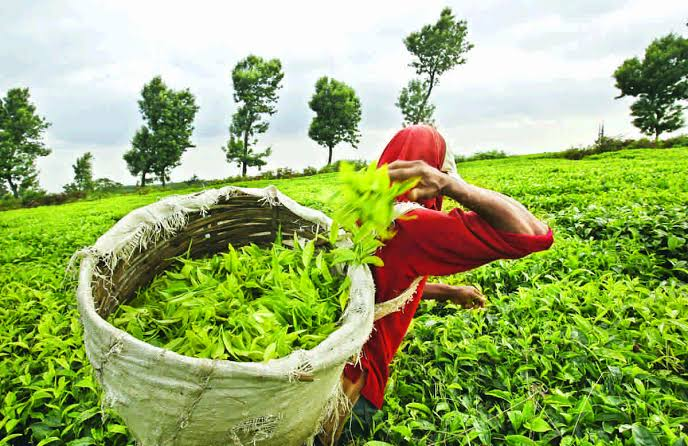
Tea Garden
