= Hailakandi district =

Coordinates: 24.6833°N 92.5667°E

- District of Assam
- Hailakandi
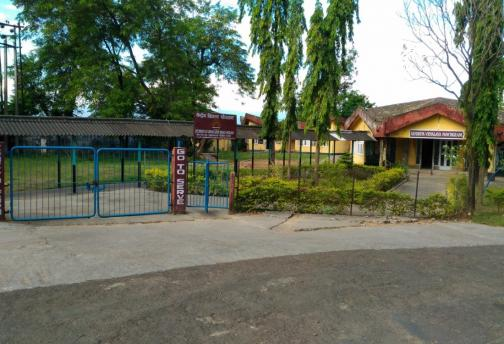
- Kendriya Vidyalaya, Panchgram

- Location in Assam
- Country: India
- State: Assam
- Division: Barak Valley
- District created: 1 October 1989
- Headquarters: Hailakandi

Government
  - Lok Sabha constituencies: Karimganj (shared with Karimganj district)
  - Vidhan Sabha constituencies: Hailakandi, Katlicherra, Algapur

Area
  - Total: 1,327 km^{2} (512 sq mi)
- Elevation: 21 m (69 ft)

Population (2011)
  - Total: 659,296
  - Density: 497/km^{2} (1,290/sq mi)
- Demonym(s): Hailakandian, Hailakandiya
- Time zone: UTC+5:30 (IST)
- PIN: 78815X
- Telephone code: 91 – (0) 3844
- ISO 3166 code: IN-AS
- Vehicle registration: AS-24
- Official language: Bengali
- Associate official language: Meitei (Manipuri)
- Website: hailakandi.assam.gov.in

Hailakandi district is one of the 35 districts of Assam state in northeastern India. It makes up the Barak Valley alongside Cachar and Karimganj. It was constituted as a civil subdivision on 1 June 1869. Subsequently, it was upgraded to a district in 1989, when it was split from Cachar district. The district headquarters is Hailakandi.

== History ==
Archaeological Survey Of India mentions that in Bhatera Copper Plate which dates back to 1049 A.D, & was issued by Govinda-Keasavadeva ruler of Srihatta-Rajya has mentioned of Katakhal which now falls in Hailakandi. The plate also tells us about a local Bengali dialect being used to write the inscriptions along with Sanskrit, specifically the lines from 29 to 51.

It was constituted as a civil subdivision on 1 June 1869. Subsequently, it was upgraded to a district in 1989. The later history of Hailakandi is intricately linked to Abdul Matlib Mazumdar (1890–1980), Late Nagendranath Choudhury, Late (Capt.) Manmatha Choudhury, Late (Capt.) Subodh Kumar Dutta and Late Sunil Chakravorty who lead the freedom movement in the erstwhile Sub-division. Nagendranath Choudhury was a prominent Congress-leader; Pandit Jawaharlal Nehru called on him in his house during his visit to Hailakandi in 1939. His brother Manmatha Choudhury was a captain in the Azad Hind Fauj formed by Subhash Chandra Bose. In 1946, when India was still under British rule, Mr. Abdul Matlib Majumder became an MLA and also Cabinet Minister of Assam. He was one of the prominent Muslim leaders of eastern India to support Hindu-Muslim unity, opposing the partition of India on communal lines. Mazumdar along with Fakhruddin Ali Ahmed (who later became the 5th President of India) became the most prominent Muslim opponents of the demand for a separate Muslim state of Pakistan, especially in the eastern part of the country. Mazumdar took Master of Arts Degree in English literature from Dhaka University in 1921 and B.L. from Calcutta in 1924. He started legal practice at Hailakandi Bar in 1925. He rose to prominence as a lawyer serving the people of Hailakandi. The then government offered him the post of a Magistrate, which he refused. He joined the Indian National Congress in 1925. He founded the Hailakandi Congress Committee in 1937 and became its first President. Netaji Subhash Chandra Bose and Pandit Jawaharlal Nehru visited Hailakandi in 1939 and 1945 respectively at the invitation of Mazumdar to strengthen the freedom movement as well as the Congress party in southern Assam. It was Netaji who initiated establishment of contact between Maulana Abul Kalam Azad and Matlib Mazumdar for gearing up nationalist Muslims against a growing Muslim League in the region. Mazumdar became the first Chairman of Hailakandi township in 1939 and in 1945 he became the first Indian Chairman of the Hailakandi Local Board, a post always held by the European tea planters.

The Muslim League proved its might in the Muslim-dominated areas of India in 1937 elections. To counter the rising popularity of Muslim League, he successfully organised the Jamiat Ulema-e-Hind movement in Assam. Jamiat was an ally of the Congress having a mass following among the Indian nationalist Muslims. In the very crucial 1946 General Elections just on the eve of India's independence, he wrested the Muslim majority Hailakandi seat from the hold of Muslim League. That victory virtually sealed the hopes and aspirations of the Muslim League to include southern Assam in Pakistan. It may be mentioned here that in that election, the bulk of the Muslim nominees of the Indian National Congress including Fakhruddin Ali Ahmed (5th President of India in later years) had lost to their Muslim League rivals miserably.

Assam's Surma Valley (now partly in Bangladesh) had Muslim-majority population. On the eve of partition, hectic activities intensified by the Muslim League as well Congress with the former having an edge. A referendum had been proposed for Sylhet District (now in Bangladesh). Mazumdar along with Basanta Kumar Das (then Home Minister of Assam) travelled throughout the valley organising the Congress and addressing meetings educating the masses about the outcome of partition on the basis of religion. On 20 February 1947, Moulvi Mazumdar inaugurated a convention – Assam Nationalist Muslim's Convention at Silchar. There after another big meeting was held at Silchar on 8 June 1947. Both the meetings, which were attended by a large section of Muslims paid dividend. He was also among the few who were instrumental in retaining the Barak Valley region of Assam with India. Mazumdar was the leader of the delegation that pleaded before the Radcliffe Commission that ensured that a part of Sylhet (now in Bangladesh) remains with India despite being Muslim-majority (present Karimganj district).

Moulvi Mazumdar joined as a Cabinet Minister of Assam in 1946 with the portfolios of Local Self-Government, Agriculture and Veterinary. In 1947, India became free from British rule, when Mazumdar again took charge of the same departments in Gopinath Bordoloi's cabinet as the only Muslim minister (Moulana Tayyebulla was inducted in 1948) and also the lone member from the entire Barak valley region. The entire eastern India was swept by violence just after India's partition and independence on 15 August 1947, scores of Hindus fled the newly created East Pakistan (now Bangladesh) for India, and Muslims fled Assam for East Pakistan. A large number of people lost their lives owing to violence, which resurfaced with more ferocity in 1950. Mazumdar, the only Muslim in the cabinet, along with his cabinet and party colleagues took up responsibility for the safety of both Hindus and Muslims in Hailakandi, touring affected areas and arranging camps and rehabilitation for the refugees, organising supplies and security.

He continued as a Cabinet Minister in Bishnuram Medhi's cabinet till 1957. His last election was in 1967 when at the age of 77, Mazumdar reached Assam Assembly victorious. He then became the Minister for Law, Social Welfare and Political Sufferers in Bimala Prasad Chaliha's cabinet. As Law minister, he initiated the separation of executive and judiciary at the district level. During the Bangladesh's war of liberation in 1970–71, he was in charge of relief-&-rehabilitation of the thousands of refugees who fled the then East Pakistan. He resigned from active politics in 1971. Other posts held by him during his long career are the Chairman, Assam Madrassa Board; Chairman, State Haj Committee and the Pro tem Speaker of the Assam Legislative Assembly (in 1967). He was instrumental in setting up the hajj house [haji musafir khana] at Guwahati. As Chairman of Madrassah Board, he initiated modernisation of these theological schools and is also credited for the introduction of English and science in the curriculum of madrassas of Assam. He was the key person to set up centres of higher education at Hailakandi.

Another prominent person from Hailakandi was Late Raj Mohan Nath, a noted Engineer, whose authored many books on different subjects apart from engineering. One of his books was a text-book for the students of civil engineering in the Bengal Engineering College, Shibpur (West Bengal). Today's "Assam-type house" is entirely his concept which gained vast popularity in the earthquake zones. One of the roads in Moscow has been named after him

Hailakandi Airfield is a former wartime United States Army Air Forces airfield in India, used during the Burma Campaign 1944-1945. It is now abandoned. Hailakandi is a district of the Indian state of Assam.

== Geography ==
Hailakandi district occupies an area of 1,327 square kilometres (512 sq mi), comparatively equivalent to Qeshm Island of Iran. Out of this, more than 50% is reserve forest. There are total of two reserve forests in Hailakandi district viz. Inner line reserve forest and Katakhal reserve forest. The district has got inter-state border with Mizoram on its south having a length of 76 km besides inter district border on other sides with Karimganj district and Cachar district. As per 2001 census, it has a population of 542978. It comprises two notified towns viz. Hailakandi (district headquarters) and Lala and one industrial town ship viz. Panchgram a Municipal Board governs Hailakandi town & a town Committee governs Lala. It has five development blocks viz. Algapur, Hailakandi, Lala, Katlicherra & South Hailakandi development Block. There is a Mahkuma Parishad named Hailakandi Mahkuma Parishad covering these 5 Development Blocks. There are total of 62 Nos. of Gaon Panchayat under these five blocks. The district is divided into four revenue circles comprising a total of 393 villages (including 27 forest villages). Nearly half the district consists of forests. Out of the remaining half, 33.2% is under cultivation. Rice is the main crop. District has got 17 tea gardens. The District has 4 Police stations, 2 Police out post, 2 Colleges, 43 H/E, H/School, 247 ME/ MV Schools and 937 LP schools.

The forests of Hailakandi district were once rich in wildlife but now vanishing due to human onslaught. rare species found are Hoolock gibbon, Phayre's leaf monkey, Pig-tailed macaque, White-winged Wood Duck, Purple Wood Pigeon, etc., have been recorded. The southern part was also recommended as 'Dhaleswari' wildlife sanctuary.

== Economy ==
In 2006, the Indian government named Hailakandi as one of the country's 250 most backward districts (out of a total of 640). It is one of the eleven districts in Assam currently receiving funds from the Backward Regions Grant Fund Programme (BRGF).

== Demographics ==
Historical population
Year	Pop.	±% p.a.
1901	112,897	—
1911	131,060	+1.50%
1921	141,012	+0.73%
1931	150,992	+0.69%
1941	166,536	+0.98%
1951	195,650	+1.62%
1961	248,927	+2.44%
1971	307,695	+2.14%
1991	449,048	+1.91%
2001	542,872	+1.92%
2011	659,296	+1.96%

Religion in Hailakandi district (2011)
Religion	Percent
Islam	60.31%
Hinduism	38.10%
Christianity	1.29%
Other or not stated	0.30%

Population of circles by religion
Circle	Muslims (%)	Hindus (%)	Christians (%)	Others (%)
Algapur	67.66	31.72	0.28	0.34
Hailakandi	71.08	28.28	0.44	0.2
Katlichara	50.00	47.01	2.58	0.41
Lala	55.61	42.61	1.51	0.27

According to the 2011 census, Hailakandi district has a population of 659,296, roughly equal to the nation of Montenegro or the US state of North Dakota. Population in the age group of 0–6 years was 111,278. The district has a population density of 497 inhabitants per square kilometre (1,290/sq mi). Hailakandi has a sex ratio of 946 females for every 1000 males. 7.30% of the population lives in urban areas. The Scheduled Castes and Scheduled Tribes had a population of 70,659 (10.72%) and 691 (0.10%) respectively. There were 407,366 literates as of 2011, giving it a Crude literacy rate of 61.8% and an Effective literacy (7+ population) of 74.3%. There were 143350 households as of 2011.

Languages in Hailakandi district (2011)
1. Bengali (84.6%)
2. Hindi (7.74%)
3. Kokborok (2.11%)
4. Manipuri (1.92%)
5. Bhojpuri (1.65%)
6. Others (1.94%)

Bengali and Meitei (Manipuri) are the official languages of this place. Although Bengali is the official language, the most common spoken language is Sylheti, which is often grouped with Bengali as a dialect. As per the 2011 census, the majority of the population speaks Bengali (84.64%), followed by Hindi (7.74%), Kokborok (2.11%), Meitei (1.92%), Dimasa (1.81%) and Bhojpuri (1.65%).

Sylhetis form the majority of the district population, but the district is also home to a large number of different communities. There are Dimasa, Reang Kachari, Meitei, Bishnupriya, Kuki, Hrangkhol, Chakma and immigrant populations from erstwhile East Pakistan.

== Governance and politics ==
=== Divisions ===
There are three Assam Legislative Assembly constituencies in this district: Hailakandi, Katlicherra, and Algapur. The whole district comes under the Karimganj Lok Sabha constituency.

=== Villages ===
- Lawat, amala
- Rongpur II

== Notable people ==
- Anwaruddin Choudhury, first Divisional Commissioner of Barak Valley when it was separated from Hilll Areas in 2015-16
- Sahidul Alam Choudhury, Former cabinet minister of panchayet & rural development, department of municipal administration during AGP led government of Assam
- Abdul Matlib Mazumdar, freedom fighter, cabinet minister in last ministry during British period and then after independence, in the first and subsequent ministries
- Abdul Muhib Mazumder, former cabinet minister of the Indian National Congress and Asom Gana Parishad coalition ministries. Former Advocate General of Assam and Arunachal Pradesh. Senior advocate of Gauhati High Court. Member of AICC
- Gautam Roy, former cabinet minister of the last Indian National Congress ministry. President of the District Sports Association, Hailakandi, former Vice President of BCCI, former President of Assam Cricket Association
