= Algapur =

- Town
- Location in Assam, India Algapur (India)
- Coordinates: 24.867°N 92.687°E
- Country: India
- State: Assam
- District: Hailakandi
- Elevation: 25 m (82 ft)

Population (2011)
  - Total: 2,732

Languages
  - Official: Bengali and Meitei (Manipuri)
- Time zone: UTC+5:30 (IST)
- Vehicle registration: AS

Algapur (Pron:/ˈalɡəˈpʊə/) is a town and Tehsil or Block in Hailakandi district in the state of Assam, India. It is located 8 km from District headquarters Hailakandi.

Bengali and Meitei (Manipuri) are the official languages of this place.

== Geography ==
Algapur is located at 24.87°N 92.69°E. It has an average elevation of 25 metres (82 feet).

== Politics ==
Algapur is part of Karimganj (Lok Sabha constituency).
