= Kalain =

Kalain (The Gateway of Barak Valley)
- Town
- Location within Assam Location within India
- Coordinates: 24.968°N 92.572°E
- Country: India
- State: Katigorah Assam
- District: Cachar

Languages
  - Official: Bengali and Meitei (Manipuri)
- Time zone: UTC+5:30 (IST)
- Postal code: 788815
- Vehicle registration: AS 11

Kalain is situated in a strategic location of the Cachar district of Assam, India. It is about 28.5 kilometres (17.7 mi) from the district headquarters, Silchar, and is called the Gateway to Barak Valley. There are three railway stations that connect Kalain smoothly to rest of the valley and the state of Assam; one at Hilara, one at Sukritipur. and one at Bihara

Moreover, Kalain is 300 kilometres (190 mi) east of Guwahati and 190 kilometres from Shillong, 187 kilometres from Mawlynnong- the village that featured as the cleanest village in Asia. It is the main town in the Katigorah (Vidhan Sabha constituency) in Assam.

== Overview ==
Kalain, similar to its neighbours, is also incredibly diverse and multicultural. There are many NGOs working at the town, who help improve the relatively low-income population. The roads that pass through Kalain to other places, also pass through the green meadows and the tea estates surrounding Kalain.

== Culture ==
Bengali and Meitei (Manipuri) are the official languages of this place.

Sylheti is the prominent language of the town. Bengali comes next to it in terms of the use of a mostly spoken language. The other groups of languages that are spoken by several ethnolinguistic groups in and around the town are Assamese, Bishnupriya Manipuri, English, Khasi, Kachari, Kuki, Chakma, Hindi, Meiteilon, Nepali, Baganiya, Saora etc. The main reason behind this linguistic diversity in the culture of the town is because of the migration of people from various parts of the state and the nation related to work and profession that the town sees. The town has a good equilibrium in religious plane, where the Muslims and the Hindus share the major part. However, the most beautiful part of this composition is that in the festivals of both these major religions, the adherents from all spheres participate, celebrate, and complement amongst themselves. The current state of education infrastructure in and around the town can be termed as somewhat in the way of a bloom. There are many educational institutes that are on a rise. Many religious places add beauty to the lifestyle and lifeline of the people out in the town and its vicinity. In one side of the national highway that passes through the heart of the town, you can see a Kalibari and a temple, and in another side of the same national highway you can find a Mosque and an Eidgah adding to the beauty of the town.
