= Netaji Subhas Chandra Bose Stadium =

Multi-purpose stadium in Hailakandi, Assam, India

- Full name: Netaji Subhas Chandra Bose Stadium
- Location: Hailakandi, Assam
- Capacity: 5,000

Construction
- Groundbreaking: 2005
- Opened: 2005 (first cricket match recorded)

Website
- ESPNcricinfo

Netaji Subhas Chandra Bose Stadium is a multi-purpose stadium in Hailakandi, Assam, India. The stadium is mainly used for football and cricket matches.

It is named after the Indian freedom fighter Netaji Subhas Chandra Bose. The stadium is mainly used for football, but earlier hosted three cricket matches.
