= Mawlynnong =

- village
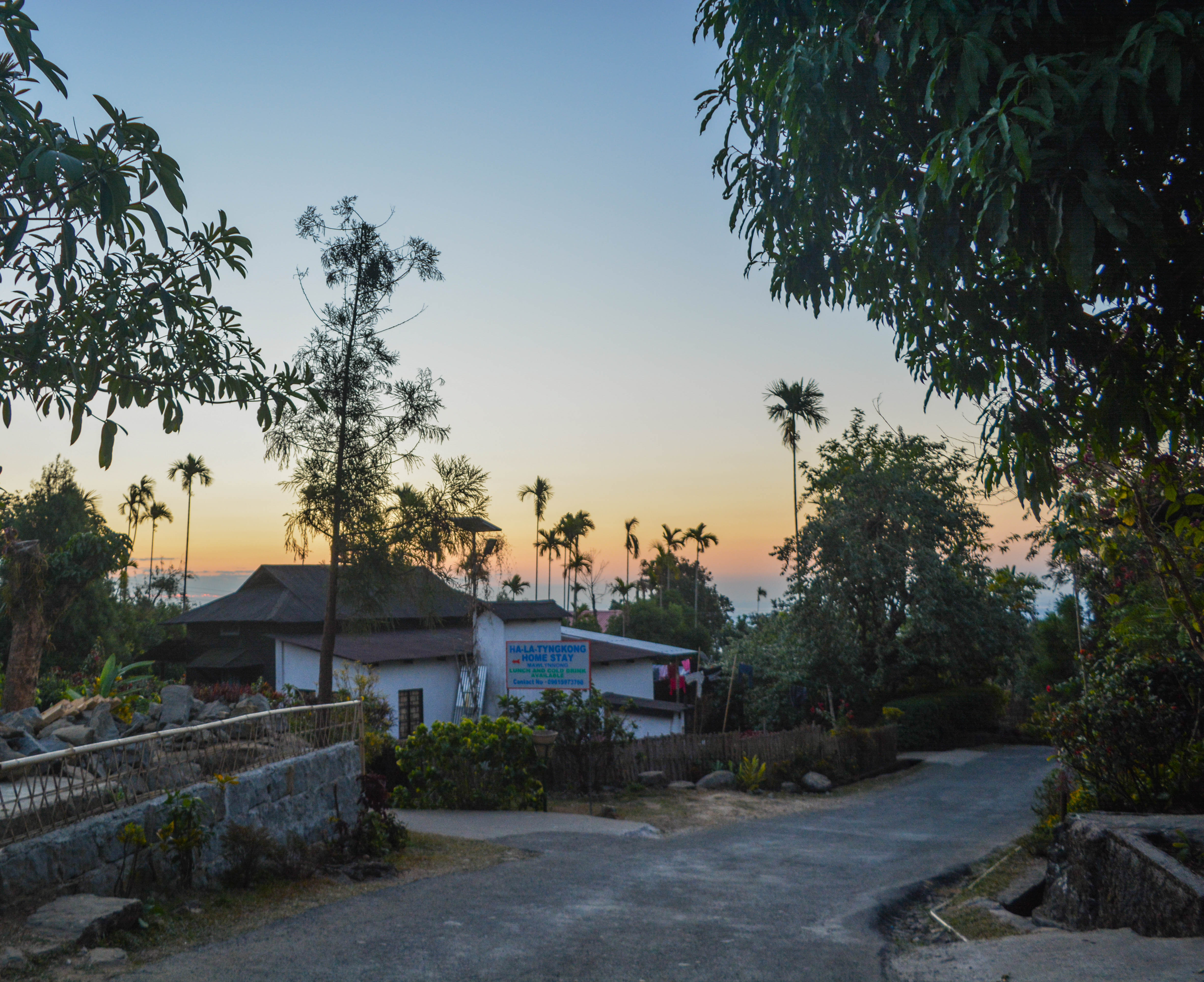
- Mawlynnong in 2017
- Interactive map of Mawlynnong
- Country: India
- State: Meghalaya
- District: East Khasi Hills
- Block: Pynursla

Population (2019)
  - Total: 900
- Time zone: UTC+5:30 (IST)
- Climate: Cwa

Mawlynnong is a village in the East Khasi Hills district of the Meghalaya state in North East India. It is notable for its cleanliness and also was chosen by Discover India magazine as Asia's cleanest village.

The village comes under the Pynursla community development block and Vidhan Sabha (legislative assembly) constituency.

== Geography ==
Mawlynnong is located 90 km from Shillong; along the India–Bangladesh border. Kalain "The Gateway Of Barak Valley" is 187 km from Mawlynnong.

== Demographics ==
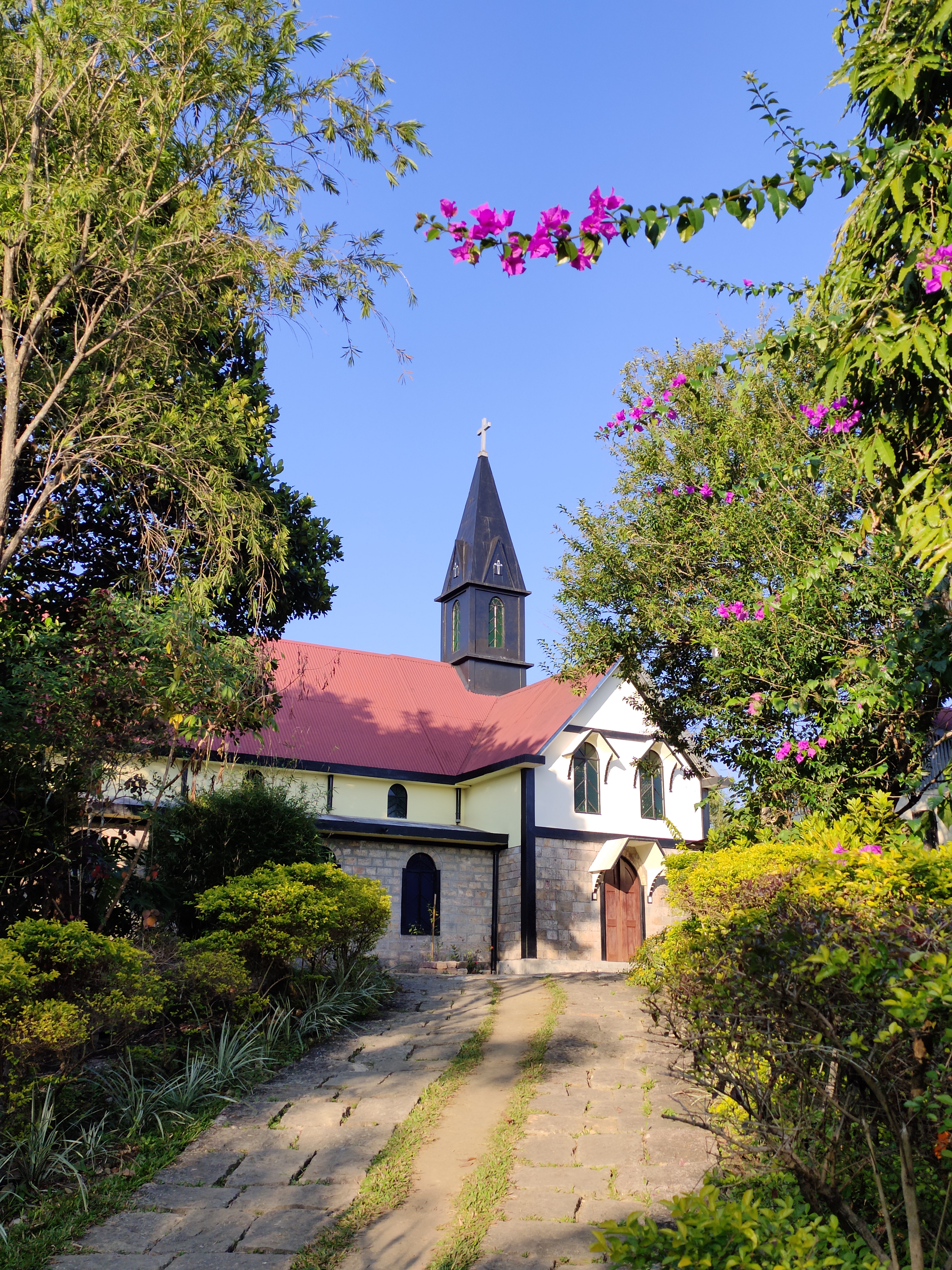
Church of the Epiphany, Mawlynnong

In 2026, its population numbers 600 residents, whereas in 2019, Mawlynnong had 900 residents. As of 2014, there were about 95 households in Mawlynnong. The literacy rate is 90%. Agriculture is the chief occupation of the local population, with betel nut being the main crop. During summers, one can find pineapples and lychees which are then exported to the nearby regions as well.

The people residing in the community are Khasi people. The population mostly follow Christianity, and the village has three churches.

== Matrilineal society ==
As is the tradition of the Khasi people, Mawlynnong property and wealth are passed from the mother to the youngest of her daughters, who also keeps the mother's surname.

== Sanitation ==
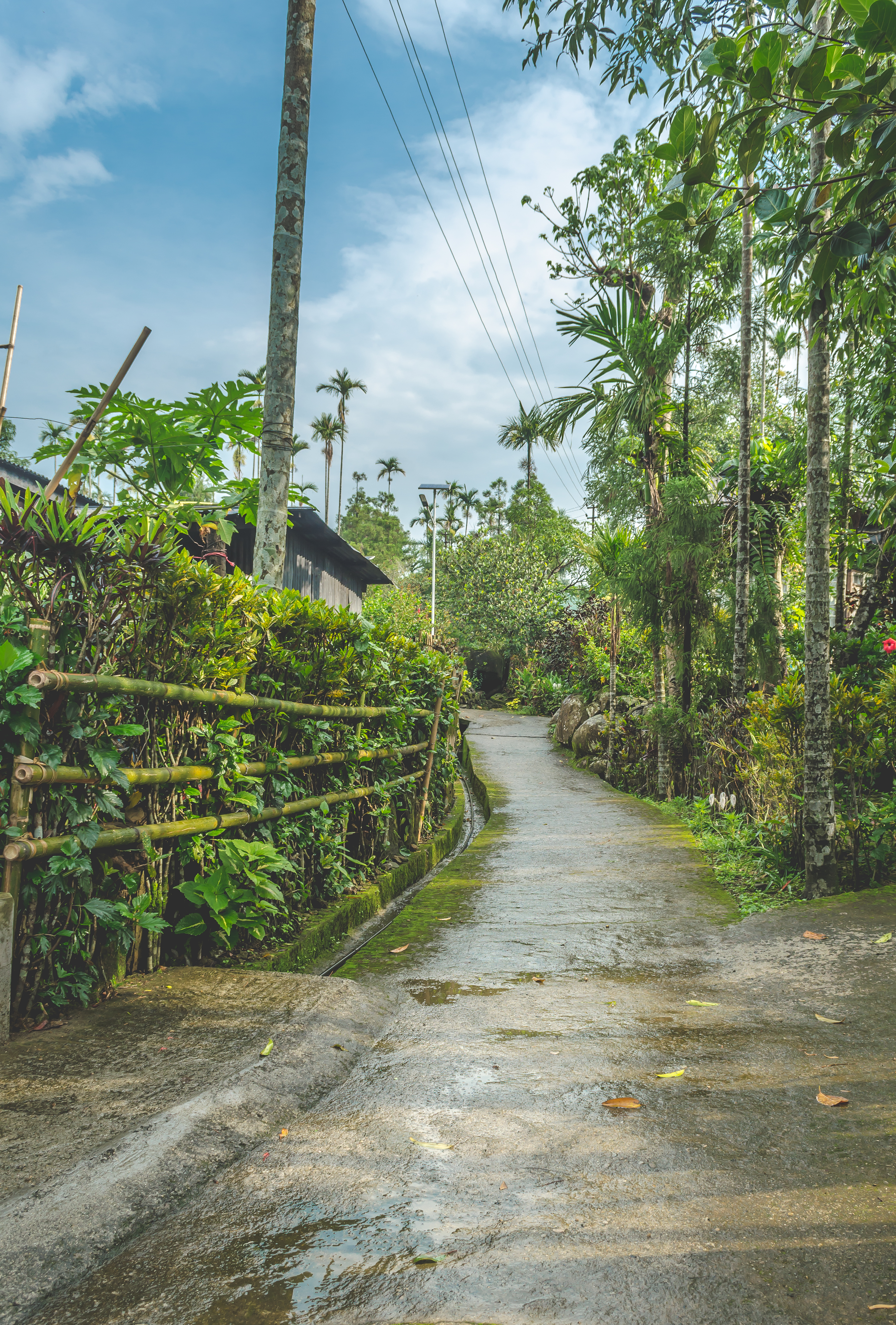
A road in Mawlynnong

Mawlynnong is known for its cleanliness. The waste is collected in the dustbins made of bamboo, directed to a pit and then used as manure. A community initiative mandates that all residents should participate in cleaning up the village. Smoking and use of polythene is banned while rainwater harvesting is encouraged.

The travel magazine Discover India declared the village as Asia's cleanest village in 2003, and the cleanest in India in 2005. This reputation has boosted local tourism; in 2017 NPR reported that, according to the village headsman, incomes had increased by 60 percent due to increased tourism.
