= Lawat, amala =

Lawat, Amala is a village in Hailakandi district of Assam state of India. The official languages of the village are Bengali and Meitei.
