= Lala, Assam =

Lala
- Town
- Location in Assam, India Lala (India)
- Coordinates: 24.55°N 92.6°E
- Country: India
- State: Assam
- District: Hailakandi

Government
  - Type: Elected
  - Body: Lala Municipal Board
- Elevation: 21 m (69 ft)

Population (2011)
  - Total: 11,771

Languages
  - Official: Bengali and Meitei (Manipuri)
- Time zone: UTC+5:30 (IST)
- ISO 3166 code: IN-AS
- Vehicle registration: AS 24

Lala is a town and a town area committee in Hailakandi district in the Indian state of Assam.

== Geography ==
Lala is located at 24.55°N 92.6°E. It has an average elevation of 21 metres (69 feet).

== Demographics ==
Bengali and Meitei (Manipuri) are the official languages of this place.

As of 2001 India census, Lala had a population of 10,345. Males constitute 50% of the population and females 50%. Lala has an average literacy rate of 81%, higher than the national average of 59.5%: male literacy is 84%, and female literacy is 78%. In Lala, 11% of the population is under 6 years of age.
