= Hailakandi Airfield =

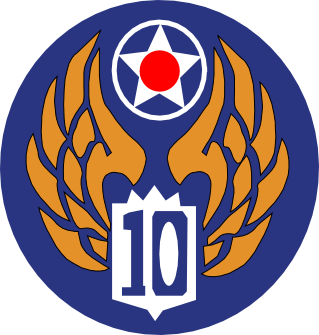
Hailakandi Airfield
- Part of Tenth Air Force
- Hailakandi, India

Site information
- Type: Military airfield
- Controlled by: United States Army Air Forces

Location
- Location within Assam Location within India
- Coordinates: 24°41′03″N 092°33′29″E (Approximate)

Site history
- Built: 1944
- In use: 1944–1945
- Battles/wars: Burma Campaign 1944–1945

Hailakandi Airfield is a former wartime United States Army Air Forces airfield in India, used during the Burma Campaign 1944–1945. It is now abandoned. Hailakandi is a district of the Indian state of Assam.

== History ==
The airfield was the home of the 1st Air Commando Group, being formed at the base in March 1944. The unit was a United States Army Air Forces group of fighters, bombers, transports, military gliders and small planes operating in the South-East Asian Theatre of World War II. They were part of the U.S. Tenth Air Force providing close air support for the British Fourteenth Army in the Burma Campaign.

The Air Commando Groups was born out of a simple need. That need was to support via light airplanes the evacuation and resupply requirements of British Long Range Patrol (LRP) groups, or Chindits, as they were affectionately called. Carrying the lethal firepower of both bombers and fighters combined with the logistical tentacles of a gamut of transports, gliders, and light aircraft, this organization would reach deep behind enemy lines to do battle.

Once formed, the unit moved Asansol Airfield on 20 May 1944 and the airfield was used for non-combat operations for the remainder of the war.
