= Hailakandi =

Hailakandi Town
- Town
- Hailakandi Municipal Board
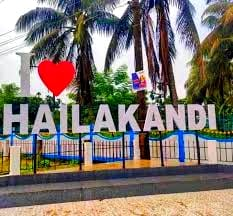
- Hailakandi Town

- Location in Assam, India Hailakandi Town (India)
- Coordinates: 24.68°N 92.57°E
- Country: India
- State: Assam
- District: Hailakandi
- District created: 1 October 1989

Government
  - Body: Hailakandi Municipality Board

Area
  - Total: 1,327 km^{2} (512 sq mi)
- Elevation: 21 m (69 ft)

Population
  - Total: 33,637(census of 2,011)
  - Density: 497/km^{2} (1,290/sq mi)

Languages
  - Official: Bengali and Meitei (Manipuri)
- Time zone: UTC+5:30 (IST)
- PIN: 788155
- Telephone code: 91 - (0) 03844
- Vehicle registration: AS-24
- Website: hailakandi.assam.gov.in

Hailakandi (Bengali pronunciation: [hai̯laːkandi]) is a town and the district headquarters of Hailakandi district in the Indian state of Assam. Hailakandi is located at 24.68°N 92.57°E.

== Demography ==
Bengali and Meitei (Manipuri) are the official languages of this place.

Religions in Hailakandi Town (2011)
1. Hinduism (67.3%)
2. Islam (31.8%)
3. Christianity (0.23%)
4. Others (0.74%)

According to the 2011 census, Hailakandi had a population of 33,637. Most of the people in the town follow Hinduism, with significant followers of Islam and a small Christian population.

== See also ==
- Hailakandi Airfield
- Netaji Subhas Chandra Bose Stadium
