= Karimganj (disambiguation) =

Karimganj may refer to:

- Karimganj district, a district in Assam, India
  - Karimganj, headquarter of Karimganj district
  - Karimganj Junction railway station, a railway station in Assam, India
  - Karimganj Lok Sabha constituency, a lokshaba constituency in India
  - Karimganj North Assembly constituency, a assembly constituency in Assam, India
  - Karimganj South Assembly constituency, a assembly constituency in Assam, India
- Karimganj Upazila, a upazila in Kishoreganj district, Bangladesh
- New Karimganj, a residential area in Gaya, India
- Old Karimganj, a residential area in Gaya, India
  - Karimganj cemetery, a burial ground in Old Karimganj
- Karimganj, Mainpuri, a village in Uttar Pradesh, India
