= Karimganj district =

Coordinates: 24.8667°N 92.3500°E

- District of Assam
- Sribhumi district
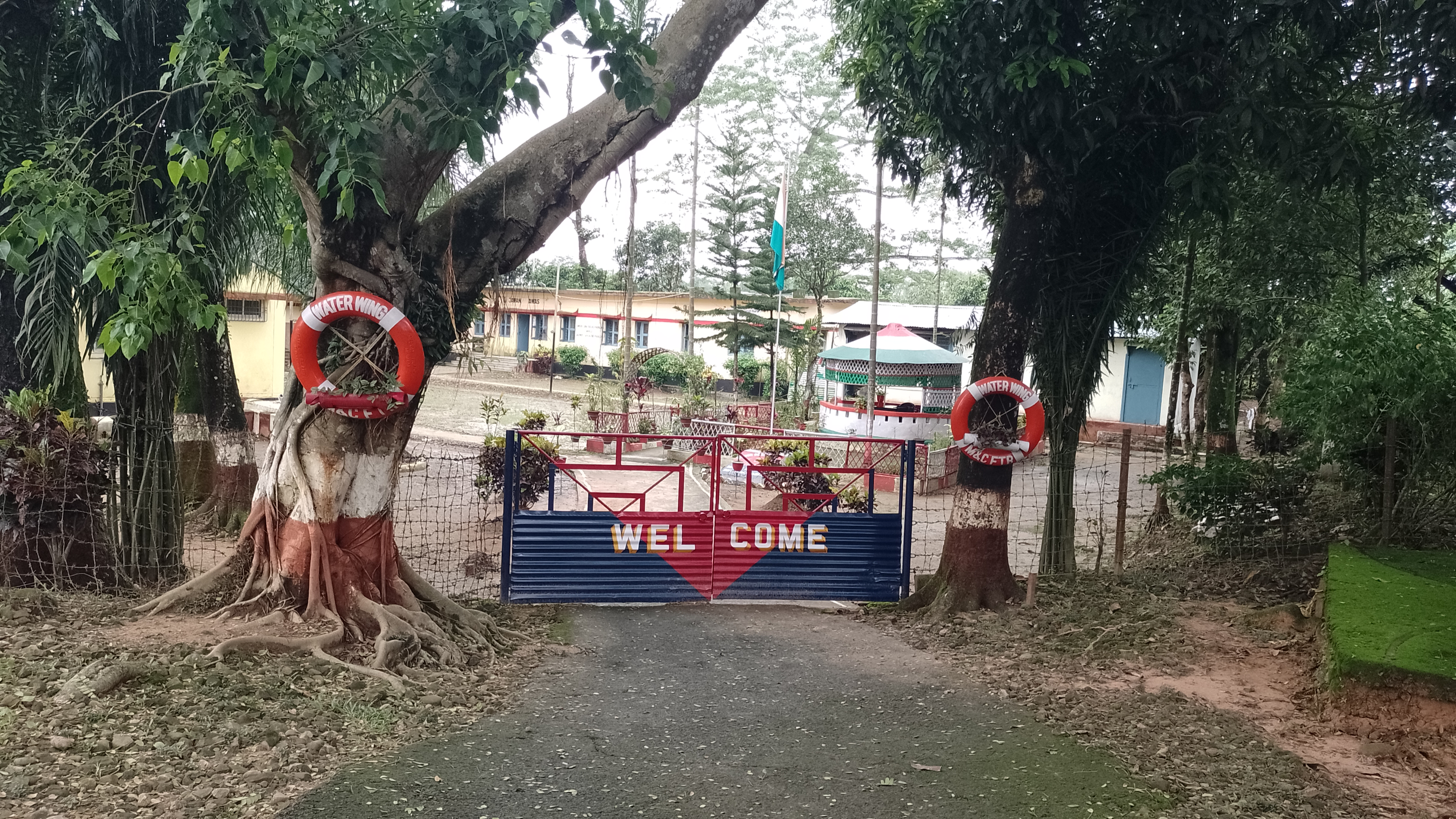
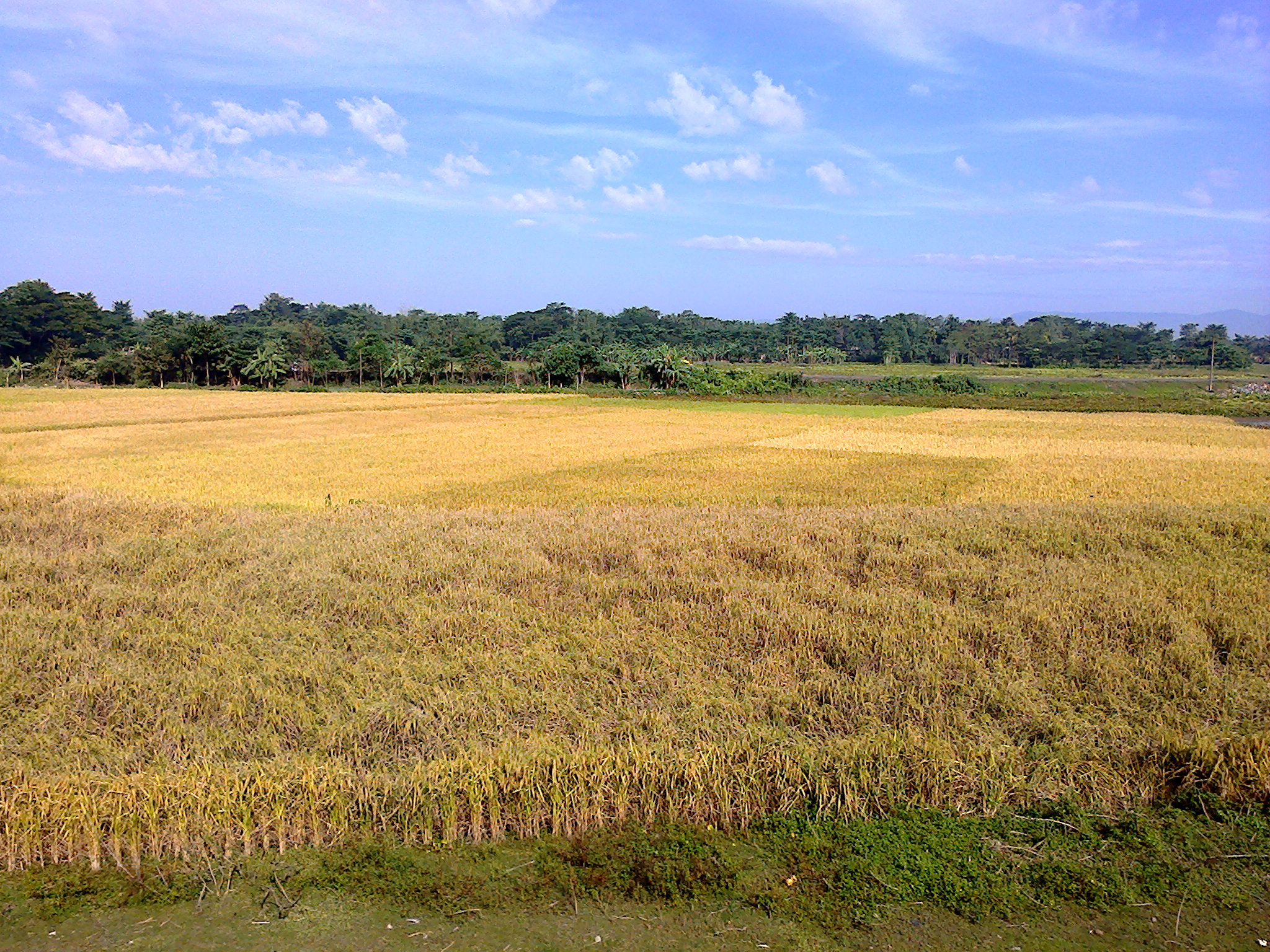
- Clockwise from top to bottom: A BSF camp in Karimganj district, Longai River near Karimganj town, Karimganj town, Paddy field in a village of Karimganj.

- Location in Assam
- Country: India
- State: Assam
- Division: Barak Valley
- Established: 1983
- Headquarters: Karimganj

Government
  - Lok Sabha constituencies: Karimganj (shared with Hailakandi district)
  - Vidhan Sabha constituencies: Ram Krishna Nagar, Patharkandi, Karimganj North, Karimganj South, Badarpur

Area
  - Total: 1,809 km^{2} (698 sq mi)

Population (2011)
  - Total: 1,228,686
  - Density: 679.2/km^{2} (1,759/sq mi)

Demographics
  - Literacy: 79.72%
  - Sex ratio: 961
  - Official languages: Bengali and Meitei (Manipuri)
- Time zone: UTC+05:30 (IST)
- Vehicle registration: AS10-XXXX
- Notable education Institutions: Barak Valley Engineering College
- Website: sribhumi.assam.gov.in

Karimganj district, officially Sribhumi district, is one of the 35 districts of the Indian state of Assam. The district headquarters and largest town is Karimganj. Located in southern Assam, it shares borders with the Indian state of Tripura and the Sylhet Division of Bangladesh. Alongside Cachar and Hailakandi, it forms the Barak Valley region. Historically, the area formed part of Sylhet District, and the Karimganj subdivision was created in 1878 with Karimganj town as its headquarters. Following the Partition of India in 1947, the truncated Karimganj subdivision remained in India and was incorporated into Cachar district as a full-fledged subdivision. It was carved out of Cachar district and upgraded to a separate district on 1 July 1983.

== Etymology ==
Rabindranath Tagore referred to the region as Sribhumi (শ্রীভূমি), and in November 2024, the district was officially renamed to reflect Tagore's vision. Previously known as Karimganj, the district derived its name from Muhammad Karim Chowdhury, a Bengali Muslim mirashdar who established a bazaar (market) near the confluence of the Natikhal and Kushiyara rivers.

== History ==
The present-day district formed part of the historic Sylhet region. From the medieval period, the area successively came under the kingdoms of Kamarupa and Samatata, the Bengal Sultanate, and later the Mughal Empire. Following the grant of the Diwani of Bengal to the British East India Company in 1765, the region became part of British-administered Sylhet district.

The Karimganj subdivision was created in 1878 under Sylhet district, with Karimganj town as its headquarters. The subdivision played a role in the Indian independence movement, including the Chargola Exodus, regarded as one of the earliest organised labour movements in the region.

At the time of the Partition of India in 1947, most of Sylhet district was transferred to East Pakistan following the Sylhet referendum. However, the Ratabari, Patharkandi, Badarpur and part of the Karimganj thana areas remained in India. The truncated Karimganj subdivision was subsequently incorporated into Cachar district of Assam as a full-fledged subdivision. The final boundary award came into effect on 17 August 1947, when the retained areas of the subdivision were formally incorporated into India.

The subdivision was upgraded to a district on 1 July 1983 by a Government of Assam notification issued on 14 June 1983.

=== Renaming ===
On 19 November 2024, the Assam Cabinet approved the renaming of Karimganj district as Sribhumi district. According to the state government, the name was adopted in reference to Rabindranath Tagore's description of the region as "Sribhumi" and to reflect its cultural heritage. The renaming was subsequently notified by the Government of Assam.

==== Protests and objections to renaming ====
The Assam government’s decision to rename Karimganj district as Sribhumi sparked widespread protests and objections from local residents, civil society groups, and opposition parties. Critics argued that the move lacked public consultation and undermined the district’s historical and cultural identity. Nearly 300,000 people signed a memorandum submitted to the Governor opposing the renaming, calling it politically motivated.

A 12-hour bandh was observed on 3 September 2025, backed by the Congress, Left parties, and several local organisations. Clashes broke out between protesters and police during demonstrations, resulting in injuries and detentions.

In early 2025, more than 200,000 citizens signed another petition urging the government to retain the name Karimganj, describing the renaming as unilateral and harmful to the district’s heritage.

== Geography ==
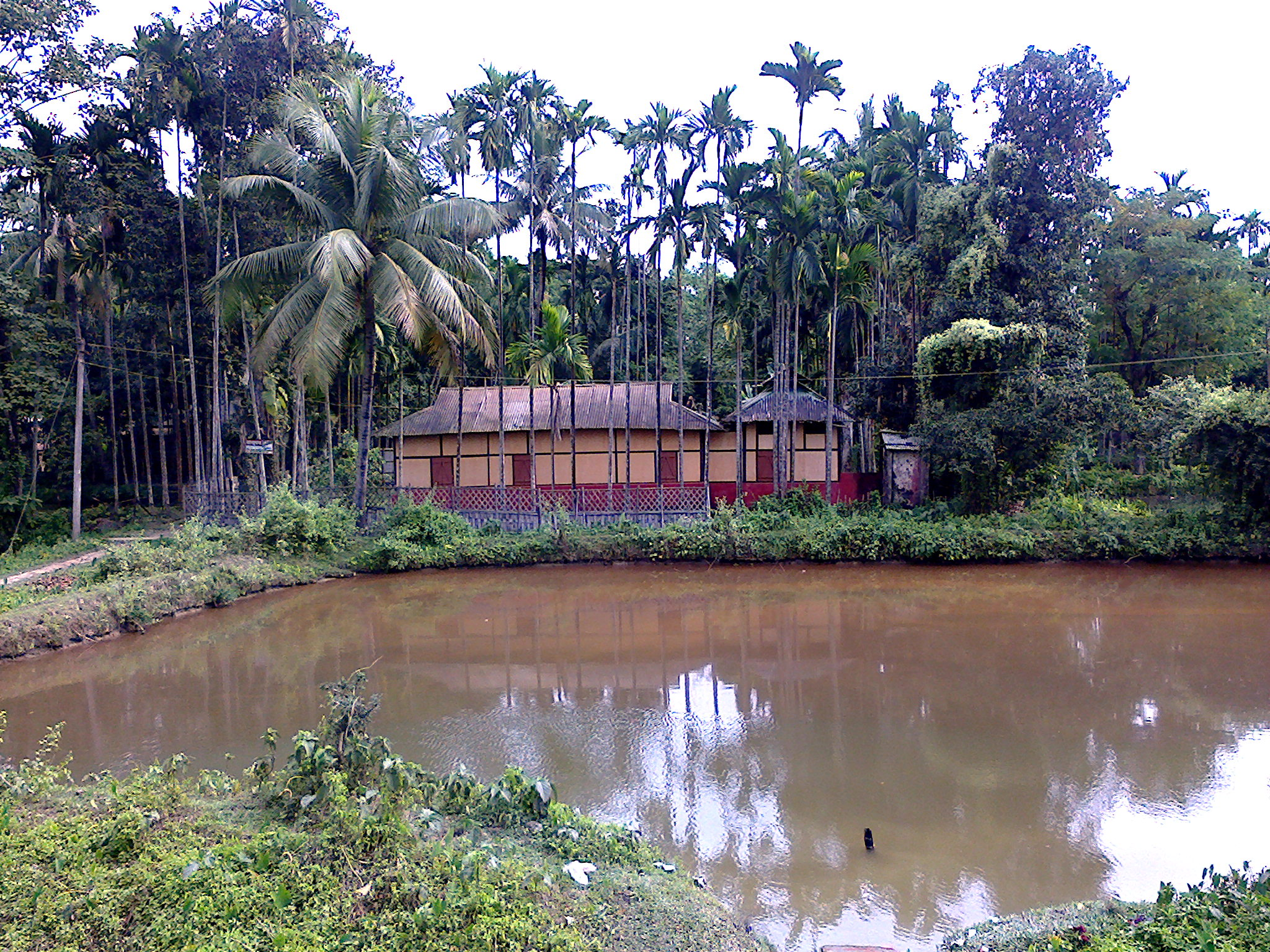
A typical house of Karimganj

Karimganj district occupies an area of 1,809 square kilometres (698 sq mi), comparatively equivalent to Alaska's Afognak Island. It is bordered on the northeast by Cachar District, east and south by Hailakandi District, south by Mizoram, southwest by Tripura state, and on the west and northwest by Bangladesh. Karimganj, the administrative headquarters and main town of the district, also bears the same name. Karimganj town is located on the northern fringe of the district adjoining Bangladesh by the Kushiyara River.

Its distance from Guwahati – the largest city of Assam - is approximately 330 km by road and about 350 km by rail. Distances to other important cities are as follows: Silchar – 55 km, Shillong – 220 km, Agartala – 250 km. Flanked on two sides by the Kushiyara and Longai rivers, Karimganj town is located just on the Bangladesh border, with the Kushiyara river flowing in between. One prominent feature of the place is a long and winding canal called Noti Khal, meandering through the town. Earlier, it used to be a connecting riverway between Kushiyara and Longai, facilitating river communication and also balancing water levels between the two rivers. Now, however, this canal has been blocked at several places through embankments and landfills to pave the way for road transport and construction works. Karimganj and the Barak valley have been prone to serious flooding for decades. The recent floods that caused significant damage were in 1976, 1988, and 2007.

=== Wildlife ===
The forests of Karimganj were once rich in wildlife but are now vanishing due to hunting, deforestation, and urbanisation. Rare species found in the region include the Tiger, Hoolock gibbon, Porcupine, Golden Langur, Monkey, Fox, Asian Elephant, Giant river otter, macaws, parrots, Parakeets, Hornbill, different types of local and migratory birds, Snakes, Capybara, etc. These animals are found mostly in the Patharia Hills reserve forest. Many have suggested it be named an official wildlife sanctuary due to its biodiversity, with another sanctuary being created in the southern part of the forest named Dhaleswari Wildlife Sanctuary.

== Demographics ==
Historical population
Year	Pop.	±% p.a.
1901	215,521	—
1911	243,399	+1.22%
1921	251,172	+0.31%
1931	266,007	+0.58%
1941	291,320	+0.91%
1951	378,324	+2.65%
1961	465,198	+2.09%
1971	582,108	+2.27%
1991	827,063	+1.77%
2001	1,007,976	+2.00%
2011	1,228,686	+2.00%

According to the 2011 census, Karimganj district has a population of 1,228,686, roughly equal to the nation of Bahrain or the US state of New Hampshire. This gives it a ranking of 392nd in India (out of a total of 640). The district has a population density of 673 inhabitants per square kilometre (1,740/sq mi). Its population growth rate over the decade 2001-2011 was 20.74%. Karimganj has a sex ratio of 961 females for every 1,000 males, and a literacy rate of 79.72%. 8.93% of the population lives in urban areas. Scheduled Castes and Scheduled Tribes make up 12.85% and 0.16% of the population respectively.

=== Religion ===
Religion in Karimganj district (2011)
1. Islam (56.4%)
2. Hinduism (42.5%)
3. Others (1.15%)

Religious demographics are as follows:

- Muslims - 692,489
- Hindus - 521,962
- Christians - 11,990.

Population of circles (sub-districts) by religion
Circle	Muslims (%)	Hindus (%)	Christians (%)	Others (%)
Karimganj	57.16	42.36	0.22	0.26
Badarpur	64.91	34.49	0.37	0.24
Nilambazar	75.30	24.24	0.35	0.12
Patharkandi	45.74	51.55	2.49	0.23
Ramkrishna Nagar	40.28	58.42	1.21	0.09

According to 2011 Indian Census, the Muslims form majority in the district constituting 56.4% of the population, with Hindus at 42.5% of the population, followed by 1.0% Christians. Small populations of Jain, Buddhists and Sikhs also reside in the district.

=== Language ===
Languages in Karimganj district (2011)
1. Bengali (86.8%)
2. Hindi (5.70%)
3. Bishnupriya Manipuri (2.00%)
4. Bhojpuri (1.65%)
5. Others (3.81%)

Bengali and Meitei (Manipuri) are the official languages of Karimganj district.

According to the 2011 census, 86.84% of the district spoke Bengali, 5.70% Hindi, 2.00% Bishnupriya and 1.65% Bhojpuri as their first language. Bengali is the official language in Karimganj along with the other two districts of Barak valley which includes, Hailakandi and Cachar. Although Bengali is the official language, the most common spoken language is Sylheti, often considered as a dialect of Bengali. It is also spoken in other districts of the Barak Valley.

Notable minority languages include Bishnupriya and Meitei, Dimasa, and Kokborok. There are also small tribal communities like Hrangkhol, Kuki, Khasi, and Sakachep.

== Administration ==
=== Divisions ===
Karimganj district has one subdivision and five revenue circles (tehsils): Karimganj, Badarpur, Nilambazar, Patharkandi and Ramkrishna Nagar. The district contains two statutory towns, Karimganj and Patharkandi, seven police stations (Karimganj, Badarpur, Ramkrishna Nagar, Patharkandi, Ratabari, Nilambazar and Bazaricherra), and 95 gram panchayats.

=== Politics ===
There are five Assam Legislative Assembly constituencies in the district: Ram Krishna Nagar, Patharkandi, Karimganj North, Karimganj South, and Badarpur. Of these, Ram Krishna Nagar is reserved for Scheduled Castes. All five constituencies are part of the Karimganj Lok Sabha constituency.

=== Judiciary ===
The district judiciary is headed by the District and Sessions Judge, Sribhumi. The judicial establishment traces its origins to the post-1857 period, when civil and criminal courts were established at Latu village. In 1886, the courts were shifted to Karimganj town. Following the creation of Karimganj district in 1983, a separate District and Sessions Court was established for the district.

As of 2026, the district judiciary comprises 11 courts functioning under the District and Sessions Judge, including civil and criminal courts. The district also has three Foreigners’ Tribunals.

== Economy ==
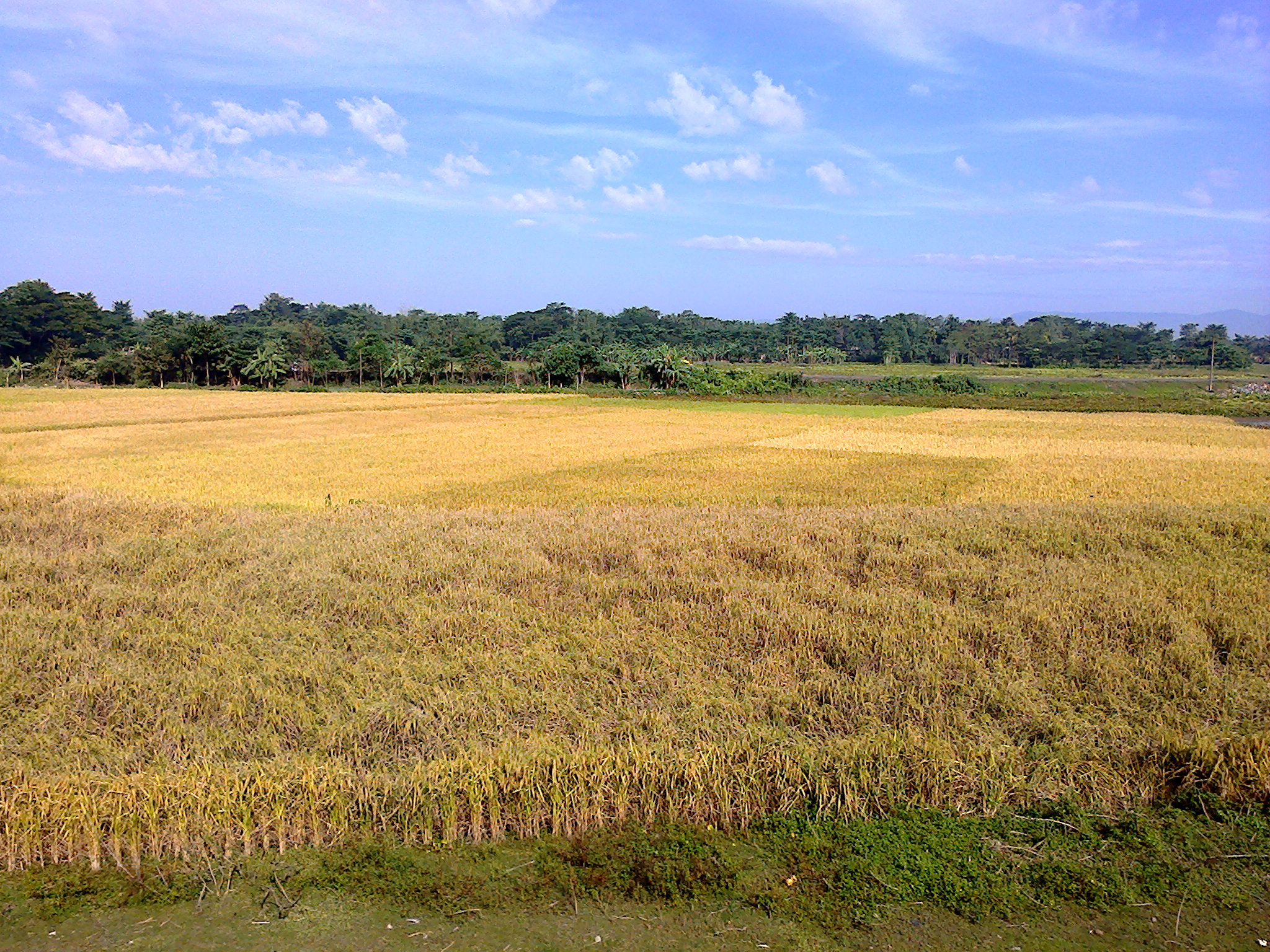
Karimganj is an agricultural district

The town of Karimganj is an important centre of trade and commerce in northeastern India. Its river port is capable of handling large volumes of cargo carried by ships coming through rivers via Bangladesh. Karimganj is also a border trade centre and import-export business worth crores of rupees carried out through the custom trade point at Dakbangla Ghat in the town and the Sutarkandi Custom Station.

Karimganj is an agricultural district. Historically, tea has been the major agricultural product of the Cachar region including Karimganj.

== Transport ==
The nearest airport is Kumbhirgram (85 km) near Silchar, in Cachar. Karimganj town is also an important river port and has seasonal cargo and freight transport links with Kolkata through river ways via Bangladesh.

=== Railway ===
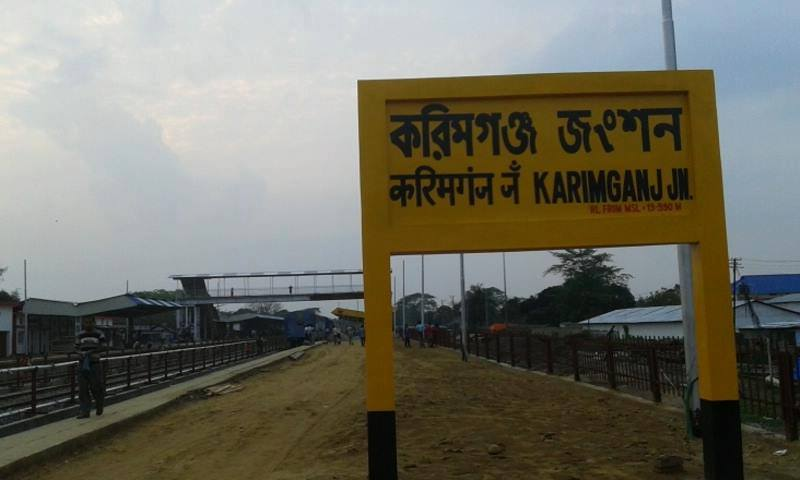
New BG station, Karimganj Junction

Karimganj town is linked via both rail and road transport with the rest of India. Karimganj town has a railway junction, with broad gauge lines connecting Assam with Tripura pass through this station. Badarpur railway station is the biggest junction of the district.

=== Road ===
The most popular mode of passenger transport is road. A good number of buses - mostly night services - ply between Karimganj and Guwahati daily. Direct long-distance bus services are also available to Shillong, Agartala, and Aizawl. Communication with Silchar, Badarpur, Patharkandi and other nearby places is also mainly dependent on road transport, with services by all sorts of light and heavy vehicles available at frequent intervals.

==== Sutarkandi international border crossing ====
The district is home to the Sutarkandi International border crossing, which is on Bangladesh–India border on Karimganj-Beanibazar route.

== Notable people ==
- Jamal Uddin Ahmed - former MLA of Badarpur (2001-2006, 2011-2021)
- Siddique Ahmed - MLA of Karimganj South
- Syed Mujtaba Ali - author, journalist, travel enthusiast, academic, scholar and linguist
- Syed Murtaza Ali - author, and historian
- Radheshyam Biswas - former MP for Karimganj
- Abdul Munim Choudhury - former MLA of Karimganj South
- Achyut Charan Choudhury - historian
- Khaled Choudhury - theatre personality
- Najib Ali Choudhury - Islamic scholar and founder of Assam's first madrasa (Madinatul Uloom Bagbari)
- Dwarka Nath Das - former MP for Karimganj
- Mission Ranjan Das - former MLA of Karimganj North (1991–1996, 1999–2006), Rajya Sabha MP (2024- )
- Nepal Chandra Das - former MP for Karimganj
- Gurusaday Dutt - civil servant, folklorist, and writer
- Ketaki Prasad Dutta - former president of the District Sports Association, Karimganj
- Shukhendu Shekhar Dutta - former MLA of Patharkandi
- Zohurul Hoque - translator of the Qur'an into Bengali, Assamese and English
- Adam Khaki - 14th-century Sufi missionary
- Aziz Ahmed Khan - former MLA of Karimganj South
- Bijoy Malakar - MLA of Ratabari
- Kripanath Mallah - MP of Karimganj, former Deputy Speaker in the Assam Legislative Assembly
- Sambhu Sing Mallah - former MLA of Ratabari
- Abu Saleh Najmuddin - former MLA of Badarpur (1991–1996, 1996–2001), and former Minister of Assam.
- Krishnendu Paul - present MLA of Patharkandi
- Kamalakhya Dey Purkayastha - MLA of Karimganj North
- Ramapayare Rabidas - former MLA of Ratabari
- Kartik Sena Sinha - former MLA of Patharkandi
- Lalit Mohan Suklabaidya - former MP for Karimganj
- Sananta Tanty - poet
- Madhusudhan Tiwari - former MLA of Patharkandi (1991–1996)

== See also ==
- Sadarashi
