= Nilambazar =

- Small town
- Location in Assam, India Nilambazar (India)
- Coordinates: 24°45′0″N 92°21′0″E
- Country: India
- State: Assam
- District: Karimganj

Government
  - Body: Nilambazar Gaon Panchaiat
- Elevation: 14 m (46 ft)

Languages
  - Official: Bengali and Meitei (Manipuri)
- Time zone: UTC+5:30 (IST)
- PIN: 788722
- Lok Sabha constituency: Karimganj (Lok Sabha constituency)
- Vidhan Sabha constituency: Nilambazar (Assembly constituency)

Nilambazar is a village located in Karimganj district in the Indian state of Assam. It is 329.9 kilometres south of the state capital Guwahati and 16.1 kilometres south of the district headquarters Karimganj.

Bengali and Meitei (Manipuri) are the official languages of this place.

== Geography ==
Nilambazar is located at 24°N 92°E. It has an average elevation of 14 metres (46 feet).

=== Roadways ===
Regular bus services connect Nilambazar with Guwahati, Shillong and Agartala via NH 8 (previously NH 44).

== Religion ==
It's a block of Karimganj District with the highest percentage of Muslim. Almost one fourth of the population also follow Hinduism.

Religion in Nilambazar (2011)
Religion	Percent
Islam	75.30%
Hinduism	24.24%
Christianity	0.35%
Other or not stated	0.12%

== See also ==
- Farampasha
