= Farampasha =

- Village
- Location in Assam, India Farampasha (India)
- Coordinates: 24°45′0″N 92°21′0″E
- Country: India
- State: Assam
- District: Karimganj

Area
  - Total: 5.013 km^{2} (1.936 sq mi)

Population
  - Total: 4,412
- Demonym: Farampashi

Languages
  - Official: Bengali and Meitei (Manipuri)
- Time zone: UTC+5:30 (IST)
- PIN: 788722
- Lok Sabha constituency: Karimganj
- Vidhan Sabha constituency: Karimganj South

Farampasha (Bengali: ফারমপাশা, Bengali pronunciation: [farɔmpaʃa]), also spelt Farampassa, is a village and gram panchayat located in Nilambazar block, Karimganj district in the Indian state of Assam. It is 18 kilometres south of the district headquarters Karimganj. Farampasha is composed of three parts, collectively with a population of 4412, 1617 households and total area of 5.013 square kilometres.

Bengali and Meitei (Manipuri) are the official languages of this place.

== History ==
Farampasha was formerly a part of the Dewadi pargana of Sylhet district. Following the conquest of Sylhet in 1303, Muslims started to settle in Dewadi and nearby areas. A traveller named Muluk Suwai cleared the jungles of Dewadi, and established his home there. During a visit to the Shah Jalal Dargah in Sylhet, Suwai was asked where his residence was. His reply is preserved in a proverb recorded by the historian Achyut Charan Choudhury:

গাছে পিঠা গোবাটে দই
মোর সঙ্গে নি যাইবায় কই?

Gachhe Piṭha, Gobaṭe Dôi
Mor Shônge Ni Jaibay Kôi?

Though the apparent translation would be "Such a place where pithas grow from trees and curd is found at the cowshed, would anyone intend to go with me?." In reality, Suwai was figuratively referring to the pithakara fruit, clay (not curd) and uncivilised paths used by cows, which determines the state of Dewadi prior to its development. Samiruddin, one of the dargah's pirs, was amazed at the pithas growing on trees and decided to join Suwai on his journey home. Samiruddin died during his visit to Dewadi, and was the mazar (mausoleum) containing his tomb is still preserved there. Muluk Suwai was buried next to him after his death.

Farampasha later became the seat of a Bengali Muslim Zamindar clan known as the 'Chowdhuries of Dewadi pargana'. They rose to prominence under Majlis Alam, who permitted the Nawab of Sylhet to send his sister Rupavati off to the andar mahal of the emperor in Delhi. The Nawab rewarded him for his offering by awarding him the jagir of Dewadi. Several royal masons and artisans were dispatched from Delhi to partake in a mosque construction project in Majlis Alam's territory. However, the artisans mocked Majlis Alam for his 'little wealth' and as a result, were executed. When news of this incident reached the courts of Delhi, a contingent of armed horsemen were sent to punish those responsible. As a result, Majlis Alam was said to have committed suicide and was succeeded by his son, and then his daughter's son Shah Masud. The large dighis (ponds) of Farampasha echo the former glory of Zamindar Majlis Alam and that area is known as Dighirpar. The largest of the ponds is Dhalidighi and Majlis Alam's house was situated on its western banks. The ruins of the large ghat of this pond can still be seen. Another large pond of Dighirpar is the Balidighi, north of which was a Hindu hamlet which ceased to exist in the late nineteenth century. Shah Masud was succeeded by Muzafal Khan, who was granted the title of Chowdhury. His son and successor was Mahabbat Khan. In the middle of the eighteenth century, the property was split between Khan's two sons; Kar Muhammad and Deen Muhammad. Kar Muhammad was succeeded by Muhammad Faiz, whose successor was Muhammad Hadi. Hadi's son Ghulam Najab relocated with his family to the neighbouring village of Bhagirkhola, just north of Farampasha.

== Geography ==
Nilambazar is located at 24°N 92°E. It has an average elevation of 14 metres (46 feet).

=== Roadways ===
Regular bus services connect Farampasha with Guwahati, Shillong and Agartala via NH 8 (previously NH 44).

== Notable people ==
- Aziz Ahmed Khan, politician
