= Patharkandi railway station =

Railway station in Assam

Patharkandi

General information
- Location: Patharkandi, Karimganj, Assam; India
- Coordinates: 24°36′38″N 92°19′20″E
- Elevation: 26 metres (85 ft)
- System: Indian Railways station
- Line: Lumding–Sabroom section
- Platforms: 1
- Connections: Auto, rickshaw, bus, taxi

Construction
- Structure type: Standard (on-ground station)

Other information
- Status: Functioning
- Station code: PTKD
- Fare zone: Northeast Frontier Railway zone

History
- Opened: 1925
- Former names: Assam Bengal Railway
Location
- Location within Assam Location within India

Patharkandi railway station is located in the eastern part of Patharkandi, in Assam, India. The station has one platform. It is part of the Lumding–Sabroom section of the Northeast Frontier Railway Zone of Indian Railways.

== See also ==
- Patharkandi
- Patharkandi (Assembly constituency)
