= Sirajul Hoque Choudhury =

Indian politician

Member of the Assam Legislative Assembly
- In office 1985–1991
- Preceded by: Ketaki Prasad Dutta
- Succeeded by: Mission Ranjan Das
- Constituency: Karimganj North
- In office 1996–2001
- Preceded by: Mission Ranjan Das
- Succeeded by: Mission Ranjan Das
- Constituency: Karimganj North

Personal details
- Party: Asom Gana Parishad

Sirajul Hoque Choudhury is an Indian politician. He was elected to the Assam Legislative Assembly from Karimganj North in the 1985 and 1996 Assam Legislative Assembly election as a member of the Asom Gana Parishad.
