= Patharkandi =

- Town
- Location in Assam, India Patharkandi (India)
- Coordinates: 24°36′31″N 92°19′17″E
- Country: India
- State: Assam
- District: Karimganj

Government
  - Type: Municipal Board
  - Body: Patharkandi Municipal Board
- Elevation: 14 m (46 ft)
- Time zone: UTC+5:30 (IST)
- PIN: 788724
- Vehicle registration: AS-10
- Lok Sabha constituency: Karimganj Lok Sabha constituency
- Assembly constituency: Patharkandi Assembly constituency

Patharkandi is a town in the Karimganj district of the Indian state of Assam. Situated in the Barak Valley region of southern Assam, it lies approximately 32 kilometres south of Karimganj, the district headquarters, and about 350 kilometres from the state capital, Guwahati. The town is located near the borders of Tripura and Mizoram and serves as an important centre for the surrounding rural areas.

Administratively, Patharkandi falls under the Patharkandi Assembly constituency and the Karimganj Lok Sabha constituency. The town is connected to other parts of Assam and Northeast India through road and rail networks, and is served by Patharkandi railway station on the Lumding–Sabroom line of the Northeast Frontier Railway.

Bengali is the principal official language of the region, while Meitei (Manipuri) has been recognised as an associate official language in the district. The town is part of a linguistically and culturally diverse area of the Barak Valley.

== Geography ==
Patharkandi is located in the southern part of the Indian state of Assam, within the Barak Valley region. It is situated in Karimganj district, approximately 32 kilometres south of Karimganj, the district headquarters, and lies near the borders of Tripura and Mizoram. The town is located at an elevation of about 14 metres (46 ft) above sea level.

The region experiences a humid subtropical climate characterised by hot and humid summers, a monsoon season with heavy rainfall, and mild winters. The surrounding area consists primarily of plains, agricultural land and rural settlements.

== Politics ==
Patharkandi is part of the Patharkandi Assembly constituency and the Karimganj Lok Sabha constituency.

== Transport ==
=== Road ===
Patharkandi is connected by road to other parts of Assam and neighbouring states through National Highway 6, which serves as an important transport corridor linking the Barak Valley with the rest of Northeast India.

=== Rail ===
The town is served by Patharkandi railway station on the Badarpur–Agartala railway route under the Lumding Division of the Northeast Frontier Railway.

== Education ==
Patharkandi is an educational centre for the surrounding areas of southern Karimganj district. The town is home to Patharkandi College, a higher educational institution affiliated with Assam University. In addition, several government and private schools serve the educational needs of the town and neighbouring rural areas.

== History ==
The area of present-day Patharkandi formed part of the historical Sylhet region during the colonial period. Following the 1947 Sylhet referendum, most of Sylhet district was transferred to East Pakistan (now Bangladesh), while the Karimganj subdivision, including Patharkandi, remained in India and became part of the state of Assam.

Historically, the region was associated with the Pratapgarh area, which formed part of the wider historical and cultural landscape of present-day southern Assam and adjoining regions.

== Administration ==
Patharkandi is administered by the Patharkandi Municipal Board. In October 2024, the Assam Cabinet approved the establishment of the municipal board under Section 4 of the Assam Municipal Act, 1956. The board comprises ten wards covering seven revenue villages and replaced the existing Patharkandi Gaon Panchayat as the urban local body for the town.

== See also ==
- Patharkandi railway station
- Patharkandi (Assembly constituency)
- Karimganj district
- Barak valley
