= 1996 Assam Legislative Assembly election =

Indian state election

- 27 April 1996

122 seats in the Assam Legislative Assembly 62 seats needed for a majority
- Registered: 12,119,125
- Turnout: 78.92%
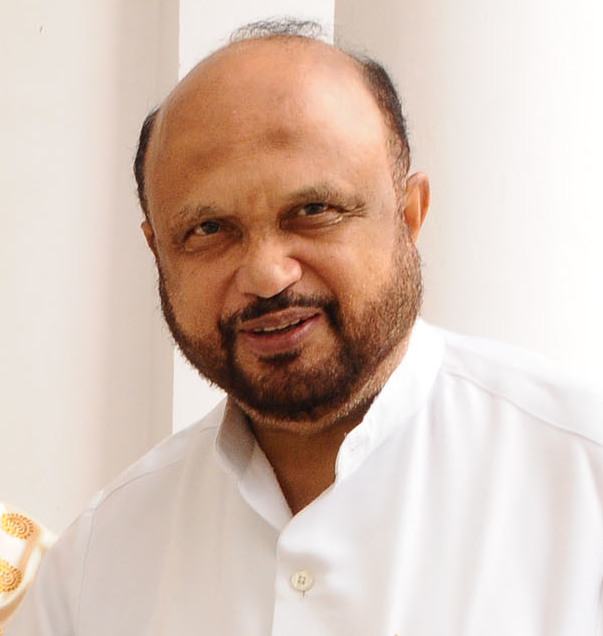

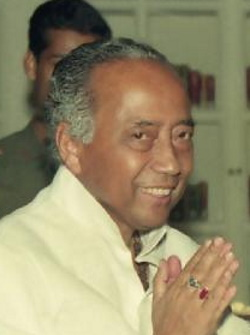
	Majority party	Minority party
Leader	Prafulla Kumar Mahanta	Hiteswar Saikia
Party	AGP	INC
Seats won	59	34
Seat change	▲40	▼32
Popular vote	29.70%	30.56%
CM before election
Bhumidhar Barman
INC
Elected CM
Prafulla Kumar Mahanta
AGP

Elections to the Assam Legislative Assembly were held in April 1996 to elect members of 122 constituencies in Assam, India. The Indian National Congress (INC) won the popular vote, but the Asom Gana Parishad (AGP) won the most seats and Prafulla Kumar Mahanta was appointed as the Chief Minister of Assam for his second term. The number of constituencies was set as 126, by the recommendation of the Delimitation Commission of India, but elections were held in only 122 constituencies. The constituencies of Dispur, Dergaon, Nazira and Margherita did not go to polls immediately, but they had polls in November 1996.

== Background ==
In 1991, the Indian Army was tasked with executing Operation Rhino against the United Liberation Front of Assam. In 1993, the six-year agitation by the All Bodo Students' Union in Assam demanding a separate state within India ended with a peace accord that established an autonomous district council.

The Chief Minister of Assam, Hiteswar Saikia, died in Delhi, on 22 April 1996, only 5 days before the election. Bhumidhar Barman was sworn in as interim chief-minister, but as the Indian National Congress failed to form the government after the elections, his tenure lasted 22 days. The party's defeat was attributed to Saikia's death, which unravelled the electoral coalition he had built up in opposition to the resurgent Asom Gana Parishad.

In 1991, former Home Minister, Bhrigu Kumar Phukan, formed the Natun Asom Gana Parishad (NAGP) in opposition to the policies of Asom Gana Parishad leader, Prafulla Kumar Mahanta. Phukan merged the NAGP back with the AGP before the 1996 elections. The AGP formed also a five-party pre-poll electoral alliance before the elections with the CPI, the CPI(M), the ASDC and the UMFA.

== Parties and alliances ==
Party	Flag	Symbol	Leader	Seats
Indian National Congress			Hiteswar Saikia	122

AGP-led Alliance
Party	Flag	Symbol	Leader	Seats
Asom Gana Parishad			Prafulla Kumar Mahanta	95
Communist Party of India (Marxist)				10
Communist Party of India				9
Autonomous State Demand Committee			Jayanta Rongpi	5
United Minorities Front, Assam			Kalipada Sen	3
Total				122

== Result ==
Party	Votes	%	Seats	+/–
Indian National Congress	2,778,627	30.56	34	▼32
Asom Gana Parishad	2,700,934	29.70	59	▲40
Bharatiya Janata Party	946,236	10.41	4	▼6
All India Indira Congress (Tiwari)	337,668	3.71	2	New
Autonomous State Demand Committee	179,877	1.98	5	▲1
Communist Party of India	177,750	1.95	3	▼1
Communist Party of India (Marxist)	176,721	1.94	2	0
United Minorities Front, Assam	105,408	1.16	2	New
Others	105,471	1.16	0	0
Independents	1,584,109	17.42	11	▼4
Total	9,092,801	100.00	122	▼4
Valid votes	9,092,801	95.07		
Invalid/blank votes	471,632	4.93		
Total votes	9,564,433	100.00		
Registered voters/turnout	12,119,125	78.92		
Source: ECI

== Elected members ==
Constituency		Winner				Runner Up				Margin	%
#	Name	Candidate	Party	Votes	%	Candidate	Party	Votes	%	Margin	%
1	Ratabari (SC)	Sambhu Sing Mallah	BJP	23,463	32.70	Rathish Ranjan Choudhury	CPI(M)	22,563	31.44	900	1.26
2	Patharkandi	Shukhendu Shekhar Dutta	BJP	20,618	23.71	Moni Lal Gowala	INC	19,823	22.80	795	0.91
3	Karimganj North	Sirajul Hoque Choudhury	AGP	36,866	39.63	Mission Ranjan Das	BJP	35,561	38.23	1,305	1.40
4	Karimganj South	Abdul Muqtadir Choudhury	INC	43,158	47.79	Biswarup Bhattacharjee	BJP	30,008	33.23	13,150	14.56
5	Badarpur	Abu Saleh Najmuddin	INC	30,138	40.93	Dipak Deb	BJP	24,891	33.81	5,247	7.12
6	Hailakandi	Abdul Muhib Mazumder	IND	55,873	63.08	Chittendra Nath Mazumder	BJP	25,161	28.41	30,712	34.67
7	Katlicherra	Gautam Roy	INC	59,899	66.24	Benulal Ghose	AGP	25,429	28.12	34,470	38.12
8	Algapur	Sahidul Alam Choudhury	AGP	47,947	56.28	Ashok Dutta Gupta	INC	27,738	32.56	20,209	23.72
9	Silchar	Bimalangshu Roy	BJP	42,293	43.41	Kamalendu Bhattacharjee	INC	40,774	41.85	1,519	1.56
10	Sonai	Anwar Hussain Laskar	AGP	42,519	52.46	Trailakshya Bhusan Nath	IND	19,118	23.59	23,401	28.87
11	Dholai (SC)	Girindra Mallik	INC	27,032	35.49	Kamakshya Prasad Mala	AGP	23,947	31.44	3,085	4.05
12	Udharbond	Jagannath Sinha	INC	23,900	34.67	Joy Prakash Tewari	AGP	20,013	29.03	3,887	5.64
13	Lakhipur	Dinesh Prasad Goala	INC	45,961	58.47	Audesh Kumar Singh	BJP	22,533	28.66	23,428	29.81
14	Barkhola	Misbahul Islam Laskar	INC	32,934	47.65	Nripendra Kr. Deb	BJP	20,552	29.74	12,382	17.91
15	Katigora	Kali Ranjan Deb	BJP	27,180	33.42	Anil Ch. Dey	INC	20,687	25.44	6,493	7.98
16	Haflong (ST)	Samarjit Haflongbar	ASDC	35,074	54.58	Gobinda Ch. Langthasa	INC	21,403	33.30	13,671	21.28
17	Bokajan (ST)	Jagat Sing Engti	ASDC	34,201	57.94	Ashwen Jishing Rengma	IND	13,623	23.08	20,578	34.86
18	Howraghat (ST)	Chandra Kanta Terang	ASDC	31,833	54.16	Brojen Langthasa	IND	15,303	26.04	16,530	28.12
19	Diphu (ST)	Hemsing Tisso	ASDC	31,132	41.80	Lutsat Singson	IND	21,637	29.05	9,495	12.75
20	Baithalangso (ST)	Holiram Terang	ASDC	47,637	55.56	Khorsing Bey	INC	34,362	40.07	13,275	15.49
21	Mankachar	Aminul Islam	AGP	42,312	48.83	Zahirul Islam	INC	40,248	46.45	2,064	2.38
22	Salmara South	Wazed Ali Choudhury	INC	43,355	59.65	Dewan Joynal Abedin	IND	16,858	23.19	26,497	36.46
23	Dhubri	Nazibul Umar	INC	30,806	39.13	Dhruba Kumar Sen	BJP	23,902	30.36	6,904	8.77
24	Gauripur	Banendra Kumar Mushahary	IND	27,480	32.13	Mohibul Haque	INC	24,489	28.64	2,991	3.49
25	Golakganj	Alauddin Sarkar	CPI	37,264	45.23	Dinesh Chandra Sarkar	BJP	36,748	44.60	516	0.63
26	Bilasipara West	Ali Akbar Miah	AIIC(T)	18,151	25.99	Giasuddin Ahmed	CPI	15,613	22.36	2,538	3.63
27	Bilasipara East	Prasanta Kumar Barua	AGP	37,877	42.28	Anwar Hussain	INC	34,068	38.03	3,809	4.25
28	Gossaigaon	Rajendra Mushahary	AGP	26,466	36.86	Mathias Tudu	INC	19,418	27.04	7,048	9.82
29	Kokrajhar West (ST)	Hemendra Nath Brahma	IND	21,887	27.56	Jitendra Nath Roy	IND	15,070	18.98	6,817	8.58
30	Kokrajhar East (ST)	Pramila Rani Brahma	IND	37,553	45.09	Chitta Ranjan Brahma	IND	17,830	21.41	19,723	23.68
31	Sidli (ST)	Andrias Hajoary	IND	28,365	32.60	Chino Basumatary	IND	24,968	28.70	3,397	3.90
32	Bongaigaon	Phani Bhusan Choudhury	AGP	39,301	50.72	Chimang Brahma	IND	14,543	18.77	24,758	31.95
33	Bijni	Mohini Basumatary	IND	27,514	40.60	Ratneswar Ray	AGP	17,589	25.96	9,925	14.64
34	Abhayapuri North	Bhupen Ch. Ray	AGP	34,517	48.55	Abdul Hai Nagori	UMFA	32,773	46.10	1,744	2.45
35	Abhayapuri South (SC)	Rabin Banikya	AGP	43,549	57.04	Chandan Kumar Sarkar	INC	16,977	22.24	26,572	34.80
36	Dudhnai (ST)	Akan Rabha	AGP	23,389	29.76	Anandi Bala Rabha	INC	16,962	21.58	6,427	8.18
37	Goalpara East	Jyotish Das	AGP	21,647	26.79	Shadeed Mazumdar	IND	20,411	25.26	1,236	1.53
38	Goalpara West	Abu Bakkar Siddique Jotdar	INC	19,370	27.91	Nazmul Hoque	IND	13,663	19.69	5,707	8.22
39	Jaleswar	Afzalur Rahman	INC	25,474	40.42	Sahabuddin	AGP	18,863	29.93	6,611	10.49
40	Sorbhog	Hemen Das	CPI(M)	31,332	43.67	Samir Mazumdar	INC	11,799	16.45	19,533	27.22
41	Bhabanipur	Surendra Nath Medhi	AGP	23,463	37.46	Mati Ram Basumatary	IND	15,440	24.65	8,023	12.81
42	Patacharkuchi	Mohan Das	AGP	35,935	55.17	Pabindra Deka	INC	6,148	9.44	29,787	45.73
43	Barpeta	Ismail Hussain	AIIC(T)	23,255	32.51	Kumar Deepak Das	AGP	18,946	26.49	4,309	6.02
44	Jania	Abdur Rouf	UMFA	14,505	21.29	A. Jalil Talukdar	IND	13,659	20.05	846	1.24
45	Baghbar	Sheikh Abdul Hamid	UMFA	20,407	39.68	Dildar Razza	INC	13,717	26.67	6,690	13.01
46	Sarukhetri	Nizamuddin Khan	CPI(M)	21,375	28.47	Kandarpa Kumar Das	AIIC(T)	12,106	16.13	9,269	12.34
47	Chenga	Sukur Ali	INC	17,366	32.29	Abdul Kaddus	AGP	13,877	25.80	3,489	6.49
48	Boko (SC)	Jyoti Prasad Das	AGP	49,263	56.59	Gopinath Das	INC	34,992	40.20	14,271	16.39
49	Chaygaon	Kamala Kanta Kalita	AGP	39,103	50.06	Imran Shah	INC	34,997	44.81	4,106	5.25
50	Palasbari	Jatin Mali	AGP	44,643	60.89	Dinesh Choudhury	BJP	14,373	19.60	30,270	41.29
51	Jalukbari	Bhrigu Kumar Phukan	AGP	46,446	54.97	Himanta Biswa Sarma	INC	29,318	34.70	17,128	20.27
53	Gauhati East	Biraj Kumar Sarma	AGP	39,694	46.29	Naren Sarma	INC	23,093	26.93	16,601	19.36
54	Gauhati West	Ramendra Narayan Kalita	AGP	38,786	44.41	Hemanta Talukdar	INC	25,332	29.01	13,454	15.40
55	Hajo	Nurul Hussain	AGP	45,306	61.35	Nripen Ch. Das	BJP	11,588	15.69	33,718	45.66
56	Kamalpur	Maidul Islam Bora	AGP	43,205	55.14	Benudhar Kalita	IND	20,579	26.26	22,626	28.88
57	Rangiya	Thaneswar Boro	AGP	43,260	52.73	Umesh Kalita	INC	17,494	21.33	25,766	31.40
58	Tamulpur	Derhagra Mochahari	IND	27,770	33.10	Ramesh Mazumdar	AGP	20,089	23.95	7,681	9.15
59	Nalbari	Nagen Sarma	AGP	33,160	40.08	Hemanta Barman	IND	19,846	23.99	13,314	16.09
60	Barkhetry	Pulakesh Barua	AGP	46,928	52.39	Bhumidhar Barman	INC	40,166	44.84	6,762	7.55
61	Dharmapur	Chandra Mohan Patowary	AGP	47,894	70.60	Nilamani Sen Deka	INC	17,339	25.56	30,555	45.04
62	Barama (ST)	Rekha Rani Das Boro	AGP	28,656	39.41	Gangadhar Ramchiary	IND	18,790	25.84	9,866	13.57
63	Chapaguri (ST)	Jagmohan Basmatary	IND	31,926	40.16	Suren Swargiary	AGP	29,269	36.82	2,657	3.34
64	Panery	Kumud Chandra Das	IND	29,030	42.03	Mridula Saharia	INC	19,640	28.43	9,390	13.60
65	Kalaigaon	Mahendra Mohan Rai Choudhury	AGP	23,248	29.21	Bhupen Boro	IND	20,820	26.16	2,428	3.05
66	Sipajhar	Zoii Nath Sarmah	AGP	42,877	49.96	Madhab Rajbangshi	INC	37,877	44.13	5,000	5.83
67	Mangaldoi (SC)	Hiren Kumar Das	AGP	38,971	42.05	Nakul Das	INC	31,538	34.03	7,433	8.02
68	Dalgaon	Abdul Jabbar	AGP	36,287	43.08	Syada Anwara Taimur	INC	24,869	29.53	11,418	13.55
69	Udalguri (ST)	Deva Kanta Ramchiary	IND	36,798	52.39	Jaman Singh Brahma	INC	33,437	47.61	3,361	4.78
70	Majbat	Silvius Condpan	INC	24,192	36.55	Karendra Basumatary	IND	23,647	35.72	545	0.83
71	Dhekiajuli	Joseph Toppo	AGP	32,531	46.48	Hiranya Bora	INC	23,608	33.73	8,923	12.75
72	Barchalla	Prafulla Goswami	AGP	27,058	39.31	Rudra Parajuli	INC	20,664	30.02	6,394	9.29
73	Tezpur	Brindabon Goswami	AGP	30,706	44.68	Bizit Saikia	INC	28,873	42.01	1,833	2.67
74	Rangapara	Bhimananda Tanti	INC	32,555	47.67	Dhaniram Khosla	CPI(M)	18,450	27.02	14,105	20.65
75	Sootea	Padma Hazarika	AGP	31,721	40.84	Praneswar Basumatary	IND	18,144	23.36	13,577	17.48
76	Biswanath	Prabin Hazarika	AGP	30,186	42.62	Nurjamal Sarkar	INC	22,489	31.76	7,697	10.86
77	Behali	Barnabash Tanti	INC	18,535	33.43	Kosheswar Borah	AGP	10,479	18.90	8,056	14.53
78	Gohpur	Ganesh Kutum	AGP	33,664	36.72	Ripun Borah	INC	31,131	33.96	2,533	2.76
79	Jagiroad (SC)	Bubul Das	AGP	42,272	48.18	Dolly Bora	INC	24,923	28.40	17,349	19.78
80	Marigaon	Munin Mahanta	CPI	25,848	34.00	Jonjonali Barua	INC	21,433	28.19	4,415	5.81
81	Laharighat	Nazrul Islam	INC	33,434	48.12	Ganesh Saikia	AGP	17,170	24.71	16,264	23.41
82	Raha (SC)	Gahin Ch. Das	AGP	40,254	45.16	Ananda Ram Baruah	INC	30,224	33.91	10,030	11.25
83	Dhing	Mustafa Shahidul Islam	INC	29,665	35.98	Idrish Ali	AIIC(T)	29,188	35.40	477	0.58
84	Batadroba	Digen Chandra Borah	AGP	41,065	53.55	Bishnu Prasad	INC	24,790	32.33	16,275	21.22
85	Rupohihat	Rashidul Haque	INC	33,430	41.36	Abdul Aziz	AIIC(T)	29,827	36.90	3,603	4.46
86	Nowgong	Prafulla Kumar Mahanta	AGP	53,068	63.15	Mukut Sarma	INC	24,259	28.87	28,809	34.28
87	Barhampur	Prafulla Kumar Mahanta	AGP	48,377	62.17	Uma Phukan	INC	22,033	28.31	26,344	33.86
88	Samaguri	Atul Kumar Sharma	AGP	20,770	32.04	Abedur Rahman	AIIC(T)	19,532	30.13	1,238	1.91
89	Kaliabor	Gunin Hazarika	AGP	29,474	47.23	Dilip Kumar Mahanta	INC	22,609	36.23	6,865	11.00
90	Jamunamukh	Khalilur Rahman Chowdhury	AGP	28,899	38.66	Abdul Jalil Ragibi	INC	19,634	26.27	9,265	12.39
91	Hojai	Ardhendu Kumar Dey	INC	37,286	40.31	Kamal Dutta	AGP	32,237	34.85	5,049	5.46
92	Lumding	Hazi Abdur Rouf	AGP	38,502	49.29	Debesh Chandra Chakraborty	INC	26,250	33.60	12,252	15.69
93	Bokakhat	Bhupendra Nath Bhuyan	INC	21,558	36.81	Bhadreswar Tanti	AGP	20,179	34.45	1,379	2.36
94	Sarupathar	Binod Gowala	AGP	45,860	45.91	Aklius Tirkey	INC	37,811	37.85	8,049	8.06
95	Golaghat	Atul Bora	AGP	41,786	48.63	Nogen Neog	INC	29,896	34.79	11,890	13.84
96	Khumtai	Probin Gogoi	IND	23,099	36.81	Amiya Kumar Borah	AGP	16,881	26.90	6,218	9.91
98	Jorhat	Hitendranath Goswami	AGP	36,890	49.88	Padmanath Sarma	INC	22,200	30.02	14,690	19.86
99	Majuli (ST)	Karuna Dutta	AGP	17,934	28.97	Padmeshwar Doley	INC	12,726	20.56	5,208	8.41
100	Titabar	Hemanta Kalita	AGP	20,430	32.45	Kula Das	CPI	17,252	27.40	3,178	5.05
101	Mariani	Rupam Kurmi	INC	26,566	46.16	Bhaba Prasad Bora	AGP	21,150	36.75	5,416	9.41
102	Teok	Renupoma Rajkhowa	AGP	32,304	52.44	Membor Gogoi	INC	26,764	43.44	5,540	9.00
103	Amguri	Pradip Hazarika	AGP	33,119	53.19	Anjan Dutta	INC	26,316	42.26	6,803	10.93
105	Mahmara	Hiranya Kumar Konwar	AGP	24,238	39.34	Lakhi Prasad Borgohain	INC	18,270	29.65	5,968	9.69
106	Sonari	Sarat Borkataky	INC	52,052	61.80	Bani Changmai	AGP	20,588	24.45	31,464	37.35
107	Thowra	Debananda Konwar	INC	15,439	29.42	Rajendra Prasad Borah	IND	11,304	21.54	4,135	7.88
108	Sibsagar	Promode Gogoi	CPI	32,633	47.88	Pranab Gogoi	INC	30,055	44.10	2,578	3.78
109	Bihpuria	Kesharam Bora	AGP	25,913	39.91	Borgaram Deori	INC	16,179	24.92	9,734	14.99
110	Naoboicha	Mani Kr. Subba	INC	23,800	33.26	Nurul Haque Chowdhury	IND	16,649	23.26	7,151	10.00
111	Lakhimpur	Utpal Dutta	AGP	32,300	44.68	Makhan Chetia	INC	17,284	23.91	15,016	20.77
112	Dhakuakhana (ST)	Bharat Chandra Narah	INC	29,752	35.46	Mahesh Doley	AGP	27,119	32.32	2,633	3.14
113	Dhemaji (ST)	Dilip Kumar Saikia	AGP	36,315	39.66	Porna Kanta Pegu	INC	25,076	27.39	11,239	12.27
114	Jonai (ST)	Pradan Boruah	AGP	32,148	35.11	Ranoj Pegu	IND	25,865	28.25	6,283	6.86
115	Moran	Joy Chandra Nagbanshi	INC	27,181	45.44	Kiron Kumar Gogoi	AGP	26,919	45.00	262	0.44
116	Dibrugarh	Kalyan Kumar Gogoi	INC	22,523	40.72	Taranath Buragohain	AGP	16,531	29.89	5,992	10.83
117	Lahowal	Prithibi Majhi	INC	29,555	50.37	Karuna Hazarika	AGP	23,384	39.85	6,171	10.52
118	Duliajan	Amiya Gogoi	INC	29,531	47.77	Likheswar Gogoi	CPI	15,874	25.68	13,657	22.09
119	Tingkhong	Atuwa Munda	INC	28,910	44.86	Anup Phukan	AGP	26,953	41.82	1,957	3.04
120	Naharkatia	Pranati Phukan	INC	26,333	44.12	Sasha Kamal Handique	CPI(M)	21,061	35.29	5,272	8.83
121	Chabua	Bhaben Baruah	AGP	26,200	39.43	Upendra Sanatan	INC	25,318	38.10	882	1.33
122	Tinsukia	Sudhangshu Coomer De Sirkar	INC	35,552	55.22	Hemanta Gohain	AGP	14,007	21.75	21,545	33.47
123	Digboi	Rameswar Dhanowar	INC	34,234	61.98	Munin Borah	CPI	7,265	13.15	26,969	48.83
125	Doom Dooma	Dileswar Tanti	INC	40,505	67.17	Haradhan Kumar	AGP	10,545	17.49	29,960	49.68
126	Sadiya	Jogdish Bhuyan	AGP	27,511	40.02	Rajen Barua	INC	22,609	32.89	4,902	7.13

== Aftermath ==
On 6 May 1996, the Minister for Rural Development, and candidate for the Golaghat Assembly constituency, Nagen Neog was killed, by suspected terrorists. Along with him, 8 other people, including his driver, and 5 bodyguards, also died.

== Bye-elections ==
Date	Constituency	Winner	Party
11 November 1996	Dispur	Atul Bora	Asom Gana Parishad
11 November 1996	Nowgong (Note: Prafulla Kumar Mahanta resigned from this seat since he had also won the seat of Barhampur)	Girindra Kumar Baruah	Asom Gana Parishad
11 November 1996	Dergaon	Sushila Hazarika	Asom Gana Parishad
11 November 1996	Nazira	Hemprove Saikia	Indian National Congress
11 November 1996	Margherita	Tarun Gogoi	Indian National Congress

== See also ==
- List of constituencies of the Assam Legislative Assembly
- 1996 elections in India
