= Krishna Das (politician) =

Indian politician

Bharatiya Janata Party candidate for Karimganj, Assam (2014 Indian general election)
- Election date 12 April 2014-16 May 2014
- Opponents: Lalit Mohan Suklabaidya (INC); Radhey Shyam Biswas (AIUDF); Rinku Malakar (SP); Nani Sarkar (SUCI)
- Incumbent: Lalit Mohan Suklabaidya

Personal details
- Political party: Bharatiya Janata Party

Krishna Das is a Bharatiya Janata Party politician from Assam. He is a former chairman of the Karimganj Municipal Board, and was fielded as the candidate from the Karimganj constituency (reserved for Scheduled Castes) by his party in the 2014 Indian general election.

He is currently a member of the State Executive Board of BJP in Assam. Additionally, he is the chairperson of the SC Board of Karimganj district.
