= Najib Ali Choudhury =

Indian Islamic scholar

Maulana Najib Ali Choudhury

Personal life
- Born: Bagbari, Karimganj thana, Sylhet District
- Resting place: Rauthgram, Karimganj district, Assam, India
- Children: Gulam Rob Choudhury
- Era: Modern
- Relatives: Abdul Munim Choudhury (great-grandson)

Religious life
- Religion: Islam
- Denomination: Sunni
- Jurisprudence: Hanafi
- Tariqa: Chishti
- Movement: Deobandi
- Profession: Islamic scholar and teacher

Muslim leader
- Teacher: Imdadullah Muhajir Makki

Najib Ali Choudhury (Bengali: নজিব আলী চৌধুরী) was a 19th-century Bengali Islamic scholar and teacher. He was notable for his founding of the Madinatul Uloom Bagbari, the first madrasa in the Barak Valley region.

== Early life and ancestry ==
Choudhury was born to a Bengali Muslim family in the village of Bagbari, near the town of Karimganj, then part of the Sylhet Sarkar of the Mughal Empire's Bengal Subah. His grandfather, Muhammad Naqi, was a local landowner, possessing taluq no. 70 of Egaroshati pargana. Accounts are contradictory regarding Choudhury's ancestral origins. His family had either migrated from Ghor Province in Afghanistan during the Mughal period, or were descended from Shah Umar Yemeni, one of the 360 companions of the Sufi saint Shah Jalal.

According to a handwritten manuscript by Choudhury's eldest son Abdul Hai Choudhury, the family was descended from Gawhar Khan, a nobleman from Badakhshan. Khan was said to have given up his wealth to his younger brother, and become a da'i in Hindustan, taking with him a handwritten ancestral mus'haf by Mir Husayn (dating to 1056 AH / 1647 CE), gilded by Muhammad Yusuf Ali. The emperor granted him jagirs near the village of Kaliganj, near present-day Karimganj district.

== Education and career ==
At some point, Choudhury became a disciple of Imdadullah Muhajir Makki, a Sufi scholar of the Chishti Order. He is said to have fought alongside Makki against the British in the Battle of Shamli, a part of the greater Indian Rebellion of 1857. Upon the failure of the revolt however, both men left the Indian subcontinent and migrated to Mecca. Choudhury was among the seventeen families that had emigrated from Sylhet, with other families being that of Syed Bakht Majumdar of Sylhet town, the Mians of Sonatia, the ancestors of Principal Habibur Rahman and the ancestors of Khan Bahadur Mahmud Ali (former Assam minister).

Tradition states that while in Mecca, Choudhury dreamt he was visited by the Islamic prophet Muhammad, who instructed him to go back to his homeland and preach Islam and provide Islamic education. Returning to his native village, in 1873, Choudhury established a madrasa in his own home, which received the name "Madinatul Uloom Bagbari Najibia Alia Madrasa" after its founder, shortened to Madinatul Uloom Bagbari. (Note: It is also known as the Darul Uloom Bagbari.) Modelled after the recently established Darul Uloom Deoband, it is considered to be the first true madrasa in the Greater Sylhet region, offering a standardised religious education in contrast to the informal institutions which had existed there previously. It came to play a very prominent role in producing Arabic language scholars in the Greater Sylhet region, a reputation it maintains to the present-day.

== Death and legacy ==
Choudhury himself acquired considerable renown, with tales arising of him having possessed spiritual powers. (Note: One such legend states that several decades after his death, Choudhury had materialised in person to save one of his sons from danger.) After his death, his grave became a shrine or Mazar, which is located in what is now Rauthgram, Karimganj district.

He was the father of Abdul Hai Choudhury and Gulam Rob Choudhury, distinguished Islamic scholars in their own right. His descendant, Abdul Bari Choudhury, was appointed as the principal of Madinatul Uloom Bagbari in 1948 after returning from his studies at Darul Uloom Deoband. Choudhury's great-grandson, Abdul Munim Choudhury, was made the first Shaykhul Hadith (Professor of Hadith) in the same year. Abdul Munim Choudhury was also a former Member of the Legislative Assembly for Karimganj South. Among Choudhury's other descendants are Jamil Ahmad Choudhury and Saeed Ahmad Choudhury, who are also teachers at Bagbari, as well as Abdul Ahad Choudhury, who taught at Karimganj High Madrasa.

== See also ==
- List of Deobandis
