= Krishna Das =

Krishna Das may refer to:

- Krishna Das (singer) (born Jeffrey Kagel 1947), American vocalist known for his performances of Hindu devotional music
- Krishna Das (archer) (born 1959), Indian archer and Arjuna Award winner, 1981
- Krishna Das (cricketer) (born 1990), Indian cricketer
- Krishna Das (politician), Bharatiya Janata Party politician from Assam
- Krishna Das Kabiraj (1496–?), 16th century Vaishnava hagiographer, author of Chaitanya Charitamrita
