= Madinatul Uloom Bagbari =

Coordinates: 24°47′16″N 92°25′37″E

- Other names: Darul Uloom Bagbari
- Type: Madrasa and Islamic university
- Established: 1 February 1873 (153 years ago)
- Founders: Najib Ali Choudhury
- Religious affiliation: Islam
- Principal: Maulana Abdul Mannan
- Location: Bagbari, Karimganj district, Assam, India

The Madinatul Uloom Bagbari Najibia Alia Madrasa (Arabic: المدرسة العالية النجيبية مدينة العلوم بباغباري) or Madinatul Uloom Bagbari (also known as the Darul Uloom Bagbari), is a madrasa located in Assam, India. It is the oldest Islamic educational institution in the South Assam region.

== History ==
It was founded in 1873 by the eminent Islamic scholar Najib Ali Choudhury. Tradition states that while living in Mecca, Choudhury was visited in a dream by the Islamic prophet Muhammad, who instructed him to return to his homeland and spread religious education. The madrasa was established in Choudhury's own home, in the village of Bagbari near Karimganj, and was officially named in his honour. It remained in this location for nearly a century, shifting to its present site in 1969 under the tenure of the then muhtamim (principal), Maulana Ashab Uddin.

Modelled after the famous Darul Uloom Deoband (which had been established only a few years earlier), the Madinatul Uloom Bagbari was the first true madrasa in the region, having offered a standardised education in contrast to the informal institutions which had existed previously. It initially provided courses up to "Shar-e-Jami", with the degree-level "Dawra-e-Hadith" course also being introduced after 1992. (Note: The names of the courses refer to the main texts then studied by students, with the latter also being known as the al-Sihah al-Sittah.)

== Reputation ==
Over the course of its history, the Madinatul Uloom Bagbari came to play a very prominent role in producing Arabic language scholars in the Greater Sylhet region, a reputation it maintains to the present-day. The madrasa currently contains an Arabic epigraph from 1509 that denotes the construction of a mosque in Surjyadas village by Sher Malik, an officer of the Sultan of Bengal Alauddin Husain Shah.

== Staff ==
Najib Ali Choudhury's descendant Abdul Bari Choudhury, was appointed as the principal of Madinatul Uloom Bagbari in 1948 after returning from his studies at Darul Uloom Deoband. In the same year, his great-grandson Abdul Munim Choudhury was made the first Shaykhul Hadith (Professor of Hadith). Among Choudhury's other descendants is Jamil Ahmad Choudhury, who is a teacher at the madrasa, as well as Saeed Ahmad Choudhury and Abdul Ahad Choudhury, who are members of the executive committee.
