= Aminur Rashid Choudhury =

Indian politician (born 1970)

Aminur Rashid Choudhury (born 1970) is an Indian politician from the northeastern state of Assam. He was a member of the Assam Legislative Assembly from Karimganj South Assembly constituency in Sribhumi district representing the Indian National Congress.

Choudhury is from Karimganj, Sribhumi district, Assam. He is the son of the Abdul Muqtadir Choudhury, a former three-time MLA from Karimganj South. He studied at Bengali High School, Paltan Bazar, Guwahati and passed his HSLC examinations conducted by SEBA in 1986. He runs his own business. He declared assets worth Rs.10 crore in his affidavit to the Election Commission of India.

== Career ==
Choudhury won his father's old constituency, the Karimganj South Assembly constituency representing the Indian National Congress in the 2021 Assam Legislative Assembly election. He polled 1,37,257 votes and defeated his nearest rival, Ekbal Hussain of the Asom Gana Parishad (AGP), by a margin of 86,632 votes.
