= Abdul Muqtadir Choudhury =

Indian politician

Member of the Assam Legislative Assembly
- In office 1996–2001
- Preceded by: Pranab Kumar Nath
- Succeeded by: Siddique Ahmed
- Constituency: Karimganj South
- In office 1978–1991
- Preceded by: Sudarsan Das
- Succeeded by: Pranab Kumar Nath
- Constituency: Karimganj South

Personal details
- Party: Indian National Congress

Abdul Muqtadir Choudhury (Bengali: আব্দুল মুক্তাদির চৌধুরী, Bengali pronunciation: [abːdul muktadir tʃoudʱuɾi]) is an Indian politician from Assam. He was elected to the Assam Legislative Assembly from Karimganj North in the 1972 and Karimganj South in the 1978, 1983, 1985 and 1996 Assam Legislative Assembly election as a member of the Indian National Congress.
