= Katigorah Assembly constituency =

Constituency of the Assam legislative assembly in India

Katigorah
- Constituency No. 116 for the Assam Legislative Assembly
- 116-Katigorah within Cachar district

Constituency details
- Country: India
- Region: Northeast India
- State: Assam
- Division: Barak Valley
- District: Cachar
- Lok Sabha constituency: Silchar
- Established: 1951
- Total electors: 214,527
- Reservation: None

Member of Legislative Assembly
- 16th Assam Legislative Assembly
- Incumbent Kamalakhya Dey Purkayastha
- Party: BJP
- Alliance: NDA
- Elected year: 2026
- Preceded by: Khalil Uddin Mazumder (INC)

Katigorah State assembly constituency is one of the 126 state legislative assembly constituencies in Assam, India. It is one of the seven assembly segments that constitute the Silchar Lok Sabha constituency. Since 2026, it has been represented by Kamalakhya Dey Purkayastha of the Bharatiya Janata Party.

Established in 1951, the constituency was redrawn during the 2023 delimitation exercise. The reconstituted constituency now includes Badarpur town and several other rural areas of Cachar district.

Most Successful parties from Katigorah Assembly Constituency Since 1952
1. INC (7 times) (43.8%)
2. BJP (5 times) (31.2%)
3. AIUDF (2 times) (12.5%)
4. IC(S) (1 time) (6.25%)
5. IND (1 time) (6.25%)

== Local self-governed segments ==
Katigorah Assembly constituency is composed of the following local self-governed segments:

- Badarpur Municipal Board
- Borkhola Dev. Block (Part)
  - Chandranathpur G.P
  - Borkhola G.P
  - Jarailtola G.P
  - Sonapur G.P
- Kalain Dev. Block (Part)
- Katigorah Dev. Block (Part)
- Salchapra Dev. Block (Part)
  - Salchapra G.P
- Algapur Dev. Block (Part)
  - Panchgram
  - Panchgram Township

== Members of the Legislative Assembly ==
Year	Name	Party
2026	Kamalakhya Dey Purkayastha	Bharatiya Janata Party
2021	Khalil Uddin Mazumder	Indian National Congress
2016	Amar Chand Jain	Bharatiya Janata Party
2011	Ataur Rahman Mazarbhuiya	All India United Democratic Front
2006	Ataur Rahman Mazarbhuiya	All India United Democratic Front
2001	Kali Ranjan Deb	Bharatiya Janata Party
1996	Kali Ranjan Deb	Bharatiya Janata Party
1991	Kali Ranjan Deb	Bharatiya Janata Party
1985	Abdul Hamid Mazumder	Indian Congress
1983	Nepal Chandra Das	Indian National Congress
1978	Abdul Kiyum Choudhury	Indian National Congress
1972	Abdul Hamid Mazumder	Indian National Congress
1967	A.K.N. Hoque	Indian National Congress
1962	Tarapada Bhattacharjee	Independent politician
1957	Hem Chandra Chakravarty	Indian National Congress
1952	Namwar Ali Barbhuiya	Indian National Congress

== Election results ==
=== 2026 ===
2026 Assam Legislative Assembly election: Katigorah
Party	Candidate	Votes	%	±%
BJP	Kamalakhya Dey Purkayastha	110,758	58.21	▲11.26
INC	Amar Chand Jain	73,078	38.41	▼12.81
AITC	Md. Fazlur Rahman Laskar	1,989	1.05	New entry
NOTA	None of the above	1,194	0.63	▼0.05
Margin of victory		37,680	19.80	
Turnout		1,90,257	88.69	▲2.68
BJP gain from INC		Swing		

== See also ==
- Silchar Assembly constituency
- List of constituencies of Assam Legislative Assembly
