= Government Boys' HS School Ground =

Cricket ground in Karimganj, India

- Karimganj (India)
- Interactive map of Government Boys' HS School Ground

Ground information
- Location: Karimganj, Assam
- Country: India
- Coordinates: 24°52′13″N 92°21′28″E
- Establishment: unknown (first recorded match 1993)
- Owner: Govt. Boys' HS School

Team information
Assam	(1993)
- As of 20 February 2014; Source: CricketArchive

A cricket ground located on the campus of the Government Boys' Higher Secondary School in Karimganj, Assam, and hosted two of the Assam cricket team's matches during the 1993–94 Indian domestic season.

== Playground ==
Karimganj, lying along the Bangladesh–India border, is the largest town in the district of the same name, and the ground is the only one in the district to have hosted first-class cricket matches. The school was established on 1884. However, it is unclear when exactly the ground was established, although it was presumably build and used by school teams long before it became part of the Indian state of Assam.

== Competitive sport ==
The first first-class match at the ground was a first-class match played between Assam and Tripura during the 1993–94 Ranji Trophy, with Javed Zaman's 11-wicket haul helping Assam prevail by an innings and 59 runs after three days play. The second and final top-class match played at the ground was a one-day encounter between the same two teams, won by the home team by four wickets despite Tripura's captain, Sourav Dasgupta, carrying his bat for 57 not out.

== Utilisation & local sports ==
Although Assam has not played any further recorded matches at the ground, a 2009 article in the Kolkata-based The Telegraph noted that, as well as hosting the school's team, the ground was also the base for the local Karimganj District Sports Association, and indeed was the only adequate playing field in the town. The association was, at that time, planning to establish a cricket coaching centre at the school premise.
