= Suklabaidya =

Suklabaidya (Bengali: শুক্লবৈদ্য) is a Bengali surname that is found among the Bengalis of India and Bangladesh. They belong to Baidya caste of Bengal. They are of physician community. But some Dhobis sub-caste also considered them as suklabaidya but they are not same. আলিম্বান gotra suklabaidya are baidya caste and belongs to physician group and are of general caste

== Notable people with the surname ==
- Lalit Mohan Suklabaidya (born 1942), Indian politician
- Parimal Suklabaidya (born 1958), Indian politician
