= RK Nagar =

RK Nagar may refer to:

== Places ==
- Ramakrishnanagar, a neighbourhood in Mysore, India
- Ramkrishna Nagar, Karimganj, a Township in Assam, India
- Radhakrishnan Nagar, an Assembly constituency in Chennai, India
- Radha Krishna Nagar, popularly known as Safilguda is a neighbourhood in Hyderabad, India

== Movies ==
- RK Nagar (film), a 2019 Tamil film

== Institutions ==
- Ramkrishna Nagar College, an educational institution in Karimganj, India
