= Sambhu Sing Mallah =

Indian politician

- শম্ভু সিং মাল্লাহ

Member of Assam Legislative Assembly
- In office 1996–2001
- Preceded by: Ramapayare Rabidas
- Succeeded by: Kripanath Mallah
- Constituency: Ratabari
- In office 2006–2011
- Preceded by: Kripanath Mallah
- Succeeded by: Kripanath Mallah
- Constituency: Ratabari

Personal details
- Political party: Bharatiya Janata Party (1996-2020); Indian National Congress (2020-present)

Sambhu Sing Mallah is an Indian National Congress politician from Assam. He has been elected in Assam Legislative Assembly election in 1996 and 2006 from Ratabari constituency as Bharatiya Janata Party candidate. In 2020, Mallah joins Congress and contested in 2021 Assam Assembly election from Ratabari constituency. He lost the election by a margin of 36221 votes to BJP's Bijoy Malakar.
