= Hoitorkha =

Village in Assam, India

Hoitorkha is a village, located in Karimganj district in the Indian state of Assam. Bengali and Meitei (Manipuri) are the official languages of this place.
