= Nihar Ranjan Laskar =

Indian politician

- নিহার রঞ্জন লস্কর
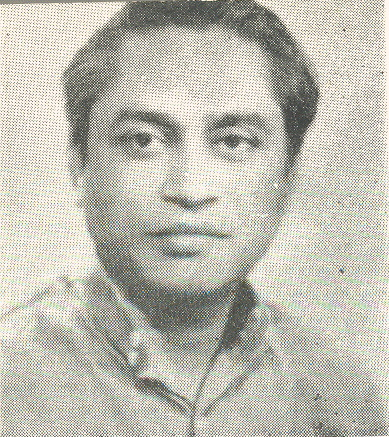

Union Minister of State for Industry
- In office 7 September 1984 – 31 October 1984; 12 November 1984 – 31 December 1984 Serving with S. B. P. Pattabhirama Rao
- Prime Minister: Indira Gandhi; Rajiv Gandhi
- Minister: Kotla Vijaya Bhaskara Reddy
- Succeeded by: Arif Mohammad Khan

Union Minister of State for Commerce and Supply
- In office 7 February 1984 – 7 September 1984
- Prime Minister: Indira Gandhi
- Minister: V. P. Singh
- Preceded by: Ram Dulari Sinha
- Succeeded by: S. M. Krishna

Union Minister of State for Home Affairs
- In office 15 January 1982 – 7 February 1984
- Prime Minister: Indira Gandhi
- Minister: Ramaswamy Venkataraman; Prakash Chandra Sethi
- Preceded by: Yogendra Makwana
- Succeeded by: Ram Dulari Sinha

Union Minister of State for Health and Family Welfare
- In office 14 January 1980 – 15 January 1982
- Prime Minister: Indira Gandhi
- Minister: B. Shankaranand
- Preceded by: Jagadambi Prasad Yadav
- Succeeded by: Mohsina Kidwai

Member of Parliament, Lok Sabha
- In office 1962 – 1984
- Succeeded by: Sudarsan Das
- Constituency: Karimganj

Personal details
- Born: 1 May 1932 Nizfulbari Village, Cachar District, Assam, British India
- Party: Indian National Congress
- Spouse: Panna Laskar

Nihar Ranjan Laskar (1 May 1932) was an Indian politician. He was elected to the Lok Sabha the lower house of Indian Parliament from Karimganj, Assam in 1962,1967,1971,1977 and 1980.He was member of the Indian National Congress. He served as Minister of State in the Ministry of Commerce in Fourth Indira Gandhi ministry from 7 February 1984 to 7 September 1984.

== Electoral history ==
Year	Constituency	Party	Votes	%	Opponent		Result	Margin
1962	Karimganj (SC)	INC	112,584	48.7%	Mukteswar Choudhury	Independent	Won	50,525
1967	Karimganj (SC)	INC	171,048	56.4%	Mukteswar Choudhury	Independent	Won	76,923
1971	Karimganj (SC)	INC	149,328	70.9%	Harinarayan Rabidas	CPI(M)	Won	121,746
1977	Karimganj (SC)	INC	127,454	53.2%	Lilamoy Das	BLD	Won	30,300
1980	Karimganj (SC)	INC	130,933	48.6%	Kamdeb Das	CPI(M)	Won	72,787
1984	Karimganj (SC)	INC	156,402	30.5%	Sudarsan Das	IC(S)	Lost	74,421
