= Kripanath Mallah =

Indian politician (born 1973)

- কৃপানাথ মাল্লাহ

Member of Parliament, Lok Sabha
- Incumbent
- Assumed office 23 May 2019
- Preceded by: Radheshyam Biswas
- Constituency: Karimganj

Deputy Speaker Assam Legislative Assembly
- In office 26 September 2018 – 23 May 2019
- Preceded by: Dilip Kumar Paul
- Succeeded by: Aminul Haque Laskar

Member of Assam Legislative Assembly
- In office 2003–2006
- Preceded by: Rathish Ranjan Choudhury
- Succeeded by: Sambhu Sing Mallah
- Constituency: Ratabari
- In office 2011–2015
- Preceded by: Sambhu Sing Mallah
- Constituency: Ratabari
- In office 2016–2019
- Succeeded by: Bijoy Malakar
- Constituency: Ratabari

Personal details
- Born: 15 October 1973 (age 52)
- Party: Bharatiya Janata Party
- Education: Karimganj College (B.Sc)

Kripanath Mallah (born 15 October 1973) is an Indian politician serving as the Member of Parliament in the 18th Lok Sabha from Karimganj constituency of Assam. He is a member of the Bharatiya Janata Party. He had been elected in Assam Legislative Assembly election in 2011 and 2016 from Ratabari constituency.

Previously, he was a member of Indian National Congress from Ratabari constituency in 2011.

The Gauhati High Court had issued summons to Kripanath Mallah in July 2024 for alleged booth capturing and other poll irregularities cases against him during the 2024 general election where he won by a margin of 18360 votes against Congress candidate Hafiz Rashid Ahmed Choudhury. Mallah got 5,45,093 votes while Choudhury secured 5,26,733 votes.

== Early life ==
Mallah was born on 15 October 1973 and hails from Bidyanagar village (Bidyanagar Tea Estate) in Karimganj district. He obtained a Bachelor of Science degree from Karimganj College, Assam University in 1997. He started his political journey by participating in Goan panchayat i. e. becoming the Goan panchayat president, then on climbing to the position of MLA, then on to the member of Lok sabha and parliament.
