= Ram Krishna Nagar Assembly constituency =

Constituency of the Assam legislative assembly in India

Coordinates: 24.59°N 92.40°E

Ram Krishna Nagar
- Constituency No. 126 for the Assam Legislative Assembly
- 126-Ram Krishna Nagar within Sribhumi district

Constituency details
- Country: India
- Region: Northeast India
- State: Assam
- Division: Barak Valley
- District: Sribhumi
- Lok Sabha constituency: Karimganj
- Established: 1962
- Total electors: 218,016
- Reservation: SC

Member of Legislative Assembly
- 16th Assam Legislative Assembly
- Incumbent Bijoy Malakar
- Party: BJP
- Alliance: NDA
- Elected year: 2026
- Preceded by: Kripanath Mallah (BJP)

Ram Krishna Nagar State assembly constituency is one of the 126 state legislative assembly constituencies in Assam, India. It is one of the six assembly segments that constitute the Karimganj Lok Sabha constituency. Since 2019, it has been represented by Bijoy Malakar of the Bharatiya Janata Party.

Originally established as Ratabari in 1962, the constituency was redrawn during the 2023 delimitation exercise and was renamed to Ram Krishna Nagar. The reconstituted constituency now includes Ramkrishna Nagar town, and many other rural areas of the Sribhumi district.

Most Successful parties from Ram Krishna Nagar Assembly Constituency Since 1962
1. BJP (7 times) (43.8%)
2. INC (7 times) (43.8%)
3. JP (1 time) (6.25%)
4. IND (1 time) (6.25%)

== Members of the Legislative Assembly ==
Election	Member	Political Party	Tenure
Ram Krishna Nagar
Reserved for Scheduled Castes
2026	Bijoy Malakar	Bharatiya Janata Party	2019-Incumbent
Ratabari
Reserved for Scheduled Castes
2021	Bijoy Malakar	Bharatiya Janata Party	
2019^	Bijoy Malakar	Bharatiya Janata Party	
2016	Kripanath Mallah	Bharatiya Janata Party	2011-19
2011	Kripanath Mallah	Indian National Congress	2011-19
2006	Sambhu Sing Mallah	Bharatiya Janata Party	2006-11
2003^	Kripanath Mallah	Indian National Congress	2003-06
2001	Rathish Ranjan Choudhury	Independent	2001-03
1996	Sambhu Sing Mallah	Bharatiya Janata Party	1996-01
1991	Ramapayare Rabidas	Bharatiya Janata Party	1991-96
1985	Kumari Rabidas	Indian National Congress	1985-91
1983	Subal Chandra Das	Indian National Congress	1983-85
1978	Lilamoy Das	Janata Party	1978-83
Unreserved
1972	Suranjan Nandy	Indian National Congress	1972-78
1967	B. Upadhyay	Indian National Congress	1967-72
1962	Baidyanath Mookerjee	Indian National Congress	1962-67

- ^ bye-election

== Election results ==
=== 2026 ===
2026 Assam Legislative Assembly election: Ram Krishna Nagar
Party	Candidate	Votes	%	±%
BJP	Bijoy Malakar	134,013	70.70	▲8.78
INC	Suruchi Roy	50,248	26.51	▼8.93
AIUDF	Anup Kumar Das Talukdar	1,302	0.69	New entry
NOTA	None of the above	1,247	0.66	▼0.22
Margin of victory		83,765	44.19	▲17.48
Turnout		1,89,546	86.94	▲8.33
BJP hold		Swing		

=== 2021 ===
2021 Assam Legislative Assembly election: Ratabari
Party	Candidate	Votes	%	±%
BJP	Bijoy Malakar	84,711	61.92	▲2.77
INC	Sambhu Sing Mallah	48,490	35.44	▼2.97
NOTA	None of the above	1,200	0.88	▼0.17
Margin of victory		36,221	26.71	▲5.97
Turnout		135,611	78.61	▲4.24
BJP hold		Swing		

=== 2019 ===
2019 Assam Legislative Assembly By-election: Ratabari
Party	Candidate	Votes	%	±%
BJP	Bijoy Malakar	68,455	59.15	▲11.07
INC	Keshab Prasad Rajak	44,454	38.41	▲12.18
NOTA	None of the above	1,217	1.05	▲0.26
Margin of victory		24,001	20.74	▼1.11
Turnout		1,15,730	74.37	▼1.55
BJP hold		Swing		

=== 2016 ===
2016 Assam Legislative Assembly election: Ratabari
Party	Candidate	Votes	%	±%
BJP	Kripanath Mallah	53,975	48.08	▲23.24
INC	Akhil Ranjan Talukdar	29,449	26.23	▼13.59
AIUDF	Rajib Biswas	23,926	21.31	▲0.22
NOTA	None of the above	889	0.79	New entry
Margin of victory		24,526	21.85	
Turnout		1,12,608	75.92	▲14.78
BJP gain from INC		Swing		

== See also ==
- List of constituencies of Assam Legislative Assembly
- Ramkrishna Nagar
