= Karimganj cemetery =

Public cemetery to Gaya, Bihar, India

Karimganj Cemetery
- करीमगंज कब्रिस्तान (Hindi) کریم گنج قبرستان (Urdu)
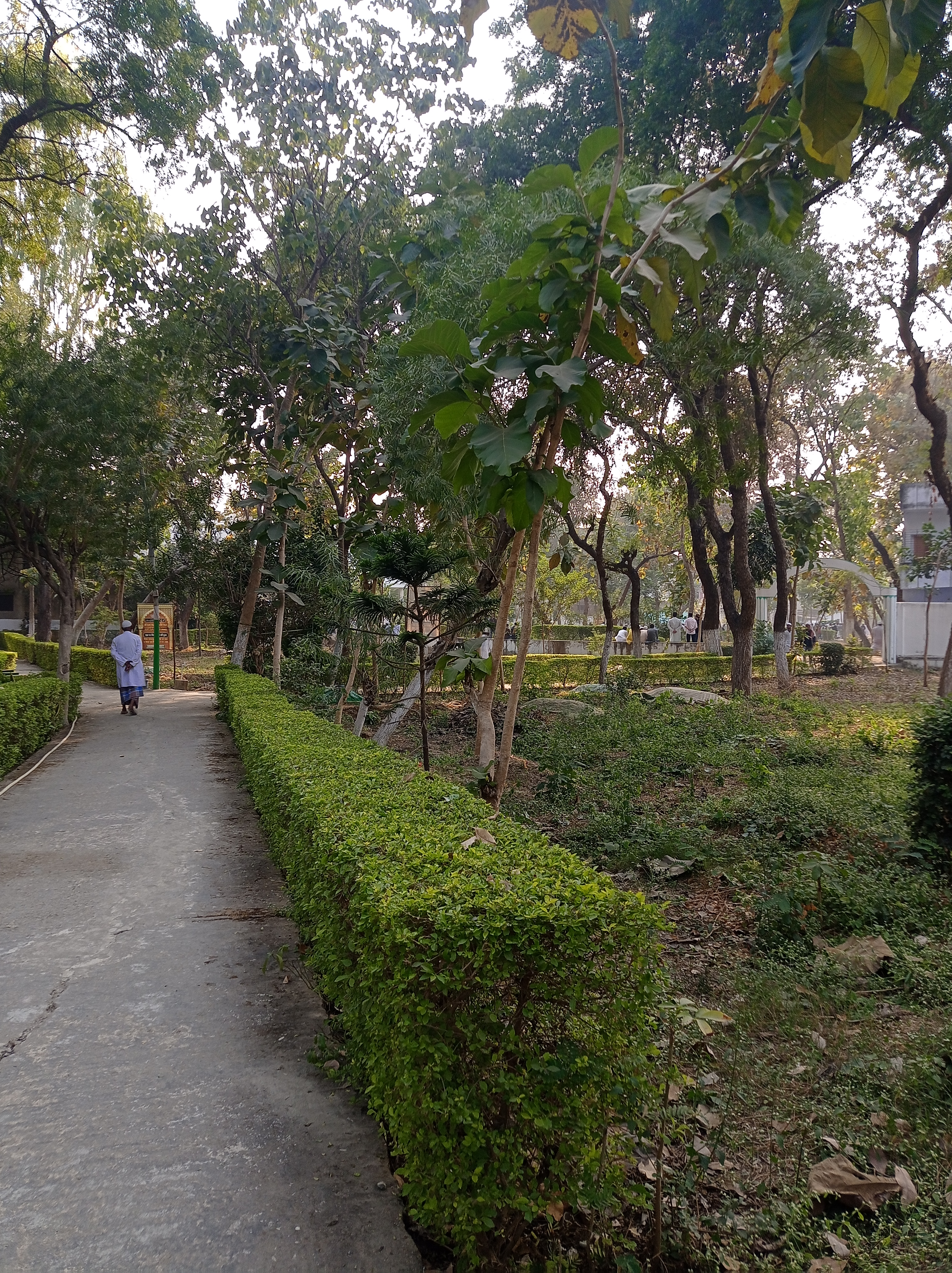
- Interactive map of Karimganj Cemetery

Details
- Location: Old Karimganj, Gaya, Bihar, India
- Country: India
- Coordinates: 24°47′47″N 84°59′22″E
- Type: Public
- Owned by: Gaya Nagar Nigam

Karimganj Kabristan (Hindi: करीमगंज कब्रिस्तान; Urdu: کریم گنج قبرستان), or Karimganj Cemetery is a Muslim burial ground in Old Karimganj, Gaya, Bihar, India. Administered by Gaya Nagar Nigam and managed by the Karimganj Kabristan Committee, it shares proximity with New Karimganj and Aliganj neighborhoods and is bordered by the Gaya–Kiul railway line to the north. It made headlines in October 2021 for hosting the COVID-19 vaccination camps during the second wave of the pandemic.
