= Aziz Ahmed Khan (politician) =

Indian politician (born 1978)

MLA of Karimganj South Vidhan Sabha constituency
- In office 2016–2021
- Preceded by: Siddique Ahmed
- Succeeded by: Siddique Ahmed

Personal details
- Born: 1978 (age 47–48) Farampasha, Karimganj
- Party: All India United Democratic Front (2016-2021); Asom Gana Parishad (2021-2025) Indian National Congress (2025-present)

Aziz Ahmed Khan (Bengali: আজিজ আহমেদ খাঁ; born 1978) is an Indian politician from Assam. In 2016, he was elected as MLA of Karimganj South Vidhan Sabha constituency in Assam Legislative Assembly. He is an All India United Democratic Front politician. Just before the 2021 Assembly election, he resigned from the AIUDF and joined the Asom Gana Parishad, but lost to Siddique Ahmed from Indian National Congress in the election.

== Biography ==
Aziz Ahmed Khan was born in 1978, to a Bengali Muslim family from Farampasha in Karimganj. His father is Mozir Uddin Ahmed Khan.
