= Ataur Rahman Mazarbhuiya =

Indian politician

Ataur Rahman Mazarbhuiya is an Indian National Congress politician from Assam. He was elected to the Assam Legislative Assembly in the 2006 and 2011 election from Katigorah constituency as a candidate of an All India United Democratic Front. He joined Indian National Congress before the assembly election in 2016 and contested from that party. He is also a religious leader, a frontline leader of Nadwatut Tameer (an Islamic organization). He is also the editor of Monthly Neda-e-Deen.
