= Khalil Uddin Mazumder =

Indian politician

Khalil Uddin Mazumder is an Indian politician from Assam. He was elected to the Assam Legislative Assembly from Katigorah in the 2021 Assam Legislative Assembly election as a member of the Indian National Congress.
