= Patharkandi Assembly constituency =

Constituency of the Assam legislative assembly in India

Patharkandi
- Constituency No. 125 for the Assam Legislative Assembly
- 125-Patharkandi within Sribhumi district

Constituency details
- Country: India
- Region: Northeast India
- State: Assam
- Division: Barak Valley
- District: Sribhumi
- Lok Sabha constituency: Karimganj
- Established: 1951
- Total electors: 179,026
- Reservation: None

Member of Legislative Assembly
- 16th Assam Legislative Assembly
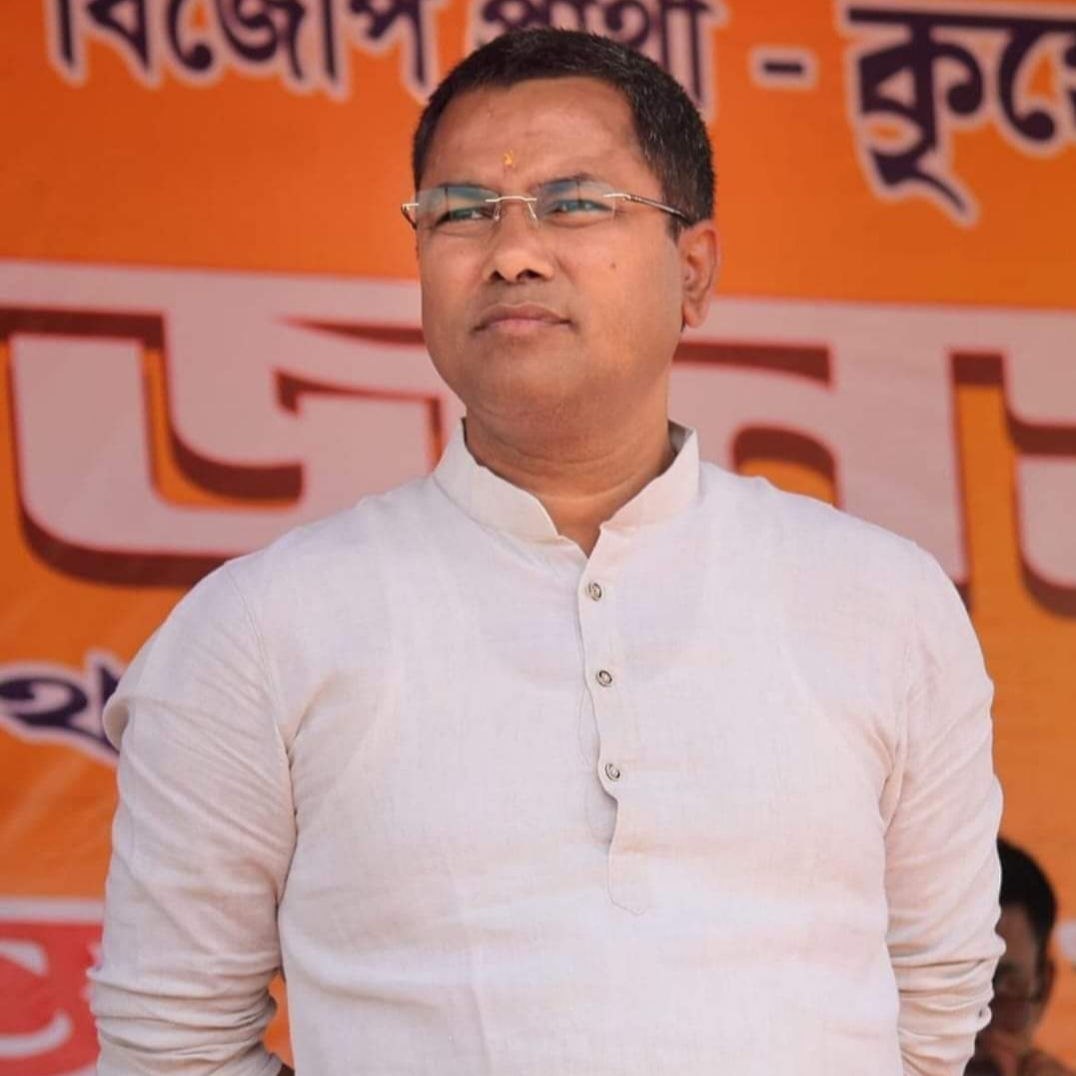
- Incumbent Krishnendu Paul
- Party: BJP
- Alliance: NDA
- Elected year: 2026
- Preceded by: Monilal Gowala (INC)

Patharkandi State assembly constituency is one of the 126 state legislative assembly constituencies in Assam, India. It is one of the six assembly segments that constitute the Karimganj Lok Sabha constituency. Since 2016, it has been represented by Krishnendu Paul of the Bharatiya Janata Party.

Established in 1951, the constituency was redrawn during the 2023 delimitation exercise. It is now an all-rural constituency comprising several rural areas of the Sribhumi district.

Most Successful parties from Patharkandi Assembly Constituency Since 1952
1. BJP (6 times) (37.5%)
2. INC (5 times) (31.2%)
3. IND (4 times) (25.0%)
4. CPI (1 time) (6.25%)

== Members of the Legislative Assembly ==
Election	Member	Political Party	Tenure
2026	Krishnendu Paul	Bharatiya Janata Party	2016-Incumbent
2021	Krishnendu Paul	Bharatiya Janata Party	2016-Incumbent
2016	Krishnendu Paul	Bharatiya Janata Party	2016-Incumbent
2011	Monilal Gowala	Indian National Congress	2011-16
2006	Kartik Sena Sinha	Bharatiya Janata Party	2006-11
2001	Monilal Gowala	Indian National Congress	2001-06
1996	Shukhendu Shekhar Dutta	Bharatiya Janata Party	1996-01
1991	Madhusudhan Tiwari	Bharatiya Janata Party	1991-96
1985	Monilal Gowala	Indian National Congress	1985-91
1983	Moin Uddin	Independent	1983-85
1978	Mohammed Fokhrul Islam	Independent	1978-83
1972	Biswanath Upadhyaya	Indian National Congress	1972-78
1967	Motilal Kanoo	Independent	1967-72
1962	Ramdeb Malah	Indian National Congress	1962-67
1957	Biswanath Upadhyaya	Independent	1957-62
1952	Gopesh Namasudra	Communist Party of India	1952-57

== Election Results ==
=== 2026 ===
2026 Assam Legislative Assembly election: Patharkandi
Party	Candidate	Votes	%	±%
BJP	Krishnendu Paul	98,101	64.35	▲14.69
INC	Kartik Sena Sinha	51,337	33.67	▼13.03
NOTA	None of the above	1,005	0.66	▼0.19
Margin of victory		46,764	30.67	▲27.68
Turnout		1,52,455	85.16	▲6.65
BJP hold		Swing		

=== 2021 ===
2021 Assam Legislative Assembly election : Patharkandi
Party	Candidate	Votes	%	±%
BJP	Krishnendu Paul	74,846	49.66	▲11.73
INC	Sachin Sahoo	70,379	46.70	▲20.58
NOTA	None of the above	1,288	0.85	▲0.02
Margin of victory		4,467	2.99	▼4.56
Turnout		149,419	78.51	▼0.68
BJP hold		Swing		

=== 2016 ===
2016 Assam Legislative Assembly election: Patharkandi
Party	Candidate	Votes	%	±%
BJP	Krishnendu Paul	46,544	37.93	▲29.08
AIUDF	Dr. Debendra Kumar Sinha	37,276	30.38	▼8.85
INC	Moni Lal Gowala	32,048	26.12	▼16.14
NOTA	None of the above	1,030	0.83	New entry
Margin of victory		9,268	7.55	
Turnout		1,22,694	79.19	▲3.18
BJP gain from INC		Swing		

== See also ==
- Patharkandi
- List of constituencies of the Assam Legislative Assembly
