= Abdul Munim Choudhury =

Indian politician

Moulvi Abdul Munim Choudhury
- আব্দুল মুনিম চৌধুরী

Member of Assam Legislative Assembly
- In office 1957–1967
- Preceded by: Moulvi M. Ali
- Succeeded by: Prafulla Choudhury
- Constituency: Karimganj South

Personal details
- Born: Bagbari, Karimganj, Sylhet district (now Assam, India)
- Party: Indian National Congress
- Relatives: Najib Ali Choudhury (great-grandfather)

Religious life
- Religion: Islam
- Denomination: Sunni
- Jurisprudence: Hanafi
- Movement: Deobandi

Moulvi Abdul Munim Choudhury (Bengali: আব্দুল মুনিম চৌধুরী) was an Indian Bengali politician and Islamic scholar. He twice served as member of the Assam Legislative Assembly for the Karimganj South constituency.

== Early life and family ==
Choudhury was born into a scholarly Bengali Muslim family of Choudhuries in the village of Bagbari in Karimganj (then under Sylhet district). His ancestors had either migrated from Ghor Province in Afghanistan during the Mughal period, or were descended from Shah Umar Yemeni, one of the 360 companions of the Sufi saint Shah Jalal. Choudhury's great-grandfather, Najib Ali Choudhury, was an Islamic scholar who had founded Madinatul Uloom Bagbari, the first modern madrasa in the Sylhet region, and his grandfather Ghulam Rab Choudhury was also an Islamic scholar. Choudhury was educated in the Islamic tradition and received the title of Moulvi.

According to a handwritten manuscript by his grandfather's elder brother Abdul Hai Choudhury, the family was descended from Gawhar Khan, a nobleman from Badakhshan. Khan was said to have given up his wealth to his younger brother, and become a da'i in Hindustan, taking with him a handwritten ancestral mus'haf by Mir Husayn (dating to 1056 AH / 1647 CE), gilded by Muhammad Yusuf Ali. The emperor granted him jagirs near the village of Kaliganj, near present-day Karimganj district.

== Career ==
In 1948, Choudhury was appointed the first Shaykhul Hadith (Professor of Hadith) at the Madinatul Uloom Bagbari madrasa.

He was associated with the Indian National Congress. He won a seat in the Karimganj South constituency after participating in the 1962 Assam Legislative Assembly election.

Political offices
| Preceded by Moulvi M. Ali | MLA for Karimganj South; 1962–1967 | Succeeded by Prafulla Choudhury |
