= Amar Chand Jain =

Indian politician

Amar Chand Jain is a Bharatiya Janata Party politician from Assam, India. He has been elected in Assam Legislative Assembly election in 2016 from Katigorah constituency.
