= Sadarashi =

Village in Assam, India

Sadarashi (Bengali: সাদারাশী) is a village in Karimganj district of Assam state of India. Bengali and Meitei (Manipuri) are the official languages of this place.
