= Radheshyam Biswas =

Indian politician

Member of Parliament, Lok Sabha
- In office 16 May 2014 – 23 May 2019
- Preceded by: Lalit Mohan Suklabaidya
- Constituency: Karimganj

Personal details
- Born: 16 May 1954 (age 71) Kamargram, Karimganj, Assam
- Party: All India Trinamool Congress (since 2024)
- Other political affiliations: All India United Democratic Front (2010-2024)
- Spouse: Namita Biswas
- Children: 3

Radheshyam Biswas is a Bengali Indian politician and a member of parliament to the 16th Lok Sabha from Karimganj (Lok Sabha constituency), Assam. He won the 2014 Indian general election as an All India United Democratic Front candidate. He lost the 2019 Indian general election to a BJP candidate.
