= Old Karimganj =

Old Karimganj पुरानी करीमगंज (Hindi) پرانی کریم گنج (Urdu)
- Neighbourhood
- Location within Bihar Location within India
- Coordinates: 24°47′39″N 84°59′28″E
- Country: India
- State: Bihar
- City: Gaya

Government
  - Body: Gaya Nagar Nigam

Language
  - Official: Hindi, Urdu
  - Spoken: Magadhi, Hindi, Urdu
- Time zone: UTC+5:30
- PIN: 823001

Old Karimganj (Hindi: पुरानी करीमगंज, IAST: Purānī Karīmagaṃja; Urdu: پرانی کریم گنج, romanized: Purānī Karīmganj), also spelled as Old Kareemganj or simply Karimganj, is a residential neighborhood under the Civil Lines thana zone of Gaya, Bihar, India, inhabited mostly by Muslims. Forming the eastern wing of the larger Karimganj neighborhood, it shares its proximity with New Karimganj neighborhood to the west and Jagdeo Nagar to the north. The locality is popular for serving the Karimganj Cemetery and infamous for its congested alleyways and poor drainage infrastructure.

== Etymology ==
Old Karimganj is the literal translation of Hindi-Urdu Purānī Karīmganj. The Hindi-Urdu purānī (Hindi: पुरानी; Urdu: پرانی) literally means "old" meanwhile the Arabic word karīm (Arabic: كَرِيم) translates to "kind" or "noble" whereas the Middle Persian word ganj (Persian: گنج) means "treasured place" or "neighborhood".

== Notable landmarks ==
- Old Karimganj Cemetery
- Nazareth Academy
