= Shukhendu Shekhar Dutta =

Indian politician

Shukhendu Shekhar Dutta is a Bharatiya Janata Party politician from Assam. He was elected to the Assam Legislative Assembly in 1996 from Patharkandi constituency.
