= Madhusudhan Tiwari =

Indian politician

Madhusudhan Tiwari was a Bharatiya Janata Party politician from Assam, India. He was elected to the Assam Legislative Assembly in 1991 from Patharkandi constituency.
