= Kamalakhya Dey Purkayastha =

Indian politician

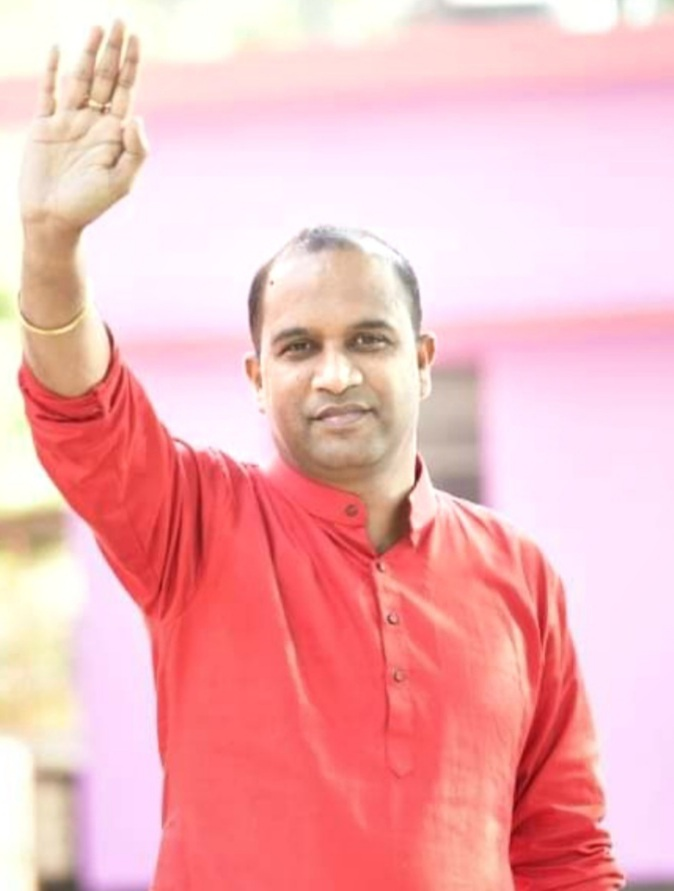

Member of the Assam Legislative Assembly
- Incumbent
- Assumed office May 2026
- Preceded by: Khalil Uddin Mazumder
- Constituency: Katigorah Assembly constituency

Personal details
- Born: 21 September 1977 (age 49) Assam, India
- Party: Indian National Congress (1996–2024), BJP (2024-Present)
- Children: 1 (Son)
- Education: Karimganj College
- Nickname: Raju

Kamalakhya Dey Purkayastha is an Indian politician from Assam currently affiliated with the Bharatiya Janata Party (BJP). He is a former member of the Indian National Congress (INC), where he served as the deputy chief whip of Congress Legislative Party in Assam. He was elected as MLA of Karimganj North (Vidhan Sabha constituency) for the first time in 2011, defeating the four-time BJP MLA Mission Ranjan Das, ending the streak of a lack of success for Congress in North Karimganj after 25 years. He was re elected in 2016. In 2021, he won for the third consecutive time. He again elected as the MLA from Katigorah Assembly constituency under banner of Bharatiya Janata Party in 2026 Assam Legislative Assembly election.

== Early life ==
He started his political career as a student leader of NSUI in 1996. A year later, he was elected as the general secretary of Karimganj College Students Union and vice president of the union the following year.

== Career ==
On 24 July 2021, he was appointed the working president of Assam Pradesh Congress Committee, making him the first Congress leader from Barak Valley to be appointed to this post. He resigned as working president of Assam Pradesh Congress Committee on 14 February 2024 and extended his support to the Government of Assam led by Himanta Biswa Sarma.
