= Mission Ranjan Das =

Indian politician from Assam

Member of Parliament, Rajya Sabha
- In office 20 August 2024 – 14 June 2025 (Bye-election)
- Preceded by: Kamakhya Prasad Tasa
- Succeeded by: Kanad Purkayastha
- Constituency: Assam

Assam Legislative Assembly
- In office 2000–2011
- Succeeded by: Kamalakhya Dey Purkayastha
- Constituency: Karimganj North Assembly constituency

Personal details
- Born: Mission Ranjan Das; 1 May 1960 (age 65) Karimganj, Assam
- Party: Bharatiya Janata Party

Mission Ranjan Das is a Bharatiya Janata Party politician from Assam, India. He has been elected in Assam Legislative Assembly election in 1991, 2000, 2001 and 2006 from Karimganj North constituency. He was also the chairman of Assam State Transport Corporation.

Das was elected unopposed to the Rajya Sabha in the 2024 by-election.

== Electoral performance ==
Assam Legislative Assembly
Year	Party	Constituency	Result	Votes
1991	Bharatiya Janata Party	Karimganj North	Won	34,288
1996	Bharatiya Janata Party	Karimganj North	Lost	1st Runner-up
1996	Bharatiya Janata Party	Karimganj North	Lost	35,561
2000 By-election	Bharatiya Janata Party	Karimganj North	Won	34,851
2001	Bharatiya Janata Party	Karimganj North	Won	45,429
2006	Bharatiya Janata Party	Karimganj North	Won	32,666
2011	Bharatiya Janata Party	Karimganj North	Lost	1st Runner-up
2011	Bharatiya Janata Party	Karimganj North	Lost	27,257
2016	Bharatiya Janata Party	Karimganj North	Lost	1st Runner-up
2016	Bharatiya Janata Party	Karimganj North	Lost	44,821

Rajya Sabha
Year	Party	State	Result	Votes
2024 By-election	Bharatiya Janata Party	Assam	Won	Unopposed
