= Ramkrishna Nagar, Karimganj =

Coordinates: 24.582731°N 92.453357°E

Ramkrishna Nagar R.K. Nagar
- Municipality Town
- Interactive map of Ramkrishna Nagar
- Country: India
- Civil Subdivision State Assam: Assam
- District: Karimganj
- Established: town declared in 2015

Government
  - Type: Town development board
  - Body: Local Magistrate

Area
  - Total: 20 km^{2} (7.7 sq mi)

Population (2011)
  - Total: 20,000
  - Density: 1,000/km^{2} (2,600/sq mi)

Languages
  - Official: Bengali, Meitei
- Time zone: UTC+5:30 (IST)
- PIN: 788166
- Vehicle registration: AS-10
- Nearest city: Hailakandi
- Literacy: 92%
- Lok Sabha constituency: Karimganj
- Vidhan Sabha constituency: Ramkrishna Nagar

Ramkrishna Nagar (Bengali pronunciation: [ramkriʃno nɔgor]), often called RK Nagar for short, is a municipality town situated in Karimganj district, Assam India. This town is under jurisdiction of District Headquarter Karimganj.

== History ==
Ramkrishna Nagar was established to give people a home who came from East Bengal during the Partition of India.

== Distance From Local towns ==
There is a small town under this called Kadamtala about 2 km from Ramkrishna Nagar. Access to this place is from Hailakandi, Silchar, and other places by bus route is available. It is possible to get a train from Anipur Railway Station, approximately 5 km away from the main town.

== Demographics ==
Bengali is the official language and Meitei is the Associate official language of this place.

The majority of the population of Ramkrishna Nagar are Bengali-speaking Hindus.

== Geography ==
The place is mostly covered by small altitude hills. There are also some green tea gardens near the town. A hanging bridge connected Ramkrishna Nagar to the Ratabari area; the bridge collapsed in October 2021. Due to the proximity to Mizoram, on the border with Myanmar, the township has seen a number of arrests of drug-traffickers.

== Education ==
The only institution for higher education is Ramkrishna Nagar College which opened in 1964. Now it offers courses in science and humanities. Ramakrishna Nagar has a number of government, as well as private schools, at both primary as well as secondary level. Schools in the area include Ramkrishna Vidyapith H.S School, Kadamtala High School, Girls High School, G.C Paul Memorial Academy, Dreamland High School, Ideal home English Medium High School, Saraswati Vidyamandir, Pranabananda Vidyamandir, Jawahar Navodaya Vidyalaya, etc. Recently Ramkrishna Nagar junior College was opened which is privately funded institute and the stream of commerce was introduced in 10+2 level in Ramkrishna Nagar for the first time. For degree courses there is one college which is Ramkrishna Nagar college which provides degree courses in science and humanities which is affiliated to Assam university which provides pass and honours courses in various stream. There is also one private college named G.C Paul College of Education situated 3–4 km away from main town which provides B.Ed., D.el.ed degree courses in Arts. This institution along with G.C Paul Memorial Academy (school) was founded by former Ramkrishna Nagar College Principal, Mr. K.R Ranjan Paul. The Karimganj Medical College and Hospital was inaugurated on 1 March 2024 by CM Himanta Biswa Sarma in Ramkrishna Nagar, Kadamtala.

== Local events and festivals ==
Viking Fair and Book fairs are held regularly at R.K Nagar. Every year Durga Puja is celebrated with large gatherings of people. On the occasion of Independence Day and Republic Day, a parade is performed by the 4th Assam NCC Unit cadets of Ramkrishna Nagar College along with the police officers and selected students of the local schools in front of the Circle Officer and Officer-in-charge of Police.

== Sport ==
Inter-state Football championships are famous in Ramkrishna Nagar. Teams from Tripura, Bangladesh, Shillong also participate in the events. Inter-school football matches and local matches are also played on regular basis. Red ball cricket is also popular in Ramkrishna Nagar. Nowadays, Women football matches are also played. All these matches are played in Netaji Baag, Ramkrishna Nagar.

== Amenities ==
It has a basic primary health care center with ambulances. The area also has its own police station which was established in 1994 and a fire brigade station.

== See also ==
- Ratabari Vidhan Sabha
