= Siddique Ahmed (Indian politician) =

Indian politician (1962–2026)

Siddeque Ahmed
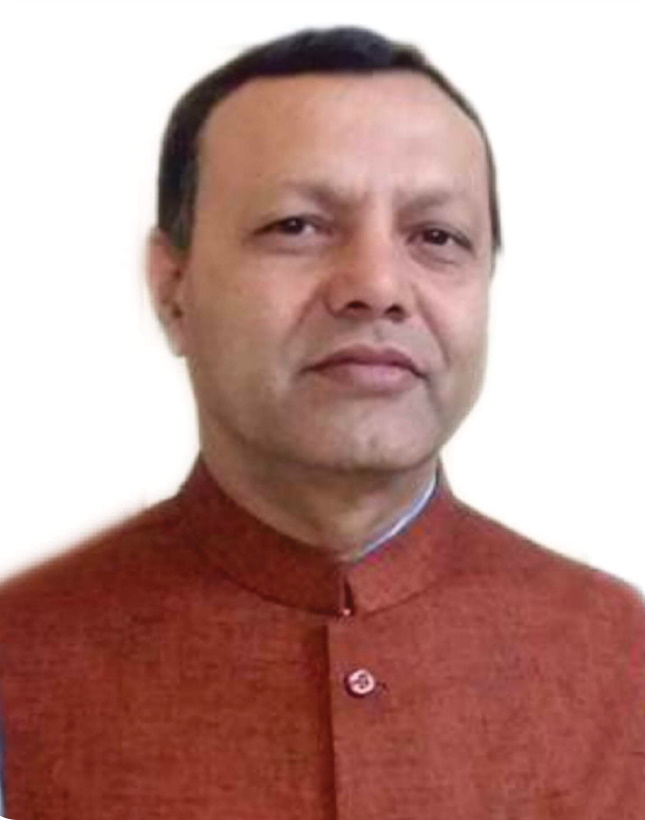
- Official portrait

Cabinet Minister, Government of Assam
- In office 26 January 2015 – 24 May 2016
- Chief Minister: Tarun Gogoi
- Portfolios: Industries and Commerce; Power; Public Enterprises
- Preceded by: Tarun Gogoi

Minister of State (Independent Charge), Government of Assam
- In office 30 May 2011 – 23 July 2014
- Chief Minister: Tarun Gogoi
- Portfolios: Co-operation; Border Areas Development

Member, Assam Legislative Assembly
- In office 2 May 2021 – 4 May 2026
- Preceded by: Aziz Ahmed Khan
- Succeeded by: Aminur Rashid Choudhury
- Constituency: Karimganj South
- In office 2001–2016
- Preceded by: Abdul Muqtadir Choudhury
- Succeeded by: Aziz Ahmed Khan

Personal details
- Born: 1 October 1962
- Died: 13 September 2026 (aged 63) Baroigram, Sribhumi district, Assam, India
- Party: Indian National Congress
- Other political affiliations: Samata Party
- Occupation: Politician

Siddeque Ahmed (1 October 1962 – 13 September 2026) was an Indian National Congress politician from Assam. He was the MLA of the Assam Legislative Assembly from Karimganj South constituency.

Ahmed was married to Anima Begum and had four children. He died from cancer at his residence in Baroigram, on 13 September 2026, at the age of 63.
