= Ketaki Prasad Dutta =

Indian politician (died 2019)

MLA of Karimganj North Vidhan Sabha Constituency
- In office 1983–1985
- Preceded by: Nishith Ranjan Das
- Succeeded by: Sirajul Hoque Choudhury

Personal details
- Born: 1944/45
- Died: 8 May 2019
- Party: Indian National Congress

Ketaki Prasad Dutta was an Indian politician belonging to Indian National Congress. He was elected as MLA of Karimganj North Vidhan Sabha Constituency in Assam Legislative Assembly in 1983. He died on 8 May 2019 at the age of 74. He was also the President of District Sports Association, Karimganj.
