= New Karimganj =

New Karimganj न्यू करीमगंज (Hindi) نیو کریم گنج (Urdu)
- Neighbourhood
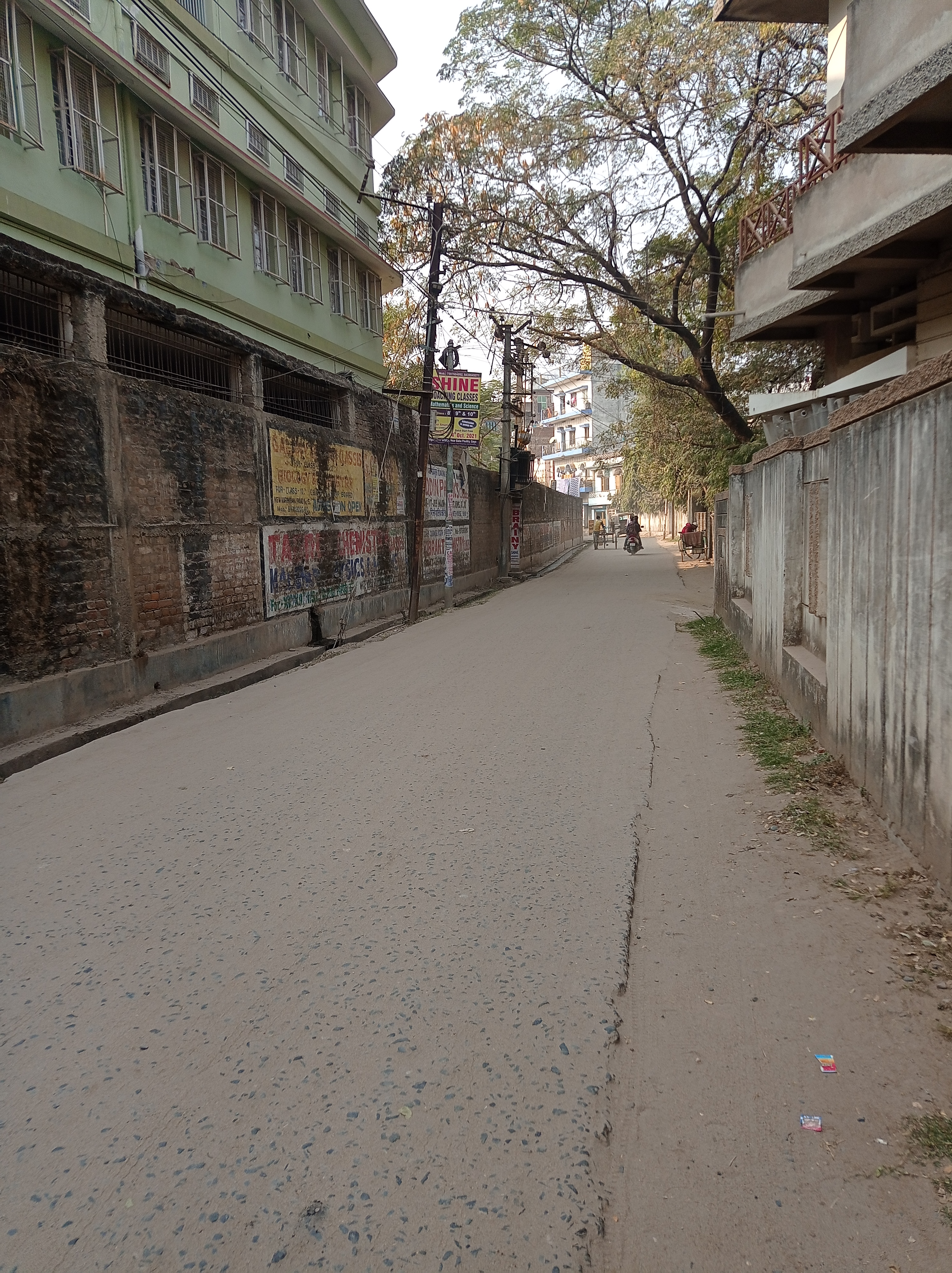

- Location within Bihar Location within India
- Coordinates: 24°47′41″N 84°59′26″E
- Country: India
- State: Bihar
- City: Gaya

Government
  - Body: Gaya Nagar Nigam

Language
  - Official: Hindi, Urdu
  - Spoken: Magadhi, Hindi, Urdu
- Time zone: UTC+5:30
- PIN: 823001

New Karimganj (Hindi: न्यू करीमगंज, IAST: Nyū Karīmagaṃja; Urdu: نیو کریم گنج, romanized: Niū Karīmganj), also spelled as New Kareemganj or simply Karimganj, is a residential neighborhood under the Civil Lines thana zone of Gaya, Bihar, India, inhabited mostly by Muslims. Forming the western wing of the larger Karimganj neighborhood, it shares its proximity with Old Karimganj neighborhood to the east and Jagdeo Nagar to the north. The locality is popular for serving the Creane Memorial High School and is infamous for its congested alleyways.

== Notable landmarks ==
- Creane Memorial High School

== Notable people ==
- Hussain Ul Haque
- Dr. Syed Ahmad Qadri (Indian poet and writer)
