= Sudarsan Das =

Indian politician

Member of Parliament, Lok Sabha
- In office 1985–1989
- Preceded by: Nihar Ranjan Laskar
- Succeeded by: Dwarka Nath Das
- Constituency: Karimganj

Personal details
- Party: Indian Congress (Socialist)
- Occupation: Politician

Sudarsan Das is an Indian politician. He was elected to the Lok Sabha the lower house of Indian Parliament from Karimganj, Assam as an Indian Congress (Socialist).
