= Karimganj South Assembly constituency =

Constituency of the Assam legislative assembly in India

Karimganj South
- Constituency No. 124 for the Assam Legislative Assembly

Constituency details
- Country: India
- Region: Northeast India
- State: Assam
- District: Sribhumi
- Lok Sabha constituency: Karimganj
- Established: 1951
- Reservation: None

Karimganj South Assembly constituency is one of the 126 constituencies of the Legislative Assembly of Assam state in northeastern India.

Karimganj South (constituency number 124) is one of the 4 constituencies located in Sribhumi district. Karimganj North is part of Karimganj Lok Sabha constituency.

== Members of Legislative Assembly ==
Year	Winner	Party
1957	Abdul Munim Choudhury	Indian National Congress
1962	Abdul Munim Choudhury	Indian National Congress
1967	P. Choudhury	Indian National Congress
1972	Sudarsan Das	Indian National Congress
1978	Abdul Muqtadir Choudhury	Indian National Congress
1983	Abdul Muqtadir Choudhury	Indian National Congress
1985	Abdul Muqtadir Choudhury	Indian National Congress
1996	Abdul Muqtadir Choudhury	Indian National Congress
1991	Pranab Kumar Nath	Bharatiya Janata Party
2001	Siddique Ahmed	Samata Party
2006	Siddique Ahmed	Independent politician
2011	Siddique Ahmed	Indian National Congress
2016	Aziz Ahmed Khan	All India United Democratic Front
2021	Siddique Ahmed	Indian National Congress
2026	Aminur Rashid Choudhury	Indian National Congress

== Election results ==
=== 2026 ===
2026 Assam Legislative Assembly election: Karimganj South
Party	Candidate	Votes	%	±%
INC	Aminur Rashid Choudhury	137,257	57.78	
AGP	Ekbal Hussain	50,625	21.31	
AITC	Aziz Ahmed Khan	40,016	16.85	
AIUDF	Shihabuddin	2,543	1.07	
NOTA	None of the above	1,631	0.69	
Margin of victory		86,632	36.47	
Turnout		2,37,543		
INC hold		Swing		

=== 2016 ===
2016 Assam Legislative Assembly election: Karimganj South
Party	Candidate	Votes	%	±%
AIUDF	Aziz Ahmed Khan	58,060	45.20	
INC	Siddique Ahmed	53,644	41.76	
BJP	Sipra Goon	11,861	9.23	
NOTA	None of the above	173	0.13	
Majority		4,416	3.44	
Turnout		1,28,442	79.96	
Registered electors		1,60,632		
AIUDF gain from INC		Swing		
