= Dwaraka Nath Das =

Indian politician

Member of Parliament, Lok Sabha
- In office 1991-1998
- Preceded by: Sudarsan Das
- Succeeded by: Nepal Chandra Das
- Constituency: Karimganj

Personal details
- Party: Bharatiya Janata Party
- Occupation: Politician

Dwaraka Nath Das is an Indian politician. He was elected to the Lok Sabha, the lower house of Indian Parliament, from Karimganj, Assam in 1991 and 1996 as a member of the Bharatiya Janata Party. It was believed that he was the founding member of Bharatiya Janata Party Assam.
