= Kartik Sena Sinha =

Indian politician

Kartik Sena Sinha is an Indian politician from Assam who has been associated with the Bharatiya Janata Party, the All India United Democratic Front, and the Indian National Congress.

== Career ==
Sinha was elected to the Assam Legislative Assembly from Patharkandi in the 2006 Assam Legislative Assembly election as a Bharatiya Janata Party candidate.

He later contested the 2011 Assam Legislative Assembly election from Patharkandi as a candidate of the All India United Democratic Front (AIUDF), but was defeated by Indian National Congress candidate Monilal Gowala.

In the 2026 Assam Legislative Assembly election, Sinha contested from Patharkandi as an Indian National Congress candidate, but was defeated by Bharatiya Janata Party candidate Krishnendu Paul. Sinha secured 51,337 votes, while Paul received 98,101 votes.
