= Ramapayare Rabidas =

Indian politician

Ramapayare Rabidas is a Bharatiya Janata Party politician from Assam. He was elected to the Assam Legislative Assembly in the 1991 election from Ratabari constituency.
