= Nepal Chandra Das =

Indian politician

Member of Parliament, Lok Sabha
- In office 1998–2004
- Preceded by: Dwarka Nath Das
- Succeeded by: Lalit Mohan Suklabaidya
- Constituency: Karimganj, Assam

Personal details
- Born: 23 April 1944 Kuliarchar, Mymensingh District, Bengal Presidency, British India
- Died: 23 January 2018 (aged 73)
- Party: Indian National Congress
- Spouse: Milan Rani Das

Nepal Chandra Das (23 April 1944 - 23 January 2018) was an Indian politician from Assam. He was elected to the Lok Sabha, the lower house of Indian Parliament, from Karimganj, Assam in 1998 and 1999. He was a member of the Indian National Congress.
