= Karimganj North Assembly constituency =

Constituency of the Assam legislative assembly in India

Karimganj North
- Constituency No. 123 for the Assam Legislative Assembly

Constituency details
- Country: India
- Region: Northeast India
- State: Assam
- District: Sribhumi
- Lok Sabha constituency: Karimganj
- Established: 1951
- Reservation: None

Member of Legislative Assembly
- 16th Assam Legislative Assembly
- Incumbent Jakaria Ahmed
- Party: INC
- Elected year: 2026

Karimganj North Assembly constituency is one of the 126 constituencies of the Assam Legislative Assembly.

Karimganj North (constituency number 123) is one of the 4 constituencies located in Sribhumi district. Karimganj North is part of Karimganj Lok Sabha constituency.

== Members of Legislative Assembly ==
Year	Winner	Party
1957	Ranendra Mohan Das	Praja Socialist Party
1962	Rathindra Nath Sen	Independent politician
1967	Rathindra Nath Sen	Independent politician
1972	Abdul Muqtadir Choudhury	Indian National Congress
1978	Nishith Ranjan Das	Communist Party of India
1983	Ketaki Prasad Dutta	Indian National Congress
1985	Sirajul Hoque Choudhury	Independent politician
1991	Mission Ranjan Das	Bharatiya Janata Party
1996	Sirajul Hoque Choudhury	Asom Gana Parishad
2000	Mission Ranjan Das	Bharatiya Janata Party
2001	Mission Ranjan Das	Bharatiya Janata Party
2006	Mission Ranjan Das	Bharatiya Janata Party
2011	Kamalakhya Dey Purkayastha	Indian National Congress
2016	Kamalakhya Dey Purkayastha	Indian National Congress
2021	Kamalakhya Dey Purkayastha	Indian National Congress
2026	Jakaria Ahmed	Indian National Congress

== Election results ==
=== 2026 ===
2026 Assam Legislative Assembly election: Karimganj North
Party	Candidate	Votes	%	±%
INC	JAKARIA AHMED	122356	54.17	
BJP	SUBRATA BHATTACHARJEE	96353	42.66	
AIUDF	CHOUDHURY HIBBUR RASUL USAMA MABRUR	2543	0.22	
AITC	PARIMAL RANJAN ROY	486	0.9	
NOTA	NOTA	1,292	0.57	
Margin of victory		26003		
Turnout		225887		
Rejected ballots				
Registered electors				
INC hold		Swing		
