= Lalit Mohan Suklabaidya =

Indian politician

Member of Parliament, Lok Sabha
- In office 13 May 2004 – 16 May 2014
- Preceded by: Nepal Chandra Das
- Succeeded by: Radheshyam Biswas
- Constituency: Karimganj

Personal details
- Born: 26 December 1942 (age 83) Karimganj, Assam, India
- Party: Indian National Congress
- Spouse: Sandhya Suklabaidya
- Children: 2
- Education: University of Guwahati
- As of 30 August, 2012

Lalit Mohan Suklabaidya (born 1 December 1942) is an Indian politician who was a Member of Parliament from Lok Sabha. He represented the Karimganj constituency in Assam from 2004 to 2014 and is a member of the Indian National Congress.

== Personal life ==
Born in Karimganj, Assam, India, Suklabaidya was educated at the University of Guwahati and graduated with a MA degree in economics. He is married to Sandhya Suklabaidya and is father to two children. Lalit Mohan Suklabaidya has three grandchildren.

Suklabaidya taught at the Silchar Polytechnic and National Defence Academy. He retired as Joint Director of Higher Education of Assam.

His son Joydeep Shukla is a civil service officer. His grand daughter Naiwrita, is a politician.

== Political career ==
Suklabaidya has served two terms as a Member of Parliament (MP) from the Lok Sabha. He was elected from Karimganj in 2004 and was re-elected in 2009. Suklabaidya is a member of the Indian National Congress.
