= Karimganj Lok Sabha constituency =

Lok Sabha constituency in Assam

Coordinates: 24.9°N 92.4°E

Karimganj AS-7
- Lok Sabha constituency
- Interactive Map Outlining Karimganj Lok Sabha constituency

Constituency details
- Country: India
- Region: Northeast India
- State: Assam
- Division: Barak Valley
- District: Sribhumi; Hailakandi
- Assembly constituencies: 6
- Established: 1952
- Total electors: 14,14,520
- Reservation: None

Member of Parliament
- 18th Lok Sabha
- Incumbent Kripanath Mallah
- Party: BJP
- Alliance: NDA
- Elected year: 2024
- Preceded by: Radheshyam Biswas

Karimganj Lok Sabha constituency is one of 14 Lok Sabha constituencies in Assam, a state in north-eastern India, covering the Karimganj and Hailakandi districts in the Barak Valley.

== Assembly segments ==
Karimganj Lok Sabha constituency is composed of the following assembly segments:

=== Current assembly segments ===
No.	Name	District	Reserved for (SC/ST/None)	Member	Party	2024 Lead
121	Hailakandi	None	Hailakandi	Milon Das	BJP	BJP
122	Algapur–Katlicherra	None	Hailakandi	Zubair Anam Mazumder	INC	INC
123	Karimganj North	None	Karimganj	Jakaria Ahmed	INC	BJP
124	Karimganj South	None	Karimganj	Aminur Rashid Choudhury	INC	INC
125	Patharkandi	None	Karimganj	Krishnendu Paul	BJP	BJP
126	Ram Krishna Nagar	SC	Karimganj	Bijoy Malakar	BJP	BJP

=== Previous assembly segments ===
Constituency number	Name	District	Reserved for (SC/ST/None)
1	Ratabari	Karimganj	SC
2	Patharkandi	Karimganj	None
3	Karimganj North	Karimganj	None
4	Karimganj South	Karimganj	None
5	Badarpur	Karimganj	None
6	Hailakandi	Hailakandi	None
7	Katlicherra	Hailakandi	None
8	Algapur	Hailakandi	None

== Members of Parliament ==
Year	Winner	Party
1962	Nihar Ranjan Laskar	Indian National Congress
1967	Nihar Ranjan Laskar	Indian National Congress
1971	Nihar Ranjan Laskar	Indian National Congress
1977	Nihar Ranjan Laskar	Indian National Congress
1980	Nihar Ranjan Laskar	Indian National Congress
1984	Sudarsan Das	Indian Congress
1991	Dwarka Nath Das	Bharatiya Janata Party
1996	Dwarka Nath Das	Bharatiya Janata Party
1998	Nepal Chandra Das	Indian National Congress
1999	Nepal Chandra Das	Indian National Congress
2004	Lalit Mohan Suklabaidya	Indian National Congress
2009	Lalit Mohan Suklabaidya	Indian National Congress
2014	Radheshyam Biswas	All India United Democratic Front
2019	Kripanath Mallah	Bharatiya Janata Party
2024	Kripanath Mallah	Bharatiya Janata Party

== Election results ==
=== General Elections 2024 ===
2024 Indian general election: Karimganj
Party	Candidate	Votes	%	±%
BJP	Kripanath Mallah	545,093	47.49	+3.17
INC	Hafiz Rashid Ahmed Choudhury	526,733	45.89	+34.53
AIUDF	Sahabul Islam Choudhury	29,205	2.54	−38.46
NOTA	None Of The Above	2,940	0.25	−0.37
Majority		18,360	1.60	−2.02
Turnout		1,147,607	81.13	+1.95
BJP hold		Swing	+15.68 (Note: Two-party swing)	

=== General Elections 2019 ===
2019 Indian general elections: Karimganj
Party	Candidate	Votes	%	±%
BJP	Kripanath Mallah	473,046	44.62	+15.22
AIUDF	Radheshyam Biswas	434,657	41.00	+0.09
INC	Swarup Das	120,452	11.36	−14.18
NOTA	None of the above	6,555	0.62	+0.14
Majority		38,389	3.62	−7.89
Turnout		1,061,160	79.18	+3.11
BJP gain from AIUDF		Swing	+3.71 (Note: One-party swing)	

=== General elections 2014 ===
2014 Indian general elections: Karimganj
Party	Candidate	Votes	%	±%
AIUDF	Radheshyam Biswas	362,866	40.91	+4.17
BJP	Krishna Das	260,772	29.40	+7.67
INC	Lalit Mohan Suklabaidya	226,562	25.54	−12.35
NOTA	None of the above	4,266	0.48	−−−
Majority		102,094	11.51	+10.36
Turnout		887,782	76.14	+12.01
AIUDF gain from INC		Swing	+3.02 (Note: One-party swing)	

=== General elections 2009 ===
2009 Indian general elections: Karimganj
Party	Candidate	Votes	%	±%
INC	Lalit Mohan Suklabaidya	259,717	37.89	−9.92
AIUDF	Rajesh Mallah	251,797	36.73	New
BJP	Sudhangshu Das	148,945	21.73	−12.39
Majority		7,920	1.16	−12.53
Turnout		685,420	64.13	−4.78
INC hold		Swing		

=== General elections 2004 ===
General Election, 2004: Karimganj
Party	Candidate	Votes	%	±%
INC	Lalit Mohan Suklabaidya	321,059	47.81	
BJP	Parimal Suklabaidya	229,111	34.12	
AGP	Nepal Chandra Das	106,546	15.87	
Majority		91,948	13.69	
Turnout		671,491	68.91	
INC hold		Swing		

== See also ==
- Karimganj district
- 2019 Indian general election in Assam
- List of constituencies of the Lok Sabha
