= Bijoy Malakar =

Indian politician

- বিজয় মালাকার

Member of Assam Legislative Assembly
- Incumbent
- Assumed office 2019
- Preceded by: Kripanath Mallah
- Constituency: Ram Krishna Nagar

Personal details
- Born: Bijoy Malakar; 1 January 1980 (age 46) Karimganj, Assam, India
- Party: Bharatiya Janata Party
- Profession: Politician

Bijoy Malakar is an Indian politician and a member of the Assam Legislative Assembly representing the Ram Krishna Nagar constituency. He is affiliated with the Bharatiya Janata Party.

He was earlier elected to the Assam Legislative Assembly from the Ratabari constituency in the 2019 by-election as a member of the Bharatiya Janata Party, following the election of Kripanath Mallah to the Parliament of India.

In the 2026 Assam Legislative Assembly election, Malakar contested from the Ram Krishna Nagar constituency, which was formed following the delimitation of assembly constituencies in Assam. He secured one of the largest victory margins in the state by winning with a margin of over 80,000 votes.

== Early life ==
Bijoy Malakar was born in Karimganj district of Assam into a middle-class family. His father is Sankar Malakar and his mother is Pranoti Malakar.

== Education ==
Malakar completed his Class 10 education through the Praveksha examination under the Assam Sanskrit Board.

== Political career ==
Prior to entering politics, Malakar worked as a full-time businessman. He later joined the Bharatiya Janata Party and entered electoral politics in Assam.

== Constituency ==
The Ram Krishna Nagar Assembly constituency is one of the 126 state legislative assembly constituencies in Assam, India. It is one of the six assembly segments that form part of the Karimganj Lok Sabha constituency.

The constituency was originally established as Ratabari in 1962. During the 2023 delimitation exercise, the constituency was redrawn and renamed as Ram Krishna Nagar.

The reconstituted constituency includes Ramkrishna Nagar town and surrounding rural areas of the region. Since 2019, it has been represented by Bijoy Malakar of the Bharatiya Janata Party.

He was elected to the Assam Legislative Assembly from the Ratabari constituency in the 2019 by-election after Kripanath Mallah vacated the seat upon being elected to the Parliament of India. He subsequently retained the Ratabari seat in the 2021 Assam Legislative Assembly election.

Following delimitation, he contested from the Ram Krishna Nagar constituency in the 2026 Assam Assembly election and won with a decisive margin.

== Electoral history ==
Year	Constituency	Party	Result	Margin
2019	Ratabari	BJP	Elected	—
2021	Ratabari	BJP	Elected	—
2026	Ram Krishna Nagar	BJP	Elected	80,000+
