= Karimganj =

Karimganj Kōrimgônj/ Shrībhūmi (Bengali)
- Town
- Sribhumi
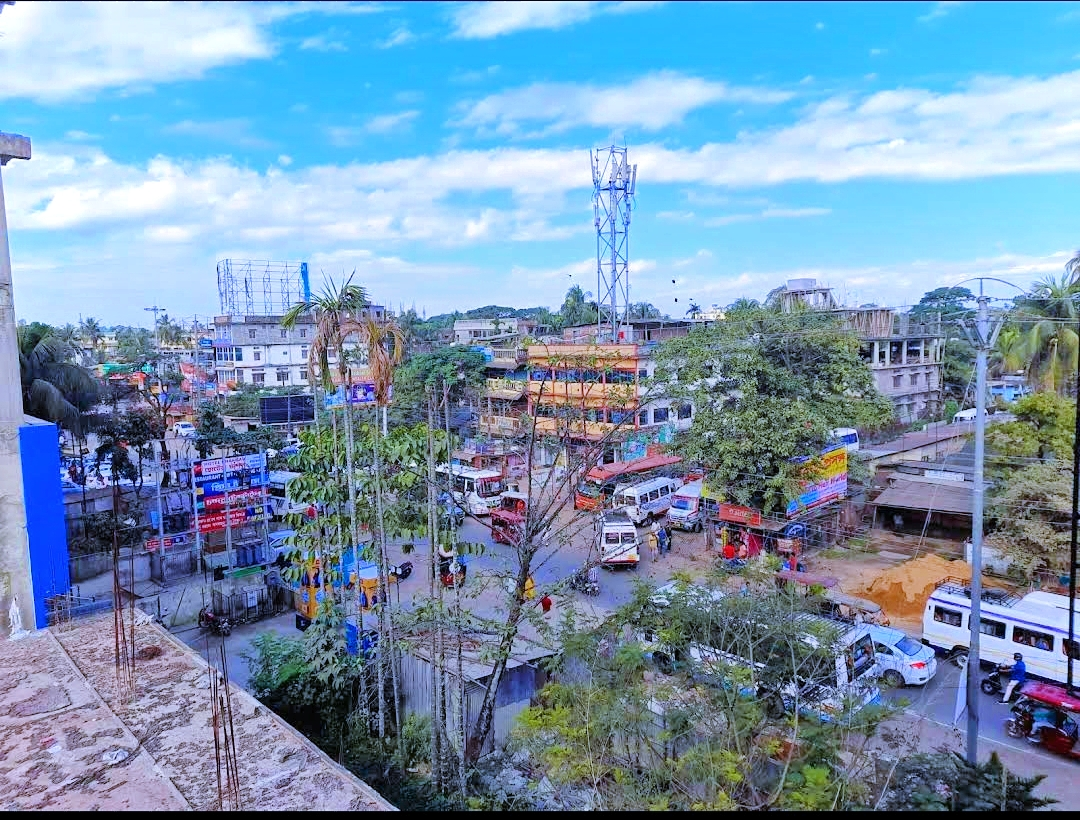
- Top to bottom: Silchar road, AOC point

- Location within Assam Location within India Location within Asia
- Coordinates: 24.87°N 92.35°E
- Country: India
- State: Assam
- District: Karimganj

Government
  - Type: Municipality
  - Body: Karimganj Municipality Board
  - Chairman: Rabindra Chandra Deb (BJP)
  - Vice Chairman: Sukhendu Das (BJP)
- Elevation: 13 m (43 ft)

Population (2011)
  - Total: 56,854
  - Rank: 12
  - Density: 16.09/km^{2} (41.7/sq mi)

Languages
  - Official: Bengali
  - Associate official: Meitei (Manipuri)
  - Regional: Sylheti
- Time zone: UTC+5:30 (IST)
- PIN: 788710 to 788713
- ISO 3166 code: IN-AS
- Vehicle registration: AS 10
- Website: sribhumi.assam.gov.in

Karimganj, officially Sribhumi, is a town in the Karimganj district of the Indian state of Assam. It is the administrative headquarters of the district.

Karimganj town is located at 24.87°N 92.35°E. The area of Karimganj Town is 16.09 km^{2}. It has an average elevation of 13 metres (42 feet).

Bengali and Meitei (Manipuri) are the official and the additional official languages of the town respectively.

On 21 November 2024, the Assam government renamed Karimganj town as Sribhumi town.

== Demographics ==
=== Population ===
As per the 2011 Census of India, Karimganj town had a population of 56,854 comprising 28,473 males and 28,381 females. Children aged 0-6 years numbered 4,946. The town had an overall literacy rate of 86.35%, with male literacy at 87.91% and female literacy at 84.78%. The sex ratio was 996 females per 1,000 males. As of 2011, there were 12,234 households in the town.

=== Religion ===
Religion in Karimganj Town (2011)
1. Hinduism (86.6%)
2. Islam (12.1%)
3. Christianity (0.63%)
4. Jainism (0.62%)
5. Others (0.12%)

Most of the people in the town follow Hinduism, with significant followers of Islam and a small Christian and Jain population.

== Politics ==
Karimganj is a part of Karimganj North Assembly constituency and Karimganj (Lok Sabha constituency).

Bharatiya Janata Party's Kripanath Mallah is the current Member of Parliament from Karimganj Lok Sabha constituency. While Kamalakhya Dey Purkayastha is the MLA from Karimganj North Assembly constituency.

== Educational institutes ==
Various educational institutions and higher secondary are well established and run by the government in Karimganj.

Among them, the most notable are:

- Barak Valley Engineering College (BVEC). Located 22.6 km away from the town, it is the first and only State Govt-Engineering college in the entire Barak Valley.
- Karimganj Polytechnic

Degree colleges:

- Karimganj College
- Karimganj Law College
- Ramkrishna Nagar College
- Rabindra Sadan Girls' College

Sports parks:

- Government Boys' HS School Ground

All colleges in Karimganj are affiliated with Assam University.

== Notable people ==
- Dwarka Nath Das, former MP of Karimganj (1991-1998)
- Kripanath Mallah, current MP of Karimganj
- Bijoy Malakar, current MLA of Ratabari LAC, Karimganj
- Siddique Ahmed, MLA of Karimganj South

== See also ==
- Karimganj (Lok Sabha constituency)
