= Paschimbhag copperplate inscription =

Paschimbhag copperplate inscription of Srichandra
- পশ্চিমভাগ তাম্রশাসন শ্রীচন্দ্র পশ্চিমভাগ তাম্রশাসন
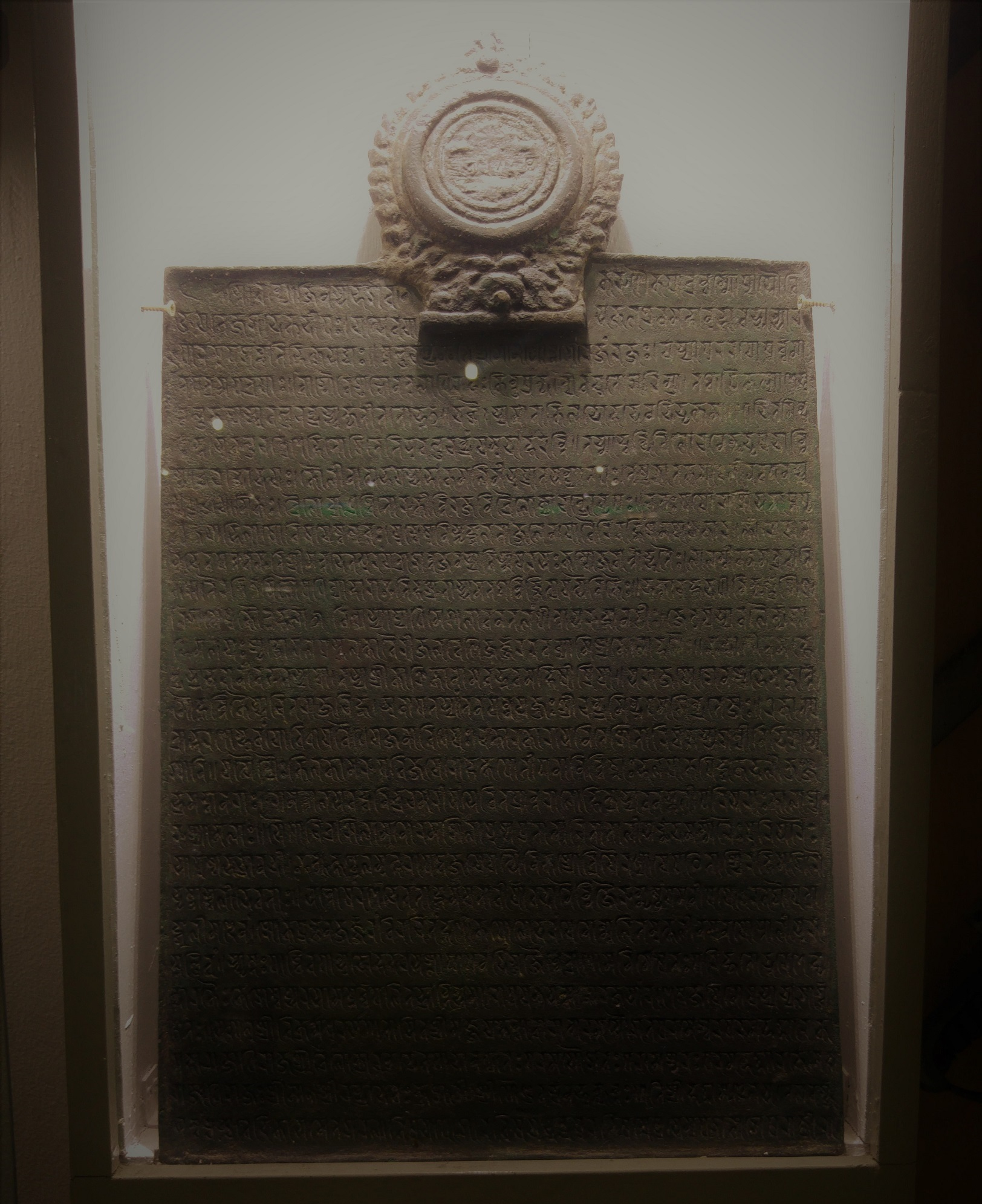
- Copperplate preserved in the Bhasha Sainik Matin Uddin Ahmed Museum, Sylhet
- Material: Copper
- Height: 17.5 inches (44 cm)
- Width: 12 inches (30 cm)
- Weight: 24 pounds (11 kg)
- Writing: Sanskrit in Northern Nāgarī
- Created: 935 CE
- Discovered: 1958; Paschimbhag, Rajnagar, Moulvibazar
- Discovered by: Paresh Paul, Binod Bihari Chakravarti
- Classification: Copperplate inscription

The Pahcimbhag copperplate inscription, Srichandra Paschimbhag copperplate inscription or simply Chandrapur inscription is a copperplate inscription issued in 935 CE by Srichandra, the second king of the Chandra Dynasty of south-east Bengal. The inscription was discovered in the village of Paschimbhag, Moulvibazar district (then a Mahakuma). It is one of 12 known copperplate inscriptions by Chandra Dynasty kings. The inscription is mainly a deed of donation, in which Srichandra grants lands for many Brahmins and for nine monasteries in the Sylhet region, which formed Chandrapur University, named after Srichandra. It includes a detailed description of the Chandra kingdom and the Palas and Kamboja Pala rulers of Bengal and refers to the society of pre-medieval Bengal.

== History ==
Traillokyachandra (reign ca. 900–930) founded the Chandra dynasty in south-eastern Bengal in the early 10th century. After Traillokyachandra, Raja Srichandra ascended the throne, taking the titles "Paramsaugata", "Parameshwar", "Parambhattārak" and "Mahārājādhirāj". According to Dynastic History of Bengal by Abdul Momin Chowdhury, Srichandra ruled 45 years, from 930 to 975 CE, while according to Ramesh Chandra Majumdar's book History of Bangladesh Srichandra reigned from 905 to 955 CE. Either way, Srichandra reigned the longest among the five Chandra kings. Parts of Manikganj, Dhaka, Faridpur along the banks of the Padma, Shrihatta and Cumilla came under his rule. Srichandra moved his capital from Devparvat to Bikrampur (in present-day Munshiganj).

== Discovery ==
In 1958, a copperplate named "Chandrapur Shāsana" was found in Paschimbhag village in the then Moulvibazar Mahakuma of Sylhet District (currently Panchgaon Union, Rajnagar Upazila). Later the inscription was known as the "Paschimbhag copperplate" after the village name.

A villager named Paresh Paul is credited with discovering the copperplate while digging a pond. However, Kamalakanta Gupta, decipherer of the copperplate, says in his 1967 book Copper-plates of Sylhet that someone named Binod Bihari Chakraborty found the copperplate on his moorlands. Shyamapada Kabyatirtha, a resident of a nearby village, collected the copperplate and, in 1961, gave it to Aminur Rashid Chowdhury, a local newspaper editor and member of the Sylhet Historical and Archaeological Society.

== Description ==
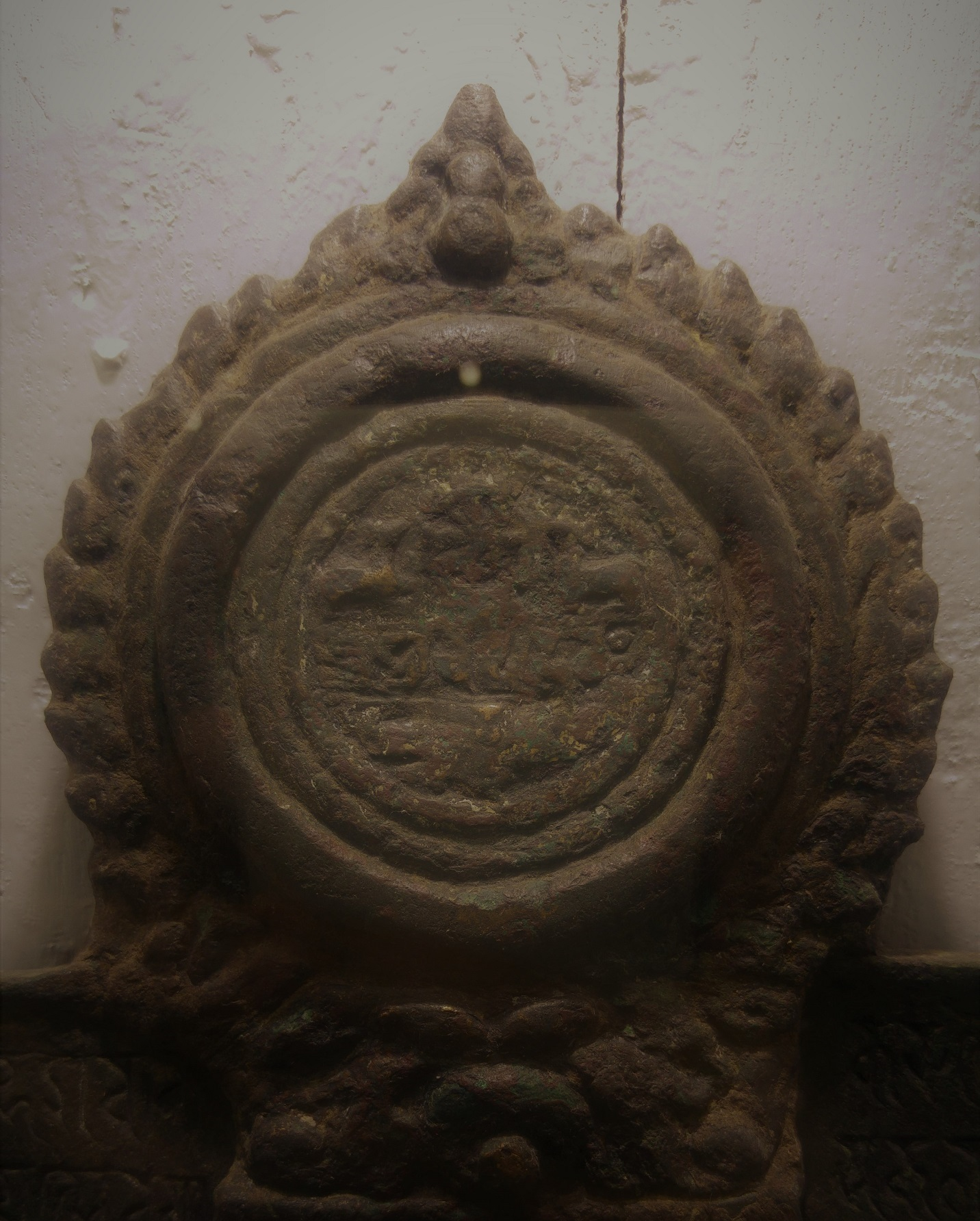
The seal of the copperplate

A complete description of the copperplate can be found Copper-plates of Sylhet by Kamalakanta Gupta and his article collection Tāmroshāshone Srihotto (Srihatta in the Copperplates) compiled by Jafir Setu. The copperplate was inscribed by an engraver named Haradās. It is a written document issued during the Kamboja Pala dynasty in Bengal. It was engraved in a 17.5-by-12-inch (440 mm × 300 mm) plate made of copper. The copperplate and seal weigh 24 pounds (11 kg).

There is a seal centered atop the copperplate. The seal extends about 5 inches into the main copperplate, dividing the first two lines of the script on each side of the plate. A Dharmachakramudrā, or "wheel of the law", is engraved in the seal. Two deer and circles are engraved around the wheel. These symbolise the first appearance of Gautama Buddha as Dharmachakra during his Mrigayā (hunting). The name of Raja Shri-Shri Chandra Deva (Raja Srichandra) is under the seal.

There are 65 lines in the inscription; 28 on the front and 37 lines on the back. The text is in Sanskrit using the Northern Nāgarī letters.

== Inscription ==
A detailed description of the Chandras can be found in the Paschimbhag inscription. The inscription contains a hymn of the Buddha, a lineal introduction of Srichandra as the second ruler of the Chandra dynasty, descriptions of expeditions and conquests of his father Traillokyachandra and the names of Srichandra's council members who were the attestors of the Shāsana. There is the name of Devparvat of Samatata on the bank of river Khirodā (or Kshirodā). According to the inscription, Traillokyachandra protected Lālāmbī by defeating the Kamboja attackers of Samatata who came from the forest of the Lalmai hills. However, according to Niharranjan Ray, there is a clear evidence in the script that the Chandra capital Devparvat was destroyed by the Kamboja invaders, as it does not clearly claim Traillokyachandra's victory over them, nevertheless, their capital was transferred from Devparvat to Bikrampur.

The inscription is mainly an order for land donation. In it, Srichandra donates lands of Chandrapur, Garalā and Pogārā vishayas (Note: Subdivision; third-level administrative units.) under Shrihatta Mandala (Note: Division; second-level administrative units.) of Pundravardhanabhukti (Note: Province; first-level administrative units.) for various reasons. Among the vishayas, Chandrapur was the largest, and thus the script is called "Chandrapur Shāshana". Lands are granted for persons and other expenses related to nine monasteries. In these monasteries, students got a higher education from the Upadhyay or teachers.

In the first part of the inscription, 120 patakas (Note: One pataka is equal to 10 dronas, 50 acres or 150 bighas.) (about 6000 acres) are granted to Chandrapur Matha. (Note: The monastery is mentioned as "Brāhmapur" or "Brahmapur" in the inscription, as Brahma was worshipped there. Later it was named after Srichandra as "Chandrapur".) According to Select Inscription: Bearing on Indian History and Civilization, edited by Dineshchandra Sircar, the first 20 patakas (about 500 acres) are given to the Upadhyay (professor or teacher) or abbot of the monastery named Pratibaddha Chandra. The grammar of Chandragomin was mainly taught in this monastery. The other lands are distributed among ten Brahmin students, five partial Brahmins for their meals, a Brahmin cook, an astrologer, a kayastha or writer, four malakaras, two tailikas, two potters, fives kahlikas, two conch players, two drummers, eight Dragarhikas, 22 karmakaras or laborers, souters, two sutradharas or carpenters, two architects and two blacksmiths. Nine other workers receive 47 more patakas.

On the second part of the inscription, 280 more patakas (almost 14,000 acres) are given to eight other monasteries (four Deshantariya monasteries and four Bangala monasteries). These lands are also distributed among several types and classes of people. In these eight monasteries, there was a Vaidya or physician for each four monasteries. In the religious complex of eight monasteries, Agnidev or Vaishvanar, Yogeshwar, Jaimini or Jamni and Mahakal were worshipped. Chaturvedas were taught in these eight monasteries. A combined university complex, Chandrapur University, named after Srichandra, was established in the Shrihatta region consisting of these nine monasteries.

On the third part of the inscription, the rest of the properties of Chandrapur and other vishayas are distributed among Brahmin Gārgas and six thousand other Brahmins. According to some historians, the number six thousand may be indefinite or exaggerated, as there are only 38 Brahmins named in the inscription. However, the nearby villages, Khemasahasra (Kshemasahasra), Bālisahasra and Mahasahasra, are believed to take their names from the concept of Sahasra, or "thousand Brahmins". Additionally, the existence of an ancient river port named Indeshwar Naukabandha (Note: The location of the Indeshwar river port is unclear. It is thought to be somewhere in Rajnagar or Fenchuganj.) in the central Shrihatta can be traced from the inscription. Srichandra donated 52 patakas (about 2,600 acres) of land for the river port.

The land distribution includes one socially unconventional aspect: Srichandra gives three patakas to a person of the Vaidya caste while a Brahmin and a Kayastha were given two and 2.5 patakas, respectively. This may had resulted in social problems.

== Decipherment and preservation ==
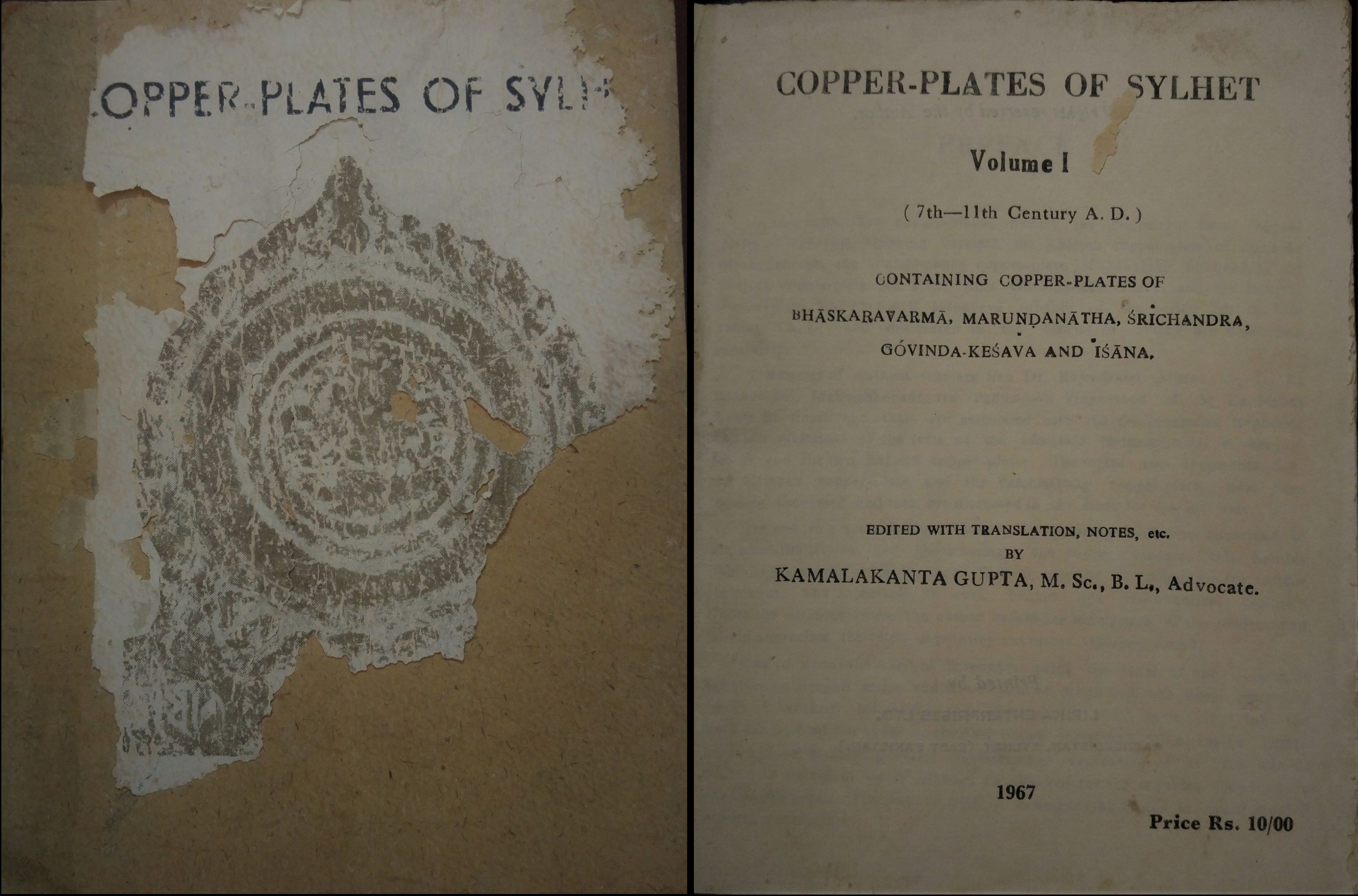
A copy of Copper-plates of Sylhet by Kamalakanta Gupta preserved in Bhasha Sainik Matin Uddin Ahmed Museum

In 1961, Kamalakanta Gupta deciphered the inscription with the help of collector Aminur Rashid Chowdhury and the Sylhet Historical and Archaeological Society. In 1967, he published the text in his book Copper-plates of Sylhet from Chowdhury's publishing house Lipika Enterprise Limited. Ahmad Hasan Dani, founder of the Bangladesh Asiatic Society, also deciphered the inscription and translated it into English.

After the society had been dissolved, Aminur Rashid Chowdhury took the copperplate to his house. On 13 August 2017, it was given to the Bhasha Sainik Matin Uddin Ahmed Museum, located in the Central Muslim Sahitya Sangsad building near Dargah Gate, Sylhet. Along with the plate, a copy of Gupta's Copper-plates of Sylhet is also preserved in the museum.

== Archaeological and historical importance ==
Twelve copperplates of Chandra kings have been discovered, eight of which were issued by Raja Srichandra. (Note: The eight known copperplates of Srichandra are the "Rampal copperplate", "Kedarpur copperplate", "Edilpur copperplate", "Madanpur copperplate", "Dulla copperplate", "Bogra copperplate", "Paschimbhag copperplate" and an unknown copperplate preserved in the Bangladesh National Museum.) Among them, the Paschimbhag copperplate is the most significant. Srichandra issued the inscription in the fifth year of his rule (935 CE). Although the focus of the inscription is on land grants, it includes an extensive description of the Chandra dynasty, their history, local geography, land distribution system and religion, lifestyle, language and many other aspects of local residents. The inscription affirms that Traillokyachandra and his son Srichandra extended their rule up to Kamarupa (present-day Assam) in north-eastern India. Details of Srichandra's Kamrupa campaign can be found from the Shāsana. Srichandra also campaigned against the Gauda Kingdom and helped to restore the empire of Pala emperor Gopala III. (Note: Gopala III was mentioned as "Gōpāla Sangrōpane Mahōtsavagūrū" (presidor of the operation for the establishment of Gopala) in the inscription. He was thought to be Gopala II as described in the references. However, after the reassessment of the chronology of Pala dynasty, existence of another Gopala reigning from 872 CE was accepted by the historians. Consequently, the contemporary Pala king of Srichandra, Gopala II, was referred as Gopala III (reign 940–960 CE). Further reading: Gopala II#Re-evaluation of the Pala chronology) The inscription administratively includes Chandrapur in the Pundravardhanbhukti and thus affirms the inclusion of the north-eastern region of Srihatta to the Pundravardhana. The inscription also confirms the emergence of Kamboja Palas in the Pala Empire.

The location of Chandrapur and Chandrapur University can be traced from the inscription. There was a higher education institution named Chandrapur University in the then Shrihatta (assumed location at Sagarnal in Juri, Moulvibazar (Note: The exact location of Chandrapur University is still unknown. However it is thought to have been in Dighirpar of Sagarnal.)), which was older than Oxford, Cambridge or even Jagaddala Vihara. Srichandra established the university in his name over 400 patakas land in 935 CE. Chaturvedas, Chāndra grammar, Hindu Shastra, Kauṭilya's Arthashastra, Hetuvidya, medicine, astrology, surgery, metallurgy, and phonetics were taught in the university. (Note: Chandragomin was a Buddhist scholar. Except for Chandragomin grammar, the subjects are mainly related to Hinduism.) Suniti Kumar Chatterji, in a letter to Kamalakanta Gupta, expressed his opinion that Chandrapur University was a high-quality institution like Mahasthangarh or Taxila. According to Jafir Setu, the university in Chandrapur was as great as Nalanda or Odantapuri and was mainly a center for religious education. Land distribution for 25 classes of employees, students and guests indicates an organized system consistent with modern universities. The existence of the university is confirmed both by the Paschimbhag inscription and the "Bhatera inscriptions" found in nearby Rajar Tila of Bhatera Union, and are the basis for archaeological research being pursued by the Bangladesh Archaeological Department. Moreover, Kamalakanta Gupta, in his article, "Maharaja Shrichondrer Nobolobdho Prachin (Paschimbhag) Tamrashashon" (The Newly Discovered [Paschimbhag] Copperplate inscription of Maharaja Srichandra), published in 1962, mentioned an administrative city named "Shrichandrapur" or "Chandrapur" in Chandrapur Vishaya where the vishayapati (the district administrator or ruler of a Vishaya) may had lived. He also urged expeditions to find the lost city.

Despite being a Buddhist, Srichandra donated a large property of Chandrapur and related Vishayas to the Hindu Brahmins and their monasteries by the name of Gautama Buddha. Kamalakanta Gupta remarked that the donation was exceptional among the Buddhist kings of India at that time.

That the rulers favoured emigrants (Note: "Deshāntari", "Deshāntaria" or "Deshantariā", as mentioned in the inscription.) over local residents to bring uncultivated lands under cultivation and settle uninhabited lands and thus backed colonial settlements is evident in the inscription. It also shows that there were two subgroups (Bangāl (Note: Locals or Deshiyas were referred to as "Bangāl" in the inscription.) and Deshāntariā) in the society despite worshipping the same deity and living in the same area. This division is somewhat rare in early Bengal cultures. The social division may be a result of inconsistencies in the land distribution system at that time. These monasteries got benefits from the kings and worked to support the rulers.

== See also ==
- Gopala I
- History of Sylhet
- Kalyanachandra
- Mahipala II
- Nidhanpur copperplate inscription
