= Chandrapur University =

Ancient educational institution and monastery in Bangladesh

- চন্দ্রপুর বিশ্ববিদ্যালয় (Bengali)
- Srichandrapur University শ্রীচন্দ্রপুর বিশ্ববিদ্যালয়
- Possible location for discovering Chandrapur University
- 24.468635°N 92.141237°E
- Type: ancient educational institutions and monastery
- Cultures: Mixed Buddhist and Hindu culture
- Location: Sagornal, Juri, Moulvibazar
- Region: Sylhet, Bangladesh
- Part of: Shrihatta, Chandra kingdom

History
- Built: 935 CE
- Built by: Srichandra
- Abandoned: Unknown

Site notes
- Material: Unknown
- Area: 2,000 acres (810 ha)
- Architectural style: Unknown
- Excavation dates: In process
- Discovered: Undiscovered
- Condition: Undiscovered
- Primary land survey in progress

Chandrapur University or Srichandrapur University was a 10th century educational institution and monastery. Srichandra, a ruler of the Chandra dynasty, established it in 935 CE on 20,000 acres (8,100 ha). Efforts by the Archaeological Department of Bangladesh to locate the original ruins are ongoing.

== History ==
Srichandra of the Chandra dynasty ruled between approximately 930 and 975 CE. However, some claim he reigned between 905 and 950 CE. Srichandra established the institution in the fifth year of his reign (approx. 935 CE). Srichandra granted 400 Pataks, 20,000 acres (8,100 ha), of land for the university's construction.

In 1958, a copperplate inscription issued by Srichandra was discovered in the Paschimbhag village of Rajnagar Upazila in the Moulvibazar District (then a Mahakuma of the Sylhet district). The copperplate contains a detailed description of the university.

== Description ==
In 935 CE, Srichandra, a ruler of the Chandra dynasty of south-east Bengal, issued a copperplate known as the Chandrapur Shasana (Paschimbhag inscription) granting lands in the Shrihatta division for nine adjacent monasteries which subsequently became a single institution.

Of the nine monasteries, one was called the Brahmapur (because Brahma was worshiped) or the Srichandrapur monastery, four were called Bangal monasteries and remaining four were called Deshantaria (Bengali: দেশান্তরীয়, romanized: Dēśāntarīẏa, lit. 'emigrants') monasteries. The Chaturvedas were studied in these monasteries for the most part. Chāndra grammar was also taught. According to historians, the Upadhyay or vice chancellor of the first monastery, Pratibaddha Chandra, was a scholar of Chandragomin (Chāndra) grammar. Chaturvedas, Hindu Shastra, Kauṭilya's Arthashastra, Hetuvidya, medicine, astrology, surgery, metallurgy, and phonetics were included in the curriculum. The university was able to house boarders was responsible for supervising them.

The contents of the Paschimbhag inscription include land grants made by Srichandra and described in "Copper-plates of Sylhet" by Kamalakanta Gupta and in "Select Inscription: Bearing on Indian History and Civilization" edited by Dineshchandra Sircar. 120 patakas, about 6,000 acres (2,400 ha), were granted to the first monastery (Brahmapur Maṭha) of which 10 patakas were for Pratibaddha Chandra, the monastery's vice chancellor. The other lands were distributed among: ten students, five partial brahmins for their meals, one brahmin cook, astrologer, kayastha or writer, four malakaras, two tailikas, two potters, five kahlikas, two conch players, two drummers, eight Dragarhikas, 22 karmakaras or laborers, souters (shoemaker), two sutradharas or carpenters, two architects and two blacksmiths. There were 47 more patakas for nine other workers. Another 280 patakas were granted for eight other monasteries. The university's architecture was pleasant and included neatly decorated artworks.

Though the history of the establishment of the university is clear, historians are unsure of the cause of its destruction and when this happened.

== Location ==
Kamalakanta Gupta, a decipherer of the Paschimbhag inscription, researcher Ramesh Chandra Majumdar, Jadunath Sarkar, and Muhammed Sadique, chairman of Bangladesh Public Service Commission, mentioned the existence of Chandrapur. Kamalakanta Gupta and other historians claimed that its location is clearly described in the inscription. There was the river Koshiar to the north, the river Mani to the south, the Greater Kottali Sima and the hilly region of the Indeswar (Latu, Admari, Adamail, the Patharia hills or Longla hills) to the east and the Janju Khataka, the Kashtanya Khataka and the Betraghanggi river to the west of Chandrapur. Kamalakanta Gupta claimed Koshiar was the river Kushiara and Mani was the river Manu. However, he was uncertain of the eastern and western boundaries of Chandrapur. Some claimed the Greater Kottali to be the Trishira stone of Tripura (which is also known as Unakoti), but Gupta argues that it could be any large police station or kotwali (Bengali: কোতোয়ালি, Kōtōẏāli police outpost). He also commented that Janju Khataka, Kashtanya Khataka and Betraghanggi could be three individual rivers in the region that were connected. In between them Betraghanggi is thought to have been the Gunggai river flowing in the Dinarpur hills region of the Habiganj District. The other rivers are thought to have been the Khowai, the Karangi, the Betra and the Bibiyana.

According to Professor Nripendralal Das, since the Paschimbhag copperplate was discovered in the Rajnagar district, and other copperplates of different kings have been discovered surrounding the Kalapur of Sreemangal and the Nidhanpur of Beanibazar, the probable location for the ruins of Chandrapur is somewhere between the two locations. On the other hand, Padmanath Bhattacharya Vidya Vinod, translator of the Nidhanpur copperplate inscription, claimed that Chandrapur was situated somewhere in the Habiganj District.

In July–August 2020, the Archaeological Department of Bangladesh began a land survey estimating at least one monastery to be situated at Dighirpar of the Sagornal Union in Juri, Moulvibazar district. There is also a city and a tea garden named Chandrapur in West Tripura, India, bordering Sagornal.

== Archaeological exploration ==
The decipherer of the Paschimbhag inscription, Kamalakanta Gupta, published an article titled "Newly Obtained Ancient (Paschimbhag) Copperplate Inscription of Maharaja Srichandra" (মহারাজা শ্রীচন্দ্রের নবলব্ধ প্রাচীন (পশ্চিমভাগ) তাম্রশাসন) in 1962 where he expressed his conjecture about the city of Chandrapur or Srichandrapur, the center of Chandrapur Vishaya (second-level administrative division) where the district administrator (Vishayapati) lived. He also claimed that there was a monastery or Vihara in the city and urged the formation of an expedition to locate it. The expedition was formed 62 years after the discovery of the Paschimbhag copperplate inscription in 1958.

On 15 July 2020, the Archaeological Department of Bangladesh issued a notice to the regional archaeological office in Sylhet, Chittagong and Cumilla they would be surveying looking to resurrect Chandrapur University. There were instructions for on-the-spot recognition and the possibility of preservation and renovation under the Antiques Act of 1968. Though the land survey started according to the notice, the archaeological team still has no idea of the exact location of the University. However, some pottery, beads and burnt bricks have been recovered. According to the archaeological team, at least a river port can be found at the site even if the ruins of the university can not be detected. For this reason, the Archaeological Department plans to resurvey at the Sagornal of Juri, the Paschimbhag of Rajnagar and the Kamala Ranir Dighi in Kulaura in the dry season.

== Importance ==
Chandrapur University in Shrihatta was as large as other religious institutions like Nalanda, Taxila, Mahasthangarh or Odantapuri and was established before Oxford, and Cambridge universities or even the Jagaddala Vihara. Chandrapur university was unique in contrast with other universities and the viharas established by Buddhist kings in India. Its curriculum included almost all of the subjects from the Hindu Shastra except the grammar of Chandragomin who was Buddhist by religion. Moreover the students of this university were also Hindu Brahmins. The nine monasteries were overseen mainly by Hindu Brahmins. This is because the Buddhist king, Srichandra, granted lands in Paschimbhag in the name of Buddha for nine Brahmin monasteries where the Chaturvedas were mainly taught. Kamalakanta Gupta referred to this grant as "unique among other Buddhist kings" since it implies Srichandra's favouritism towards Brahmins.

Land distribution among 25 classes of people, guests, and students indicates an efficient administration in the universities. According to Zafir Setu, this administrative arrangement is more consistent with the present-day university system.
