= Imam Uddin Ahmed =

Bangladeshi politician

Alhaj Imam Uddin Ahmed
- ইমাম উদ্দিন আহমদ

Member of the Bangladesh Parliament for Moulvibazar-1
- In office 7 May 1986 – 3 March 1988
- Succeeded by: Ebadur Rahman Chowdhury

Personal details
- Party: Jatiya Party (Ershad)
- Other political affiliations: Awami League

Imam Uddin Ahmed (Bengali: ইমাম উদ্দিন আহমদ) is a Jatiya Party (Ershad) politician and a former member of parliament for Moulvibazar-1.

== Career ==
Ahmed stood up for the 1986 Bangladeshi general elections as a Jatiya Party candidate for the newly renamed Moulvibazar-1 (Barlekha-Juri) constituency. During the 1991 Bangladeshi general elections, he was an Awami League candidate and lost to Ebadur Rahman Chowdhury.
