= Behaidohor =

Coordinates: 24.8020°N 92.2040°E

Behai Dohor বিহাইডহর Behai Dohor
- Village
- Interactive map of Behai Dohor
- Country: Bangladesh
- Division: Sylhet
- District: Moulvibazar
- Upazila: Barlekha
- Union Parishad: Nij Bahadurpur
- Ward: 1

Population
  - Total: 1,250

Behaidohor (Bengali: বিহাইডহর) is a village in Bangladesh, located in Nij Bahadurpur Union, Barlekha Upazila, Moulvibazar District. The Behaidohor Hafijia Madrasha is an educational institution there.

The population of this village is 1,250 and consists mostly of Bengali Muslims of Sylheti descent. The village has a cemetery, the Behaidohor Central Graveyard, as well as a school called Behaidohor Government Primary School. There is a mosques in the village, called Behaidohor Jame Masjid and one eidgah, Behaidohor-Buali Central Eidgah.
