= Srichandra =

Second ruler of the Chandra Dynasty (r. c. 930–975)

- Reign: 930 – 975
- Predecessor: Traillokyachandra
- Successor: Kalyanachandra
- Issue: Kalyanachandra
- House: Chandra
- Dynasty: Chandra
- Father: Traillokyachandra
- Religion: Buddhism

Srichandra (reigned c. 930–975) was the second and most influential ruler of the Chandra Dynasty in eastern Bengal.

== Life ==
After Traillokyachandra, Srichandra ascended the throne, taking the titles "Paramsaugata", "Parameshwar", "Parambhattārak" and "Mahārājādhirāj". According to the book Dynastic History of Bengal by Abdul Momin Chowdhury, Srichandra ruled 45 years, from 930 to 975 CE. Again, Ramesh Chandra Majumdar mentioned in his book, History of Bangladesh that Srichandra reigned from 905 to 955 CE. However, Srichandra reigned the longest period among the five Chandra kings. Parts of Manikganj, Dhaka, Faridpur along the banks of the Padma, Shrihatta and Cumilla came under his rule. Srichandra moved his capital from Devparvat to Bikrampur (under present-day Munshiganj). A detailed description of the Chandras can be found from the Paschimbhag copperplate inscription.

Much of what is known of him comes from the copper plates from Mainamati as well as the Paschimbhag copperplate discovered in the village of Paschimbhag in Moulvibazar detailing his successful campaign against the Kingdom of Kamarupa. He is also credited with expanding his father's empire to encompass the kingdoms of Vanga and Samatata. Under his command, the Harikelan armies also successfully fought the Pala Empire and possibly the Kambojas of northern Bengal. His contemporary Pala ruler was Gopala III, whom he aided in becoming king after defeating the armies of King Ratna Pala of Kamarupa. Srichandra also moved the administrative center of the empire from Devaparvata to his newly built capital, Vikrampur.

== Religion ==
According to the copper plates, although Srichandra was a devout Buddhist and a patron of his faith, he was tolerant of other religious beliefs among his subjects, as evidenced by his attempts to settle displaced Brahmins within his empire. His son, Kalyanchandra was also a Buddhist. According to the 930 A.D Sylhet grant, Srichandra settled 6000 Brahmins in his empire.

== Notes ==
Preceded by Traillokyachandra	Candra King; 930 – 975 CE	Succeeded by Kalyanachandra
