= Sagornal Senior Alim Madrasha =

Madrasa in Maulvibazar, Bangladesh

Location
- Uttar Sagornal, Juri Upazila, Moulvibazar District; Bangladesh
- Coordinates: 24.4665°N 92.1314°E

Information
- Type: Madrasa
- Faculty: 23
- Grades: XI–XII
- Enrollment: 486

Sagornal Senior Alim Madrasha (Bengali: সাগরনাল সিনিয়র আলিম মাদ্রাসা, Arabic: المدرسة العالمية ساغرنال) is a private madrasa, located in Sagornal, Juri Upazila, Maulvibazar District.
