= Kathaltali =

Coordinates: 24.6740°N 92.1709°E

Kathaltali Kathaltoli
- Village
- Interactive map of Kathaltali
- Country: Bangladesh
- Division: Sylhet
- District: Moulvibazar District
- Upazila: Barlekha
- Union Parishad: North Dakshinbhag
- Ward: 4 & 5

Population
  - Total: 3,162

Kathaltali (Bengali: কাঠালতলী, romanized: Kathaltoli, lit. 'Under the jackfruit') is a large village (separated into two villages) located in North Dakshinbhag Union of Barlekha Upazila in Moulvibazar District. The population of the village is 3,162 with 1,545 living in South Kathaltali and 1,617 living in North Kathaltali. North Kathaltali is in the 4th ward of the Union while South Kathaltali is in the 5th ward. It has three mosques, Kathaltali Jame Mosque, Kathaltali Taki Jame Mosque and Kathaltali Bazar Jame Mosque. Kathaltali also has one eidgah. There are three sports club in the village - the Kathaltali Cricket Club, Shonar Bangla Cricket Club, Taki Sports Association .

== History ==
The name Kathaltoli is made up of two words from Sylheti language. Kathal is the word for jackfruit while Toli refers to under.

In 1929, the Kathaltali Government Primary School .

== Notable people ==
- Ebadot Hossain, cricketer
