= Juri High School =

Educational institution in Bangladesh

Coordinates: 24.593590°N 92.119633°E

Information
- Established: 1930; 95 years ago
- Headmaster: Sitangshu Shekar Das
- Teaching staff: c.36
- Classes: 6-10
- Enrollment: c.2200

Jury Govt Model High School is a secondary school in Juri town, Juri Upazila, Moulvibazar District, Sylhet Division, Bangladesh. It was established in 1930. Classes are from 6 to 10. The total number of students is about 2200. Teaching staff is about 36. Sitangshu Shekar Das is Headmaster.

== See also ==
- Education in Bangladesh
