= Dhamoirhat Upazila =

Dhamoirhat Upazila ধামইরহাট উপজেলা
- Upazila of Bangladesh
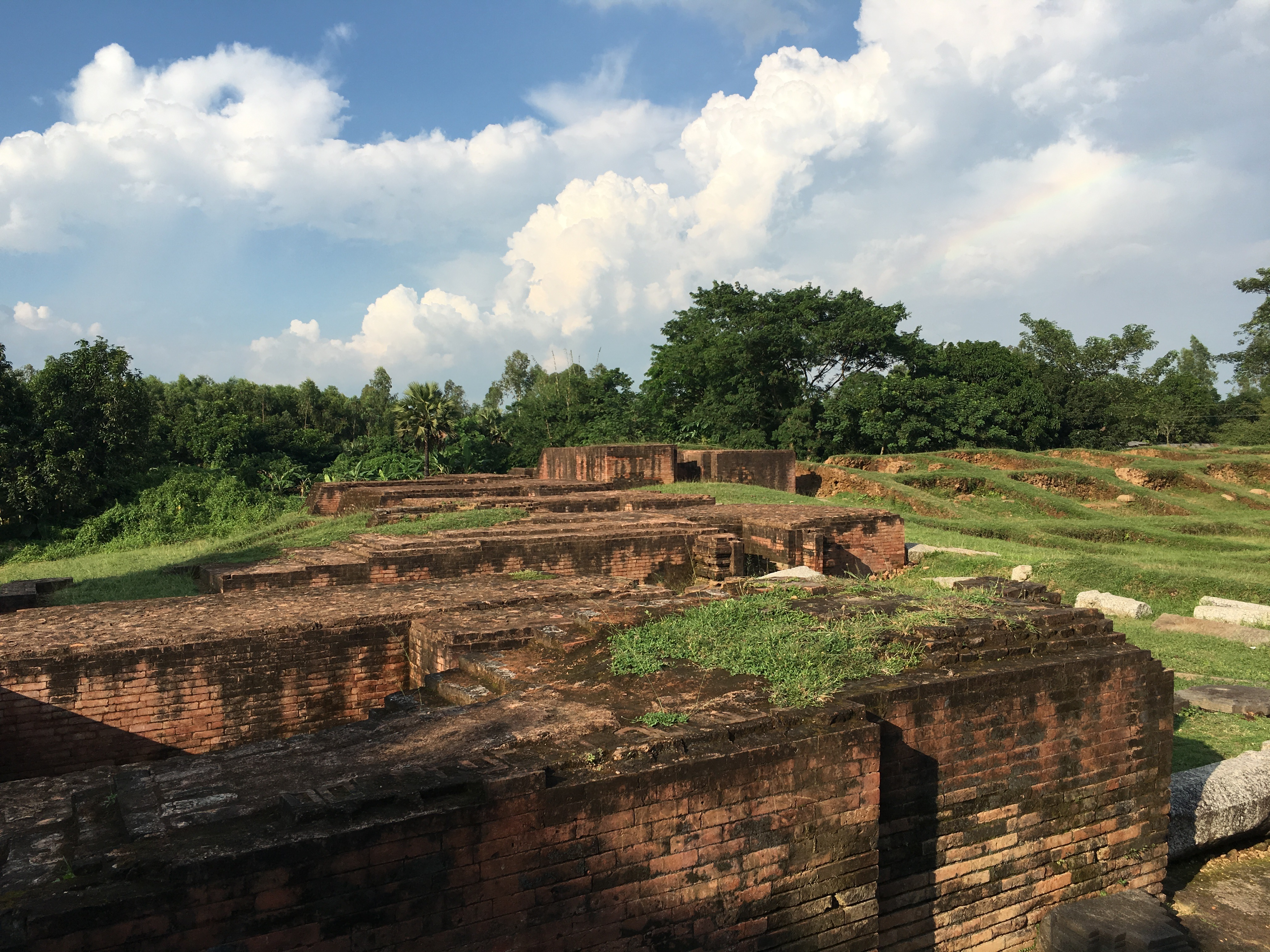
- Jagaddala Mahavihara

- Coordinates: 25°8.7′N 88°51.7′E
- Country: Bangladesh
- Division: Rajshahi
- District: Naogaon

Area
  - Total: 300.79 km^{2} (116.14 sq mi)

Population (2022)
  - Total: 194,181
  - Density: 645.57/km^{2} (1,672.0/sq mi)
- Time zone: UTC+6 (BST)
- Postal code: 6580
- Website: dhamoirhat.naogaon.gov.bd

Dhamoirhat Upazila mauza geocode map

Dhamoirhat Upazila (Bengali: ধামইরহাট উপজেলা) is an upazila of Naogaon District in the Division of Rajshahi, Bangladesh. The main river of the Dhamoirhat Upazila is the Atrai.

== History ==
During the War of Liberation, the Pakistan army had camped at places like Farsipara, Pagla Dewan, Rangamati, etc. A direct encounter between the Pak army and the freedom fighters were held at Piral Danga, Gangra, Kulfatpur and Rangamati with the heavy casualty on both sides. The Pakistan army burnt and sacked the village Kulfatpur and killed 14 innocent villagers. Marks of War of Liberation Mass grave: 2 (Farsipara, Pagla Dewan).

== Geography ==
Map of Naogaon District

Dhamoirhat is located at 25.1444°N 88.8611°E. It has 29661 households and total area 300.79 km^{2}.

Dhamoirhat Upazila is bounded by Balurghat and Tapan CD Blocks in Dakshin Dinajpur district, West Bengal, India, on the north, Joypurhat Sadar Upazila on the east, Badalgachhi and Patnitala Upazilas on the south and Patnitala Upazila on the west.

=== Climate ===
Dhamoirhat is placed in a monsoon area. In the summer, temp. is about 40 degree & in the rainy season(June–July) raindrops as well.

== Demographics ==
Religions in Dhamoirhat Upazila (2022)
Religion	Percent
Islam	87.21%
Hinduism	7.68%
Christianity	3.41%
Other or not stated	1.68%

According to the 2022 Bangladeshi census, Dhamoirhat Upazila had 54,689 households and a population of 194,181. 7.58% of the population were under 5 years of age. Dhamoirhat had a literacy rate (age 7 and over) of 72.95%: 74.32% for males and 71.57% for females, and a sex ratio of 100.32 males for every 100 females. 23,999 (12.36%) lived in urban areas.

According to the 2011 Census of Bangladesh, Dhamoirhat Upazila had 49,046 households and a population of 184,778. 34,781 (18.82%) were under 10 years of age. Dhamoirhat had a literacy rate (age 7 and over) of 50.09%, compared to the national average of 51.8%, and a sex ratio of 975 females per 1000 males. 17,817 (9.64%) lived in urban areas. According to the 2022 census, total population was 194,181. Ethnic population was 12,156( 6.26%) in which Santal people was 4,834, Munda people was 2,392 and Oraon people was 1,800 .

Population of upazila by ethnicity (2022)
1. Bengali (93.7%)
2. Santal (2.49%)
3. Munda (1.23%)
4. Oraon (0.93%)
5. Others (1.61%)

== Economy and services ==
Main occupations is Agriculture 51.65%, agricultural labourer 33.01%, wage labourer 1.99%, service 2.63%, commerce 4.76%, others 5.96%.Land use Total cultivable land 42425 hectares, fallow land 390 hectares; single crop 39%, double crop 37% and treble crop land 24%. Land under irrigation 42%. Land control Among the peasants 12% are rich, 23% medium, 22% marginal, 24% landless, and 19% small; cultivable land per head 0.28 hectare. Value of land The market of value of land of first grade is Tk 5000 per 0.01 hectare. Main crops Paddy, wheat, jute, brinjal, potato, mustard seed, pulse, onion, garlic, tamarind, til, carrot, cauliflower. Extinct or nearly crops Local variety of paddy, kaun, linseed, pulse, jab, bajra.

Main fruits: Mango, blackberry, jackfruit, banana, litchi, papaya, guava, and watermelon.

Dairies, poultry and fisheries: Dairy 3, poultry 33, fishery 21, hatchery1.

Communications facilities: Roads- Pucca 70 km, mud road 322 km. Traditional transport Palanquin, dhuli, horse carriage, bullock cart. These means of transport are nearly extinct.

Manufactures: Biscuit factory 6, ice factory 6.

Cottage industries: Bamboo work 42, potteries 60, sewing machine 305, welding work 32, iron smith 12, Goldsmith 25. Hat, bazar and fairs. The total number of hats and bazar 25; fairs 9, most noted of which is Madarer Mela at Sankarpur. Main exports Banana, brinjal, tamarind, watermelon.

Health centres: Upazila health complex 1, Christian mission hospital 1, satellite clinic 3, family welfare centres 5.

== Points of interest ==
- Jagaddala Mahavihara
- The extraordinary long tomb of Muhammad Shiran Khilji, the second Muslim ruler of Bengal, located in Mahisantosh.
- Altadighi National Park
- Vimer Panti
- Mahishontosh Mazar
- Agrapuri Vihara (Agradigun Dhibi)
- Pagla Dewan Mazar

== Administration ==
Dhamoirhat, now an upazila, was established in 1922.

Dhamoirhat Upazila is divided into Dhamoirhat Municipality and eight union parishads: Agradigun, Alampur, Aranagar, Dhamoirhat, Isabpur, Jahanpur, Khelna, and Omar. The union parishads are subdivided into 212 mauzas and 243 villages.

- Mayor of Municipality: Md. Aminul Islam
- Chairman of Upazila council: Azar Uddin
- Vice chairman of Upazila council: Md. Sohel Rana
- Female Vice Chairman of Upazila council: Mrs. Farah Diba

== Education ==
The average literacy rate of Dhamoirhat Upazila is 28.4%; where male includes 34% & female 22.2%.

Educational Institutions: College 11, High School 29, Madrasa (Non-Govt ) 37, Government primary school 64, Non-Government primary school 29, Satellite school 4, Kindergarten 1, Mission school 1, Vocational institutions 1, orphanage 4.

=== College ===
- Dhamoirhat M. M. Government College
- Dhamoirhat Mohila College
- Shohid Zia Technical College
- Alhaz Zahangir Alam Memorial College
- Jogdal Adibasi School & College
- Poranagar Model College
- Agradigun College

=== Schools and madrasas ===
- Chalkmoiram Govt. Model High School
- Jahanpur Govt. Primary School
- Shankarpur High School
- Lakshmanpara High School
- Chalkmoiram Govt. Primary School.
- Raghunathpur Kamil Madrasah
- Pagol Dewan Siddiquea Fazil Madrasah
- Durgapur-Basudebpur Alim Madrasha
- Chandipur High School
- Chandipur Govt. Primary School
- Arnagar Bi-Lateral high School
- Aranagar Primary School
- Rangamati High School
- Rangamati Primary School
- Rangamati Hi -Ul-Ulom Hafijia Madrasa & Orphanage
- Varom High School
- Varom Primary School
- Isabpur High School
- Dhamoirhat Girls School
- Agradigun High School
- Agradigun Girls High School
- Moheshpur Primary School
- Dhamoirhat Shofia High School
- Bostabor Dakhil Madrasah
- Dhamoirhat Fazil Degree Madrasha
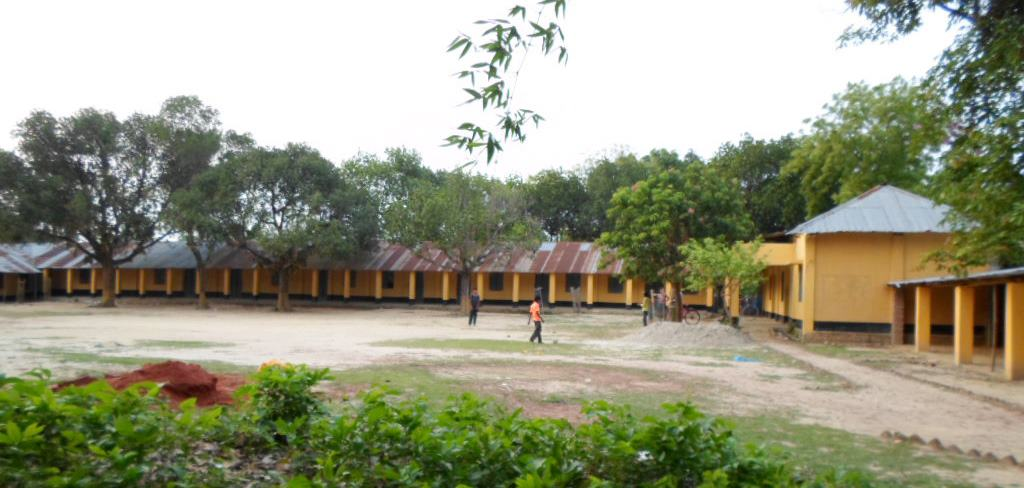

== Notable people ==
- Muzaffar Rahman Chowdhury, former Member of the National Assembly of Pakistan
- Shahiduzzaman Sarker (b. 1955), former Whip of Treasury Bench of the Government of Bangladesh
- Muhammad Shiran Khalji (d. 1208), second Governor of Bengal

== See also ==
- Upazilas of Bangladesh
- Districts of Bangladesh
- Divisions of Bangladesh
