= Chandipur High School =

Chandipur High school, Dhamoirhat
- চন্ডিপুর উচ্চ বিদ্যালয়

Location
- Dhamoirhat Upazila, Naogaon, Rajshahi; Bangladesh
- Coordinates: 25.193°N 88.842°E

Information
- Type: Public
- Motto: জ্ঞানই শক্তি (Knowledge is power)
- Established: 1969
- Headmaster: MD. Mukul Hossen
- Staff: 4
- Faculty: 15
- Enrollment: 300

Chandipur High School is a public educational institution located at Chandipur village of Dhamoirhat Upazila based in Naogaon District, Bangladesh. It was established in 1969 and currently serves more than 300 students. It is situated at the northern part of Dhamoirhat Upazila.

It is a two-storied building which is used for administrative and academic purposes. It includes a library with more than 1000 books.

Chandipur Government Primary School is also located in front of Chandipur High School, after established in 1930, it was nationalized in 1991 by Bangladesh Government.
