= Ladahachandra =

Ruler of the Chandra dynasty in Bengal

- Reign: 1000 – 1020 CE
- Predecessor: Kalyanachandra
- Successor: Govindachandra
- Issue: Govindachandra
- House: Chandra
- Dynasty: Chandra
- Father: Kalyanachandra
- Religion: Buddhism

Ladahachandra was the fourth ruler of the Chandra dynasty in eastern Bengal. Although he was a Buddhist and a renowned patron of Buddhism, he was also very sympathetic to Vaishnavite teachings (according to the two copperplates discovered at Mainamati).

Preceded by Kalyanachandra	Chandra King; 1000 – 1020 CE	Succeeded by Govindachandra
