= Dwijen Sharma =

- দ্বিজেন শর্মা
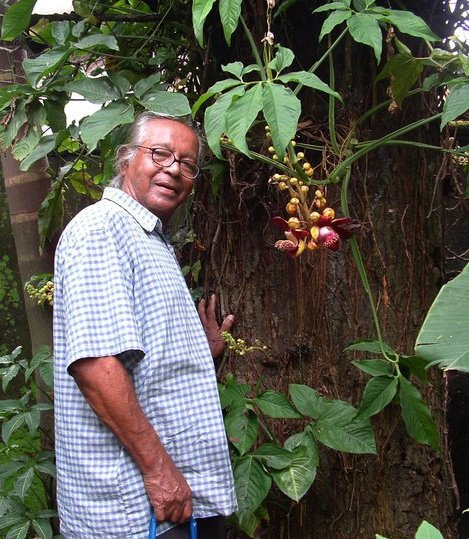
- Sharma in 2008
- Born: 29 May 1929; Shimulia, Barlekha, Moulvibazar, Bengal Presidency, British India (present-day Bangladesh)
- Died: 15 September 2017 (aged 88); Dhaka, Bangladesh
- Education: City College, Kolkata; University of Dhaka
- Known for: Nature Conservation, science writer
- Awards: Bangla Academy Literary Award; Ekushey Padak
- Scientific career
- Fields: Nature Conservation, Botany
- Workplaces: Brojomohun College Barisal; Notre Dame College, Dhaka

Dwijen Sharma (29 May 1929 – 15 September 2017) was a Bangladeshi naturalist and science writer. He was awarded Bangla Academy Literary Award in 1987 and Ekushey Padak in 2015 by the Government of Bangladesh for his contribution in language and literature.

== Early life ==
Sharma was born in Shimulia village of Barlekha Upazila of Moulvibazar District in Sylhet Division. His father Chandrakand Sharma was a "Kobiraj" or rural doctor and his mother Mognomoyi Debi was a social worker. During his childhood, he was fond of visiting the forest of Patharia hill which is situated in Barlekha Upazila.

== Education and professional work ==
Sharma received his bachelor's degree from City College, Kolkata. He earned his master's degree in botany in 1958 from the University of Dhaka. He then joined Brojomohun College, Barisal. In 1962 he left Barisal to join the faculty of Notre Dame College, Dhaka and worked until 1974. Then, he moved to Moscow to work for Progress Publishers as a translator.

He moved back to Bangladesh in 2000 and joined Banglapedia (National Encyclopedia Of Bangladesh) Project, Asiatic Society of Bangladesh as an editor and translator of biology. He served as vice president of Asiatic Society for 3 years. An encyclopedia of the flora and fauna of Bangladesh in 56 volumes was published by the Asiatic Society of Bangladesh while he was the president of the publishing committee.

== Honors and awards ==
- Kudrat-i-Khuda Gold medal
- Bangla Academy Literary Award (1987)
- Nature Preservation Award by Channel i (2011)
- M Nurul Qader Children's Literature Award
- Ekushey Padak (2015)

== Personal life ==
Sharma was married to Devi Sharma, a former professor at Central Women's University. They have one son and one daughter. Sharma's niece Manisha Chakraborty is a Bangladeshi politician.

== Books ==
Sharma wrote more than 30 books. Some notable ones are as follows.

- Shamoli Nishorgo (Green Nature)
- Shomajtontre Boshobash (Living in Socialism)
- Jiboner Shesh Nei (No End To Life)
- Phoolgulo Jeno Kotha (Each Flower Is A Word)
- Biggan Shikkha O Daiboddhotar Nirikh ( Science Education and Our Responsibilities)
- Nishorgo Nirman O Nandonik Bhabna (Building the Environment and Related Thoughts)
