= Traillokyachandra =

Ruler of Chandra dynasty

- Reign: 900–930
- Predecessor: Founder of dynasty
- Successor: Srichandra
- Issue: Srichandra
- House: Mainamati
- Dynasty: Chandra
- Father: Subarnachandra
- Religion: Hindu later Buddhism Follower

Traillokyachandra (reigned c. 900 – 930) was the first ruler of the Chandra dynasty in eastern Bengal. His father, Subarnachandra, was a vassal to the earlier rulers of the Harikela. Traillokyachandra established the dynasty, centered at Devaparvata (near Mainamati, Comilla) and expanded into modern Barisal division before declaring himself as Maharajadhiraja.

| Preceded by unknown ruler of Harikela | Candra King; 900 - 930 CE | Succeeded by Srichandra |
