= Śākyaśribhadra =

Indian Buddhist monk

Śākyaśrībhadra

Personal life
- Born: c. 1127 CE Kashmir
- Died: c. 1225 CE Kashmir
- Education: Nalanda; Vikramashila

Religious life
- Religion: Buddhism

Senior posting
- Students: Sakya Pandita

Śākyaśrībhadra (1127–1225 CE), also known as Śākyaśrī, was a Kashmiri Buddhist monk and scholar who served as abbot of the monasteries of Nalanda and Vikramashila. He was the last abbot of Vikramashila prior to its destruction in the 13th century.

In addition to these positions he held, he also played an important role in the dissemination of the Sakya school in Tibet.

== Biography ==
There are conflicting opinions regarding the year of Śākyaśrībhadra's birth with some sources saying 1127 CE and others pointing to a period around the 1140s. However, these sources agree that he was born in a location called Daśobharā in modern-day Kashmir. He is also mentioned as having a brother called Buddhacandra.

His education began at the age of 10 when he began to study grammar under a Brahmin named Lakṣmīdhara. By the age of 23, he was ordained as a Buddhist monk and given the monastic name of Subhadra. When he was 30, he travelled to the region of Magadha in modern-day Bihar after receiving invitations from multiple monks including Ṥāntākaragupta, Daśabala, and Dhavaraka. Śākyaśrībhadra rose through the monastic ranks and eventually became the abbot of Nalanda monastery. After this, he also served as the abbot of the nearby monastery of Vikramashila. Notably, he was also the last abbot of Vikramashila and witnessed its destruction at the hands of invading Muslim troops at some time around 1193.

Following this event, Śākyaśrībhadra fled with his followers to Jagaddala Mahavihara in Bengal where he stayed for three years. However due to the declining situation, Śākyaśrībhadra declared that Buddhism had been "destroyed" in India and left for Tibet by travelling through Nepal. Śākyaśrībhadra first arrived in Tibet in 1204 and was accompanied by various other Indian pandits. He is also said to have brought with him relics of the Buddha that were passed on to him by a Sri Lankan arhat. His time in Tibet was productive and he interacted with the local monks, notably Sakya Pandita whom he first met in 1204 and met on multiple occasions afterwards. In 1208 he served as the upadhyaya in his ordination ceremony and in 1210 he gave him teachings on the Kalachakra and poetry among other topics.

At some point, Śākyaśrībhadra left Tibet and returned to his native Kashmir where he continued to teach Buddhism and repair temples. Per traditional sources, he died at the age of 99 in 1225.
