= Ebadot Hossain =

Bangladeshi cricketer

Ebadot Hossain Chowdhury
Personal information
- Full name: Ebadot Hossain Chowdhury
- Born: 7 January 1994 (age 32); Barlekha, Moulvibazar, Bangladesh
- Nickname: Sylhet Rocket
- Batting: Right handed
- Bowling: Right-arm fast
- Role: Bowler

International information
- National side: Bangladesh (2019–present)
- Test debut (cap 95): 28 February 2019 v New Zealand
- Last Test: 14 June 2023 v Afghanistan
- ODI debut (cap 139): 10 August 2022 v Zimbabwe
- Last ODI: 23 March 2023 v Ireland
- ODI shirt no.: 58
- T20I debut (cap 77): 1 September 2022 v Sri Lanka
- Last T20I: 6 November 2022 v Pakistan
- T20I shirt no.: 58

Career statistics
| Competition | Test | ODI | FC | LA |
|---|---|---|---|---|
| Matches | 17 | 6 | 47 | 19 |
| Runs scored | 33 | 0 | 127 | 26 |
| Batting average | 2.53 | – | 3.17 | 3.71 |
| 100s/50s | 0/0 | 0/0 | 0/0 | 0/0 |
| Top score | 21* | 0* | 21* | 11 |
| Balls bowled | 2,927 | 158 | 7,669 | 905 |
| Wickets | 31 | 17 | 127 | 27 |
| Bowling average | 56.45 | 14.44 | 33.07 | 29.66 |
| 5 wickets in innings | 1 | 0 | 4 | 0 |
| 10 wickets in match | 0 | 0 | 1 | 0 |
| Best bowling | 6/46 | 4/47 | 6/46 | 4/46 |
| Catches/stumpings | 1/– | 1/– | 9/– | 1/– |
- Source: ESPNcricinfo, 11 March 2023
- Military career
- Allegiance: Bangladesh
- Branch: Bangladesh Air Force
- Service years: 2012–2016
- Rank: Aircraftman

Ebadot Hossain Chowdhury (Bengali: এবাদত হোসেন চৌধুরী; born 7 January 1994), better known as simply Ebadot Hossain, nicknamed 'Sylhet Rocket' due to his speed and skill, is a Bangladeshi cricketer. He made his international debut for the Bangladesh cricket team in February 2019. He is also an active soldier of the Bangladesh Air Force; he is one of two international cricketers who are also active soldiers, along with Sheldon Cottrell of the West Indies.

== Early life ==
Ebadot Hossain Chowdhury was born on 7 January 1994 in the village of Kathaltali in Barlekha, Moulvibazar District. He was the second of the six children of Nizamuddin Chowdhury and Samia Begum.

In 2012, Ebadot Hossain joined the Bangladesh Air Force as a volleyball player. In 2016, he attended a pacer hunt competition conducted by BCB under Aaqib Javed's supervision. Ebadot was picked by Aaqib for BCB's High-Performance program. And thus, Ebadot became a cricketer from a volleyball player.

== Domestic career ==
Ebadot made his first-class debut for Sylhet Division in the 2016–17 National Cricket League on 25 September 2016. Ebadot made his List A debut for Mohammedan Sporting Club in the 2016–17 Dhaka Premier Division Cricket League on 8 May 2017. He made his Twenty20 debut for Rangpur Riders on 6 November 2017 in the 2017–18 Bangladesh Premier League. Ebadot was the leading wicket-taker for Central Zone in the 2017–18 Bangladesh Cricket League, with thirteen dismissals in six matches.

In October 2018, Ebadot was named in the squad for the Sylhet Sixers team, following the draft for the 2018–19 Bangladesh Premier League. The following month, bowling for North Zone in the 2018–19 Bangladesh Cricket League, he took his maiden ten-wicket match haul in first-class cricket. In August 2019, he was one of 35 cricketers named in a training camp ahead of Bangladesh's 2019–20 season.

== International career ==
In November 2016, Ebadot was named in a 22-man preparatory squad to train in Australia, ahead of Bangladesh's tour to New Zealand.

In February 2019, Ebadot was added to Bangladesh's Test squad for their series against New Zealand. He made his Test debut for Bangladesh against New Zealand on 28 February 2019, and his first test wicket was Neil Wagner.

In January 2022, he took his first five-wicket haul in Test cricket, against New Zealand at Bay Oval in the first Test of the series. He ended up with the figure 6/46, which helped Bangladesh to achieve their first win against New Zealand in their home across formats in 33 encounters and their first Test win against New Zealand. He was named the Man of the Match for picking up seven wickets in the match.

In February 2022, he was named in Bangladesh's One Day International (ODI) squad for their series against Afghanistan. In March 2022, he was named in Bangladesh's ODI squad for their series against South Africa. In May 2022, he was again named in Bangladesh's ODI squad, this time for their series against the West Indies. In August 2022, he was named in Bangladesh's ODI squad for their tour of Zimbabwe. He made his ODI debut on 10 August 2022, for Bangladesh against Zimbabwe. Later the same month, he was named in Bangladesh's T20I squad for the 2022 Asia Cup. He made his T20I debut on 1 September 2022, against Sri Lanka.
