= Md. Shahab Uddin =

Bangladeshi politician

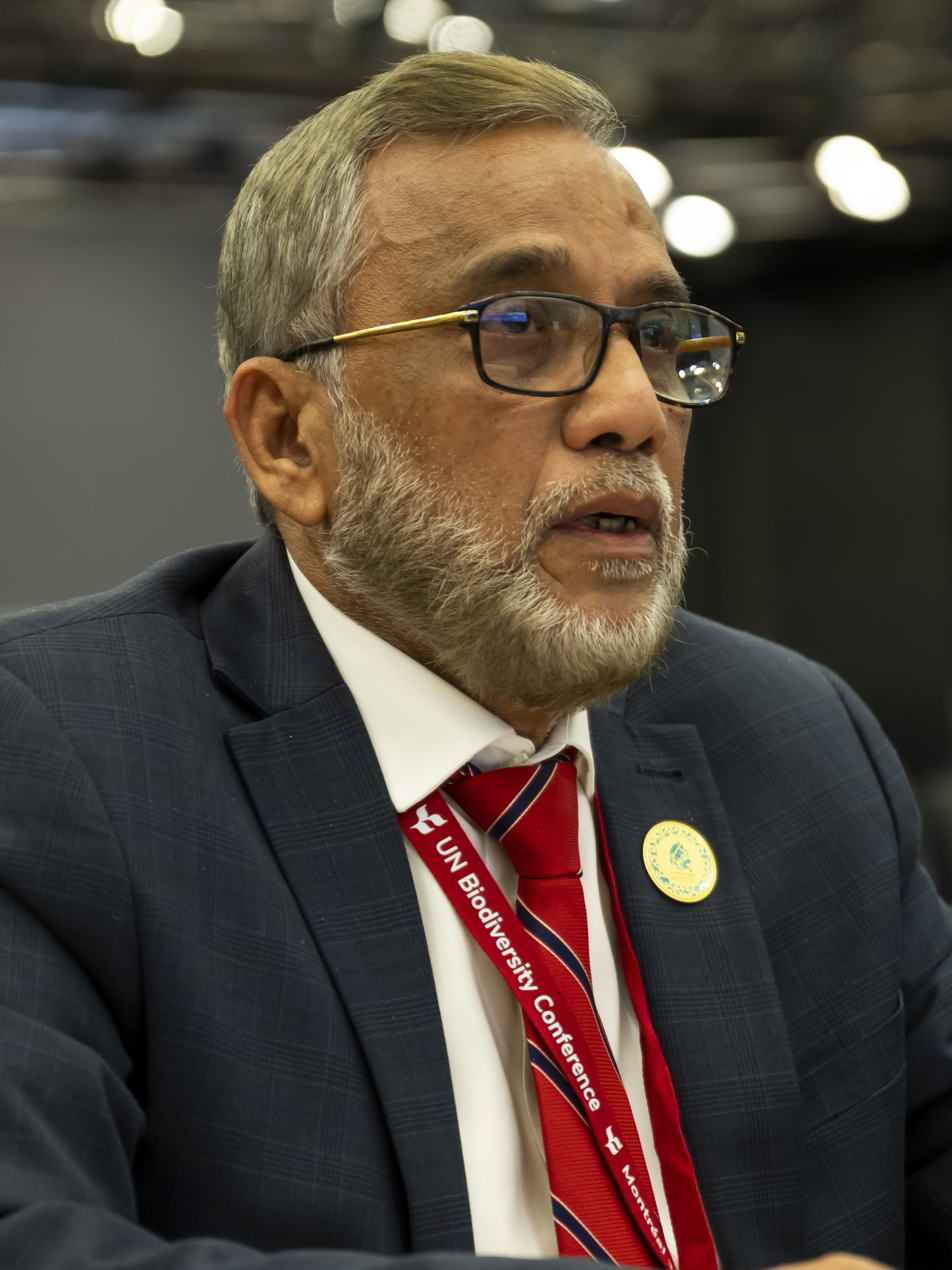
- Uddin at COP15 in Montreal (2022)

Minister of Environment, Forest and Climate Change
- In office 7 January 2019 – 11 January 2024
- Preceded by: Anisul Islam Mahmud
- Succeeded by: Saber Hossain Chowdhury

Member of Parliament for Moulvibazar-1
- In office 25 January 2009 – 6 August 2024
- Preceded by: Ebadur Rahman Chowdhury
- In office 14 July 1996 – 13 July 2001
- Preceded by: Ebadur Rahman Chowdhury

Whip of Bangladesh Parliament
- In office January 2019 – December 2023

Personal details
- Born: 31 December 1954 (age 71) Barlekha, East Bengal, Dominion of Pakistan
- Party: Bangladesh Awami League

Md. Shahab Uddin (born 31 December 1954) is a Bangladesh Awami League politician. He is a former member of Jatiya Sangsad representing the Moulvibazar-1 constituency. He was the Minister of Environment, Forest and Climate Change in the Bangladesh Government.

== Career ==
Shahab Uddin was elected to the parliament on 5 January 2014 from Moulvibazar-1 as a Bangladesh Awami League candidate. He is also the whip of the parliament.
