= Muhammad Sirajul Islam =

Bangladeshi politician (1943–2020)

Md. Sirajul Islam
- সিরাজুল ইসলাম

Member of Parliament from Sylhet-12 (present Maulvibazar-1)
- In office 1973–1982
- Preceded by: New constituency (Independence)
- Succeeded by: Imam Uddin Ahmed

Personal details
- Born: 28 February 1943 Barlekha, Moulvibazar, Sylhet,
- Died: 4 April 2020 Queens, New York, U.S.
- Cause of death: Natural death
- Party: Bangladesh Awami League
- Children: 5

Md. Sirajul Islam (28 February 1943 – 4 April 2020) was a Bangladesh Awami League politician. He was elected a member of parliament from Sylhet-12 (present Maulvibazar-1) in 1973 and 1979. He was an organizer of the Liberation War of Bangladesh.

== Career ==
Sirajul Islam was founder and general secretary of the Sylhet district Chhatra League from 1963 to 1964.

== Death ==
Sirajul Islam died of COVID-19 on 4 April 2020, while undergoing treatment at Elmhurst Hospital Center in Queens, New York City.
