= Chandra dynasty =

Indian dynasty of Bengal region (370–1050)

- 370–1050
- Status: Empire
- Religion: Hinduism, Buddhism
- Government: Monarchy
- History
  - Established: 370
  - Disestablished: 1050
Preceded by	Succeeded by
Annaveta dynasty	Pala Empire
- Today part of: Bangladesh, Myanmar, India

The Chandra dynasty was a Buddhist dynasty, originating from the South-east Bengal region of Indian subcontinent, which ruled the Samatata area of Bengal, as well as parts of Arakan Later it was a neighbour to the Pala Empire to the north. Rulers of Chandra kingdom were adherents of Buddhism. The Kings of Chandra dynasty were identified as the kings of Vangaladesha in the Tirumulai inscription of Chola dynasty. The dynasty was founded around the 4th century AD.

== History ==
The Anandachandra Inscription (729 AD) mentions that the Chandra dynasty was established by Dvenchandra (or Mahataing Chandra) in 370 AD. He had assumed the throne after the end of the Annaveta dynasty. The ye Dhamma inscriptions of the Queen of Niti Chandra are dated to early 6th century AD based on paleographic grounds.

The Chandra kingdom was one of the last Buddhist strongholds in the Indian subcontinent. The kingdom flourished as a center of the Tantric schools of Buddhism. It played a role in the diffusion of Mahayana Buddhism to Southeast Asia.

During the reign of Srichandra (c 930–975 AD), the administrative centre of the Chandra kingdom was established in Bikrampur in Vanga. He led invasions into Kamarupa. The Chandras played an important role in the regional politics and military history of erstwhile Bengal.

In the reign of King Govindachandra, the Chandras were eventually annexed by the Pala dynasty of Varendra.

== Conquest of Kamarupa ==
Verse 12 of the Sylhet plate informs us that Sricandra conquered Kamrupa. The description of the land of Kmarupa with its pigeons, monkeys, plantain tress, deers and black aloe-woods, as given in the verse, shows us that the composer was familiar with the country.

The next verse indicates that his victorious army went beyond the Lohitya(Brahmaputra) river to the north of Gauhati, where flows the puspabhadra river and proceeded through Uttarapatha to the mountainous region.

== Maritime relations ==
The coastal kingdom had trade networks with states in what is now Myanmar, Thailand, Indonesia and Vietnam. 10th century shipwrecks around the coast of Java provide evidence of maritime links between southeastern Bengal and Southeast Asia. Bronze sculptures may have been imported by the Javanese from the Chandra kingdom in southeastern Bengal. Arab merchants also traded with the kingdom.

King Anandachandra mentions mission he sent to Sinhalese King Silamegha (Aggabodhi IV) (727–766)

== Marital relations ==
According to king Anandachandra's (22nd King of this dynasty) inscription, the Chandra dynasty had marital relations with the Tamralipta royal family (Tamluk Royal Family). The Bengali King Anandachandra of Arakan was married to Princess Dhenda of Tamralipta.

== Archaeology ==
There are numerous inscriptions dating from the period of the Chandra dynasty. The three archaeological sites associated with the dynasty include Bikrampur and Mainamati in Bangladesh and Waithali in Rakhine State, Myanmar.

== Education ==
Chandrapur University in Shrihatta was as large as other religious institutions like Nalanda, Taxila, Mahasthangarh or Odantapuri and was established before Oxford, and Cambridge universities or even the Jagaddala Vihara. It was made by king Srichandra. Its exact location has not been found. Chandrapur university was unique in contrast with other universities and the viharas established by Buddhist kings in India. Its curriculum included almost all of the subjects from the Hindu Shastra except the grammar of Chandragomin who was Buddhist by religion. Moreover, the students of this university were also Hindu Brahmins. The nine monasteries were overseen mainly by Hindu Brahmins. This is because the Buddhist king, Srichandra, granted lands in Paschimbhag in the name of Buddha for nine Brahmin monasteries where the Chaturvedas were mainly taught. Kamalakanta Gupta referred to this grant as "unique among other Buddhist kings" since it implies Srichandra's favouritism towards Brahmins.

Land distribution among 25 classes of people, guests, and students indicates an efficient administration in the universities. According to Zafir Setu, this administrative arrangement is more consistent with the present-day university system.

== List of Chandra rulers ==
#	King	Period	Reign (CE)
Ruling from Dhanyawadi and Waithali
1	Dvenchandra	55	370–425
2	Rajachandra	20	425–445
3	Kalachandra	9	445–454
4	Devachandra	22	454-476
5	Yajnachandra	7	476-483
6	Chandrabandu	6	483-489
7	Bhumichandra	7	489–496
8	Bhutichandra	24	496–520
9	Nitichandra	55	520–575
7	Virachandra	3	575–578
11	Pritichandra	12	578-90
12	Prithvichandra	7	590–597
13	Dhirtichandra	3	597–600
14	Mahavira*	12	600-12
15	Virayajap*	12	612-24
16	Sevinren*	12	624-36
17	Dharmasura*	13	636-49
18	Vajrashakti*	16	649-65
19	Dharmavijaya*	36	665–701
20	Narendravijaya*	2 yr 9 months	701–703
21	Dharmachandra*	16	703–720
22	Anandachandra*	9+	720-729+
Ruling from Harikela
1	Traillokyachandra	30	900–930
2	Srichandra	45	930–975
3	Kalyanachandra	25	975–1000
4	Ladahachandra	20	1000–1020
5	Govindachandra	30	1020–1050

*Note- These rulers may or may not be related to the Chandra dynasty.
