= Moulvibazar-1 =

Constituency of Bangladesh's Jatiya Sangsad

Coordinates: 24.70°N 92.19°E

- Constituency for the Jatiya Sangsad
- District: Moulvibazar District
- Division: Sylhet Division
- Electorate: 265,809 (2018)

Current constituency
- Created: 1984
- Party: Bangladesh Nationalist Party
- Member: Nasir Uddin Ahmed Mithu
- ← 234 Sylhet-6 236 Moulvibazar-2 →

Moulvibazar-1 is a constituency represented in the Jatiya Sangsad (National Parliament) of Bangladesh since 2026 by Nasir Uddin Ahmed Mithu of the Bangladesh Nationalist Party.

== Boundaries ==
The constituency encompasses Barlekha and Juri upazilas.

== History ==
The constituency was created in 1984 from a Sylhet constituency when the former Sylhet District was split into four districts: Sunamganj, Sylhet, Moulvibazar, and Habiganj.

Ahead of the 2008 general election, the Election Commission redrew constituency boundaries to reflect population changes revealed by the 2001 Bangladesh census. The 2008 redistricting altered the boundaries of the constituency.

Election	Member	Party
1986	Md. Iman Uddin Ahmed	Awami League
1988	Ebadur Rahman Chowdhury	Jatiya Party
1996	Md. Shahab Uddin	Awami League
2001	Ebadur Rahman Chowdhury	Bangladesh Nationalist Party
2008	Md. Shahab Uddin	Awami League
2026	Nasir Uddin Ahmed Mithu	Bangladesh Nationalist Party

== Elections ==
=== Elections in the 2010s ===
General Election 2014: Moulvibazar-1
Party	Candidate	Votes	%	±%
AL	Md. Shahab Uddin	104,020	91.5	+31.2
JP(E)	Ahmed Riyaj Uddin	9,649	8.5	N/A
Majority		94,371	83.0	+62.1
Turnout		113,669	48.9	−38.1
AL hold				

=== Elections in the 2000s ===
General Election 2008: Moulvibazar-1
Party	Candidate	Votes	%	±%
AL	Md. Shahab Uddin	106,570	60.3	+14.4
BNP	Ebadur Rahman Chowdhury	69,609	39.4	−8.2
Independent	Md. Anwarul Islam	561	0.3	N/A
Majority		36,961	20.9	+19.2
Turnout		176,740	87.0	+6.6
AL gain from BNP				

General Election 2001: Moulvibazar-1
Party	Candidate	Votes	%	±%
BNP	Ebadur Rahman Chowdhury	49,281	47.6	+23.7
AL	Md. Shahab Uddin	47,539	45.9	+6.3
IJOF	Makhaddas Ali	16,767	14.7	N/A
Majority		1,742	1.7	−14.0
Turnout		113,587	87.7	+2.4
BNP gain from AL				

=== Elections in the 1990s ===
General Election June 1996: Moulvibazar-1
Party	Candidate	Votes	%	±%
AL	Md. Shahab Uddin	33,179	39.6	+1.9
BNP	Ebadur Rahman Chowdhury	20,047	23.9	+8.5
JP(E)	Masuk Ahmed Chowdhury	15,335	18.3	−19.9
Jamaat	Abdul Malik	8,958	10.7	+2.1
Sammilita Sangram Parishad	Md. Musamuddin Chowdhury	5,994	7.2	N/A
Independent	Abdul Shahid	162	0.2	N/A
Bangladesh Muslim League (Jamir Ali)	ANM Yusuf	82	0.1	N/A
Majority		13,132	15.7	+15.2
Turnout		83,757	78.0	+17.4
AL gain from JP(E)				

General Election 1991: Moulvibazar-1
Party	Candidate	Votes	%	±%
JP(E)	Ebadur Rahman Chowdhury	27,900	38.2	
AL	Iman Uddin Ahmed	27,558	37.7	
BNP	Asad Uddin	11,230	15.4	
Jamaat	Abdul Malik	6,256	8.6	
Ganatantri Party	Tobarak Hossain	108	0.1	
Majority		342	0.5	
Turnout		73,052	60.6	
JP(E) hold				
