= Ebadur Rahman Chowdhury =

Bangladeshi politician (1947–2023)

- এবাদুর রহমান চৌধুরী

State Minister of Disaster Management and Relief
- In office 10 October 2001 – 23 May 2003
- Succeeded by: Position abolished

Member of the Bangladesh Parliament for Moulvibazar-1
- In office 28 October 2001 – 27 October 2006
- Preceded by: Md. Shahab Uddin
- Succeeded by: Md. Shahab Uddin
- In office 15 April 1988 – 30 March 1996
- Preceded by: Imam Uddin Ahmed

Personal details
- Born: 18 February 1947 Moulvibazar District, Sylhet Division, Assam Province, British India
- Died: 6 September 2023 (aged 76) Dhaka, Bangladesh
- Party: Jatiya Party (Ershad); Bangladesh Nationalist Party
- Children: Jahrat Adib Chowdhury

Ebadur Rahman Chowdhury (18 February 1947 – 6 September 2023) was a Bangladesh Nationalist Party politician and a Jatiya Sangsad member representing the Moulvibazar-1 constituency. He also served as State Minister of Disaster Management and Relief from 2001 to 2003.

== Life and career ==
Ebadur Rahman Chowdhury was born in Moulvibazar District, Sylhet Division, Assam Province, British India on 18 February 1947. He was elected to parliament from Moulvibazar-1 as a Bangladesh Nationalist Party candidate in 2001. He died on 6 September 2023, at the age of 76.
