= Kamboja Pala dynasty =

Historical dynasty ruling parts of Bengal in the 10th-11th centuries

The Kamboja-Pala dynasty ruled parts of Bengal in the 10th to 11th centuries CE, after invading the Pala Empire during the reign of Gopala III. The last Kamboja-Pala ruler Dharmapala was defeated by the south Indian emperor Rajendra I of the Chola dynasty in the 11th century.

== Origins ==
The dynasty came into power in the 10th century, conquering north-west Bengal. Previously it was believed that it was a result of large-scale invasion by northwestern Kambojas, but R. C. Majumdar rejects this theory after citing the Irda copper plate grant, and states that, "The theory of a Kamboja invasion is not supported by any positive evidence, and appears to be highly improbable." He further says that nothing is known about its origins with certainty, although he suggests that the founder of the dynasty, Rajyapala may have been same as Rajyapala, the Pala emperor, Kamboja being his maternal lineage. He further mentions other speculations that Tibetan sources name an eastern tract lying between Bengal and Burma as Kam-po-tsa and this dynasty might have come from there, that it might have arrived from Cambodia, or might be related to the Kambojas of northwest. The dynasty might have declared their independence from the Pala rule, due to it being weakened by the invasions of the Kamarupa king Ratna Pala and the Chandela ruler Yashovarman.

== Sources ==
There are several ancient inscriptions which attest Kamboja rule in Bengal. The most important sources are:

=== Dinajpore Pillar Inscription ===
The Dinajpur Pillar Inscription records to a Kamboja king called the Kambojanvaya Gaudapati (i.e. lord of Gauda). The Pillar Inscription was originally established in a Śiva temple that was built by the king but removed to Bangar, about 40 miles east of Gauda, during the period of Muslim rule. During the 18th century, the Pillar was further moved to Dinajpore by maharaja Ram Nath and as a result, the inscription came to be known as Dinajpore Pillar Inscription. The Dinajpore Pillar Inscription dates to the second half of the 10th century.

=== Irda Copper Plate (Tamrapatra) ===
The Irda Copper plate (Irda Tamarapatra) is another source on the Kamboja-Pala dynasty and was discovered in 1931. It is written in Sanskrit and has 49 lines of text in ancient Bengali script. The Vamsa or the tribal identity of the rulers mentioned in the Irda Copper Plate is specifically stated to be Kamboja-Vamsha-Tilaka (i.e. Ornament of the Kamboja family or Glory of the Kamboja tribe). Like the Dinajpore Pillar Inscriptions, the Irda Copper plate is also thought to belong to the second half of tenth century. Hence the academic community believes that the Kambojanvaya Gaudapati of Dinajpore Pillar Inscriptions and the Kambojavamshatilaka Paramasaugata Maharajadhiraja parameshvara paramabhattaraka Rajyapala of Kamboja-Pala dynasty of Irda Copper Plate Inscriptions refers to the same Kamboja family. But whereas the Dinajpur Pillar inscriptions refer just to one Kamboja ruler with the appellation of "Kambojanvaya Gaudapati", the Irda Copper plate, mentions generation after generation of the Kamboja-Pala kings of Bengal i.e. Rajyapala, Narayanapala and Nayapala etc. The Kamboja-Pala kings of the Irda Copper plate had ruled north-west Bengal in the tenth or eleventh century.

=== Bangar Grant of Mahipala I ===
Bangar Charter of Mahipala I is the third very important ancient source of Kamboja rule in Bengal. The charter asserts that Mahipala had re-conquered nearly the whole of north and east Bengal "after defeating the usurpers who had seized his ancestral kingdom". The same verse has been repeated in the Aamgaachhi Charter of Vigrahapala-3. But who were the usurpers the inscription does not tell, but other evidences indicate that the rulers belonging to the Kamboja family were in possession of the north and west Bengal. Scholars believe that Mahipala's Charter alludes to the seizing of the northern parts of Bengal by Kamboja dynasty from the Gopala II or Vigrahapala II of the Pala dynasty, which the great king Mahipala I claims to have won back by the force of his arms

== Extent ==
No definite information is available on the precise geographical area of the Kamboja-Pala kingdom of Bengal. According to Irda Copper plate evidence, the Kamboja-Pala kingdom definitely comprised Varadhmana-Bhukti Mandala (modern Burdman division) and Dandabhukti Mandala within the Kamboja empire. The Dandabhukti division is believed to have comprised southern and south-western parts of Midnapore district as well as the lower parts of river Suvaranrekha in district Balasore. Evidence from Dinajpore Pillar Inscription attests that the Gauda country also formed parts of Kamboja-Pala kingdom. But as long as we do not include northern Ladha (Radha or W. Bengal) in Kamboja-Pala empire, the region does not constitute one viable political entity. Hence it appears likely that northern parts of Radha may also formed parts of Kamboja-Pala kingdom. Dr R. C. Majumdar says that Gauda and Radha both formed parts of Kamboja-Pala empire. The Kamboja power in Bengal received a severe jolt from the invasions of the Chandella king Dhanga & the Chandra king of East Bengal Kalyanachandra. This political scenario enabled the Pala king Mahipala I to re-conquer Gauda from the Kambojas. The last king of the Kambojas was Dharamapala who continued to rule Dandabhukti in the first quarter of the 11th century. The Kamboja ruler Dharamapala of Dandabhukti was defeated by the south Indian Emperor Rajendra Chola I who invaded Bengal and Bihar in the 11th century. The Capital of the Kamboja Pala kingdom is stated to be Priyangu which has not been identified yet, though some scholars tend to identify the same with an old village known as Pingvani located in Garbeta Thana.

== Known kings ==
We know the names of three Kamboja rulers of the Kamboja Pala family for sure viz. Rajyapala, Narayanapala and Nayapala. The Charter (Copper Plate Inscription) was issued by Kamboja king Nayapala wherein he and his father are given the imperial titles like Parameshevara, Paramabhattacharya and Maharajadhiraja. The Copper Plate Inscription also attests that the founder of the Kamboja Pala dynasty was king Rajyapala. He has been referred to as Kambojavamshatilaka Paramasaugata Maharajadhiraja parameshvara paramabhattAraka-Rajyapala. This proves that this line of kings belonged to the Kamboja lineage. The second king is Narayanapala who was son of Rajayapala. Narayanapala was succeeded by his younger brother Nayapala, the author of the Irda Copper plate. Dr R. C. Majumdar states that the expression Kunjarghatavarshan of the Dinajpore Pillar Inscription indicates that Kunjarghatavarshan was personal name of Kambojanvaya Gaudapati of the Dinajpore Pillar Inscription. If this is so, then this Kambojanvaya Gaudapati is the fourth known Kamboja king of Kamboja dynasty of Bengal. Some scholars however believe that the Kambojanvaya Gaudapati of the Dinajpore Pillar Inscriptions is same as Kambojavamshatilaka Rajyapala of the Irda Copper plate. This does not seem to be true since Rajyapala of the Irda Copper plate is described as devotee of Buddha (Parama-saugata) whereas Kambojanvaya Gaudapati of Dinajpore Pillar Inscriptions claims in his own inscription to be a Siva devotee. It may however be possible that Kambojanvaya Gaudapati is same as Kamboja king Nayapala of the Irda Copper plate since king Nayapala also claims to be a Saivite (Siva devotee) in the Irda Copper plate. The last known ruler of the Kamboja Pala dynasty is stated to be king Dharmapala who ruled in Dandabhukti in first quarter of the 11th century.

== Religion ==
The Kambojanvaya Gaudapati of Dinajpore Pillar Inscriptions is stated to be a builder of Siva temple and therefore was devotee of Siva. He is said to be a great bestower of the charities. Kambojavamsatilaka Rajayapala, the first king of the Irda Copper plate is referred to as Parama-saugata (devotee of Buddha). The third ruler Narayanapala Kamboja is stated to be a devotee of god Vishnu. King Nayapala Kamboja, the author of Irda Copper plate is known to have practised Siva cult. There is no information on the Kamboja ruler Dharamapala, but it appears likely that he may have also been a Vedic follower i.e. either Saivite or a Vishnu devotee. The Irda Copper plate has references to Hindu gods, high rising temple buildings as well as to the sacred smokes rising from the Yagya fires into the skies. This again alludes to the Hinduism of the Pala Kambojas. Irda Copper plate also makes special references to the Purohits, Kritivajyas, Dharmagyas and other holy officials. Thus we find that the Kamboja kings of Bengal were mostly Vedic Hindus, of course, with the exception of king Rajyapala. Mention is made of grants of lands and villages to the Purohits in the Burdwan district of east Bengal. According to Prof R. C. Majumdar: "More significant, however, is the inclusion of Purohits in the land grants of the Kamboja, Varman and Sena kings of Bengal. It indicates the great importance was attached to religious and social aspects of administration during rules of these dynasties which were all followers of orthodox Hinduism." Dr B. N. Sen says that the Buddhism which had followers in the early Pala and Candra rulers was probably on the decline in Bengal during the 10th century. On the other hand, the Vedic religion was on the rise. Since the Kamboja Pala kings of Bengal were mostly Vedic Hindus, hence they must have got full support from their subject which must have helped them raise a powerful empire in Bengal.

== Later Kamboja rulers in Bengal ==
There is a literary evidence which attests one Kamboja king known as Jagan Nath ruling in Bengal as late as the 16th century. King Jagan Nath is stated to have patronised a Brahmana scholar Sura Mishra who had composed Jagannathaprakasa, a Smriti Granth in honour of this Kamboja king:

Adesh.Kambojakula.vatansah Shri Jagana Natha iti parsidhah
Akaryad dharmanibandhmaytam dhradhipaiapayairkablai nreshe

This shows that the Kamboja rule in some parts of Bengal must have continued, as late as the 16th century.

== See also ==
- Gopala I
- Dharmapala of Bengal
- Middle Kingdoms of India

Timeline and cultural period	Indus plain (Punjab-Sapta Sindhu-Gujarat)	Gangetic Plain			Central India	Southern India
Timeline and cultural period	Indus plain (Punjab-Sapta Sindhu-Gujarat)	Upper Gangetic Plain (Ganga-Yamuna doab)	Middle Gangetic Plain	Lower Gangetic Plain	Central India	Southern India
IRON AGE
Culture	Late Vedic Period	Late Vedic Period; Painted Grey Ware culture	Late Vedic Period; Northern Black Polished Ware		Pre-history	
6th century BCE	Gandhara	Kuru-Panchala	Magadha		Adivasi (tribes)	Assaka
Culture	Persian-Greek influences	"Second Urbanisation"; Rise of Shramana movements Jainism - Buddhism - Ājīvika - Yoga			Pre-history	
5th century BCE	(Persian conquests)		Shaishunaga dynasty		Adivasi (tribes)	Assaka
4th century BCE	(Greek conquests)	Nanda empire				
HISTORICAL AGE
Culture	Spread of Buddhism				Pre-history	
3rd century BCE	Maurya Empire					Satavahana dynasty Sangam period (300 BCE – 200 CE); Early Cholas; Early Pandyan kingdom Cheras
Culture	Preclassical Hinduism (Note: Michaels (2004) p.39) - "Hindu Synthesis" (Note: Hiltebeitel (2002)) (ca. 200 BCE - 300 CE) (Note: Michaels (2004) p.39) (Note: Hiltebeitel (2002)); Epics - Puranas - Ramayana - Mahabharata - Bhagavad Gita - Brahma Sutras - Smarta Tradition; Mahayana Buddhism					
2nd century BCE	Indo-Greek Kingdom		Shunga Empire; Maha-Meghavahana Dynasty			Satavahana dynasty Sangam period (300 BCE – 200 CE); Early Cholas; Early Pandyan kingdom Cheras
1st century BCE	Indo-Greek Kingdom		Shunga Empire; Maha-Meghavahana Dynasty			Satavahana dynasty Sangam period (300 BCE – 200 CE); Early Cholas; Early Pandyan kingdom Cheras
1st century CE	Indo-Scythians; Indo-Parthians		Kuninda Kingdom			Satavahana dynasty Sangam period (300 BCE – 200 CE); Early Cholas; Early Pandyan kingdom Cheras
2nd century	Kushan Empire					Satavahana dynasty Sangam period (300 BCE – 200 CE); Early Cholas; Early Pandyan kingdom Cheras
3rd century	Kushano-Sasanian Kingdom; Western Satraps	Kushan Empire		Kamarupa kingdom	Adivasi (tribes)	Satavahana dynasty Sangam period (300 BCE – 200 CE); Early Cholas; Early Pandyan kingdom Cheras
Culture	"Golden Age of Hinduism"(ca. CE 320-650) (Note: Michaels (2004) p.40); Puranas - Kural; Co-existence of Hinduism and Buddhism					
4th century	Kidarites	Gupta Empire; Varman dynasty				Andhra Ikshvakus; Kalabhra dynasty Kadamba Dynasty; Western Ganga Dynasty
5th century	Hephthalite Empire	Alchon Huns				Vishnukundina; Kalabhra dynasty
6th century	Nezak Huns; Kabul Shahi; Maitraka				Adivasi (tribes)	Vishnukundina; Badami Chalukyas; Kalabhra dynasty
Culture	Late-Classical Hinduism (ca. CE 650-1100) (Note: Michaels (2004) p.41); Advaita Vedanta - Tantra; Decline of Buddhism in India					
7th century	Indo-Sassanids		Vakataka dynasty Empire of Harsha	Mlechchha dynasty	Adivasi (tribes)	Badami Chalukyas; Eastern Chalukyas; Pandyan kingdom (revival); Pallava
7th century	Karkota dynasty				Adivasi (tribes)	
8th century	Kabul Shahi	Pala Empire			Adivasi (tribes)	Eastern Chalukyas; Pandyan kingdom Kalachuri
9th century	Gurjara-Pratihara				Adivasi (tribes)	Rashtrakuta Empire; Eastern Chalukyas; Pandyan kingdom Medieval Cholas; Chera Perumals of Makkotai
10th century	Ghaznavids			Pala dynasty Kamboja-Pala dynasty	Adivasi (tribes)	Kalyani Chalukyas; Eastern Chalukyas; Medieval Cholas; Chera Perumals of Makkotai; Rashtrakuta
References and sources for table References Sources: Flood, Gavin D. (1996), An Introduction to Hinduism, Cambridge University Press; Hiltebeitel, Alf (2002), Hinduism. In: Joseph Kitagawa, "The Religious Traditions of Asia: Religion, History, and Culture", Routledge; Michaels, Axel (2004), Hinduism. Past and present, Princeton, New Jersey: Princeton University Press
