= Kalyanachandra =

- Reign: c. 975 – 1000
- Predecessor: Srichandra
- Successor: Ladahachandra
- Issue: Ladahachandra
- House: Chandra
- Dynasty: Chandra
- Father: Srichandra
- Religion: Buddhism

Kalyanachandra (reigned c. 975 – 1000) was the third ruler of the Chandra dynasty in eastern Bengal. His campaign against the Kamboja dynasty in Varendra allowed the resurgent Pala Emperor Mahipala I to reclaim much of North Bengal.

Preceded by Srichandra	Chandra King c. 975 – 1000 CE	Succeeded by Ladahachandra
