= Harikela =

Kingdom in ancient Bengal

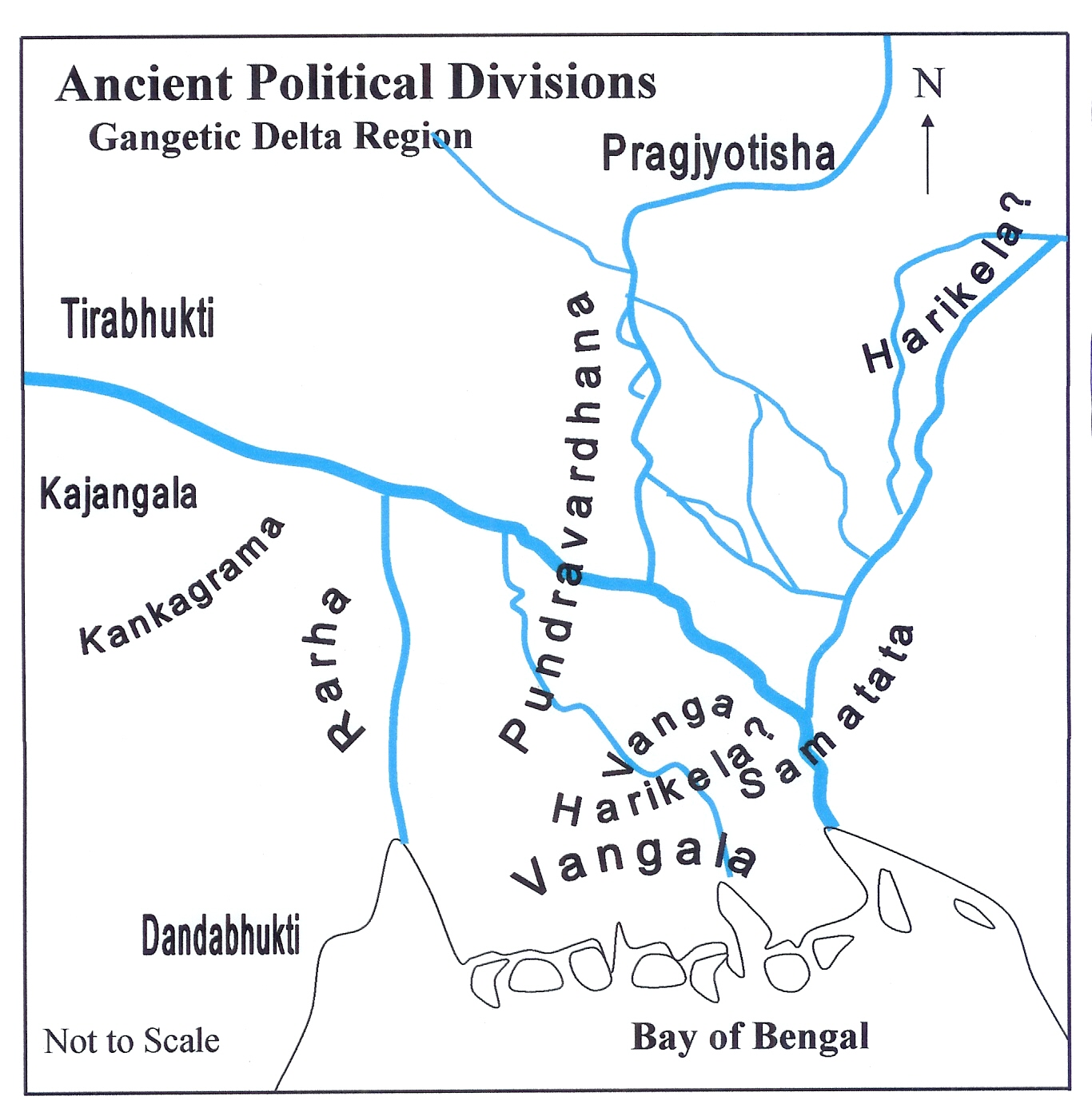
Ancient Political Divisions

Harikela or Harkal (Bengali: হরিকেল বা হরকল) was an ancient kingdom located in the Bengal region of the Indian subcontinent. Originally, it was an independent township of ancient eastern Bengal, which had a continuous existence of about 500 years. The state of Harikal consisted of present-day Sylhet and Chittagong divisions of Bangladesh, as well as parts of former kingdom of Cachar (South Assam) and the Tripura state of India.

== History ==
Two seventh century Chinese travellers mention a kingdom of Harikela. Hemachandra, an 11th-century lexicographer described it as a synonymous term of Vanga in his book Abhidhanachintamani. The ancient Indian philosopher and scholar Yadava Prakasa also mentioned Harikela belongs to the territory of Vanga. The kingdom was ruled by the Chandra dynasty during the 10th century CE. They were overthrown by the Varman Dynasty of Southeast Bengal, who were in turn overthrown by the Deva dynasty. The region is considered as a part of Vangala region of ancient Bengal and Chittagong was the capital of King Gopichandra.

== Geography ==
For a time its capital was near Chittagong before being moved to Munshiganj by the Candras. Arab traders recognised Harikela (known as Harkand in Arabic) as the coastal regions of Bengal (near Chittagong) in the early period and included Sylhet in the later period reaching as far as the ancient Sundarbans.
