= Barlekha Upazila =

Barlekha বড়লেখা
- Upazila
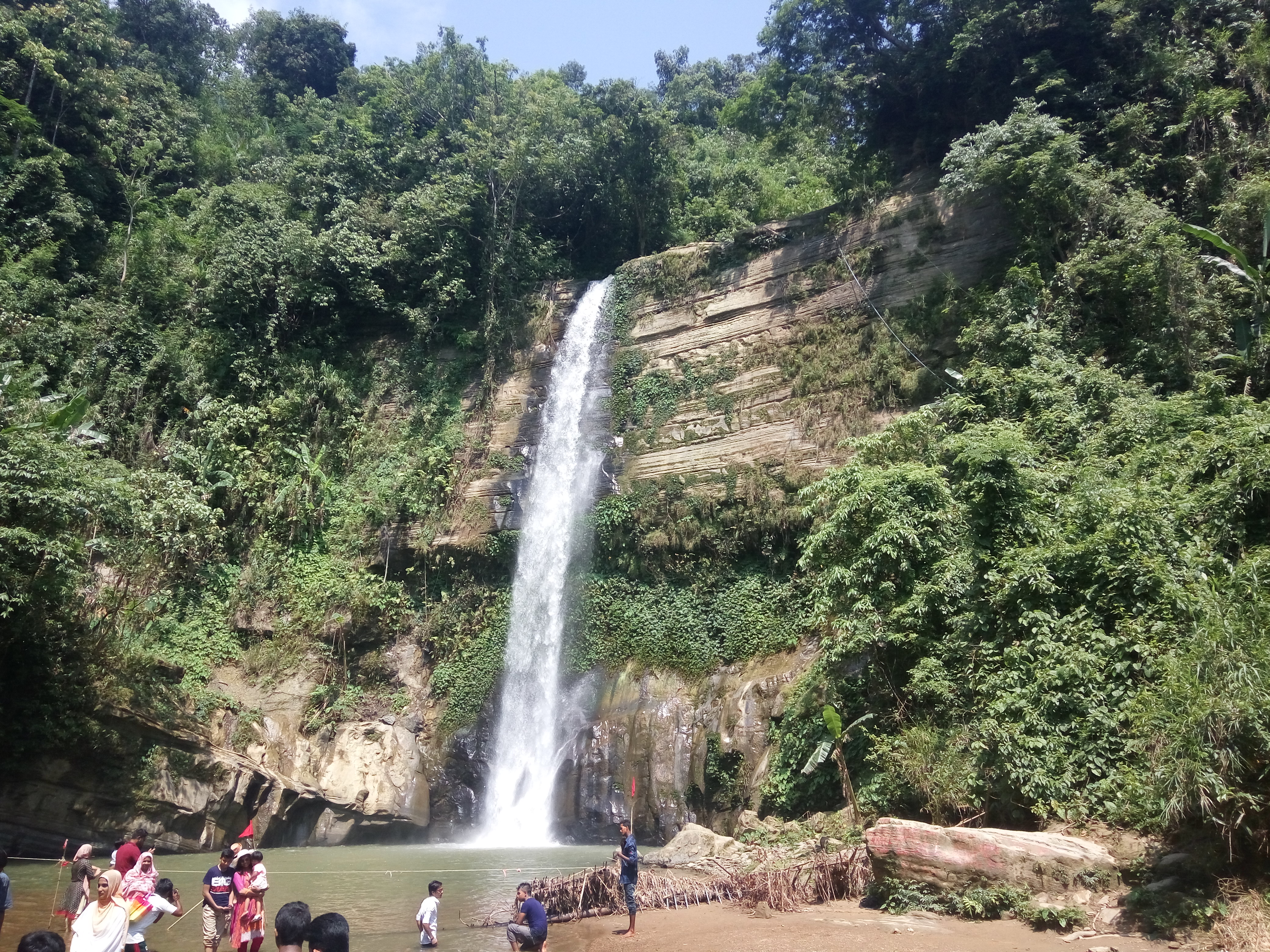
- Madhabkunda waterfall

- Coordinates: 24°42.5′N 92°12′E
- Country: Bangladesh
- Division: Sylhet
- District: Moulvibazar

Government
  - MP (Moulvibazar-1): Nasir Uddin Ahmed Mithu
  - Upazila Nirbahi Officer: Mahbub Alam Mahbub
  - Upazila Chairman: Vacant
  - Municipality Mayor: Vacant

Area
  - Total: 448.86 km^{2} (173.31 sq mi)

Population (2022)
  - Total: 282,452
  - Density: 629.27/km^{2} (1,629.8/sq mi)
- Demonym(s): Sylheti, Barlekhi, Borlekhi
- Time zone: UTC+6 (BST)
- Postal code: 3250
- Area code: 08622
- Website: barlekha.moulvibazar.gov.bd

Barlekha Upazila mauza geocode map

Barlekha (Bengali: বড়লেখা, romanized: Bôrlekha) is an upazila of Moulvibazar District, located in Sylhet Division, Bangladesh.

== Etymology ==
Barlekha Upazila is named after Barlekha (formerly 'Barlikha') which means Great Likha. Likha was an area historically under the Panchakhanda pargana, and an ancient shloka by Mukundaram Siddhanta refers to the area by this name. Likha was later divided into Barlikha (Great Likha) and Chhotalikha (Little Likha); the latter of which still exists as a village within the upazila.

== History ==
The Malegarh hillock at Lathu (came to be known later as Shahbajpur), the northern tip of Barlekha Upazila, was shaken up in November 1857 after Indian rebels revolted in Meerut. The soldiers of 34 Native Infantry in Chittagong revolted, looted the armoury and treasury and set army barracks on fire. These rebel soldiers, on their way to reach Manipur, pitched their tents at Malegarh. A force of 160 company soldiers under Major Byng, initially reached Protaphgarh (now in India) and then Malegarh on December 19, 1857. In that battle, Major Byng and four other company soldiers lost their lives. The mutineers retreated leaving behind twenty-six rebels including Major Sher Khan and Captain Shamsher Khan. For those who lived long enough to make it to Manipur, they were attacked not only by the company soldiers but also Kuki scouts. Ali Bakhsh of Chittagong, one of the rebels, was caught and charged of desertion, robbery and revolt. Gonjer Ali of Pratapgarh and Zamindar Gaus Ali Khan of nearby Prithimpasha were accused of helping the rebels.

At the Delhi Durbar on 12 December 1911, King George V announced the reunification of a Bengal Province and the creation of an Assam Province. During this time, the Sylhet region was split into four mahakumas (or subdivisions); Sylhet (including Moulvibazar), Habiganj, Sunamganj and Karimganj. In 1882, the Sylhet Mahakuma was split into two; Sylhet and South Sylhet. On 18 May 1940, one of the five thanas of the Karimganj Mahakuma, Jolodhup, was planned to also be split into two - Beanibazar and Barlekha. Beanibazar went to Sylhet Mahakuma while Barlekha went to South Sylhet (Moulvibazar) Mahakuma.

On 1 July 1983, Barlekha Thana was upgraded into an upazila.

== Geography ==
Barlekha is located at 24.7083°N 92.2000°E. The area of the upazila is 448.86 km^{2}.

== Demography ==
Religions in Barlekha Upazila (2022)
Religion	Percent
Islam	83.69%
Hinduism	15.35%
Christianity	0.91%
Other or not stated	0.05%

According to the 2022 Bangladeshi census, Baralekha Upazila had 55,252 households and a population of 282,452. 10.30% of the population were under 5 years of age. Baralekha had a literacy rate (age 7 and over) of 78.87%: 80.26% for males and 77.68% for females, and a sex ratio of 88.46 males for every 100 females. 46,145 (16.34%) lived in urban areas. Ethnic population is 6228 (2.20%) of which Khasi are 2382.

According to the 2011 Census of Bangladesh, Barlekha Upazila had 44,192 households and a population of 257,620. 69,612 (27.02%) were under 10 years of age. Barlekha had a literacy rate (age 7 and over) of 52.42%, compared to the national average of 51.8%, and a sex ratio of 1071 females per 1000 males. 26,672 (10.35%) lived in urban areas. Ethnic population was 6,370 (2.47%), of which Khasi were 1,813 and Santal 867.

At the 1991 Bangladesh census, Barlekha had a population of 200,674, of whom 50.09% were aged 18 or older (against the national average of 48.52%). Of the population, 49.86% were male (national average of 51.48%) and 50.14% female (national average of 48.52%). The average literacy rate (measured as having 7+ years of education) was 34.6%, against the national average of 32.4%. 70.59% of the population were Muslim, 28.31% Hindu, 0.92% Christian, 0.04% Buddhist, and 0.14% other beliefs. Ethnic nationals include Khasi and Santal, who have their own languages.

== Manufacturing and minerals ==
There are 18 tea gardens in Barlekha spread over an area of 64.39 km^{2}, most of which were established by the English tea planters during the time of British Raj. Each garden has its own tea-processing factory. Tea laborers who work in the gardens were brought in the 1800s from outside of Bengal under rather questionable working conditions. Sujanagar of this upazila is known for producing incense and attar (essence of flowers and Agar tree). For over a century, these have found markets in Middle Eastern and Far Eastern countries. There are about 350-400 agar attar factories in Barlekha. Agar attar is considered as liquid gold of Bangladesh. About 2000 litres of agar attar is produced in Barlekha every year. Cottage industries include weaving, sheetalpati, bamboo and cane work, iron work, and potteries are other works of Barlekha.

At Kesrigul, there is an abandoned oil field of Burma Eastern Oil Company. It was a fully functional oil field but had to be sealed off in 1951 following a disastrous oil flood when crude oil burst out of the well and flooded the surrounding area.

Deposit of radioactive uranium has been discovered in Haragachha Hill at Juri, and an expert team has authenticated its reserve.

== Economy and tourism ==
Barlekha is home to many points of interest. Madhabkunda waterfall is one of the most well-known tourist attractions in the country. It is Bangladesh's largest waterfall boasting a height of 200 ft (61m) and is set in a green Eco-park setting. Madhabkunda is surrounded by the hills full of tea plants. Every year thousands of tourists are drawn to Madhabkunda because of its natural environment, especially in winter. It is about 15 km from Barlekha railway station, and 350 km from the city of Dhaka. Geologically, this waterfall is in the Patharia Structure and is composed of the rocks of the Bhuban Formation. Local Hindus believe the circular pool where the water falls is a magical place, and many worshippers go there every year. Although the water in the pool is not very deep, several tourists have lost their lives in Madhabkunda by the force of the water.

Other sites include the mausoleums of Shah Dariya Pir in Chandpur, Syed Yaqub in Horipur and Syed Abu Bakr in Chotolekha. A 16th century mosque located in Loghati, Dasher Bazar is an archaeological heritage site that continues to attract visitors.

Hakaluki Haor represents a complex wetland system with more than 80 interconnecting beels in a shallow basin formed between the Patharia and Madhab Hills to the east and the Bhatera Hills to the west. The major sources of water are the Juri, Sonai Bardhal and Kushiyara rivers, which traverse the wetland and drain through a single outlet, the Kushiyara River. While the haor itself is a seasonal water body formed during the monsoon, the beels are low-lying depressions of the haor system retaining water even during the dry months of the season. Thus, the haor system is a complex of both lacustrine wetlands (with open water) and palustrine wetlands (marshy – with vegetation), depending on the hydraulic behaviour in different seasons. In rainy season it takes the shape of a sea. Hakaluki Haor has a wide variety of waterfowl as well as wintering migratory birds. Every winter, tens of thousands of guest birds of about 150 species from Siberia and other cold regions flock to the haors. They include Bright and Rose King-duck, Pati-duck, Bali Hash, Lenja, Chity, Sorali, Boikal, Nilshir Piyan, Pantamukhi, Pankouri, Buti-duck, China, Rangamuri, Black-duck, Peributhi, Chokachoki, Giria, Khonjona, Patari, Dolpipi, Water-hen, North-Giria, Dahuk, Patibatan, Common-chill, Cotton-Chill, Gergini, Cottontail, Pintail, Toughed Duck.

Hakaluki Haor presents a unique type of ecosystem as well as a new set of management issues. Most of the local inhabitants are in some way dependent on the wetland for their livelihood. Hakaluki Haor supports one of the largest inland fisheries in Bangladesh. It is one of the so-called 'mother fishery areas', i.e. areas where brood, young and juvenile fish aggregate and take refuge during the dry season when the rest of the haor area becomes dry. While the area was once known as a "fishmine", its fish stocks are now increasingly threatened. Hakaluki Haor is on a global level a very important wetland for a wide variety of waterfowl, particularly Anatidae ducks. In the 1960s, the wintering population of ducks was estimated at between 40,000 and 60,000.Every year a lot of birds making their nest in the house of Late Haji Monuhor Ali Master's house. This house became very well known as Masterer Pakir Bari which is a popular tourist attraction to the naturalist. Everyday a lot of local and international tourists visit Masterer Pakir Bari. In Hakaluki Haor threatened species such as Pallas' Fish Eagle also occurs at the wetland, which is furthermore an important area for reptiles such as freshwater turtles, and for amphibians.

== Administration ==
Barlekha Upazila is divided into Barlekha Municipality and ten union parishads: Baralekha, Borni, Dakshin Dakshinbhag, Dakshin Shahbazpur, Dasherbazar, Nizbahadurpur, Sujanagar, Talimpur, Uttar Dakshinbhag, and Uttar Shahbazpur. The union parishads are subdivided into 139 mauzas and 269 villages.

Barlekha Municipality is subdivided into 9 wards and 27 mahallas.

== Education ==
- Jamia Islamia Darul Ulum Azimganj
- Barlekha City School
- Shatma Adarsho Govt Primary School
- Siddique Ali High School was established at 1927
- Patharia Chotolekha (P. C.) Govt High School
- Barlekha Girls' High School was established in the 1960s
- Barlekha Govt College
- Nari Shiksha Academy degree College
- M.M Ali College (Borni)
- Narishiksha Academy Secondary School
- Muraul high school was established in 1983
- Dasher Bazar High School
- Dasher Bazar Adarsho College
- Eidgah Bazar Girls High School
- Talimpur Baharpur High School
- Fokhiro Bazar High School
- Chandrogram High School
- Sujanagar Ideal Alim Madrasah
- Pakshail Adarsho High School
- Itauri Hazi Younus Miah Memorial High School
- Hakaluki high school
- Kansai hakaluki girls high school
- sultan Mahmud islami Academy
- Sujaul Senior Fazil Madrasha

== Notable residents ==
- Ebadur Rahman Chowdhury, politician and Ex Minister
- Ebadot Hossain Chowdhury, bowler for the Bangladesh national cricket team
- Hasibul Hossain, cricketer
- Muhammad Sirajul Islam, politician
- Mohammad Ataul Karim, provost and executive vice chancellor at University of Massachusetts Dartmouth, Scientist.
- Dwijen Sharma, botanist and environmentalist
- Md. Shahab Uddin, politicians

== See also ==
- Upazilas of Bangladesh
- Districts of Bangladesh
- Divisions of Bangladesh
- Madhabkunda waterfall
