= Sagornal Union =

Coordinates: 24.467°N 92.133°E

Sagornal Union সাগরনাল ইউনিয়ন Shagornal, Sagarnal
- Union Council
- No. 6 Sagornal Union Council
- Location in Bangladesh
- Country: Bangladesh
- Division: Sylhet Division
- District: Moulvibazar District
- Upazila: Juri Upazila

Population
  - Total: 34,492
- Demonym(s): Sagarnali, Shagornali, Sagornali,Juribashi, Moulvibazari, Sylheti
- Time zone: UTC+6 (BST)
- Website: sagornalup.moulvibazar.gov.bd

Sagarnal Union Council (Bengali: সাগরনাল, romanized: Shagornal) is a Union Parishad of Bangladesh, located in Juri Upazila, Moulvibazar District, Sylhet Division. It has an area of 29 square kilometres and a population of 34,492.

== Demography ==
Sagarnal has a population of 34,492.

== Administration ==
Sagarnal constitutes the no. 6 union council of Juri Upazila. It contains 16 villages and 14 mouzas.

The villages are as follows: Sagornal (North, South and Tea Garden), Kapna Mountain Tea Garden, Bathnighat, Baradahar (North, South, East and West), Jalalpur, Hosnabad, Birgugali, Patilashangon, Jangaliya and Kharkuna.

== Economy and tourism ==
Sagornal has four Haat bazaars.

== Education ==
The Union has a literacy rate of 70%. It has 8 government primary schools, 7 private primary schools. Sagornal High School is one of two high schools. It also has 4 junior schools. There is one madrasa which is Sagornal Senior Alim Madrasha.

== Language and culture ==
The native population converse in their native Sylheti dialect but can also converse in Standard Bengali. Languages such as Arabic and English are also taught in schools. The Union contains 30 mosques. They are as follows:

1. Kashinagar Jame Masjid
2. Batnighat Jame Masjid
3. Birgugali Jame Masjid
4. South Patila Shangon Jame Masjid, Patila Shongon Baytul Jannat Dorer Par Jame Masjid, Patila Shangon Chutiyabari Jame Masjid
5. West Patila Shangon Jame Masjid, Patila Shangon Hatiwali Jame Masjid, Patila Shangon Jame Masjid, Patila Shangon Baytul Aman Jame Masjid
6. Jangaliya Jame Masjid
7. Hosnabad Jame Masjid Babusingh Gaon
8. Boroitola Jame Masjid Boroituli, Boroituli Panjegana Jame Masjid
9. East Baradahar Jame Masjid, South Baradahar Jame Masjid, North Baradahar Jame Masjid
10. North Sagornal Tilagaon Baytus Salam Jame Masjid, North Central Sagornal Jame Masjid, North Sagornal Nalarpar Jame Masjid, North Sagornal Jurirpar Jame Masjid
11. Northeast Sagornal Jame Masjid, North Sagornal Timukhi Jame Masjid, South Sagornal Jame Masjid, Southeast Sagornal Jame Masjid,
12. South Sagornal Rahmaniya Jame Masjid Kathatila, Southwest Sagornal Jame Masjid and Mazar
13. Sagornal Tea Garden Jame Masjid
14. Kapna Pahar Jame Masjid

It also has 5 eidgahs and they are: Sagornal Shahi Eidgah, South Sagornal Shahi Eidgah, Maqam Bari Eidgah, Batnighat Shahi Eidgah and Patilashangon Shahi Eidgah.

== List of chairmen ==
List of chairmen
Number	Name	Term
01	Haji Ghiyathuddin Chowdhury	1960 - 1972
02	Alhaj Mahmud Ali	1974 - 1984
03	Abdul Hannan Chowdhury	1984 - 1988
04	Abdun Nur	1988 - 1992
05	Abdul Hannan Chowdhury	1992 - 1998
06	Abdun Nur	4/2/1998 - 3/3/2003
07	Abdul Hannan Chowdhury	2003-2011
08	Imdadul Islam Chowdhury Liyaqat	2011–present
