= Govindachandra (Chandra dynasty) =

- Reign: c. 1020 – c. 1045
- Predecessor: Ladahachandra
- House: Chandra
- Dynasty: Chandra
- Father: Ladahachandra
- Mother: Mainamati (Saubhagyadevi)
- Religion: Buddhism

Govindachandra (reigned c. 1020 – c. 1045) was the last known ruler of the Chandra dynasty in eastern Bengal.

== History ==
According to the Tirumalai inscription, during his reign, the kingdom faced a massive invasion by the Chola king, Rajendra Chola I between 1021–1024 CE. In the inscription he was identified as Govindachandra of Vangaladesa.

In early 1049 CE, the Kalachuri king, Karnadeva (reigned 1042–1072) also launched an attack on Govindachandra (which may have been the downfall of the Chandra dynasty) & placed his son-in-law Jatavarmana as the new king of Vikramapura. According to local folk ballads, Govindachandra gave up his crown to live the rest of his life as a Nathapanthi ascetic. In this ballads, his mother Mainamati is described to be a disciple of Gorakhnath & him becoming a disciple of Jalandharinath.

== Relation with Savar kingdom ==
King Govindachandra was also known as 'Raja Gopichandra'. He married the two daughters of Harishchandra Pala, the Mahishya Raja of Sarveshwar which was mentioned in local folk song named 'Mainamatir Gan'.

Preceded by Ladahachandra	Chandra King; 1020 – 1045 CE	Succeeded by unknown
