= Nasir Uddin Ahmed Mithu =

Bangladeshi politician

Member of Parliament

Member of Parliament for Moulvibazar-1
- Incumbent
- Assumed office 17 February 2026
- Preceded by: Shahab Uddin

Personal details
- Party: Bangladesh Nationalist Party
- Occupation: Businessman, industrialist and politician

Nasir Uddin Ahmed Mithu is a Bangladeshi businessman, industrialist and politician. He is a Member of Parliament from the Moulvibazar-1 constituency.

== Political career ==
Nasir Uddin Ahmed Mithu is a former vice president of Moulvibazar District unit of the Bangladesh Nationalist Party. He is also a member of the convening committee of Moulvibazar District BNP.

In the 13th Jatiya Sangsad election, 2026, he was elected for the first time as a Member of Parliament from the Moulvibazar-1 constituency as a candidate of the Bangladesh Nationalist Party.
