= Juri Upazila =

Juri জুড়ী
- Upazila
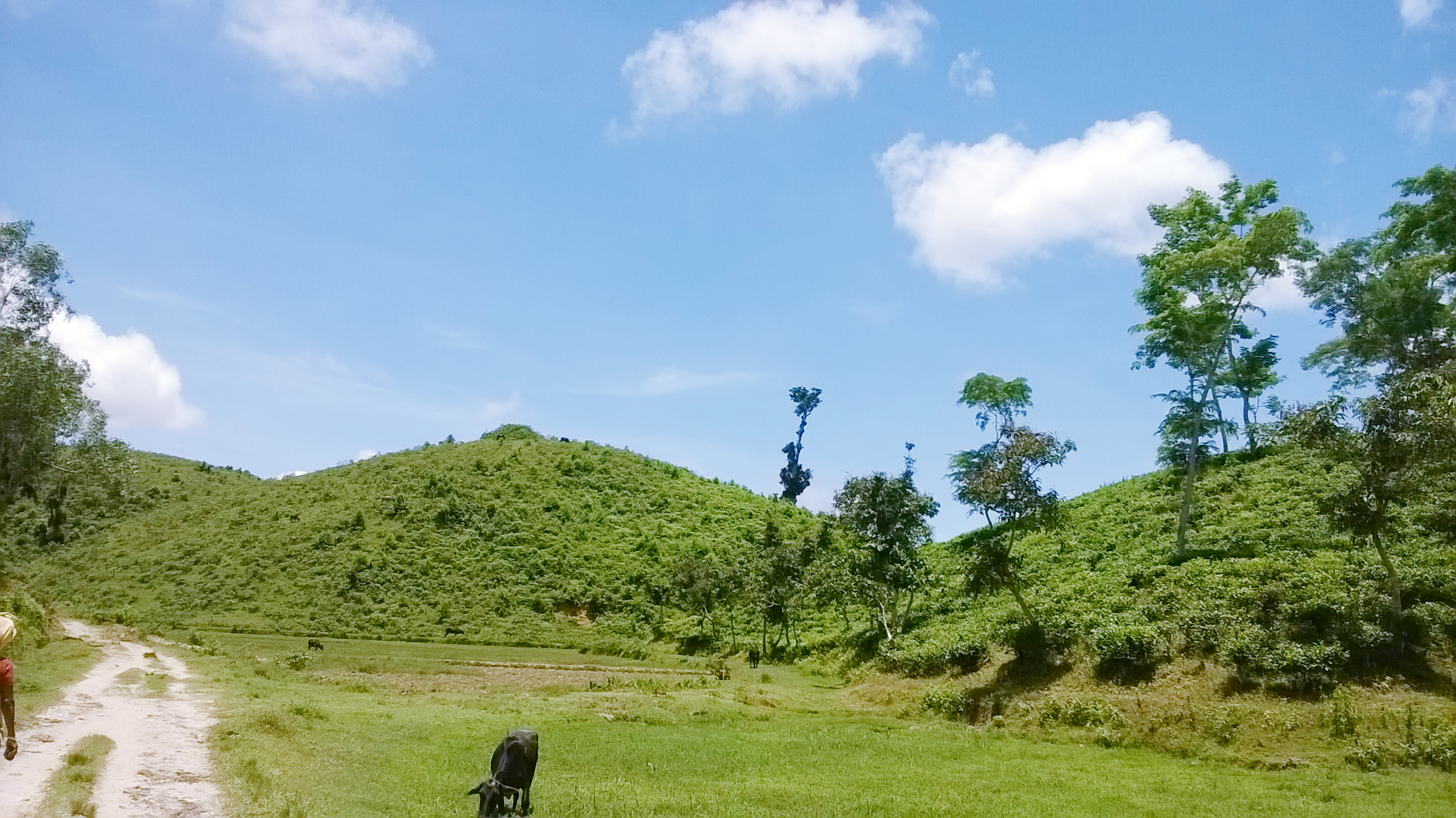
- Tea garden in Juri Upazila

- Coordinates: 24°35′50″N 92°06′50″E
- Country: Bangladesh
- Division: Sylhet
- District: Moulvibazar

Government
  - MP (Moulvibazar-1): Nasir Uddin Ahmed Mithu
  - Upazila Chairman: Vacant

Area
  - Total: 186.30 km^{2} (71.93 sq mi)

Population (2022)
  - Total: 162,572
  - Density: 872.64/km^{2} (2,260.1/sq mi)
- Time zone: UTC+6 (BST)
- Postal code: 3251
- Website: juri.moulvibazar.gov.bd

Juri (Bengali: জুড়ী) is an upazila of Moulvibazar District. It is located 48 km away from District headquarters.

Juri Upazila mauza geocode map

== History ==
After the Conquest of Sylhet in 1303, many disciples of Shah Jalal migrated to Juri where they preached the religion of Islam to the local people. Shah Gharib Khaki settled in Bhogtera, Jayfarnagar where his mazar remains and likewise for Shah Abdul-Aliyy Nimatra in Fultola Bazaar, Hazrat Irani in Dakshinbhag and Shah Qasimuddin Jibon Jyoti.

During the Bangladesh Liberation War of 1971, freedom fighters conducted operations in various tea gardens across modern-day Juri. The Pakistani army reached Juri on 2 December and many culverts and bridges were destroyed whilst fighting them. Battles were fought in the areas of Fultola, Sagornal and Kapnapahar. Jagadhari pond (behind Juri High School) is noted as a mass killing site. Juri was liberated on 4 December.

On 26 August 1984, Juri was founded as thana. It became an upazila on 8 January 2005 with eight unions of Kulaura Upazila and Barlekha Upazila, four unions from each of these two Upazilas. The inclusion of two unions, Dakshinvag and Sunagar, was disputed and was stayed by order of court.

On 12 March 2013, miscreants set fire around Radha Govinda temple in Amtail, Juri. However, the people living around the temple quickly took the fire under control.

== Demographics ==
According to the 2022 Bangladeshi census, Juri Upazila had 33,104 households and a population of 162,572. 10.37% of the population were under 5 years of age. Juri had a literacy rate (age 7 and over) of 75.56%: 77.93% for males and 73.43% for females, and a sex ratio of 91.67 males for every 100 females. 23,605 (14.52%) lived in urban areas.

According to the 2011 Census of Bangladesh, Juri Upazila had 27,509 households and a population of 148,958. 39,699 (26.65%) were under 10 years of age. In 2001, its population was 122,853. Juri had a literacy rate (age 7 and over) of 52.33%, compared to the national average of 51.8%, and a sex ratio of 1034 females per 1000 males. 13,291 (8.92%) lived in urban areas. Ethnic population was 5,297 (3.56%), of which Manipuri were 1,108 and Santal 1,095.

=== Ethnicity and religion ===
Religions in Juri Upazila (2022)
Religion	Percent
Islam	66.11%
Hinduism	33.40%
Other or not stated	0.49%

Population by religion in Union
Union	Muslim	Hindu	Others
Fultala Union	9,935	10,577	340
Gowalbari Union	15,629	9,103	123
Jayfarnagar Union	40,221	3,560	6
Pashchim Juri Union	12,155	13,162	6
Purba Juri Union	9,343	9,364	340
Sagarnal Union	20,176	10,921	7

🟩 Muslim majority 🟧 Hindu majority

Population of upazila by ethnicity (2022)
1. Bengali (94.7%)
2. Munda (1.59%)
3. Santal (1.04%)
4. Others (2.69%)

Ethnic population is 8652 (5.32%) of which Munda are 2586 and Santal is 1689.

== Administration ==
Juri Upazila is divided into six union parishads: Fultola, Gowalbari, Jayfarnagar, Paschim Juri, Purbo Juri, and Sagornal. The union parishads are subdivided into 69 mauzas and 142 villages.

== Education ==
There are three colleges in the upazila. They include Tayebunnesa Khanam Academy Degree College, founded in 1994, and Shah Nimatra Sagornal Fultola College. The former is the only honors level one.

Juri Model Government High School is the only public secondary school in the upazila.

The madrasa education system includes one fazil madrasa.
