= Jagaddala Mahavihara =

Archeological site of Bangladesh

- জগদ্দল মহাবিহার (Bengali)
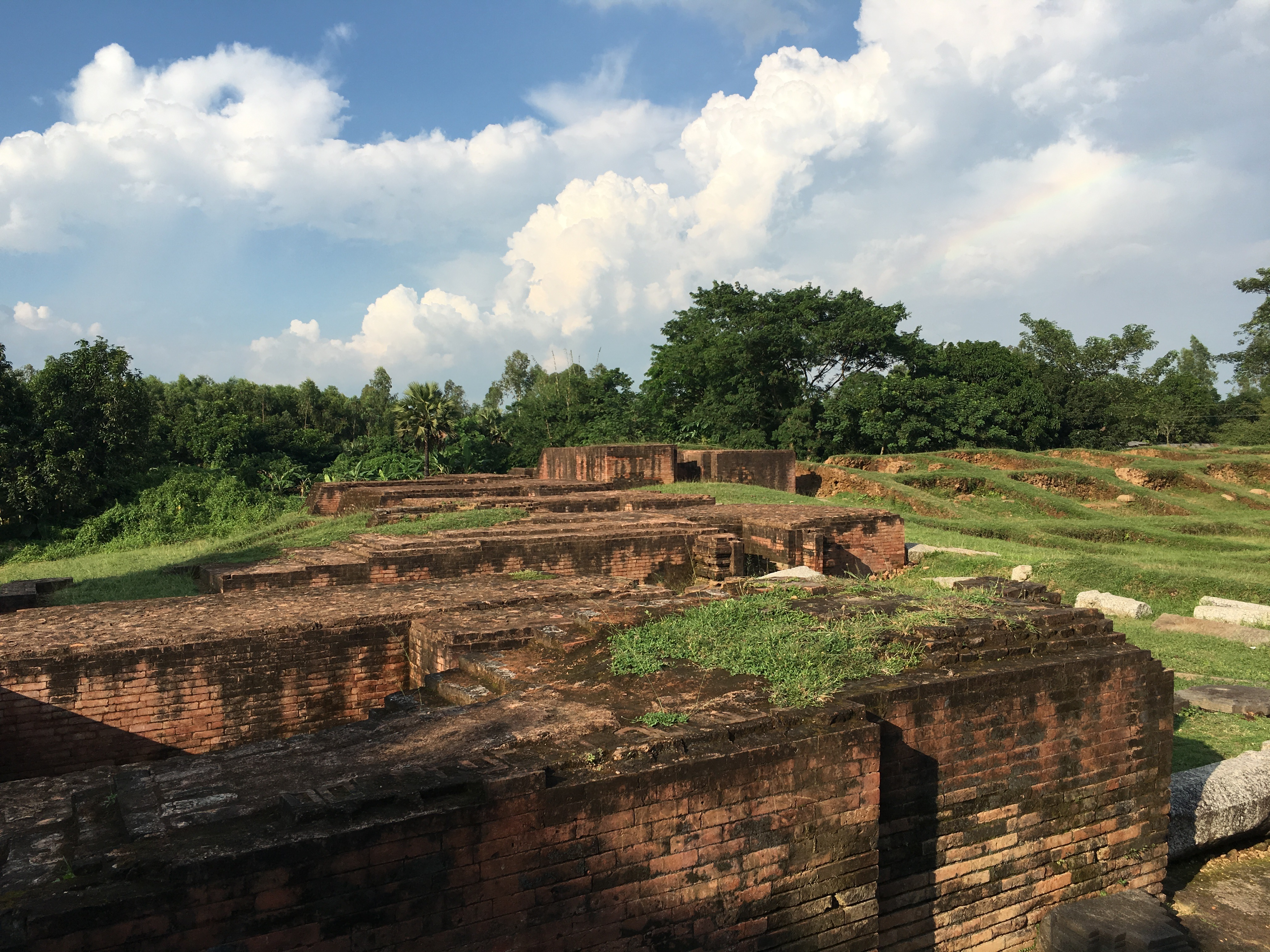
- Ruins of Jagaddala Mahavihara

- Location within Bangladesh Location within South Asia
- 25°9′32″N 88°53′15″E
- Type: Vihāra, ancient university
- Cultures: Buddhism
- Location: Naogaon, Rajshahi, Bangladesh

History
- Built: Late 11th century
- Abandoned: 1207

Jagaddala Mahavihara (fl. late 11th century - mid-12th century) was a Buddhist monastery and seat of learning in Varendra, a geographical unit in present north Bengal in Bangladesh. It was founded by the later kings of the Pāla dynasty, probably Ramapala (c. 1077-1120), most likely at a site near the present village of Jagdal in Dhamoirhat Upazila in the north-west Bangladesh on the border with India, near Paharapur. Some texts also spell the name Jaggadala.

== Location ==
Little is known about Jagaddala compared with the other mahaviharas of the era. For many years, its site was could not be ascertained. A.K.M. Zakaria inspected five likely locations, all called Jagdal or Jagadal, in the Rajshahi-Malda region: in Panchagarh; in Haripur Upazila of Thakurgaon; in Bochaganj Upazila in Dinajpur; in Dhamoirhat Upazila of Naogaon; Bamangola block of Malda, India. Of these, significant ancient ruins were present only near the Jagdal in Naogaon district. Excavations under the aegis of Unesco over the past decade have established the site as a Buddhist monastery.

== History ==
=== Founding ===
A large number of monasteries or viharas were established in ancient Bengal and Magadha during the four centuries of Pala rule in Northeast India (756-1174 AD). Dharmapala (781-821) is said to have founded 50 viharas himself, including Vikramashila, the premier university of the era. Jaggadala was founded toward the end of the Pāla dynasty, most likely by Rāmapāla (c. 1077-1120). According to Tibetan sources, five great Mahaviharas stood out: Vikramashila; Nalanda, past its prime but still illustrious; Somapura; Odantapurā; and Jagaddala. The five monasteries formed a network; "all of them were under state supervision" and their existed "a system of co-ordination among them ... it seems from the evidence that the different seats of Buddhist learning that functioned in eastern India under the Pāla were regarded together as forming a network, an interlinked group of institutions," and it was common for great scholars to move easily from position to position among them.

Jagaddala specialized in Vajrayana Buddhism. A large number of texts that would later appear in the Kangyur and Tengyur were known to have been composed or copied at Jagaddala. It is likely that the earliest dated anthology of Sanskrit verse, the Subhāṣitaratnakoṣa, was compiled by Vidyākara at Jaggadala toward the end of the 11th century or the beginning of the 12th.

=== Abandonment ===
Śākyaśribhadra, a Kashmiri scholar who was an abbot of Nalanda Mahavihara and instrumental in transmitting Buddhism to Tibet, is said to have fled to Tibet in 1204 from Jagaddala when Muslim incursions seemed imminent. Historian Sukumar Dutt tentatively placed the final destruction of Jagaddala to 1207; in any case it seems to have been the last mahavihara to be overrun.

== Excavation and UNESCO status ==
In 1999 Jagaddala was submitted as a tentative site for inclusion on the list of UNESCO World Heritage sites. UNESCO reports that excavations have revealed "an extensive mound, 105 metres long by 85 metres, which represents the archaeological remains of a Buddhist monastery . . . finds have included terracotta plaques, ornamental bricks, nails, a gold ingot and three stone images of deities.

== Photo gallery ==
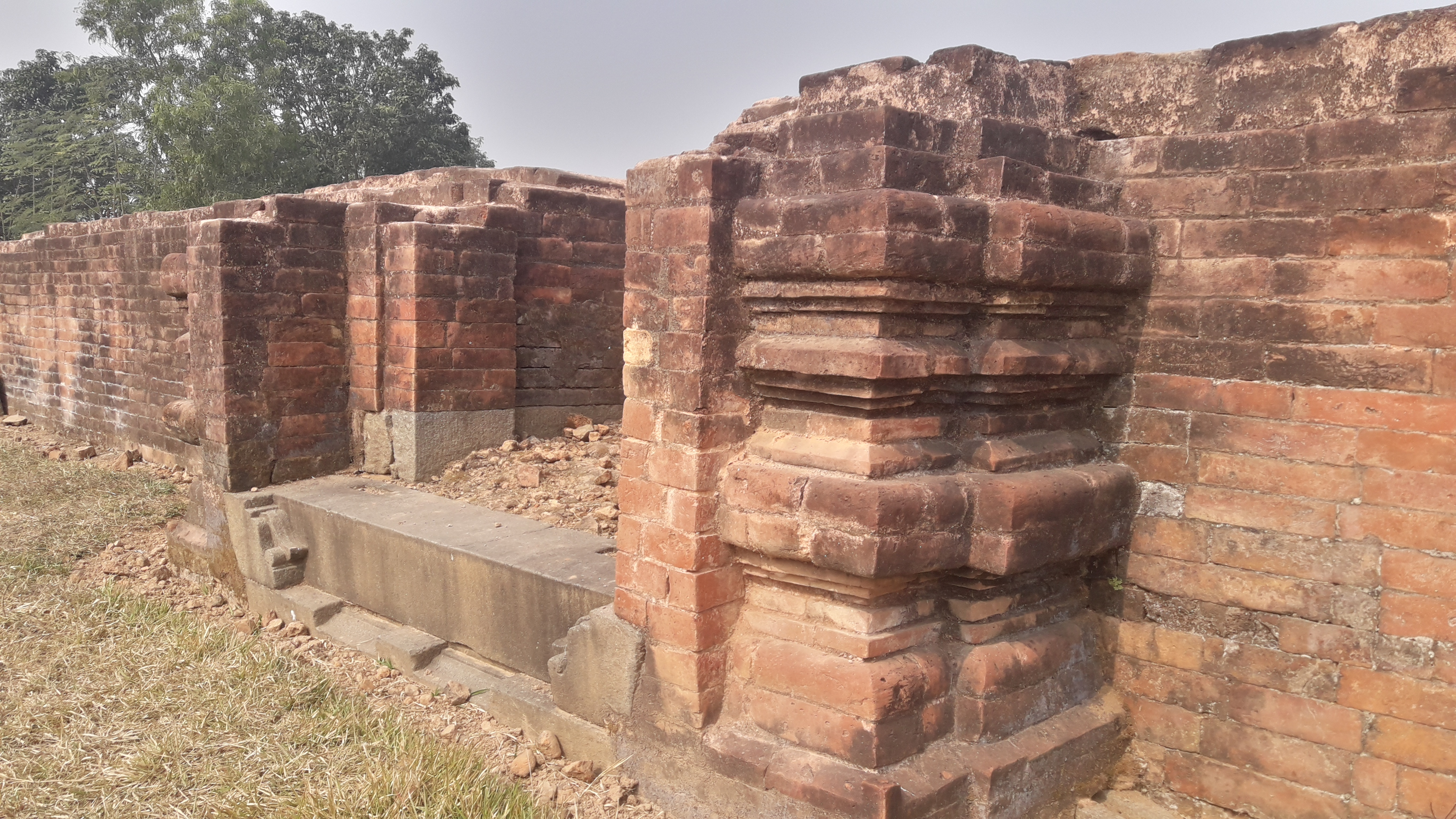
Ruins of Jagaddala Mahavihara

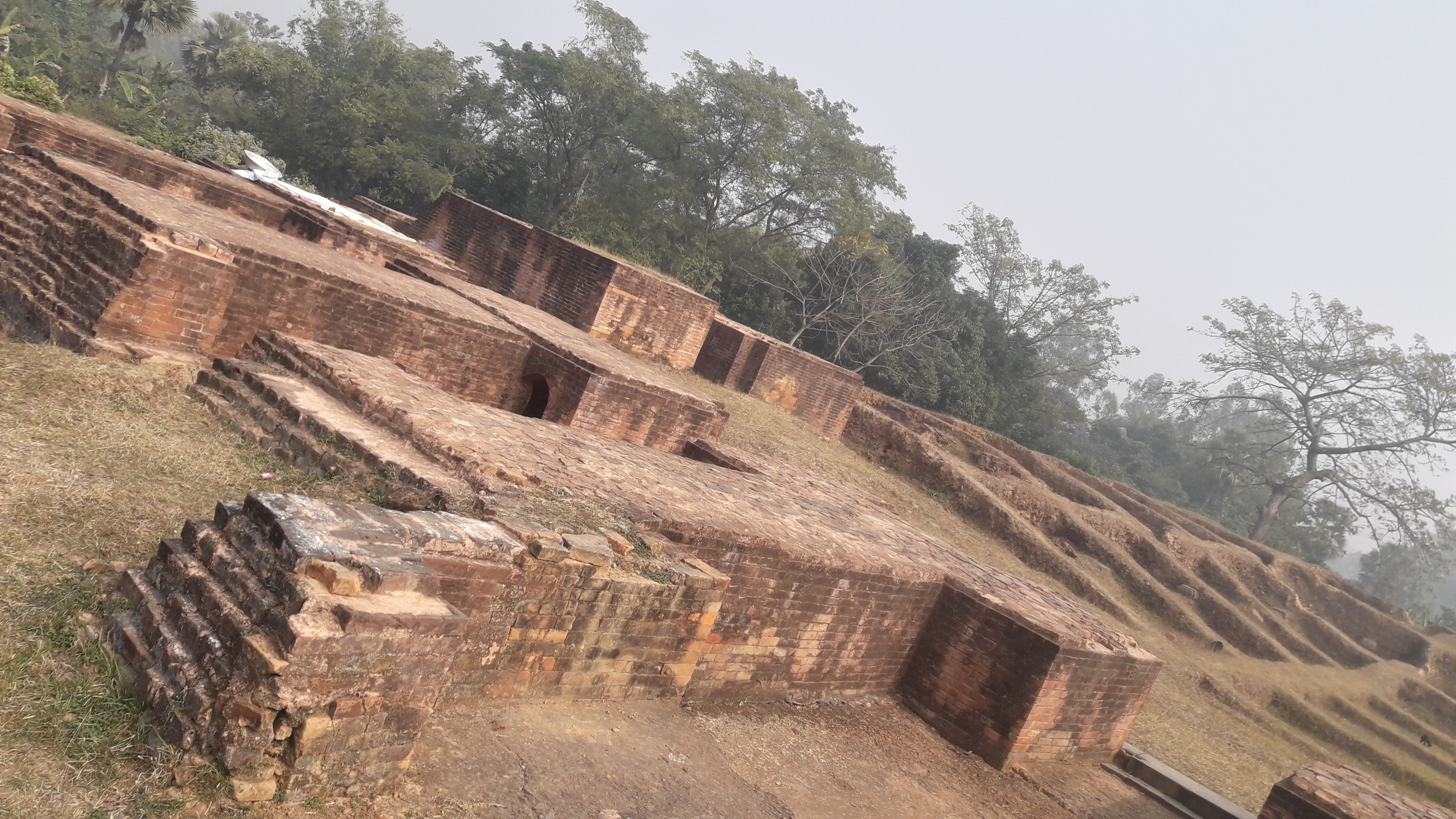
Jagaddala Mahavihara is the only Buddhist vihara identified & excavated in Bangladesh which has a rooftop of around 60 cm thickness.

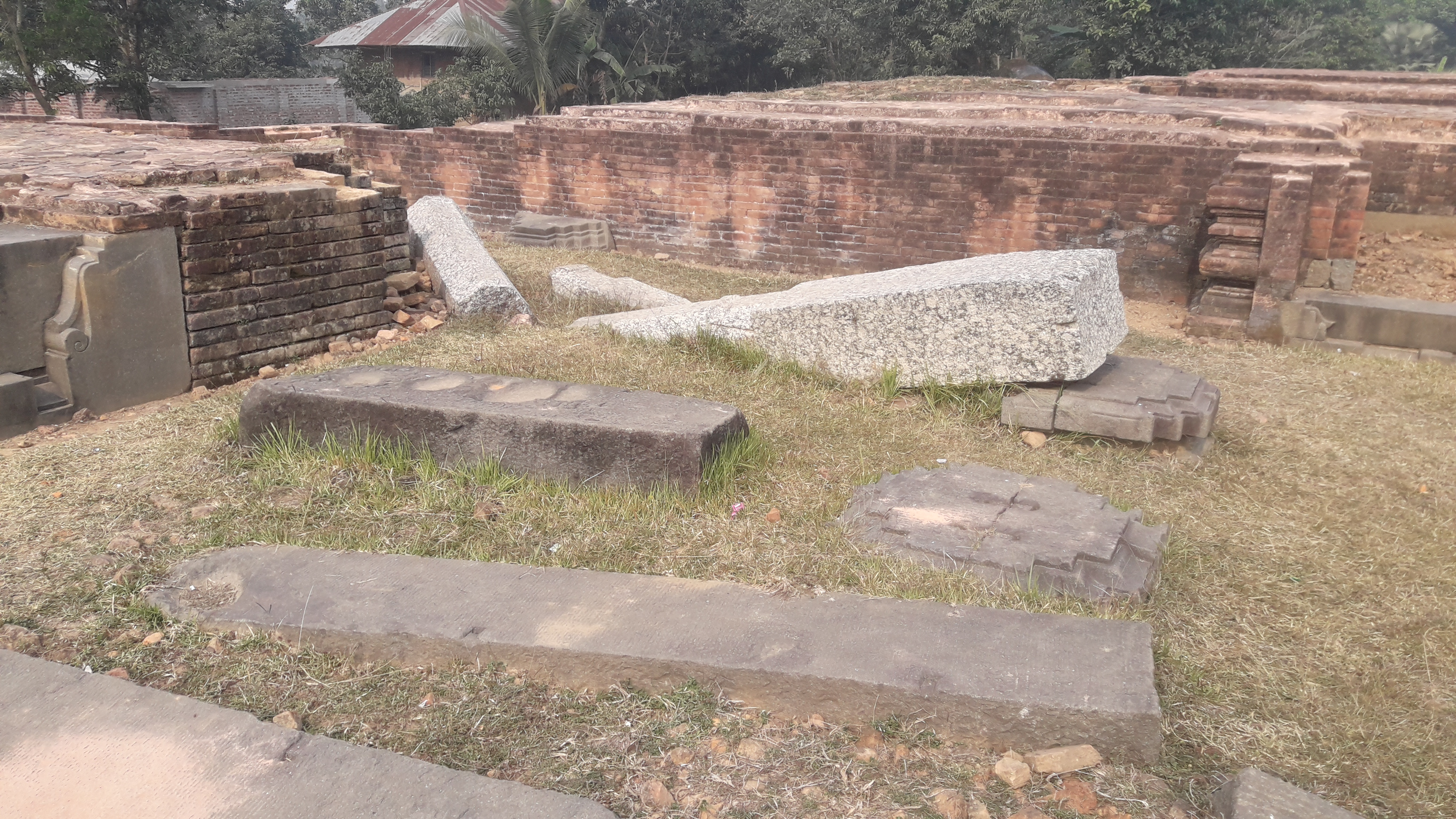
Fallen stone pillars

== See also ==
- List of archaeological sites in Bangladesh
- History of Bangladesh
