= Dakshin Shahbazpur Union =

South Shahbazpur Union দক্ষিণ শাহবাজপুর ইউনিয়ন
- Union Council
- No. 5 Dakshin Shahbazpur Union Council
- Location in Bangladesh
- Country: Bangladesh
- Division: Sylhet Division
- District: Moulvibazar District
- Upazila: Barlekha Upazila

Population
  - Total: 26,840
- Demonym: South Shahbazpuri
- Time zone: UTC+6 (BST)
- Website: shahbajpurdakshinup.moulvibazar.gov.bd

Dakshin Shahbazpur or South Shahbazpur (Bengali: দক্ষিণ শাহবাজপুর) is a Union Parishad under Barlekha Upazila of Moulvibazar District in the division of Sylhet, Bangladesh. It has an area of 40.46 square miles and a population of 26,840.

== History ==
The South Shahbazpur Upazila is named after its headquarters, the village of South Shahbazpur. Shahbazpur was formerly known as Kauwakona and home to the Jangdar clan, who were the local Hindu zamindars (landlords) located within the Panchakhanda pargana. Shyam Rai Jangdar's son, Swarup Ram Jangdar, Muluk Suwai was buried next to him after his death. introduced a vigraha (idol) site dedicated to Vasudeva located in the Kumar Saeed mauza. However, he later converted to Islam after visiting Delhi to discuss revenue with the emperor. Swarup Ram Jangdar was awarded the name Shahbaz Khan, subsequently establishing the Shahbazpur pargana, separating it from greater Panchakhanda. He later embarked on the Hajj pilgrimage to Mecca. At the age of eighty, Shahbaz Khan had his first and only son, Fateh Muhammad (c. 1700-1790s), who succeeded him as the Zamindar of Shahbazpur. The next zamindar of Shahbazpur was his son, Muhammad Fazil, and then his son, Muhammad Adil. Adil had no sons, and so it was inherited by his daughter, and then his grandson, Abdul Ghafur Chowdhury. Abdul Ghafur's son and successor, Nouman Muqit Chowdhury, was one of the local aristocrats.

The general preeminence of the Jangdar clan is displayed in a proverb recorded by the historians Achyut Charan Choudhury and Syed Murtaza Ali:

পাল, প্রচণ্ড, জাংদার। এই তিন মিরাশদার।

Pal, Prôchôṇḍô, Jangdar.
Ei tin mirashdar

Translated, this means "Pal, Prachanda, Jangdar. These are the three mirashdars." Thus, making reference to the Pal family, the descendants of Prachanda Khan and the unrelated Jangdar clan, the proverb states that there were no other mirashdars (Note: Mirashdar is a term referring to a landowner who pays taxes directly to the government.) beyond these families in the locality.

In August 2019, the Indian Border Security Force shot dead Abdus Shakur ibn Muraqib Ali, a South Shahbazpuri resident from Bobartal Majhgandhai.

== Administration ==
The union has roughly 40 villages divided into 9 wards and 14 mouzas.

Ward	Village	Population
1	Banikona	593
1	Deul	394
1	Ramchandrapur	96
1	Bagatikar	257
1	Bisrabond	786
1	Tajpur	201
1	Ghorua	425
2	Sujaul	5117
2	Panch Para	2399
2	Soriya	366
2	Kayasthashashan	105
3	Shahbazpur Tea Garden	1109
3	Balishkona	185
3	Sikrouni	115
3	Shuarartal	874
4	Bahadurpur Tea Garden	4942
4	Chandinagar	1879
4	Chandergul	728
5	Taradorom	1743
5	Muraul	1394
6	Bobartal	4942
7	Gholsa	3035
7	Baulerchowk	758
8	Gramthala	2652
9	Muhammadnagar	2939
9	Chotolekha Tea Garden	1486
9	Rahmaniya Tea Garden	47
9	New Palla	
?	Nalikhai Punji	536
?	Karaichara	297
?	Islamnagar	1258
?	Sreedharpur	1147
?	Gandhai	1622
?	Paku	102

== Demography ==
South Shahbazpur has a population of 26,840. 12,825 are men and 14,015 of the population are female. There are three graveyards for the deceased residents to be buried and these are Taradorom Central Cemetery, Muraul Central Cemetery and Sujaul Central Cemetery.

== Education ==
The Union has 9 state primary schools and 3 private primary schools. It has 5 high schools and 6 madrasas. The Baragul Qawmi Madrasa is home to an orphanage. Other madrasas include the Sujaul Senior Fazil Madrasha, Taradorom Women's Dakhil Madrasa and the Barlekha Jamia Islamiya Dakhil Madrasa. The literacy rate in the union is 54.3%.

== Economy and tourism ==
South Shahbazpur has three Haat bazaars; Taradorom Bazar, Muraul Bazar and Office Bazar. The Union has a significant number of emigrants in Saudi Arabia, Qatar, UAE, Greece, UK, France, Kuwait, Oman, Bahrain, Brazil, Spain, United States and Italy contributing to its economy. Mohammad Ataul Karim originates from this area. In recent times, coal deposits have been discovered in Bobartal.

Popular tourist sites include its four tea gardens; Shahbazpur, Bahadurpur, Chotolekha and Rahmaniya. The Union is home to 4 sports clubs in Taradorom, Gholsa, Muraul and Sujaul. The practice of Cockfighting competitions which take place in Gholsa School attracts media attention.

== Religion ==
There are 41 mosques in the Union. Some include:

- Taradorom Central Mosque, East Taradorom Jame Mosque, Taradorom Choumuhoni Jame Mosque, Taradorom Barathal Jame Mosque, Central Taradorom Panjegana, West Taradorom Jame Masjid
- Muraul Jame Mosque, Muraul Panjegana Mosque
- East Banikona Jame Mosque, West Banikona Jame Mosque
- Bagatikar Jame Mosque
- Ghorua Jame Mosque
- Bisrabond Jame Mosque, Bisrabond Pakhurgul Masjid
- Ulkanti Panjegana
- West Panchpara Jame Masjid, East Panchpara Jame Masjid, Central Panchpara Jame Masjid
- Sariya Jame Masjid
- Office Bazar Jame Masjid
- Sujaul Jame Masjid, Sujaul Dingal Jame Masjid
- Kayasthashashan Jame Masjid
- Shuararthal Jame Masjid, Shuararthal Panjegana of Hannan
- Shahbazpur Tea Garden Mosque

There are also 6 eidgahs in the union. These are Taradorom Shahi Eidgah, Muraul Eidgah, Sujaul Shahi Central Eidgah, East Taradorom Mosque Eidgah, Gholsa Shahi Eidgah and Bisrabond Eidgah.

== List of chairmen ==
List of chairmen
Number	Name	Term
01	Mosoddor Ali	26/2/1977 - 5/3/1984
02	Muhammad Ahmad Ali	11/3/1984- 10/2/1989
03	Mosoddor Ali	10/2/1989 - 10/1/1991
04	Muhammad Abdus Shahid	10/2/1991 - 10/2/1992
05	Muhammad Ahmad Ali	11/2/1992 - 3/2/1998
06	Muhammad Abdul Jabbar	4/2/1998 - 30/7/2011
07	Nahid Ahmad	31/7/2011 - ?
08	Shahab Uddin	present

== See also ==
- Divisions of Bangladesh
- Districts of Bangladesh
- Upazilas of Bangladesh
