= Pal family =

Bengali aristocratic family

Pal পাল
- Parent house: Pala dynasty
- Current region: Panchakhanda
- Earlier spellings: Pala
- Etymology: "Protector" (Sanskrit)
- Origin: Sylhet Division
- Founded: 12th century
- Founder: Kalidas Pal
- Final ruler: Ramjivan Pal
- Titles: Raja; Dewan; Rai Bahadur; Chowdhury
- Estates: Palbari, Beanibazar
- Cadet branches: Chowdhurys of Bahadurpur

The Pal family (Bengali: পাল বংশ; also spelt Pala) are a Bengali aristocratic family who historically held lands in what is now Sylhet, Bangladesh.

== History ==
External images
- Front view of the Pal palace
- Side view The Pal palace (locally known as the "Palbari") is located near the municipal town of Beanibazar and is presently in a dilapidated condition.

Among the most ancient families in their region, the Pals trace their descent from a branch of the imperial Pala dynasty of Bengal, claiming a 'Raja Mahipala' as their ancestor, though it is not known which of the Pala kings of this name is being referred to. The Pals became established in Sylhet by one Kumar Kalidas Pal in the 12th century CE. Kalidas, who may have migrated due to the disintegration of the Pala Empire, acquired land in Panchakhanda (in what is now Beanibazar sub-district), with the estate becoming hereditary among his descendants. The Pals initially ruled their territory as feudal monarchs, styling themselves with the royal title Raja. Around the 13th century CE (7th century BS), the Pal palace and the large dighi (reservoir) it sits beside were constructed by Kalidas's great-grandson, Varanasi Pal. However, three generations later, during the reign of Ramjivan Pal, the kingdom lost its independence, coming under the suzerainty of the Muslim rulers of Bengal.

In spite of this reduction in status, the family enjoyed considerable renown and success as private landowners. Under Pal governance, their territory (previously scarcely inhabited) was significantly developed and cultivated, allowing the migration of groups such as the Mahimals (who were led by their two Sardars Raghai and Basai) into the area. (Note: Mahimals subsequently maintained a presence in the region into modern times.) Successive members of the family became notable for their construction of dighi as well as their religious contributions, both through support of Brahmans as well as construction. One younger son, Pratap Chandra Pal, converted to Islam under the name "Prachanda Khan" and established his own separate territory, with his heirs becoming prominent landowners themselves; among his descendants are the Muslim Chowdhurys of Kala and Bahadurpur, also in Beanibazar.

The general preeminence of the Pal line is displayed in a proverb recorded by the historian Achyut Charan Choudhury:

পাল, প্রচণ্ড, জাংদার। এই তিন মিরাশদার।

Pal, Prôchôṇḍô, Jangdar.
Ei tin mirashdar

Translated, this means "Pal, Prachanda, Jangdar. These are the three mirashdars." Thus, making reference to the Pals, the descendants of Prachanda Khan and the unrelated Jangdar clan, the proverb states that there were no other mirashdars (Note: Mirashdar is a term referring to a landowner who pays taxes directly to the government.) beyond these families in the locality.

The influence of the Pals continued into the British era, with Munshi Hari Krishna Pal serving as Dewan to the District Collector of Sylhet. Krishnatay Dewanji, his younger brother, was the first individual in Sylhet to be awarded the title Rai Bahadur by the ruling government. The latter's son, Krishna Kishore Pal Chowdhury, founded the Bihani Bazar (Morning Market), from which the town of Beanibazar (now expanded into the sub-district) derives its name.

Other subsequent family members include activists Surath Pal Chowdury, his wife Arpana Pal Chowdhury and her sister Ashita Pal Chowdhury, who were involved in the Nankar Rebellion of 1949. Among the Bahadurpur branch were Najmul Islam Chowdhury and Abdul Muyeed Chowdhury, elected MLA's of Assam Provincial Legislature in 1923 and 1937 respectively, the brothers C. M. Shafi Sami (Bangladesh Foreign Secretary; 1999–2001) and AB Bank Chief Executive Officer C.M. Qais Sami, and Abdul Mumit Chowdhury (Bangladesh Election Commissioner; 1978–1986). Syed Mujtaba Ali and his brother Syed Murtaza Ali, both writers, were maternal descendants of the family.

== See also ==
- Nidhanpur copperplate inscription, Panchakhanda
