= Baghprachanda Khan =

Baghprachanda Khan বাগপ্রচণ্ড খাঁ Bagprachanda Khan
- Village
- Country: Bangladesh
- Division: Sylhet Division
- District: Sylhet District
- Upazila: Beanibazar Upazila
- Union: Lauta Union
- Ward: 1
- Named after: Prachanda Khan

Government
  - Ward Member: Muhammad Abdul Bari Dudu Miah
- Time zone: UTC+6 (BST)

Baghprachanda Khan (Bengali: বাগপ্রচণ্ড খাঁ, romanized: bagprôcôṇḍô khã) is a village and mouza under Lauta Union, Beanibazar Upazila of Sylhet District, Bangladesh.

== Administration ==
Baghprachanda Khan is a part of the Ward 1 of no. 11 Lauta union council of Beanibazar Upazila.

== History ==
Pratapchandra Pal, the youngest of the five sons of Yadavananda Pal, settled in this area after converting from Hinduism to Sunni Islam and being given the name Prachanda Khan. He excavated a large dighi (reservoir) in the area, which was named Bagh Prachanda Khan (Garden of Prachanda Khan), later being established as a mouza. His descendants continue to inhabit the village, and were at one point known as the Chowdhuries of Kala within Panchakhanda pargana. Prachanda Khan was succeeded by his son Gauhar Khan, whose son was Majlis Agowan, whose son was Majlis Ikhtiyar, whose son was Majlis Khan, whose son was Mabarim Khan, whose son was Masum Khan, whose son was Fateh Muhammad, whose son was Faiz Muhammad, whose son was Safar Muhammad, whose son was Abdul Ali, whose son was Abdul Majid, whose son was Abdul Wahid, whose son and successor was Abdul Khaliq Chowdhury. Haji Moulvi Mohsen Chowdhury of this family was the father of Amatul Mannan Khatun, mother of Syed Mujtaba Ali and Syed Murtaza Ali.

The general preeminence of Prachanda Khan's clan is displayed in a proverb recorded by the historians Achyut Charan Choudhury and Syed Murtaza Ali:

পাল, প্রচণ্ড, জাংদার। এই তিন মিরাশদার।

Pal, Prôchôṇḍô, Jangdar.
Ei tin mirashdar

Translated, this means "Pal, Prachanda, Jangdar. These are the three mirashdars." Thus, making reference to the original Pal family, the descendants of Prachanda Khan and the unrelated Jangdar clan, the proverb states that there were no other mirashdars (Note: Mirashdar is a term referring to a landowner who pays taxes directly to the government.) beyond these families in the locality.

Baghprachanda Khan's Bazaar later became a notable trade centre of Karimganj subdivision. It was also an important centre of the Nankar Rebellion. In the late 1930s, the Indian Imperial Police tortured and robbed Nankar rebels in Baghprachanda Khan village. On 18 May 1940, Baghprachanda Khan (along with the rest of the Beanibazar thana) was transferred from Karimganj subdivision to Sylhet subdivision.

In 2013, there were allegations of teacher harassment at the West Baghprachanda Khan Primary School.
