= Mathiura BL High School =

Coordinates: 24.8177°N 92.1305°E

Mathiura BL High School Bengali: মাথিউরা দ্বিপাক্ষিক উচ্চ বিদ্যালয়

Information
- Established: 1964; 61 years ago
- Years: 6-10

Mathiura Bilateral High School (Bengali: মাথিউরা দ্বিপাক্ষিক উচ্চ বিদ্যালয়, romanized: Mathiura Dipakkhik Uchcho Biddaloy), is one of the oldest schools in Beanibazar Upazila, Sylhet, Bangladesh. It is one of the non-government high schools in Sylhet Division. It was established in 1964. It is located at Mathiura Bazar in Mathiura Union.

== Education ==
Bangladesh Education Board approved, S.S.C Secondary School Certificate education start from year six to year ten.
