= Ajay Bhattacharya =

Ajay Bhattacharya may refer to:

- Ajay Bhattacharya (revolutionary) (1914–1999), Bangladeshi communist activist, political organiser and writer from Sylhet
- Stint (producer), Canadian record producer, songwriter and engineer, born Ajay Bhattacharyya
