= Shahbazian =

Shahbazian or Shahbazyan (Persian: شهبازیان) is an Armenian/Iranian patronymic surname. Related surname: Shahbazi. It is derived from the word "Shahbaz" + patronymic suffix "-ian"/"-yan" meaning "descendant of".

The surname may refer to:

- Edmen Shahbazyan (born 1997), American mixed martial artist of Armenian descent
- Fereydoon Shahbazyan (1942–2025), Iranian performing musician, composer, and conductor
- Sebo Shahbazian, Iranian soccer player
- Suzanna Shahbazian, Canadian rhythmic gymnast
