= Srihatta Literary Society =

Shrihatta Sahitya Parishad শ্রীহট্ট সাহিত্য পরিষদ
- Location: Sylhet, Bangladesh, Bangladesh
- Established: 1935

Srihatta Literary Society or commonly known as Shrihatta Sahitya Parishad (Bengali: শ্রীহট্ট সাহিত্য পরিষদ) is the oldest literary and cultural organization in the Sylhet region. The organization was founded in 1935. As the first cultural organization in the region, it made a significant contribution to the creation of poet and litterateur at that time; Its contribution to the creation of writers like Achyut Charan Choudhury or Dewan Mohammad Azraf is noteworthy.
