= Purush Pal =

Village in Bangladesh

Purush Pal is a village in Mathiura Union, Beanibazar Upazila, Sylhet district, Bangladesh.

== History ==
There two different traditional anecdotal accounts as to how the name Purushpal became into existence and how the village was formed.

First, it is believed that in Middle Ages, a group of Brahman men, i.e. purush, came from northern parts of India and established a settlement, which eventually developed into a village. As it was predominantly a settlement of purush, i.e. men; their zealous effort to befriend people from neighbouring villages, particularly women from different tribes and caste earned them the reputation of friend, i.e. paal; thus their settlement attained the name of Purushpaal, deriving from the compound of words purush + paal = Purushpaal.

Second, the name Purush Pal came from Paresh Paul, who was the founder of the village by the end of the 13th century. As Shah Jalal arrived in Sylhet in 1303 CE with his 360 dervish disciples, the local inhabitants of Bangladesh, particularly from animist and pagan denomination, had begun to accept Islam as their region. Likewise, the people of Pareshpaul embraced Islam as their religion; this way, most of the village inhabitants became Muslim. However, a sizeable village population remained Hindu, who sold their village homestead after 1947 and migrated to urban parts of the country, mainly to the city of Sylhet, Moulvibazar, Srimangal, Sunamganj and Chhatak. It is said that some of the wealthy Hindus have migrated to Shillong, Karimganj and Kolkata in India. There is no written record as to where the village pioneers, Paul Family, has migrated and settled.

== Geography ==
Purush Pal village is located in Mathiura Union, Beanibazar Upazila, at 24.8250°N 92.1625°E. The total area of around 25 km^{2}.

== Demographics ==
According to the 2011 Bangladesh census, Purush Pal had 102 households and a population of 590. 8.8% of the population was under the age of 5. The literacy rate (age 7 and over) was 67.1%, compared to the national average of 51.8%.

Most people in Purush Pal practice Islam.

== Economy ==
81% of the employed population are engaged in agricultural work.

== Education ==
There is one primary school and one madrasa in Purush Pal.

- Purush Pal Wasiria Government Primary School

Purush Pal Wasiria Government Primary School was established in 1955. Again it was rebuilt in 1980. Name of school named by (Wasir Ali)he is the founder of school. Currently it is run by the government of Bangladesh. It has good reputation and good academic results. Academic education starts/available in this school from year one to year five.

- Purush Pal Hafizia Madrasa

This is an Islamic School in Purush Pal village. Villagers who have immigrated and live in the UK financially helped to found this school in around 1995. Aim was to grant free Islamic education about Quran Memorizing (Hafiz).

== See also ==
- List of villages in Bangladesh
