= Beani Bazar Government College =

College in Beanibazar, Bangladesh

Beanibazar Govt. College
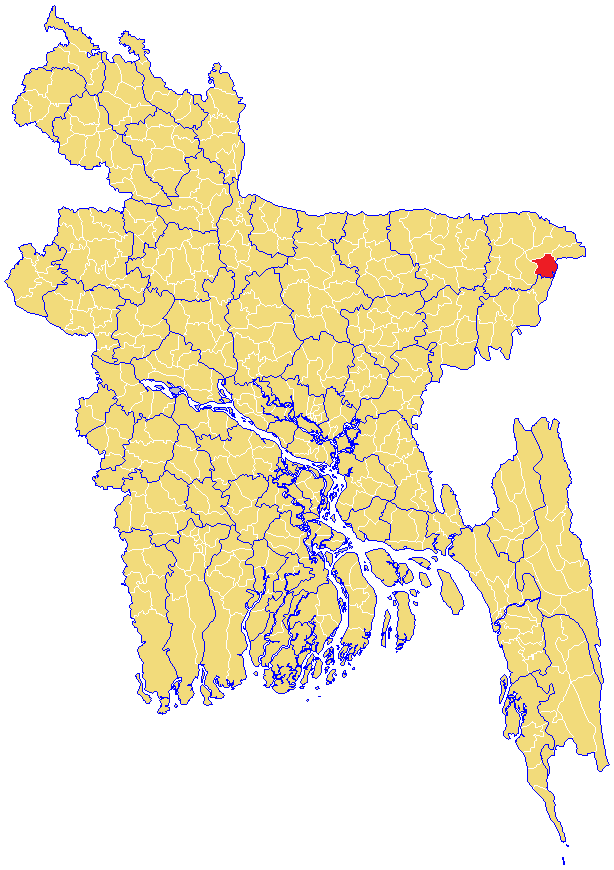
- Location: 3170, Bangladesh; 24.8214°N 92.1566°E

Beani Bazar Government College is a college in Beanibazar Upazila, Bangladesh.
