= Shahbaz =

Shahbaz (Persian: شهباز) is a Persian word referring to the fabled guardian bird Shahbaz. It is also a common name in Iran, Pakistan, Afghanistan and Tajikistan.

Shahbaz, Shabaz or Shehbaz may refer to:

== People with the given name ==
- Shahbaz Bhatti (1968–2011), Christian Pakistani politician
- Shahbaz Khan (actor) (born 1966), formerly Haider Amir, Indian actor
- Shahbaz Khan (cricketer) (born 1991), Pakistani cricketer
- Shahbaz Khan (hydrologist), Australian climatologist and hydrologist
- Shahbaz Khan Bugti (1897–1989), tribal chief in Balochistan
- Shahbaz Khan Kamboh (1529–1599), Mughal general of Akbar
- Shehbaz Sharif (born 1951), Pakistani politician
- Shahbaz Tariq (born 1948), Norwegian politician
- Ali Mohammad "Shahbaz" (1939–1996), Indian poet

== People with the surname ==
- General Shahbaz Khan Kamboh (1529–1599), Mughal Empire general
- Parsegh Shahbaz (1883–1915), Ottoman Armenian lawyer, political activist, journalist, and columnist
- Hafizullah Shabaz Khail (born 1946), Afghan prisoner in US detention at Guantanamo Bay, Cuba
- John C. Shabaz (1931–2012), United States federal judge
- Lal Shahbaz Qalandar (1177–1274), Sufi saint, philosopher and poet
- Michael Shabaz (born 1987), American tennis player
- Muhammad Shahbaz (born 1972), Pakistani hockey player
- Philip Shahbaz (born 1974), American actor

== Places ==
- Dakshin Shahbazpur Union, union council in Moulvibazar district, Bangladesh
- Dasht Shahbaz, historical place in Balochistan province, Pakistan
- Shahbaz Azmat Khel, town in Khyber-Pakhtunkhwa, Pakistan
- Shahbaz Garhi, historic site in Khyber-Pakhtunkhwa, Pakistan
- Shahbaz Khel, village in Khyber-Pakhtunkhwa, Pakistan

== Other uses ==
- Shahbazpur (disambiguation), list of places named after the word/name Shahbaz
- Shahbaz FC, an association football club associated with Shahin Tehran F.C.
- Hajj Shahbazkhan Mosque, Kermanshah, Iran
- Shahbaz (bird), mythological bird
- Shabaz (band), American qawwali band
- Shahbaz Garhi, site of certain pillars of Ashoka in Pakistan
