= Hena Das =

Bangladeshi politician and activist

- হেনা দাস
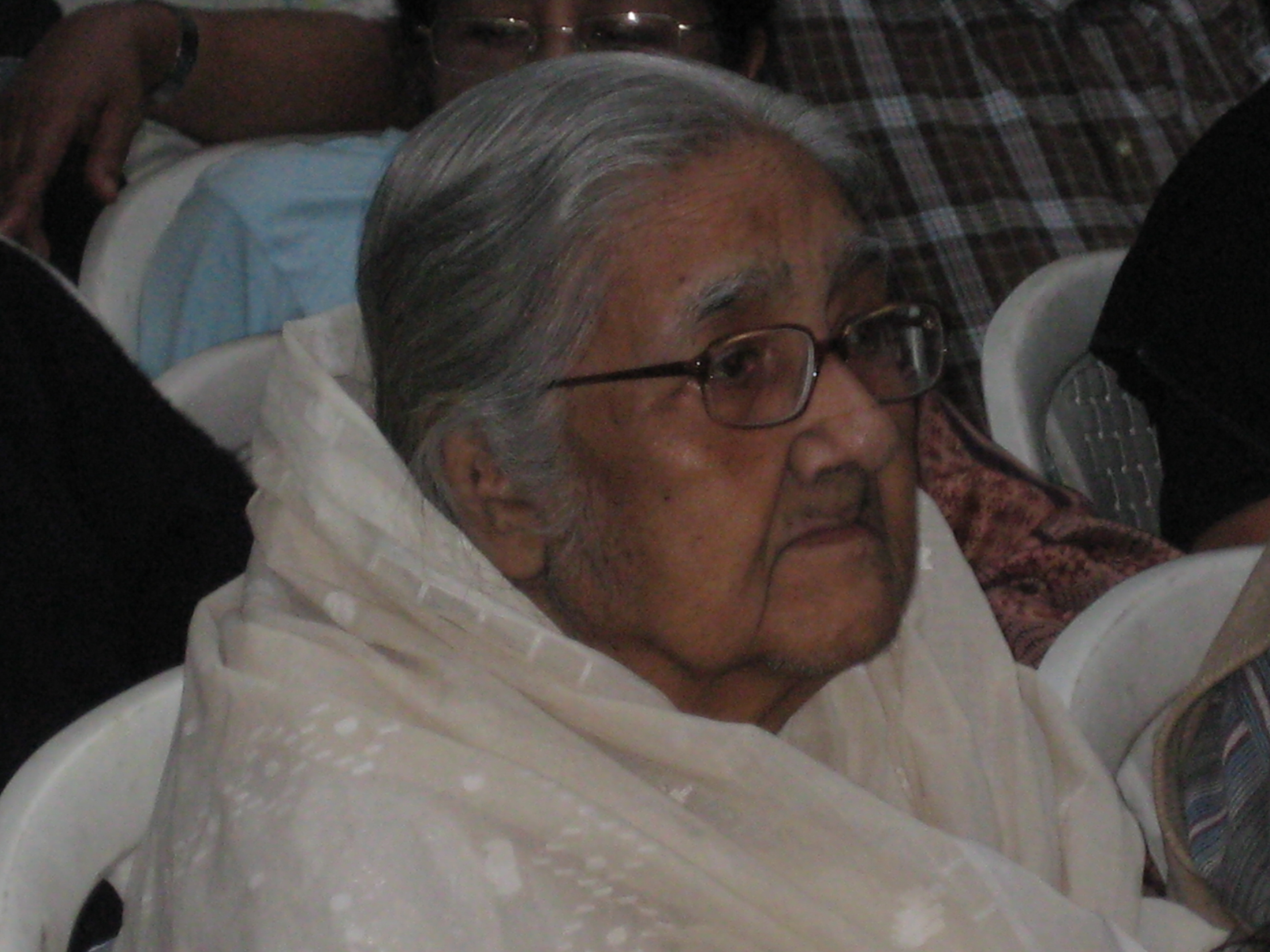
- Born: 12 February 1924; Sylhet, Bengal Presidency, British India
- Died: 20 July 2009 (aged 85); Dhaka, Bangladesh
- Education: MA (Bengali)
- Alma mater: University of Dhaka
- Political party: Communist Party of Bangladesh
- Spouse: Rohinee Das
- Awards: Begum Rokeya Padak

Hena Das (Bengali: হেনা দাস; 12 February 1924 – 20 July 2009) was a Bangladeshi women's right activist and leftist. She was involved in Nankar Movement in 1948 and Bangladesh Liberation War in 1971. In 2001 she was awarded Begum Rokeya Padak by the Government of Bangladesh for empowering women and raising women's issues.

== Early life and education ==
Das was born in Sylhet town to her father lawyer Roy Bahadur Satishchandra Datta and her mother Manorama Datta. She passed matriculation examination in 1940 from Government Agragami Girls' High School (later Pilot School), intermediate exam in 1942, and obtained bachelor's degree from Sylhet Mahila College in 1947. She earned her master's degree in Bangla in 1966 from University of Dhaka.

== Career ==
Das joined Communist Party of India in 1942 and later was involved with its successor Communist Party of Bangladesh (CPB). She got involved with the Teachers' Association in 1978 and was the elected general secretary and vice president for 14 years. She served as one of the members of the first education commission headed by Muhammad Qudrat-i-Khuda.

Das served as the President of Bangladesh Mohila Parishad (BMP) for eight years after the death of Begum Sufia Kamal in 1999.

Das died on 20 July 2009, in Bangladesh Medical University. She was cremated with state honor in Narayanganj.

== Personal life ==
In 1948 Das married another communist leader Rohinee Das. They had a daughter Champa Zaman.

== Works ==
- Smritimoy Dingulo (2004)
- Amar Shikkha O Shikkhokota Jibon
- Smritimoy Ekattor
- Pancham Purush
- Char Purusher Kahini
