= Angura Muhammadpur =

Coordinates: 24.8681°N 92.1185°E

Angura Muhammadpur আঙ্গুরা মোহাম্মদপুর Maodpur
- Village
- Interactive map of Angura Muhammadpur
- Country: Bangladesh
- Division: Sylhet
- District: Sylhet
- Upazila: Beanibazar
- Union Parishad: Kurarbazar
- Ward: 3

Government
  - Ward Leader: Delwar Hussain

Population
  - Total: 2,134

Angura Muhammadpur (Bengali: আঙ্গুরা মোহাম্মদপুর) is a village in Beanibazar Upazila of Sylhet District, Bangladesh. The village, also known by its nickname Maodpur, is situated in the 3rd Ward of the Kurarbazar Union Council. Angura Mohammad Pur is renowned for its privately funded madrasa, a notable landmark in Sylhet District, called Jamia Madania Angura Muhammadpur Madrasa. This institution is supported by both local villagers and expatriates. The village is geographically divided by the Kushiyara River and the Khoroti Canal. A significant number of residents have emigrated to Europe, the United States, and the Middle East. The village has a population of 2,134.

Despite significant setbacks in the past, primarily due to natural flooding of the rivers and canals, there has been a resurgence in agriculture in the village, driven by the implementation of affordable new farming technologies. Currently, 80% of the agricultural land is utilized for growing rice and other crops. Particularly on the northern bank of the river, locals are actively working to optimize the farming areas.

However, Angura Mohammed Pur and its neighboring areas continue to rely heavily on foreign remittances as their main source of income. This dependency is particularly pronounced among young adults, who often drop out of school after secondary education and remain jobless waiting to go abroad. Cultural norms and attitudes that prioritize migration over academia, professional careers, or entrepreneurship exacerbate this issue. Additionally, linguistic biases further promote and value being a migrant worker over pursuing educational and professional opportunities.

As a result, the community suffers from a lack of local skilled professionals and economic opportunities. Those who migrate often rely on manual labour as their main means of income due to the limited skills and education acquired before leaving. However, many migrants eventually pursue entrepreneurial opportunities once abroad. The village heavily depends on remittances from its migrant population to sustain its economy.

The village has limited natural resources and relies on its market, Farir Bazar, for local commerce. Additionally, the community has a cemetery, Angura Muhammadpur Tila Bari Qoborstan, which serves as a significant local landmark..
