= Shahbazpur =

Shahbazpur or Shahbajpur or Shahabajpur can refer to places:

== In Bangladesh ==
- Shahbazpur Union, an area of Shibganj Upazila, Chapai Nawabganj District
- Shahbazpur Union, Sarail, an area of Sarail Upazila, Brahmanbaria District
- Shahbazpur, Brahmanbaria, a village in Shahbazpur Union, Sarail
- Two areas of Barlekha Upazila in Maulvibazar District
  - Dakshin Shahbazpur Union
  - Uttar Shahbajpur Union
- A channel of the Meghna River that empties into the sea in Bhola District
- Bhola Island, also called Dakshin Shahbazpur Island, in Bhola District

== In India ==
- Shahbazpur, Bihar, a village in Araria district
- A village in Mandawar, Uttar Pradesh

== In Pakistan ==
- Shahbazpur (village), a village in Gujrat District
