= Mathiura Union =

Union council in Bangladesh

Kholagram Mathiura union is a union parishad in Beanibazar Upazila, Sylhet District, Bangladesh.

== Geography ==
Mathiura Union is located at 24.8250°N 92.1625°E. It has 27,089 units of household and a total area of 253.22 km^{2}.

== Demographics ==
As of the 1991 Bangladesh census, Mathiura Union had a population of around 30,547, 49.5% of whom are male and 50.5% are female.

== List of villages ==
- Arengabad
- Bejgram (Nasirabad)
- Duakha
- Dulovkha
- Dudbokshi
- Kandi Gram
- Khola Gram
- Menarai
- Nal Bohar
- Pochim Per
- Purbo Per
- Purush Pal
- Raybashi
- Sheiklal (Sutton)
- Sutar Kandi
- Uttor Per

== List of high schools ==
- Mathiura Dipakhik High School
- Nalbohor High School
- Mathiura Girls High School
- The New Generation Ideal High School

== List of madrasah ==
- Mathiura Senior Fazil Madrasa
- Mathiura Bazar Hafiziya Madrasa
- Purush Pal Hafizia Madrasa
- Nalbohor Miftahul Jannah Madrasah

== List of primary schools ==
- Aurangabad Primary School
- Bejgram Primary School
- Centre Mathiura Govt Model Primary School
- Doakha Primary School
- Dudbokshi Primary School
- Raybashi (govt.)primary school
- Kandi Gram Primary School
- Khola Gram Primary School
- Menarai Primary School (first primary school in korimgang mohokuma).
- Nal Bohar Primary School
- Pochim Per Primary School
- Kandro Mathiura Govt Primary School
- Purush Pal Wasiria Government Primary School
- Sheikhlal Primary School
- Sutar Kandi Primary School
- Uttor Per Primary School
- Sheikhlal Primary School

== Health care: hospital ==
- Mathiura Bazar Hospital
