= Abdul Mumit Chowdhury =

Bangladeshi judge (1916–1997)

Justice of the High Court Division of Bangladesh

Personal details
- Born: 24 July 1916
- Died: 13 August 1997 (aged 81)
- Profession: Judge

Abdul Mumit Chowdhury (24 July 1916 – 13 August 1997) was a Bangladeshi judge of the High Court Division of the Bangladesh Supreme Court, as well as an Election Commissioner of Bangladesh.

== Career ==
Chowdhury served as a Judge of the High Court Division till 1976 when he was forcibly retired after President Ziaur Rahman changed the age of retirement from 65 to 62.

Chowdhury served as an Election Commissioner of Bangladesh from 20 October 1978 to 31 December 1986.

== Personal life and death ==
Chowdhury was born on 24 July 1916 to Abdur Raqib Chowdhury. He belonged to the Chowdhuries of Bahadurpur, an Islamised branch of the Pal family of Panchakhanda. Chowdhury married Masuma Khanum Chowdhury, with whom he had seven children. He died on 13 August 1997, at the age of 81.
