= Nidhanpur copperplate inscription =

Inscription from ancient Indian subcontinent

Nidhanpur Inscription
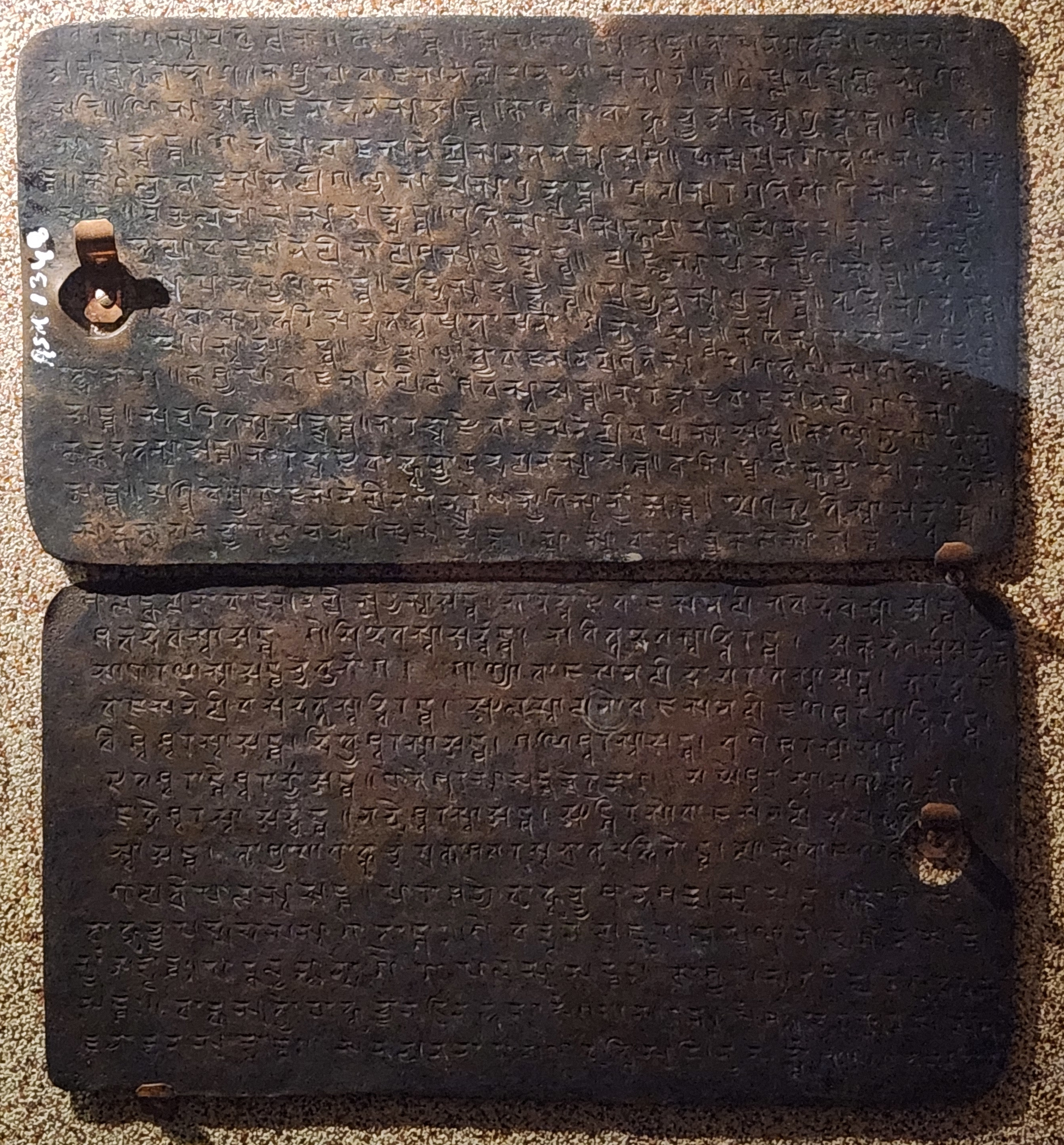
- The Nidhanpur Inscription (Plates 4/5 and 6) of Bhaskaravarman
- Material: Copper
- Discovered: 29 December 1912; Nidhanpur (in present-day Sylhet District, Bangladesh)

The Nidhanpur copperplate inscription of the 7th-century Kamarupa king Bhaskaravarman is a renewal of a land grant to Brahmins in the Chandrapuri vishaya somewhere in the Sylhet district of present-day Bangladesh originally settled by the king's great-great-grandfather Bhutivarman. It records land grants to more than two hundred vaidika brahmanas belonging to 56 gotras. The copper plates were found in Panchakhanda pargana (now in Bangladesh) where, according to historians, the actual granted lands were located. This kamrupi inscription contains the names of donees which are more than two hundred in numbers.

The inscriptions recorded by Bhaskaravarman in different parts of India provide a detailed account of his rule and associate events. It was customary among the kings of Kamarupa to issue seals for every major event related to the kingdom be they giving land grants to Brahmins or winning a war.

== Discovery ==
The copper plates (7 plates and 1 seal) were discovered by one Sheikh Musharraf, a cultivator, on 29 December 1912, in the village of Nidhanpur (near Supatala village) in the Panchakhanda pargana (currently Beanibazar) in the eastern fringes of Sylhet in present-day Bangladesh. The cultivator then sold the plates to different persons. Thinking that they were a clue to the location of a hidden treasure, he took the plates to a local landholder who recognised them for what they were and brought them to the attention of authorities in Silchar in present-day Assam, India.

== Translation ==
The following is the translation of the inscription by Padmanath Bhattacharya Vidya Vinod:

Om. (Verse 1.) Having saluted the god who is lovely with the moon as head-gear. the wielder of the bow (pinaka), adorned with particles of ashes, I once again make clear (what was already) plain words (i.e. of the destroyed plates) for the benefit of the (spiritually) prosperous Brahmans.

(Line 2.) Hail. From the camp located at Karnasuvarna, with the appropriate epithet of victory owing to possession of splendid ships, elephants horses and foot-soldiers.

(V.2.) Victorious is the form of the great Lord (Mahadeva), never forsaken (in contemplation by the devotees), bedecked with its own splendour, that has a girdle made of the lord of snakes, (and) that destroyed the body of Kama (Cupid) at a mere glance.

(V.3.) Victorious is (also) Dharma (Religion), the sole friend of the creation, the cause of prosperity in both the worlds (this and the next), whose form is the good of others, unseen (yet) whose existence is inferred from the results.

(V.4.) Naraka, the chief of the rulers of the earth, was the son of the wielder of the Chakra (i.e. Vishnu), who with a view to lift up the Earth from (beneath) the Ocean, assumed the distinguished form of a boar.

(V.5.) From that Naraka, by whom naraka (hell) was never seen, was born king Bhagadatta, the friend of Indra, who challenged in fight Vijaya (i.e. Arjuna), renowned for conquests.

(V.6.) Of that killer of (his) enemies (there) was a son named Vajradatta whose course was like (that of) the thunderbolt (Vajra), who with an army of uninterrupted progress always pleased in fight the performer of hundred sacrifices (i.e. Indra).

(V.7.) When the kings of his family having enjoyed the position (of rulers) for three thousand years had (all) attained the condition or gods, Pushyavarman became the lord of the world.

(V.8.) His son was Samudravarman, who was like a fifth samudra (Ocean), during whose reign there was no anarchy, shining with gems, and quick in duels.

(V.9.) That king had a son born of (his queen) Dattadevi, (named) Balavarman, whose force and armour never broke up and whose army would easily marchagainst enemies.

(V.10.) His son born of (queen) Ratnavati was the king named Kalayanavarman, who was not the abode of even very small faults.

(V.11.) From him (queen) Gandharvavati begot a son Ganapati (by name) who was incessantly raining gifts as (the god) Ganapati (rains) ichor, who was endowed with innumerable qualities, for the extermination of strife (as Ganapati) is born to destroy the Kali age.

(V.12.) His queen Yajnavati, brought forth a son Mahendravarman, as the sacrificial fire (produces) fire, who was the repository of all sacrificial rites (like fire).

( V.13.) From him who mastered his self, Suvrata generated a son Narayanavarman for the stability (of the rule; of the world, who like Janaka (or his father) was well versed in the principles of the philosophy of the (supreme) Self.

(V.14.) From him, Devavati, like Prakriti from Purusha, bore Mahabhutavarman, the sixth Mahabhuta (element) as it were, for the steady succession of (all) the properties.

(V.15.) His son was Chandramukha, who was charming by (possessing) all the arts as the moon (by the digits), whom Vijnanavati brought forth, as the Sky did (the moon), a dispeller of (all) gloom(as the moon dispels the darkness).

(V.16.) Thereafter (queen) Bhogavati of (good) enjoyment became the cause (of birth) of Sthitavarman, the supporter of the world, who had innumerable (sources of) enjoyment, (just as) Bhogavati (the city of the Snakes of the nether regions) is (the source) of prosperity of the chief of the Snakes, the supporter of the earth, who has a myriad of hoods.

(V.17.) From that king of unfathomable nature, of innumerable gems, and the spouse of the (goddess) Lakshmi, was born Sri-Mriganka, who had no blemish, just as the moon, free from spots, is born from the milky ocean, whose substance is unfathomable, whose pearls cannot be counted, and from which Lakshmi was produced.

(V.18.) His (i.e. Sthitavarman's) son king Susthitavarman was born of Nayanadevi, he who held the kingdom in his own hand, and was renowned as Sri Mriganka.

(V.19.) By whom was given away to supplicants as if it were (a clod of) earth, that shining Lakshmi (i.e. wealth) whom (god) Hari like a miser bears with joy in his bosom.

(V.20.) From him Syamadevi,(divine) like that goddess (Syama) of the Krita (i.e. golden) age, generated a son Supratishthitavarman, the moon as it were to dispel (all) gloom.

(V.21.) Whose prosperity was for the benefit of others, who was possessed of elephants and attended by the chief among the learned, and possessed of a well established capital like a kulachala, whose height is for the benefit of others, which is haunted by the chief of Vidyadharas, is rich in elephants, and has a ridge.

(V.22.) The same Syamadevi also brought forth his younger brother Sri-Bhaskaravarman, who like the sun was of incalculable rime and the abode of all light.

(V. 23.) Who though being only one, is, on account of his character, much and simultaneously reflected in the hearts of people, pure like mirrors turned toward, him.

(V.24.) Whose mark (i.e. picture) was seen in the houses of kings, untarnished on account of great lustre, like the disc of the sun in several water pots.

(V.25.) Who is without cruelty, easily accessible, of immense effects, and the soles of whose feet are surrounded by people who resort to his protection, like the wish-yielding tree which holds no snakes, which is well growing, abounds in rich fruits, and whose roots are surrounded by people who want shade.

(Lines 34-44.) Moreover he (Bhaskaravarman, who has been) created by the hold lotus-born (god), the a same of the rise, the arranging and the destruction of the Universe, for the proper organization of the duties of (various) castes and stages (of life) that had become mixed up; who by (his) rise has made the circle of (related) powers become attached like the Lord of the World (the Sun), whose disc becomes coloured when it rises; who has revealed the light of the Arya religion by dispelling the accumulated darkness of (this) Kali age by making is judicious application of his revenues (like the sun that dispels the accumulated darkness in the Kali age by spreading the mass of its pleasant rays), who has equalled the prowess of the whole ring of his feudatories by the strength of his own arum; who has devised many a way of enjoyment for his hereditary subjects, whose (loyal) devotion (to him) was augmented by his steadiness (of purpose), modesty and affability; who is adorned with a wonderful ornament of splendid fame made of the flowery words of praise variously composed by hundreds of kings vanquished by him in battle; whose virtuous activities, like (those of) Sivi were applied in making gifts for the benefit of others; whose powers, as (of) a second preceptor of the gods (Brihaspati), were recognised by other; on account of (his) skill in dividing and applying the means of politics that appear in suitable moments; whose own conduct was adorned by learning, valour, patience, prowess and good actions; who was avoided by faults as if they were overcome on account of (his) taking to the other (i.e. Virtue's) side; by whom the Lakshmis (deities of luck) of Kamrarupa were, as it were, attracted with a staunch incessant excessive passion of love; to whom was exhibited, with a fast embrace, the course of love for the abhigamikagunas (by the Lakshmi of Kamarupa drawn by an excessive sentiment of constant affection) who is, as it were, the breath of the holy Dharma whose person has been seized by the powerful Kali (Iron Age), the abode of politics and good qualities, the receptacle of friends, the shelter of the terrified, the abode of good luck, whose dignified power was shown by the elevated rank obtained in order of succession from (Naraka) the son of Vasumati (Earth), the king of kings, the illustrious Bhaskaravarman, in sound health, commands the present and the future district officers, as well as the courts of justice in thri district of Chandrapuri (thus): let it be known to you (all) that the land of the Mayurasalamalgraha (grant to the Brahmanas) lying within this district, granted (earlier) by issuing a copper-plate charter by king Bhutivarman has become liable to revenue on account of the loss of the copper-plates. So by the Maharaja (Bhaskaravarman), having informed the senior respectable persons and having issued orders for making a fresh copper plate grant, the land has been awarded to the Porahmanas, who have been already enjoying the grant, in the manner of Bhumi-chidra, so that no tax is levied on it as long as the sun, the moon and the earth will endure. Here the names of the Brahmanas (i.e., donees) areas follows: (lines 34 to 54)

Seven shares (amsah) are (allotted) for the purpose of bali (worship), care (oblation) and satra (hospitality). The produce of the land, found as an extension (due to the drying up) of the Kausika river, wide go to the Brahmanas, the donees of the grant but the land, found as an extension (due to the drying up) of the Gangini shall be equally shared by the Porahmanas as recorded. These are the boundaries: to the east lies the dry Kausika, to the south-west, that very dry Kausika, marked by a hewn fig tree, to the west now the boundary of Gangini, to the north west a potter's pit, and the said Gangini, sent westward, to the north a large, jatali tree; to the north-east the pond of the controlling tradesman Khasoka, and the dry Kausika. The officer issuing hundred commands in Sri Gopala who has received the five great sadbas. The officers who mark the boundaries are the headman of the Chandrapuri (named Sri Ksikunda, the dispute-settler (nyayakaranika) Janardanasvanin, the controlling officer (Vyarahari) Haradtta and the clerk (Kayastha) Dundunatha, and others. The composer and writer of the grant is Vasuvarma. The master of the treasury is the Mahasamanta Divakaraprabha. Tax-collector is Dattakarapurna. The copper-smith (i.e., the maker of the plates) is Kaliya. (lines 126-136)

The giver of land rejoices in heaven for sixty-thousand years and he who confiscates or assents (to confiscation) lives in hell for the same period. (v. 26) One who confiscate the land given by himself or by others, becomes work of the fifth and rots with the manes. (v. 27)

Since after the burning of the plates, these newly written letters are (obviously) different in form (from the letters of the earlier grant) they are not (to be respected as) forged.' (v. 28)

== See also ==
- Kamarupa of Bhaskaravarman
- Pal family of Panchakhanda
