= Revolt of Radharam =

1786 insurrection in India

The Revolt of Radharam, also known as the Chargola Uprising of 1786 or the Pratapgarh Rebellion, was an insurrection against the East India Company which took place in 1786. It was perpetrated by Radharam, the Zamindar of Chargola, Karimganj in what is now the Indian state of Assam. The revolt was one of the earliest struggles against British authority in Northeast India.

== Background ==
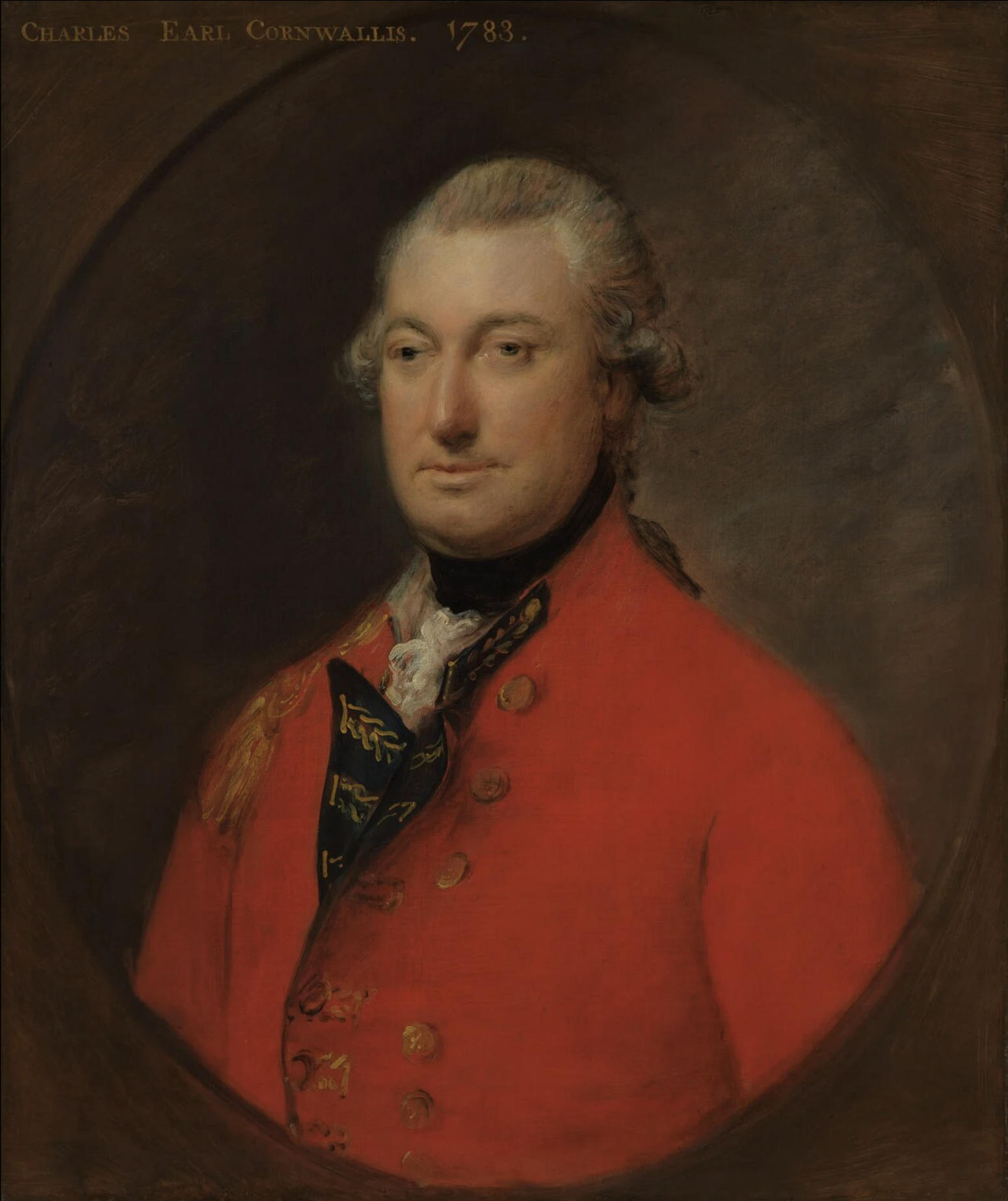
Lord Cornwallis enacted Permanent Settlement, which stirred tensions between local zamindars such as Radharam.

The initial factors of the revolt may be traced to the 1760s, when Radharam Datta, who was a Bengali Hindu from the village of Taltala, established himself at an area named Chargola, located at the tri-juncture between Sylhet, Tripura and the Mizo Hills. Chargola fell under the domain of the Zamindar of Pratapgarh, Ghulam Ali Choudhury, a descendant of the regions former rulers. (Note: Ghulam Ali Choudhury was a great-grandson of Sultan Muhammad, himself a nephew of the last king of Pratapgarh, Aftab Uddin.) Here, Radharam operated a successful business selling various commodities and provisions. One of his customers was the Zamindar himself, to whom he sold provisions on credit when Choudhury lacked the funds, as well as occasionally loaning money. As collateral against these increasing debts, Choudhury promised Radharam ever greater amounts of land from his estate. By the time Ghulam Ali Choudhury died, Radharam was poised to become his chief beneficiary.

However, the late Zamindar's son, Ghulam Raja Choudhury, believed that Radharam had cheated his father and went to the British Sadr Nizamat in Calcutta to contest the inheritance. The Courts ruled in favour of Choudhury and split Pratapgarhs lands, awarding a half each to him and Radharam. The latter was angered by the decision and it has been suggested that his enmity with the British began at this point.

Despite this loss, Radharam's power increased. Among his most important customers were Kuki chieftains, with whom he maintained good relations, as well as giving employment to tribe members. This allowed him to expand his control and influence over the Kuki villages, which he used to raise a personal armed militia commanded by his son, Ranamangal. He also gained influence over the Maharaja of Tripura, Durga Manikya, who granted him the right to govern Chargola as its zamindar. Radharam created his own fort, courts and prison, effectively ruling as an independent chief, with the inhabitants of his lands referring to him as Nawab.

== Rebellion ==
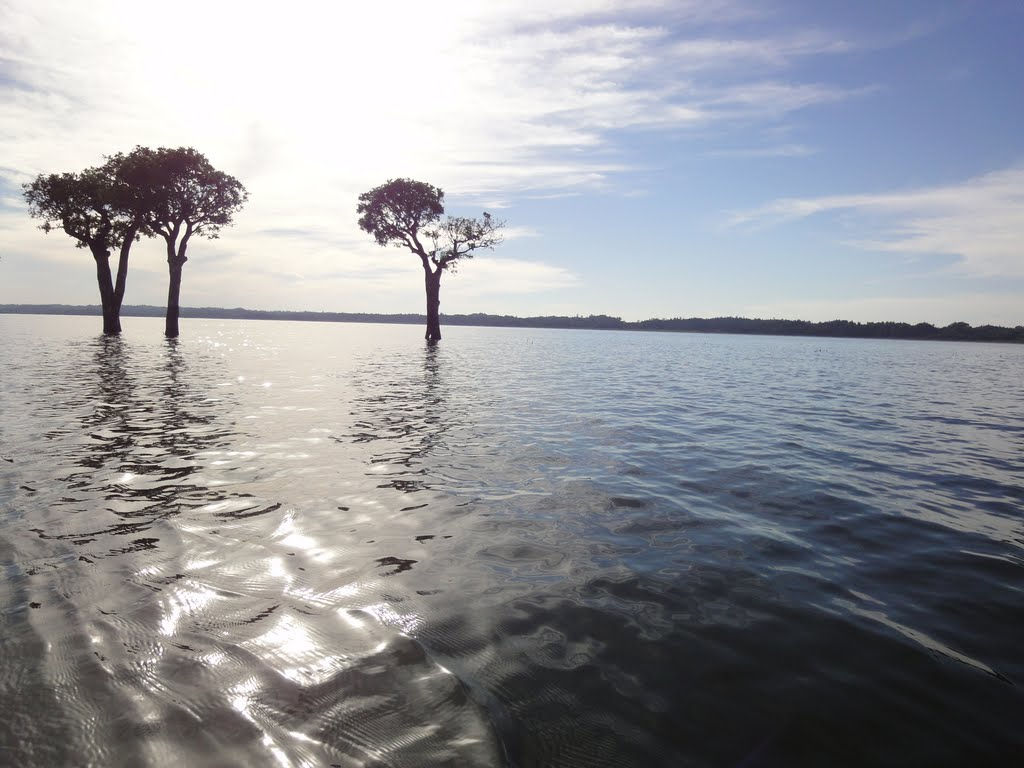
The war-boat was stationed in Assam's largest wetland, Son Beel.

Since 1765, when the East India Company gained the Diwani of Bengal from the Mughal Emperor Shah Alam II, all landowners were required to register themselves as Zamindars, initially under one, then five, followed by ten-year settlements, before finally Permanent Settlement was enacted under Lord Cornwallis. Radharam refused to submit to Company authority and proclaimed himself the independent Nawab of Chargola. Upon hearing that Ghulam Raja Choudhury had registered his own lands, Radharam was angered and decided to punish Choudhury. He began to use his militia to take control of parts of Pratapgarh, with the eventual goal of dislodging Choudhury from his lands. Choudhury himself was attacked at his family home by the Kuki soldiers. Though he survived, there were numerous casualties. When he and other local Zamindars facing similar attacks complained, the District Collector of Sylhet, Robert Lindsay, created a police outpost on the borders of Chargola to keep Radharam in check.

Within a few months of its establishment in 1786, the outpost was attacked and its inhabitants killed on Radharam's orders, who then had a fort manned by his Kuki soldiers erected in its place. The British then stationed a war-boat in the nearby Son Beel lake, though this too was attacked, with all the sepoys on board being killed. After a second failed expedition, Lindsay had a fleet of war-boats attack Chargola in a battle on the Son Beel that lasted several days. At the same time, the Company sent an army of foot soldiers to attack from another direction, with Radharam's commander, his son Ranamangal, being killed in the ensuing conflict and his soldiers fleeing. Chargola was occupied and his three other sons were captured, though Radharam himself escaped.

== Aftermath and legacy ==
Though he evaded capture for several months, Radharam was eventually arrested while in disguise attending a religious festival. He was put in a cage and according to official reports, committed suicide on his way to prison, although there are some suggestions that he was killed in police custody in Sylhet. While initially Chargola was given to Ghulam Raja Choudhury, it was returned to Radharam's sons after they swore their loyalty to the Company. It was divided into three parts between them, though only the eldest, Jaymangmal, was recognised as the Zamindar, with the estate being permanently settled under the Bengal Presidency.

Radharam subsequently became a legendary figure in the Barak Valley, with his revolt being seen as a heroic defence against British expansionism. As a result, he entered local lore as a populist freedom-fighter. Narrations of his exploits and of the rebellion as a whole continue to be preserved among rural communities in the form of folktales and ballads to the present-day.

== See also ==
- Pratapgarh Kingdom
