= Ajay Bhattacharya (revolutionary) =

Bengali communist revolutionary and anti-colonial activist

- অজয় ভট্টাচার্য
- Born: 10 January 1914; Sylhet District, Assam Province, British India (present‑day Lauta, Beanibazar Upazila, Bangladesh)
- Died: 13 October 1999 (aged 85); Dhaka Medical College Hospital, Dhaka, Bangladesh
- Citizenship: British subject (1914–1947); Pakistan (1947–1971); Bangladesh (since 1971)
- Education: Karimganj Public High School; Gurucharan College
- Occupations: Communist revolutionary Historian; Writer
- Known for: Leader of the Nankar Rebellion
- Political party: Communist Party of Bangladesh (Marxist–Leninist)
- Other political affiliations: Communist Party of India; Communist Party of Bangladesh
- Movement: Nankar Rebellion and Indian independence movement
- Parents: Upendrakumar Bhattacharya (father); Kripamoyi Bhattacharya (mother)

Ajay Bhattacharya (Note: Also spelled as Ajoy Bhattacharya and Comrade Ajoy Bhattacharya.) (Bengali: অজয় ভট্টাচার্য; 10 January 1914 – 4 January 1999) was a revolutionary activist, communist political organiser, historian, and writer from Sylhet. He became a prominent figure in the region's peasant resistance movements through his leadership in the Nankar Rebellion (1945–48). His written account of the movement is widely regarded as the most significant work of his career. Bhattacharya spent many years in prison during both British and Pakistani rule, remaining active in underground politics and later playing a key role in the formation and ideological direction of the Communist Party of Bangladesh (Marxist–Leninist). Alongside his political work, he produced novels, short stories, and historical writings that focused on feudal oppression and popular struggle.

== Early life ==
Bhattacharya was born on 10 January 1914 in Sylhet District, Assam Province, British India (now Lauta, Beanibazar Upazila, Bangladesh). He was born into a feudal family to Upendrakumar Bhattacharya and Kripamoyi Bhattacharya.

His father was a leader of the Zamindar Association and the Sylhet District unit of the Indian National Congress, and the family held strong anti‑imperialist views during British rule. Because of his involvement in underground political activities, Bhattacharya used several aliases, including Dewanbhai, Kashem, and Anil. In his political writings and essays, he also adopted literary pseudonyms such as Jatrik and Sajjad Zaheer.

== Academic career ==
Bhattacharya received his primary education at Lauta Government Primary School and later attended Lauta M.E. School and Biyanibazar Hargobind School for his secondary studies. He passed the matriculation examination in 1937 from Karimganj Public High School. In 1939, he completed his Intermediate of Arts (IA) in the humanities from Gurucharan College in Silchar, Cachar District, Assam.

In 1941, he enrolled in the Bachelor of Arts programme at Murari Chand College in Sylhet. His involvement in student and peasant political movements intensified during this period, and he was ultimately unable to continue his formal studies.

== Struggle and politics ==
Bhattacharya joined an anti‑imperialist revolutionary organisation called Tarun Sangha (lit. Youth Association) during his adolescence and served as the editor of its Lauta branch. As a student, he participated in the Kulaura peasant movement and in various student movements. He came into contact with the communist movement in India during 1935–36. After a branch of the Communist Party of India was established in Sylhet in 1936, he served as the general secretary of the Surma Valley Committee of the All India Students' Federation, which operated under the party's political leadership, and as the joint general secretary of the Kisan Sabha in Cachar District.

In 1937, Bhattacharya became a member of the Communist Party of India. From 1940 onwards, he worked as a full‑time party activist, operating underground while carrying out revolutionary activities. In 1941, he was elected a member of the Sylhet District Committee of the Communist Party. In 1948, he was selected as a delegate to the second congress of the Communist Party of India, held in Kolkata. Bhattacharya played a leading role in the historic Nankar Rebellion in Sylhet. After the Second World War, the centre of the Nankar uprising was Lauta Bahadurpur. Until his arrest by the East Pakistan police in May 1948, he served as the secretary of the forty‑five‑member Nankar Movement Struggle Committee based in Lauta Bahadurpur.

He was imprisoned a total of seven times during the British and Pakistani periods. Under Pakistan, he spent twenty years in jail between 1947 and 1967. The Nurul Amin government of East Pakistan offered him release on the condition that he permanently leave the country and go to India, but he rejected the proposal. During the 1950s, while incarcerated, he and Abdul Haque opposed the revisionist line associated with Soviet leader Nikita Khrushchev. In the 1960s, following the international ideological dispute within the global communist movement centred on Khrushchev's policies, the Communist Party of East Pakistan underwent a split. At the party's fourth congress in 1967, the Communist Party of East Pakistan (Marxist–Leninist), or EPCP (M‑L), was formed, and Bhattacharya was elected to its central committee. In 1970, under the leadership of Abdul Haque, the EPCP (M‑L) adopted the political strategy formulated by Charu Majumdar concerning the elimination of class enemies. According to the party, the EPCP (M‑L) conducted a revolutionary struggle in 1971 based on class analysis within the historical context of the period.

After the political shift of 1975, Bhattacharya, along with Abdul Haque, engaged in an ideological struggle against what they identified as "class‑collaborationist", "liquidationist", "surrenderist", and counter‑revolutionary tendencies within the movement. He stepped down from central party responsibilities in 1983, though he continued to remain active in party affairs as a senior revolutionary leader.

However, as a party member and an experienced veteran revolutionary, he continued to contribute to the party until his death through his experience, knowledge, advice, opinions, and support. In the early 1990s, during the dissolution of the Soviet Union and the countries of Eastern Europe, he took a position in favour of socialism and communism. During this period, he abandoned the use of a pseudonym and began writing under his own name.

== Literary works ==
Although his writing career began during the British period through the Sylhet‑based weekly Naya Duniya, edited by Jyotirmoy Nandi, Sanghati, and the monthly Balaka, edited by Kaliprasanna Das, it was his long years of imprisonment that shaped the main body of his literary work. The encouragement and influence of fellow political prisoners such as Satyen Sen, Ranesh Das Gupta, Sardar Fazlul Karim, and Abdul Haque played a significant role in his development as a writer. His notable works include:

=== Novels ===
- E-Ghar O-Ghar (1968)
- Kulimem (1995)
- Arannyani (1983)
- Batashir Ma (1985)
- Rajnagar (1995)

=== Storybook ===
- Neer (1969)
- Shubol Majheer Ghat (1997)

=== History books ===
- Nankar's Rebellion (Part 1)
- Nankar's Rebellion (Part 2)
- Nankar's Rebellion (Part 3)
- Nankar's Rebellion (Undivided 1999)
- What were mass movements like in this country half a century ago? (1990)

A large number of his writings, including more than a hundred published and unpublished essays as well as manuscripts of stories, novels, and additional essays, remain uncollected and unreleased. His creative work prominently depicts feudal exploitation in colonial India and the struggles of people who resisted it. His two books on the Nankar movement are regarded as important historical documents of peasant activism in the region.

== Death ==
He died on 13 October 1999, at the age of 85, at Dhaka Medical College Hospital.
