= Hasina Momtaz =

British news presenter, media and communications expert

- হাসিনা মমতাজ
- Born: Beanibazar, Sylhet District, Sylhet Division, East Pakistan
- Education: BSc International Relations, Law and Sociology
- Alma mater: London School of Economics and Political Science
- Occupations: Press officer, broadcaster, news presenter, journalist
- Years active: 2003–present
- Title: Deputy Head of News and Media for LGA
- Children: 1

Hasina Momtaz (Bengali: হাসিনা মমতাজ) is a British news presenter, media and communications expert and former press officer for the Mayor of London between 2003 and 2011.

== Early life ==
Momtaz was born in Beanibazar, Sylhet, East Pakistan (now Bangladesh) and came to London, England at the age of six. Her father was businessman Haji Mohammed Amiruz Zaman, who died in 2004. She has five siblings.

Momtaz left college with three A-levels. She graduated with a BSc Hons in international relations, law and sociology from the London School of Economics and Political Science. In 2008, she completed a Diploma from the Chartered Institute of Public Relations (CIPR).

== Career ==
Momtaz worked in communications, media relations, and stakeholder engagement for ten years within national, regional, and local governments.

From April 2003, Momtaz advised London governance for over eight years in City Hall, providing strategic and operational media relations counsel to Mayor of London Ken Livingstone for five years, until Boris Johnson took over in 2008. She then continued at City Hall and advised Johnson and his administration until September 2011.

During her time at the Greater London Authority (GLA), Momtaz devised and executed wide-ranging and targeted media strategies, advised on interview bids for the Mayor, high-profile policing and crime issues, sensitive community engagement issues as well as briefing the Mayor himself and his top team. During her time at City Hall, she was a member of the team which advised on some of the biggest national and international breaking news stories such as the 7 July 2005 London bombings, the IPCC investigation into the shooting of Jean Charles de Menezes and the changeover of administration following the London Mayoral elections in 2008.

In September 2011, Momtaz left the Mayor's Press Office to take on a senior management role as Deputy Head of News and Media Relations for the Local Government Association (LGA). In June 2012, she started her current role as Communications Business Partner for Tube Lines, a wholly owned subsidiary of Transport for London.

In 2013, Momtaz started anchoring a weekly English news and current affairs programme Weekly News Highlights on Bangladeshi television channel NTV Europe (Sky 852), broadcasting breaking news stories from Bangladesh across the UK and Europe. In 2014, she launched her talk show Dinner Debates with Hasina Momtaz on Channel i Europe (Sky 844). She is also presenting Your Property Show with property expert Kamru Ali.

Momtaz is also a freelance media consultant and has advised organisations such as community groups, voluntary organisations and membership bodies on media relations and stakeholder engagement. She is a non-paid Executive Director of media for the British Bangladesh Chamber of Women Entrepreneurs (BBCWE), a membership body aiming to support businesses of all sizes run by British Bangladeshi women as well as create and nurture the female business leaders of the future.

In May 2015, Momtaz was appointed editor in chief of Asian Sunday newspaper and Asian Style magazine.

== Awards and nominations ==
In 2009, Momtaz was runner-up for the 'Media Professional of the Year' award in the Asian Women of Achievement Awards.

In October 2013, she was part of the three – strong award-winning team which won the Melcrum Award for crisis communications and employee engagement during the London 2012 Olympics.

== Personal life ==
Momtaz is one of the founding members of a charity which was set up as a response to the 2012 garment factory collapse in Savar, Dhaka, Bangladesh and has raised funds for the families of the victims and survivors of the tragedy.

== See also ==
- British Bangladeshi
- List of British Bangladeshis
