= Mahimal =

Bengali Muslim community of inland in Bangladesh

The Mahimal (Bengali: মাহিমল, romanized: Mahimal), also known as Maimal (Bengali: মাইমল, romanized: Maimol), are a Bengali Muslim community of inland fishermen predominantly indigenous to the Sylhet Division of Bangladesh and the Barak Valley in Assam, India.

== Origins ==
According to the traditions of the community, the word Mahimal comes from the Persian word māhi (ماهی) meaning fish and the Arabic word mallāḥ (ملاح) meaning boatman. The Mahimal are said to become Muslims through the efforts of the Sufi saint, Shah Jalal, and his disciples. They are found along the banks of the Sonai and Barak rivers, predominantly in Assam's Barak Valley districts though some can also be found in the Sylhet District. The community converse in the Sylheti language.

== Present circumstances ==
The Mahimal were a community of inland fishermen, but most are now settled agriculturists. They are mainly marginal farmers, growing paddy and vegetables. A small number of Mahimal have taken petty trade. The Mahimal live in multi-ethnic villages, referred to as paras. They are strictly endogamous and marry close kin. Historically, the community practised village exogamy, but this is no longer the case.

Traditionally, the Mahimals are localised on the banks and nearby areas of rivers and other natural water bodies owing to their customary occupation of fishing. So, roads and other means of modern communications lack in their villages. Even there are some village like Kalachori Par where water remains at least for 6-months.

On the socio-economic front also, they are lagging behind the other communities due to their illiteracy and backwardness in education. Due to all-round backwardness, they have been the easy prey in the clutches of the so-called high caste people.

The Maimal welfare society of Assam was established by a group of youngman led by Nazmul Hasan of kathakal, hailakandi, in January, 2000. This association immensely contributed towards returning of MLA to Assam assembly from this community. Among other major roles at the initiative of this association the Maimal development council has been formed by the government of Assam.

At present a primary school named MWSA National academy has been set up and being run by this association.

== History ==
Visualising an abundance of opportunities, two Sardars of the Mahimal community, Raghai and Basai, led the community to migrate to Panchakhanda (present-day Beanibazar). The migration was the aftermath of the developmental tasks undertaken by Kalidas Pal, the erstwhile Hindu zamindar of Panchakhanda. The Mahimals subsequently maintained a presence in Beanibazar into modern times.

In 1913, Mahimals helped in the development of Sylhet Government Alia Madrasah by raising funds following a request by the Education Minister of Assam, Syed Abdul Majid, to the Muslim Fisherman's Society (a society of wealthy Mahimal businessmen) in Kanishail. With the money handed by Mahimals, several acres of land suitable for the construction of madrasa houses, including the present government Alia Madrasa ground, located southeast of the Dargah, were purchased and the necessary construction work was also completed. Abdul Majid was questioned by some people on why he dared to approach the Mahimal community (which is generally seen as a neglected lower-class Muslim social group) for aid. He responded by saying that he did to show that this community can do big things and that they should not be neglected.

Female education was not very prevalent among the Muslims of Bengal and Assam in the past. A decade after the establishment of Sakhawat Memorial Govt. Girls' High School by Begum Rokeya, a Mahimal known as Sheikh Sikandar Ali (1891–1964) of Sheikhghat established the Muinunnisa Girls High School, named after his mother. Ali was never educated in his life though he self-taught himself and realised the value of education, and the need for the development of the uneducated Mahimal community. Initially a girls primary school, when the school was converted to a high school, the upper-class attempted to wipe away Ali and his mother's name but were unsuccessful due to protest. Ali was also the second largest benefactor of the Central Muslim Literary Society after Sareqaum Abu Zafar Abdullah. The designated monthly meeting spot for the Society was situated at Sikandar Ali's store, Anwara Woodworks, in Sheikhghat. Ali also published a weekly from 1940. Initially a mouthpiece for the Muslim Fishermans Society of Assam Province, the magazine gained popularity among non-Muslims and Calcuttans, and was later published under the Fishermans Society of Bengal and Assam. It continued to be published until 1947 due to financial issues. Following Ali's death, poet Aminur Rashid Chowdhury wrote a lengthy editorial tribute in the Weekly Jugabheri. Ali's name is also mentioned in the Sylheter Eksho Ekjon (101 People of Sylhet) book by Captain Fazlur Rahman, author of the famous Sylheter Mati o Manush (Sylhet's land and people) history book.

=== Post-partition ===
Following the Partition of India in 1947, the Mahimal communities of Bangladesh (formerly part of Pakistan) and India have developed mostly independently of each other.

==== Bangladesh ====
The Mahimal community later assisted in the establishment of more madrasas in the Sylhet region such as Muhammad Ali Raipuri's Lamargaon Madrasa in Zakiganj, Bairagir Bazar Madrasa in Panchgaon and the Jamia Rahmania Taidul Islam Madrasa in Fatehpur. The latter, which hosts a science laboratory, is one of the most advanced and successful Madrasas in Bangladesh in terms of recent test results. Marhum Haji Muhammad Khurshid Ali of Bhatali, and his son, Haji Nurul Islam, greatly contributed to the establishment of the Kazir Bazar Qawmi Madrasa in Sylhet town. Another major educationist of Mahimal extraction was Haji Abdus Sattar of Haydarpur who benefacted the Bandar Bazar Jame Mosque as well as almost all major madrasas in Sylhet. Moinuddin bin Haji Bashiruddin of Kolapara Bahr successfully established a private university in the city.

The Mahimal community within Bangladesh have developed in numerous fields since independence. Notable Mahimals in the education field include:

- Marhum Abdul Muqit, a long-serving headmaster of the Raja GC High School
- Akram Ali of Sheikhpara, educated in Sylhet High Madrasa, retired Vice Principal of Madan Mohan College
- Afaz Uddin, professor in Sunamganj

The community has also gave horizon to government secretaries such as Akmal Husayn bin Danai Haji Saheb of Dighli, Govindaganj and Zamir Uddin of Ita. High School Headmaster Ali Farid's son was former secretary of the Ministry of Home Affairs.

==== In India ====
During the early 1960s, in an attempt to emancipate this downtrodden community from the curse of socio-economic backwardness some great leaders of this community like Morhum Maulana Mumtaz Uddin, Hazrat Maulana Shahid Ahmed (popularly known as Boro Mesab or Jaan e isaare raipuri), Mr. Sarkum Ali (Master of Krishnapur, Hailakandi), Morhum Maulana Shamsul Islam, Morhum Foyez Uddin (Master Saheb of Tinghori-Bihara), Morhum Haji Sayeed Ali of Srikona (Cachar), and few others, formed an organisation called Nikhil Cachar Muslim Fishermen Federation, with an area of operation of the old Cachar district (now split into Cachar and Hailakandi). This organisation led the society to give a socio-political identity and was successful to obtain the Other Backward Classes status for the Mahimals. Since the leadership of this organisation rolled through the elderly leaders only, a few educated youths of this community, in the mid-1980s, moved to form a youth wing which was later recognised under this organisation. Large groups of Mahimals led by the likes of Najmul Hasan, Maharam Ali (Hailakandi), Fakhar Uddin Ahmed and Abdul Noor Ahmed (Cachar) travelled across the Barak Valley, organising meetings and initiating a wave of self-identity among Mahimal youths.

Mr. Anwarul Hoque was the one and only member of Assam Legislative Assembly. (para 2–4 added by Fakhar Uddin Ahmed).

The Mahimal have set up a statewide community association, the Maimal Federation, which deals with issues of community welfare. They are Sunni Muslims, and have customs similar to other Muslims of Assam in India.

On the other hand, some young energetic educated boy from Maimal community have made an organization in 2012 for the allround development of said community named "Maimal Association for Humanitarian Initiative" (MAHI). Its leaders are Professor Moulana Abdul Hamid, Mohammed Abdul Waris, Ohi Uddin Ahmed, Jubayer Ahmed and others.
