= Shahbazi =

Shahbazi (Persian: شهبازی) is an Iranian surname. A related surname is Shahbazian. The surname may refer to:

- Abdollah Shahbazi (born 1955), Iranian researcher
- Ali Shahbazi (born 1937), Iranian general
- Alireza Shapour Shahbazi, Iranian archaeologist
- Cameron Shahbazi, Canadian countertenor
- Mehdi Shahbazi, Iranian businessman
- Parviz Shahbazi, Iranian filmmaker
