= Sujaul =

Village in Bangladesh

Coordinates: 24.7083°N 92.2000°E

Sujaul সুজাউল Shujaul
- Village
- Interactive map of Sujaul
- Country: Bangladesh
- Division: Sylhet
- District: Moulvibazar
- Upazila: Barlekha
- Union Parishad: South Shahbazpur
- Ward: 2

Population
  - Total: 5,117

Sujaul (Bengali: সুজাউল, romanized: Shujaul, lit. 'of Shuja') is a village in Bangladesh, located in South Shahbazpur Union, Barlekha Upazila, Moulvibazar District. The Sujaul Senior Fazil Madrasha is a notable educational institution here.

The village has a population of 5,117 and consists mostly of Bengali Muslims. The village has a cemetery, the Sujaul Central Graveyard as well as a school called Sujaul Government Primary School. The Sujaul Club is one of the four sports clubs in the entire union. There are two mosques in the village, Sujaul Jame Masjid and Sujaul Dingal Jame Masjid, and one eidgah, Sujaul Shahi Central Eidgah.

== See also ==
- List of villages in Bangladesh
