= Gurucharan University =

State university in Silchar, Assam, India

Coordinates: 24.8316°N 92.7993°E

- Logo of GU
- Former name: Gurucharan College
- Type: Public
- Established: 15 July 1935; 91 years ago (as College); 2023; 3 years ago (as University)
- Chancellor: Governor of Assam
- Vice-Chancellor: Niranjan Roy
- Location: College Road, Ambicapatty, Silchar – 788004, Assam, Silchar, Assam, India
- Campus: 8 acres (3.2 ha); Urban
- Website: www.gurucharanuniversity.ac.in

Gurucharan University is a state university located in Silchar, Assam, India. Established in 2023 through the upgradation of Gurucharan College, which was founded on 15 July 1935, the university was created under the Gurucharan University Act, 2023 enacted by the Government of Assam.

The university offers higher secondary, undergraduate, postgraduate and doctoral programmes through its faculties and departments. It also hosts study centres of Indira Gandhi National Open University and Krishna Kanta Handiqui State Open University.

Niranjan Roy was appointed as the first Vice-Chancellor of the university in 2025.

== History ==
Gurucharan College was established on 15 July 1935 and was initially housed in the bungalow of Pramode Charan Dutta on the bank of the Barak River. Owing to riverbank erosion, the institution was subsequently shifted to the campus of Silchar Normal School before being relocated to its present site in Ambicapatty, Silchar.

The college was initially affiliated with the University of Calcutta. In 1949, it became affiliated with Gauhati University. Following the establishment of Assam University in Silchar, the college came under its affiliation in 1994.

In November 2022, the Government of Assam announced its decision to upgrade Gurucharan College into a state university. The Assam Legislative Assembly subsequently passed the Gurucharan University Act, 2023, establishing Gurucharan University as a teaching, research-oriented, affiliating and partially residential state university.

In 2025, the Gurucharan University (Amendment) Act, 2025 was enacted to facilitate the appointment of the university’s first Vice-Chancellor. Subsequently, Niranjan Roy was appointed as the first Vice-Chancellor of the university.

== Academics ==
Gurucharan University offers programmes at the higher secondary, undergraduate, postgraduate and doctoral levels in the arts, commerce and science disciplines. The university comprises a number of academic departments and faculties engaged in teaching, research and extension activities.

== Accreditation ==
Prior to its upgradation as a university, Gurucharan College was accredited by the National Assessment and Accreditation Council (NAAC) with an ‘A’ grade.

== Campus ==
Gurucharan University is located in the Ambicapatty area of Silchar, Assam. The campus occupies approximately 8 acres (3.2 ha).

== Administration ==
The Chancellor of Gurucharan University is the Governor of Assam. The university is headed by the Vice-Chancellor, who serves as its principal academic and executive officer. Niranjan Roy was appointed as the first Vice-Chancellor of the university in 2025.

== See also ==
- Assam University
