= Panch Para =

Panchpara পাঁচপাড়া
- Village
- Location within Bangladesh
- Coordinates: 24°45′30″N 92°14′29″E
- Country: Bangladesh
- Division: Sylhet
- District: Moulvibazar
- Upazila: Barlekha
- Union Parishad: South Shahbazpur
- Ward: 2

Population
  - Total: 2,399

Panchpara or Panch Para (Bengali: পাঁচপাড়া, romanized: Pānchpāṛā, lit. 'Five neighbourhoods') is a village located in Ward 2 of South Shahbazpur Union, in Barlekha Upazila, Moulvibazar District, Bangladesh.

The village has a population of 2,399 and consists mostly of Bengali Muslims of Sylheti descent. There are three mosques in the village and these are: West Panchpara Jame Masjid, East Panchpara Jame Masjid and Central Panchpara Jame Masjid.

== See also ==
- Divisions of Bangladesh
- Districts of Bangladesh
- List of villages in Bangladesh
- Upazilas of Bangladesh
