= Sujaul Senior Fazil Madrasha =

Madrasa in Moulvibazar, Bangladesh

- সুজাউল সিনিয়র ফাযিল মাদ্রাসা

Location
- Sujaul, Ward 2, South Shahbazpur, Barlekha; Bangladesh
- Coordinates: 24.72001°N 92.17735°E

Information
- Type: Madrasa
- Motto: رب زدنى علما (Lord, increase me in knowledge! - Ta-Ha:114)
- Religious affiliation: Islam
- Established: 1 January 1890
- School district: Moulvibazar District
- School code: 18804 (IN 129572)
- Principal: Muhammad Faizur Rahman
- Faculty: 30
- Grades: Fazil (Degree)
- Enrollment: 757
- Area: 1.42

Sujaul Senior Fazil Madrasha (Bengali: সুজাউল সিনিয়র ফাযিল মাদ্রাসা, Arabic: المدرسة شجاع الفاضلية) is a private madrasa in the village of Sujaul in Barlekha Upazila, which is located in Bangladesh's Moulvibazar District. It is currently led by Headmaster Muhammad Faizur Rahman with the assistant professor being Muhammad Muinuddin Siraji.

== Location and premises ==
The madrasa is in close proximity to Office Bazar. The madrasa has four buildings in total; one of which is 4 floors.

== History ==
It was established on 1 January 1890. Since 1922, the students of this madrasa have been getting scholarships at different levels. In 1930, it became the first madrasa to achieve Dakhil (secondary) status in the Mohammedan Education's Assam Board. It achieved Alim status in 1965 and Fazil (degree) status in 1967. Abdul Aziz, the vice principal, left the school in 2016.

== Facilities ==
It has an active alumni association known as the Ex-Student Council. Courses are offered in a range of subjects such as Qur'an, hadith, Arabic, Arabic grammar, sarf, fiqh, Islamic history, mathematics, agriculture, biology, chemistry, tafsir, communication and English.
