= Nidhanpur =

Village in Sylhet District, Bangladesh

Coordinates: 24.805°N 92.155°E

Nidhanpur is a village in Sylhet District, Bangladesh. This ancient village, earlier within Kamarupa Kingdom, is known for discovery of many Copper plate grants of Kamarupa kings such as Bhutivarman and Bhaskaravarman. Inscription of Bhaskaravarman gives detailed account of land grants given to Brahmins. Copper plates found mostly in Panchakhanda pargana where historians opined that actual granted lands are located.

== See also ==
- Nidhanpur copperplate inscription
- Varman Dynasty
