= Nankar Rebellion =

Peasant movement of 1949 in Sylhet

Nankar rebellion
Date	1937-1950
Location	Sylhet District, British India (1937-1947), Pakistan (1948-1950)

Belligerents
Communist Party and Peasants Association	Government of India (British India) (1937-1947): British Indian Police; Government of Pakistan (1948-1950): East Bengal Police; Various zamindari forces

Commanders and leaders
Comrade Ajay Bhattacharya	

Casualties and losses
6 dead, many injured	

The Nankar Rebellion (Bengali: নানকার বিদ্রোহ, romanized: Nānkār Bidrōh, Urdu: بغاوت نانکار, romanized: Baghāvat-e-Nānkār) was a peasant movement that took place on 18 August 1949 in the Sylhet District (now Sylhet Division) of East Pakistan. The rebellion opposed the Nankar system, a customary practice where zamindars provided land to peasants (referred to as nankars) in exchange for food and labor. The movement, which had its roots in the early 20th century, culminated in 1950 with the abolition of the zamindari system, marking the end of the Nankar practice.

== Etymology ==
Nankar is a Bengali term derived from the Persian word Naan, meaning "bread," and the Sanskrit word Kar, meaning "tax," "rent," or "service." The term referred to a system in which landlords provided land to peasants, known as Nankars, in exchange for food or labor. The land allocated under this arrangement was referred to as "Nankar land." Under this system, not only the peasants but also their families, including wives and children, were bound to the landlords, often resulting in exploitative and servile conditions.

== Affected communities ==
The Nankar system predominantly involved individuals from the lower castes of Hindu society, such as Kiraans, Namasudras, Malis (gardeners), Dhulis, Napits (barbers), and Patnis. These groups often became Nankars, working the land provided by landlords in exchange for food or labor, which placed them in exploitative and dependent positions.

== History ==
The Nankar custom was a labor exploitation system, much like the Medieval slavery system. The feudal tradition originated during the colonial period and was practiced mainly in the Sylheti thanas of Beanibazar, Barlekha and Golapganj. In the Sylhet region, the landowners were called mirashdars and the greater mirashdar were called zamindars. The nankars would be accommodated close to the zamindars or mirashdars residence and also had permission to use the house and agricultural land provided. However, they had to be engaged in the work of the landlord's entire house, even during late hours after midnight. The nankars would not earn wages for this work. When the call of the zamindar was not immediately accepted, untimely torture was prosecuted.

In the village of Bahadurpur in Lauta, Beanibazar, there lived a zamindar who practiced the Nankar custom. His regulations were known to be strict such as the different prohibitions in the road in front of his home which included wearing shoes and sandals, using umbrellas and riding horses. The word locally spread of the zamindar's oppression and consultations took place establishing the Communist Party and Peasants Association in 1937. Comrade Ajay Bhattacharya, a man who was arrested multiple times by the British for his activism, led the Nankar movement. Other members from Beanibazar also joined him such as Shishir Bhattacharya, Shailendra Bhattacharya and Lalitapal from Lauta, Jawad Ullah from Nandirpal and Abdus-Subhan from South Potti. Uniting other Nankars, they publicly rebelled against the zamindar. They stopped the zamindar from earning his revenue and stopped him from entering markets. This news spread to other zamindars who, out of fear, petitioned to the government of Pakistan against the rebellion. The government later took action to suppress the rebellion. Other organizers included Varun Roy and Hena Das.

According to Bhattacharya, 10% (300,000) of the population of Greater Sylhet were Nankars. From 1922 to 1949, with the help of the Communist Party and Peasants Association, a Nankar movement against the feudalistic exploitation system was developed and centered in Bahadurpur, Lauta in Beanibazar, and spread to other Nankar-populated areas such as Golapganj, Barlekha, Kulaura, Balaganj and Dharamapasha.

On the 17th of August 1949, there was an important festival day, Makar Sankranti, in reference to deity Surya (sun), for Bengali Hindus. During the first day of this religious festival, the Nankar Hindus in Saneshwar Uluri began preparing to worship Manasa late at night until they start to feel sleepy. During sunrise, an armed force attacks the village and the Hindus begin to flee, many towards the nearby village of Uluri. Members of the rebellion staying in Uluri were Aparna Pal, Shushama De, Ashita Pal and Surath Pal. Eventually a conflict occurs between the force and Uluri villagers along the banks of the Sunai River.

=== Nankar Day ===
On 18 August 1949, six Nankars were killed in an armed attack by the EPR, police and zamindars belonging to the Muslim League, who were armed with lathis. The victims were:

- Rajni Das (50) - killed 15 days prior by the zamindar's armed forces on the bank of the Sunai river;
- Brajanath Das (50);
- Kutumani Das (47);
- Prasanna Kumar Das (50);
- Pabitra Kumar Das (45) and
- Amulya Kumar Das (17) - Killed later in captivity

Being pregnant, during the persecution of police, Aparna Pal Chowdhury had a miscarriage on the spot. She became lame in the severe torture and imprisoned for 5 years in Sylhet, Rajshahi and Dhaka jail. Wounded and captured people included Hridoy Ranjan Das, Dinanath Das, Adwayta Charan Das, Sushama Dey, Asita Pal, and Prakash Chandra Das, Hiran Bala Das, Priyamoni Das, Pramod Chandra Das and Mana Chandra Das.

=== Abolishment ===
After the incident in Beanibazar, the movement became increasingly popular throughout the country. As a result of this sacrifice, the Pakistan government was forced to abolish the zamindari system and repeal the non-governmental rule to recognize the ownership of the land of peasants.

== See also ==
- Conquest of Sylhet
- Muharram Rebellion
- Revolt of Radharam
