= Son Beel =

Lake in Assam

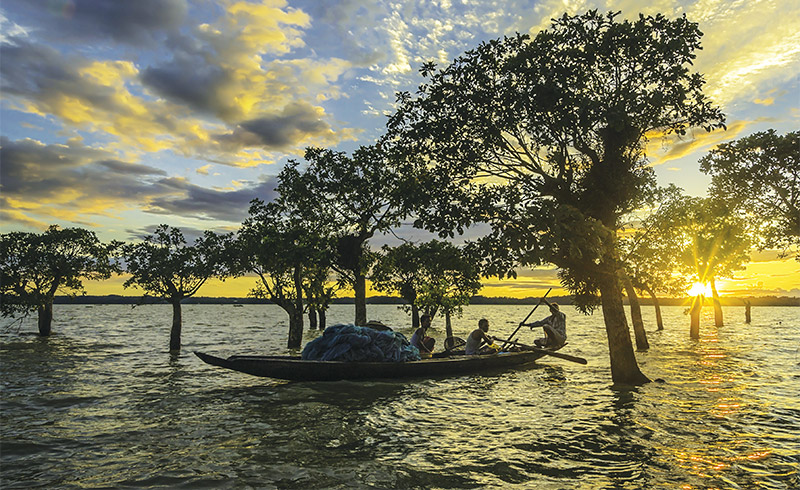
- Son Beel in Sribhumi district

- Location within Assam
- Location: Sribhumi, Assam - 788156
- Coordinates: 24.68742°N 92.443085°E
- Type: Freshwater
- Primary inflows: Singla as major River
- Basin countries: India
- Max. length: 18 km (11 mi) approx
- Max. width: 10 km (6.2 mi) approx
- Surface area: 4,388 ha (10,840 acres) in the dry season; 9,800 ha (24,000 acres) when filled
- Average depth: 1.5 m (4.9 ft)
- Max. depth: 4.5 m (15 ft)
- Islands: son beel
- Settlements: Sribhumi

Son Beel is one of the largest lakes in southern Assam in India. This freshwater lake is situated in the Sribhumi district, state of Assam.
