= Syed Murtaza Ali =

Bangladeshi writer and historian (1902–1981)

- সৈয়দ মুর্তাজা আলী

President of Bangla Academy
- In office 8 March 1975 – 7 March 1977
- Preceded by: Zainul Abedin
- Succeeded by: Syed Ali Ahsan
- In office 9 August 1969 – 8 August 1971
- Preceded by: Muhammad Qudrat-i-Khuda

Personal details
- Born: 1 July 1902 Karimganj, Assam Province, British India
- Died: 9 August 1981 (aged 79) Dhaka, Bangladesh
- Relatives: Syed Mujtaba Ali (brother); Syed Mohammad Ali (nephew); Syed Muazzem Ali (nephew); Shegufta Bakht Chaudhuri (nephew)
- Education: Murari Chand College; Presidency College, Calcutta
- Occupation: Civil servant

Syed Murtaza Ali (1 July 1902 – 9 August 1981) was a Bangladeshi writer. He was the elder brother of writer and linguist Syed Mujtaba Ali. He is noted for his works relating to the histories of Chittagong, Sylhet and Jaintia.

== Background and education ==
Syed Murtaza Ali Khandakar was born into a Bengali Muslim Syed family of Khandakars on 1 July 1902 in Karimganj, Sylhet District. His father, Khan Bahadur Syed Sikandar Ali, was a Sub-Registrar. He traced his paternal descent from Shah Syed Ahmed Mutawakkil, a Sufi Peer and a Syed of Taraf, though apparently unrelated to the region's ruling Syed dynasty. Ali's mother, Amatul Mannan Khatun, belonged to the Chowdhuries of Kala and Bahadurpur, an Islamised branch of the Pal family of Panchakhanda. His paternal family's ancestral home is Khandakar Bari in Uttarsur Village of Bahubal Upazila of Habiganj District.

Ali passed his matriculation examination from Sylhet Government School in 1921 and passed his ISc from Murari Chand College in 1923. He earned his bachelor's in physics from Presidency College, Calcutta.

== Career ==
In 1926, Ali became the magistrate of Maulvi Bazar subdivision. He was sub-divisional officer in 1940. Later he became the under secretary in the Education Department. He retired from civil service positions in 1959.

Ali served as the president of the Bangla Academy during 1969-1971 and 1975-1977 and Asiatic Society of Bangladesh in 1974.

== Works ==
- Pashchim Pakistan (1952)
- The History of Jaintia (1954)
- History of Chittagong (1964)
- Hazrat Shah Jalal O Sylheter Itihas (1965).
- Amader Kaler Katha (1968),
- Muztaba-Katha O Anyanya Prasanga (1976)
- Prabandha Bichitra (1967)

== Awards ==
- Bangla Academy Literary Award (1973)
- Independence Day Award (1982)
