= Beanibazar Upazila =

Beanibazar বিয়ানীবাজার
- Upazila
- Beanibazar Upazila
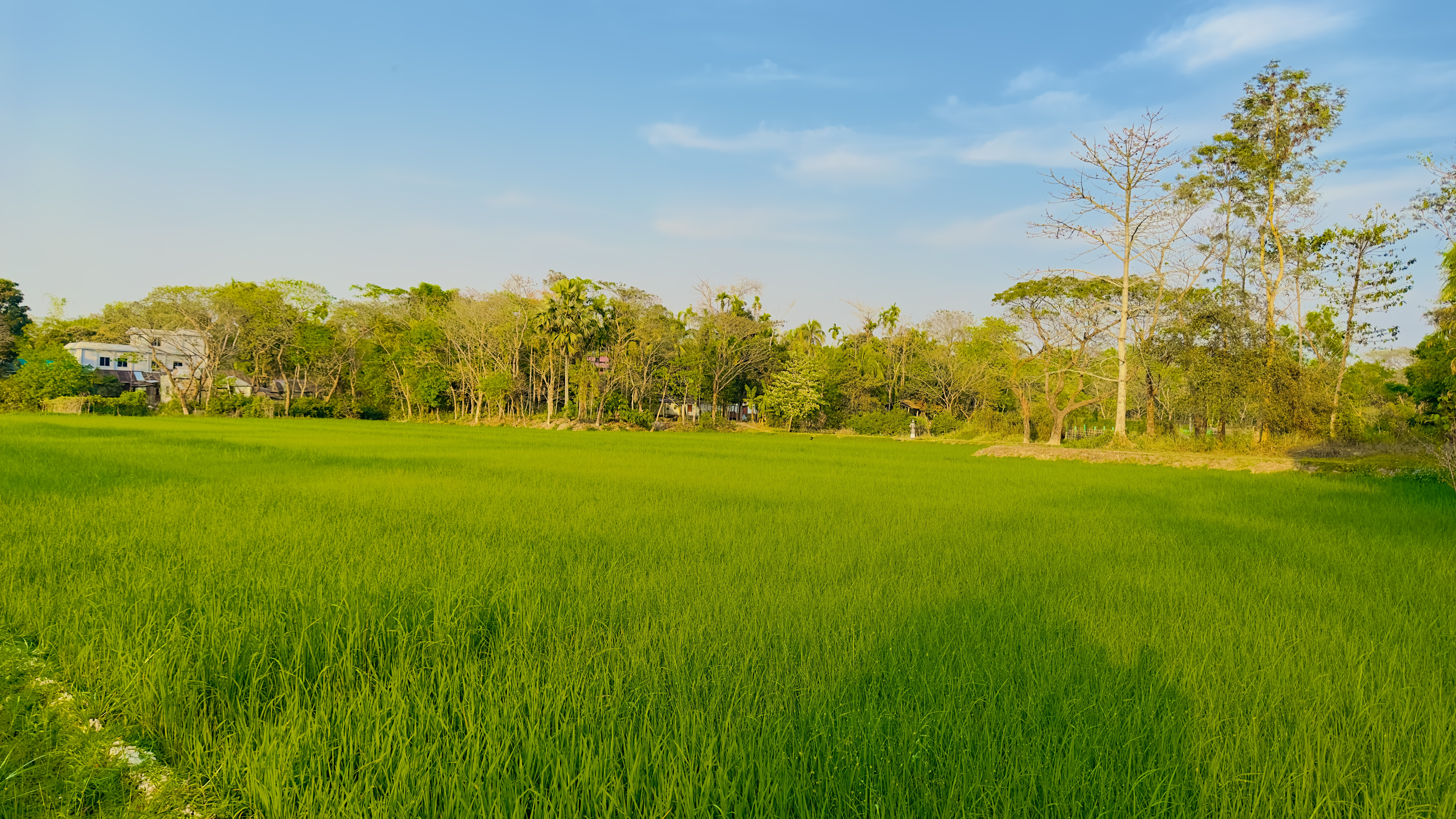
- Fields in Kholagram village in Mathiura Union

- Coordinates: 24.8250°N 92.1625°E
- Country: Bangladesh
- Division: Sylhet
- District: Sylhet
- Thana: 1938
- Upazila: 1983

Government
  - MP (Sylhet-6): Emran Ahmed Chowdhury
  - Upazila Nirbahi Officer (UNO): MD. Ashique Nur
  - Municipality mayor: Vacant
  - Upazila chairman: Vacant

Area
  - Total: 253.24 km^{2} (97.78 sq mi)

Population (2022)
  - Total: 260,603
  - Density: 1,029.1/km^{2} (2,665.3/sq mi)
- Demonym(s): Beanibazari, Sylheti
- Time zone: UTC+6 (BST)
- Postal code: 3170
- Area code: 08223
- Website: www.beanibazar.sylhet.gov.bd

Beanibazar (Bengali: বিয়ানীবাজার, romanized: Biyanībazar, lit. 'Morning Market') is an upazila (sub-district) of Sylhet District in northeastern Bangladesh, part of the Sylhet Division. The area is the successor of the territory of Panchakhanda, formerly ruled by the aristocratic Pal family.

== History ==
Beanibazar was part of the Kamarupa Kingdom in ancient times along with North Bengal and Mymensingh. The Nidhanpur copperplate inscription records a 7th-century land grant to 200 Brahmins near the Kushiyara River by King Bhaskaravarman.

The historic Panchakhanda pargana covered all of Beanibazar as well as surrounding areas. In the medieval period, the scarcely inhabited area of Panchakhanda was a feudal monarchy under Kalidas Pal and his descendants who assumed the title Raja. The ruins of the Pal royal palace and the large dighi (reservoir) that it sits beside were constructed by Kalidas's great-grandson, Varanasi Pal, in the 7th century BS (c. 1200s CE). They can still be seen in Beanibazar today. The Pals significantly developed and cultivated Panchakhanda allowing the migration of groups such as the Mahimals (who were led by their two Sardars Raghai and Basai) into the area. Mahimals subsequently maintained a presence in the region into modern times. Three generations after Varanasi Pal, during the reign of Ramjivan Pal, Panchakhanda came under the suzerainty of the Sultan of Bengal. Pratapchandra Pal of this family converted to Islam and founded the Muslim branch of the Pal dynasty in the Baghprachanda Khan mouza.

The name Beanibazar is derived from the existing Bihani Bazaar ("Morning Market") which was founded by the local landowner Krishna Kishore Pal Chowdhury. On 29 December 1912, a cultivator in Nidhanpur village discovered what he thought was a clue to the location of a hidden treasure, during the process of building his buffalo shed. He took the plates to a local landholder who brought them to the attention of authorities in Silchar, thus rediscovering the Nidhanpur copperplate inscriptions.

On 18 May 1940, one of the five thanas of the Karimganj Mahakuma, Jolodhup, was planned to also be split into two – Beanibazar and Barlekha. Beanibazar was given to the Sylhet Mahakuma while Barlekha went to South Sylhet Mahakuma. The upazila was the headquarters of the Nankar Rebellion. Beanibazar became an upazila in 1983. In the 1990s, coins of a Sultan of Bengal by the name of Nasiruddin Ibrahim Shah (r. 1415/16 – 1416/17) were discovered in Beanibazar. In 2009, the Beanibazar Sporting Club and Beanibazar Cancer & General Hospital were founded.

== Geography ==
Beanibazar is located at 24.8250°N 92.1625°E. It has a total area of 253.24 km^{2}. It is bordered by Golapganj Upazila to the west, Kanaighat Upazila to the north, Zakiganj Upazila and the Indian state of Assam to the east, and Barlekha Upazila to the south.

=== Sheola Sutarkandi International Border Crossing ===
Sheola-Sutarkandi International Border Crossing on Bangladesh–India border on Karimganj-Beanibazar route is in Karimganj district of the Indian state of Assam. Famous for having an International trade centre, Sutarkandi is an international border of India and Bangladesh. Through this space, export of fruits, silicon and coal is done. The place is situated in the district of Karimganj, Assam. It is located 14 km away from Karimganj and contains principal custom check post for the trade flow. Two national highway runs through Sutarkandi that is National Highway 151 (old) and National Highway 7 (new) which is 45 km from the border of Sylhet town of Bangladesh.

== Demographics ==
Historical population
Year	Pop. (000)	±%
1981	161	—
1991	182	+13.0%
2001	211	+15.9%
2011	254	+20.4%
2022	261	+2.8%
Source: Bangladesh Bureau of Statistics

Religions in Beanibazar Upazila (2022)
Religion	Percent
Islam	96.16%
Hinduism	3.82%
Other or not stated	0.02%

According to the 2022 Bangladeshi census, Beanibazar Upazila had 50,149 households and a population of 260,603. 8.65% of the population were under 5 years of age. Beanibazar had a literacy rate (age 7 and over) of 80.58%: 82.76% for males and 78.63% for females, and a sex ratio of 91.58 males for every 100 females. 51,733 (19.85%) lived in urban areas.

According to the 2011 Census of Bangladesh, Beanibazar Upazila had 42,119 households and a population of 253,616. 63,055 (24.86%) were under 10 years of age. Beanibazar had a literacy rate (age 7 and over) of 59.69%, compared to the national average of 51.8%, and a sex ratio of 1046 females per 1000 males. 42,030 (16.57%) lived in urban areas.

== Administration ==
Beanibazar Upazila is divided into Beanibazar Municipality and ten union parishads: Alinagar, Charkhai, Dubag, Kurarbazar, Lauta, Mathiura, Mullapur, Muria, Sheola, and Tilpara. The union parishads are subdivided into 132 mauzas and 174 villages.

Beanibazar Municipality is subdivided into 9 wards and 37 mahallas.

- Pourashava: Dashgram, Khasharipara, Sreedhora, Nobang, Kashba, Pondit Para, Supatala, Noyagram, Fothepur, Khasha
1. Alinagar: Raykhail, Rajapur, Chandgram, Nij Muhammadpur, Kadimolik, Konkalosh, Khasha, Kholagram, Uzandaki, Hatim Khani, Korgram, Dudair Paton, Chondor pur, Uttarbhag Nowagram, Beani bazar, Tikorpara, Uttar Bhag, Routh Bhag, Nosir Khani
2. Charkhai: Duttagram, Agiram, Bilua, Deulgram, Bagbari, Dahal, Gulaghat, Sachan, Shafachak, Torongo, Jalalnagar, Adinabad, Mondergram, Koskot Khan
3. Dubag: Kharavora, Gozukata, Goilapur, Charia, Mewa, Ejra, Panjipuri, Moyakhali, Dubag, Sylhetipara, Bangalhuda, Noya Dubag, Chokorbondo, Shutarkandi, Kunagam, Borogram
4. 5 No. Kurar Bazar: Aaqakhazana, Govindasree, Angura Muhammadpur, Deulgram, Angura Falokuna, North Aaqakhazana (Lamligram), Lawjary, Goror Band, Khashir Band, Khashir Naam Nagar, Khashir Band Haati Tila, Arij Khan Tila, Sharak Bhangni, Angarjur, Malarghaon
5. Lauta: Phariabohor, Kalibahar, Jaldhup, Baurbag, Kalaiura, Baraigram, Gultikar, Bahadurpur, Baghprachanda Khan, Tikarpara, Nandirpal, Gangpar, Gojarai, Astoshangon, Hijlor Tuk, Kanli
6. Mathiura: Dudbokshi, Raibashi, Shutarkandi, Sheklal, Poschim Par, Poroshpal, Uttar Par, Purbo Par, Doaka, Nalbohor, Kandigram, Kolagram, Arengabad, Minarai, Bej Gram.
7. Mullapur: Abdullapur, Pathon, Huknia Moholla, Nidhanpur, Lama Nidhanpur, Usphara, Barigram, Chandagram, Matikata, Kashatul, Lushaitola, Sopatola
8. Muria: Chhotadesh, Fengram, Bagon, Kunagram, Abhongi, Ashtogori, Borodesh, Barudha, Maijkapon, Chandagram, Noagaon, Ghungadia, Moirangon, Sharoper, Tajpur, Takaikuna, Noagram
9. Sheola: Balinga, Kakordia, Teradol, Shaleswar, Ghorua, Charaboi, Daudpur
10. Tilpara: Dasura, Sodorpur, Matizura, Holimpur, Gangukul, Kamarkhandi, Tuka Voraut, Shaneshor, Bibiray, Rojob, Debarai, Kangkul, Pirerchok, Dokkin Dsura

=== Upazila chairmen ===
List of chairmen
Name	Term	Notes
Muzzammil Ali	5/1985 – 5/1990	
Muzammil Ali	16 July 1990 – 11/1991	Second term
Abdul Khaliq Mayon	22 February 2009 – 29 January 2011	
Begum Ruma Chakrabarti	9 February 2011 – 14 May 2014	Temporary
Ataur Rahman Khan	14 May 2014 –	
Abul Qasim Pallav	present	

== News papers ==
- Beanibazar Times
- Beanibazar News24
- The weekly Beanibazar Barta

== Notable people ==
- Ajay Bhattacharya, Revolutionary, politician, literary, historian and leader of the Nankar Rebellion
- Athar Ali Bengali, 20th-century politician and Islamic scholar
- Govinda Chandra Dev, professor of philosophy
- Hasina Momtaz, former press officer for the mayor of London
- Khan Bahadur Dr. Maulvi Muraqib Ali Khan - British Indian Gazzeted Veterinary Surgeon in Sylhet

== See also ==
- Nidhanpur copperplate inscription
- Upazilas of Bangladesh
