= Achyut Charan Choudhury =

Bengali writer and historian

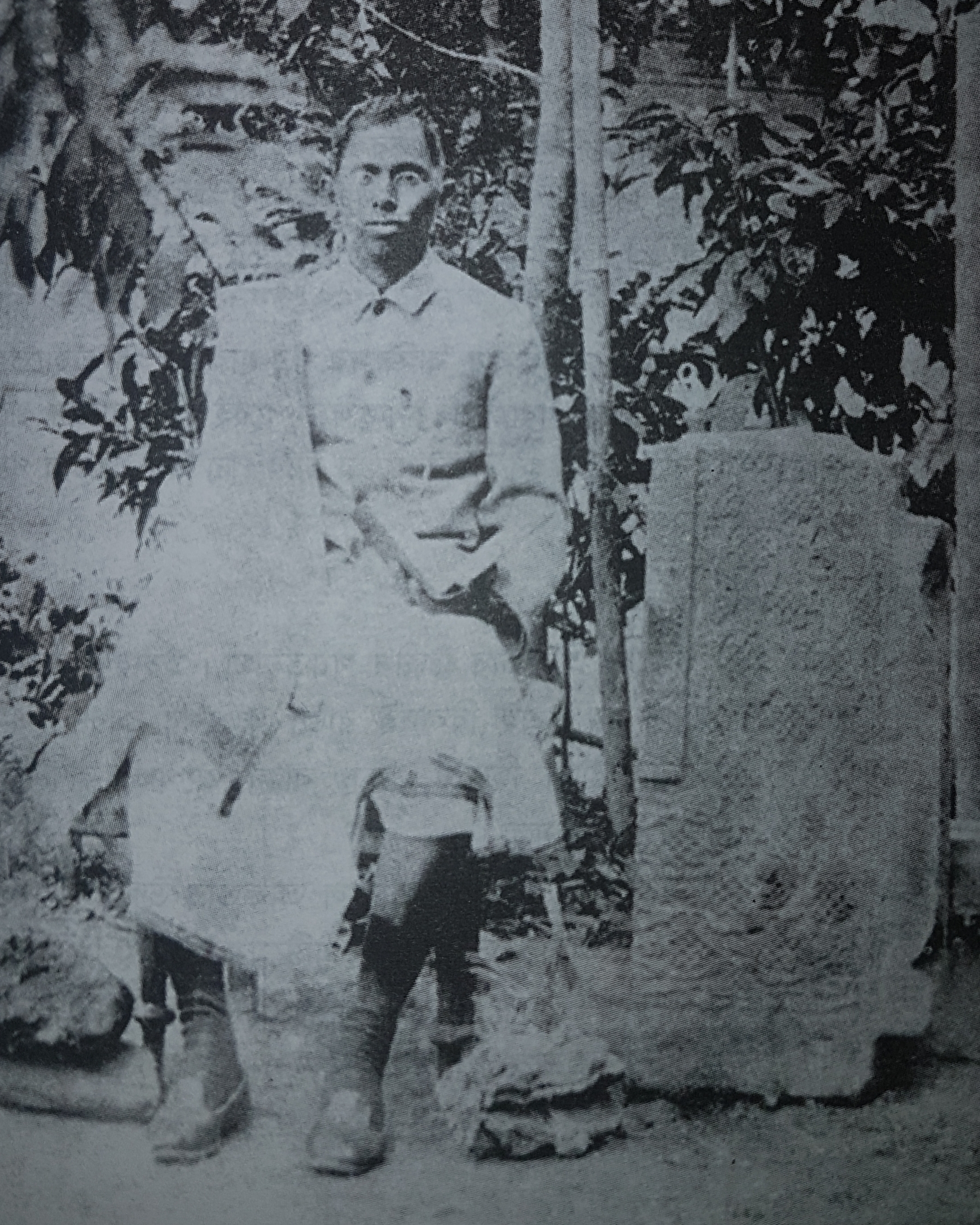
- Choudhury seated next a stone fragment from the Pratapgarh Kingdom, c. 1900s.
- Born: 5 February 1866
- Died: 25 September 1953 (aged 87)
- Writing career
- Language: Bengali
- Genres: History, religion
- Notable work: Srihatter Itibritta

Achyut Charan Choudhury (Bengali: অচ্যুৎচরণ চৌধুরী; 5 February 1866 – 25 September 1953) was a Bengali writer and historian. Though he wrote several books regarding Vaishnav Hinduism, Choudhury is most well known for his monumental work on the history of the Sylhet region, the Srihatter Itibritta.

== Life ==
Born in the village of Moina in Karimganj (then part of the District of Sylhet), he was the son of Aditya Charan Choudhury and his wife Kotimoni. Through his father, Choudhury was a descendant of the Zamindars of Jafargarh.

As a child, while he received some primary education, Choudhury also taught himself history and religion, with a special focus on literature and Vaishnav theory. The latter proved of particular importance in adulthood when he converted to the faith, performing pilgrimages to holy sites in places such as Puri, Vrindavan and Dhakadakkhin. In the last of these, he established a temple out of his own expenses.

In 1897, he began his career as a teacher in Girish Middle English School in Sylhet, before later being appointed treasurer of the landed estate in Patharkandi. In 1897, Choudhury establish a monthly newspaper called Srihatter Durpun, though this ceased publication after only two years.

A decade later, he began his magnum opus, an extensive work on the history of Sylhet, termed the Srihatter Itibritta. The text was published in two volumes. The first, released in 1910, focused its early chapters on the geography of Sylhet before chronicling the development of the region. This continued on in the second volume, published six years later, which also included the genealogies of prominent Sylheti families, as well as over a hundred short biographies of notable personages. The work was widely praised at the time of its release, with the contemporary historian Jadunath Sarkar applauding its "ideal technique" in chronicling regional history. The Srihatter Itibritta remains a lauded and popular work to the present-day.

Choudhury maintained an extensive personal library composed of three thousand books and manuscripts regarding history and religion. He also wrote a series of books on Vaishnav theology, with his devotion to the faith leading him to be regarded by local people as a guru. He died on 25 September 1953, aged eighty-seven.

== Bibliography ==
- Vokti Niryash (1893)
- Srigopal Bhatta Goswamir Jibancharit (1896)
- Prem Prosongo (1898)
- Srimot Haridas Thakurer Jibancharit (1900)
- Oviram Charit (1902)
- Srimat Shyamananda Charit (1902)
- Sripad Ishwarpuri (1903)
- 'rimat Roop Sanatan (1906)
- 'richoitannya Charit (1906)
- Srihatter Itibritta: Purbangsho (1910)
- Nitai Lila Lohori (1913)
- Sadhucharit (1913)
- Shantilata (1914)
- Srihatter Itibritta: Uttarrangsho (1916)
- 'ribalasutramer Padyoanubad (1922)
- 'rigouranger Purbavchal Paribhramon ba Assam O Dhakadakkhin Lila Prosongo (1928)
