= Moulvibazar District =

Moulvibazar District: মৌলভীবাজার জেলা
- District of Bangladesh
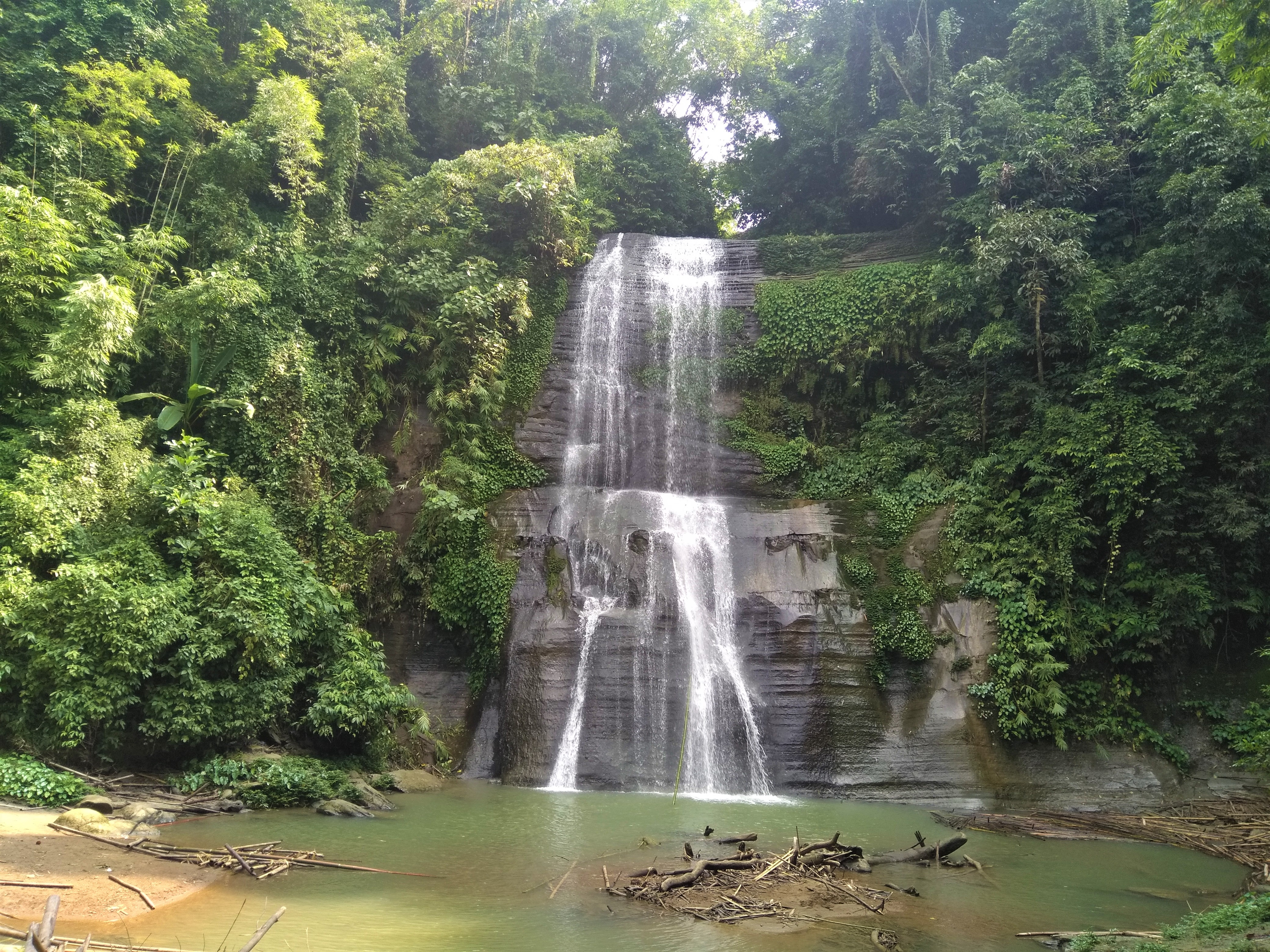
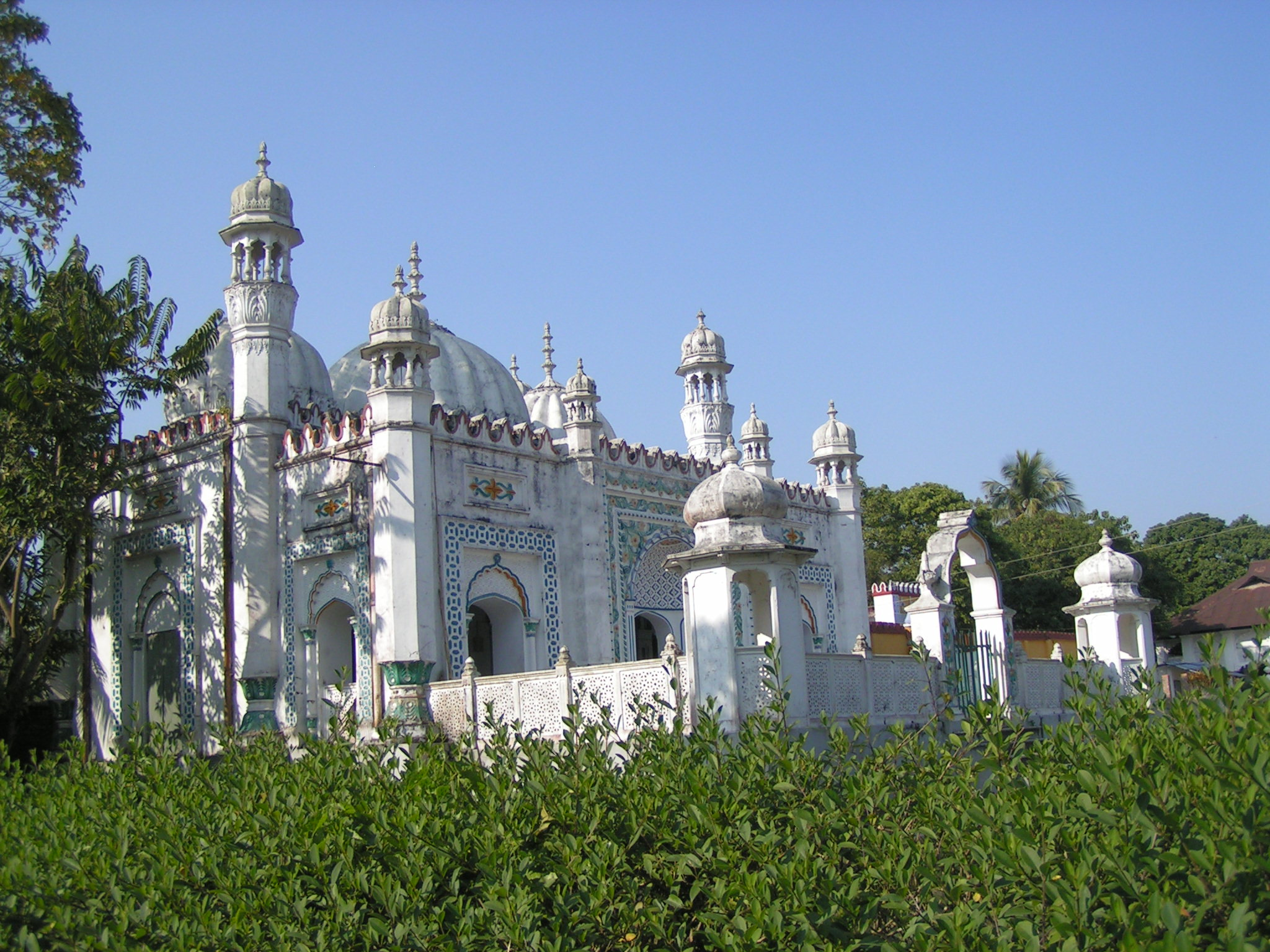
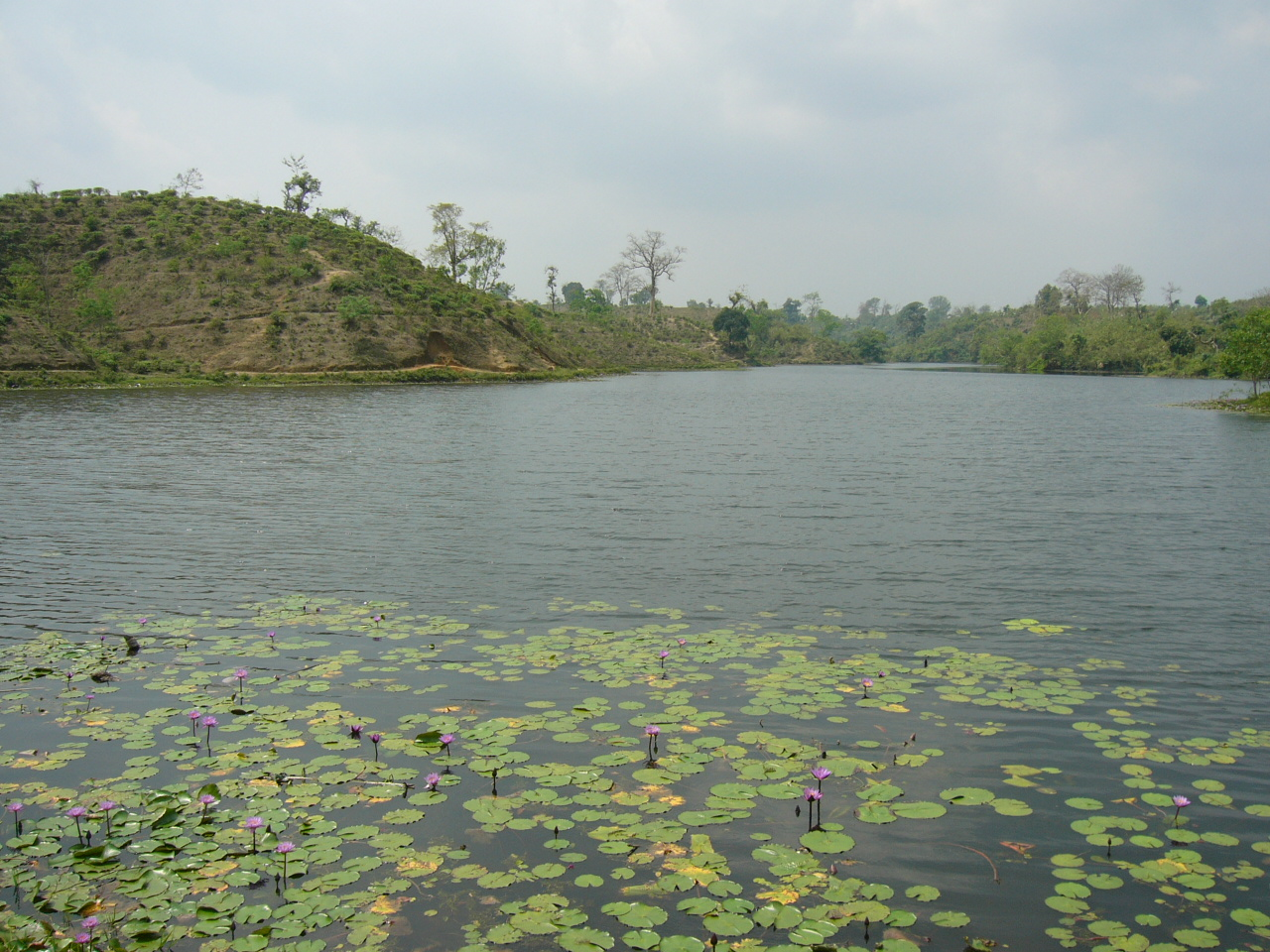
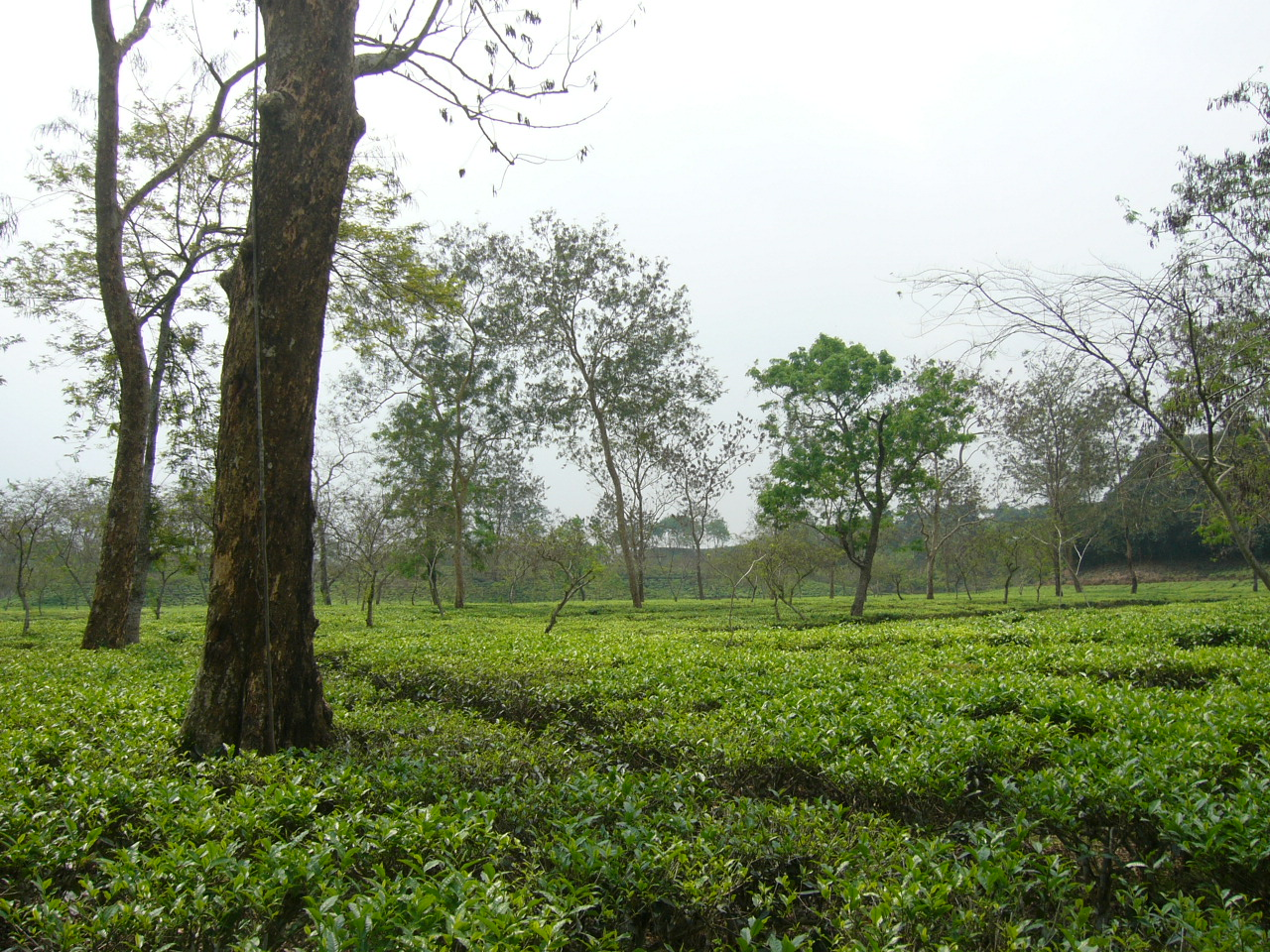
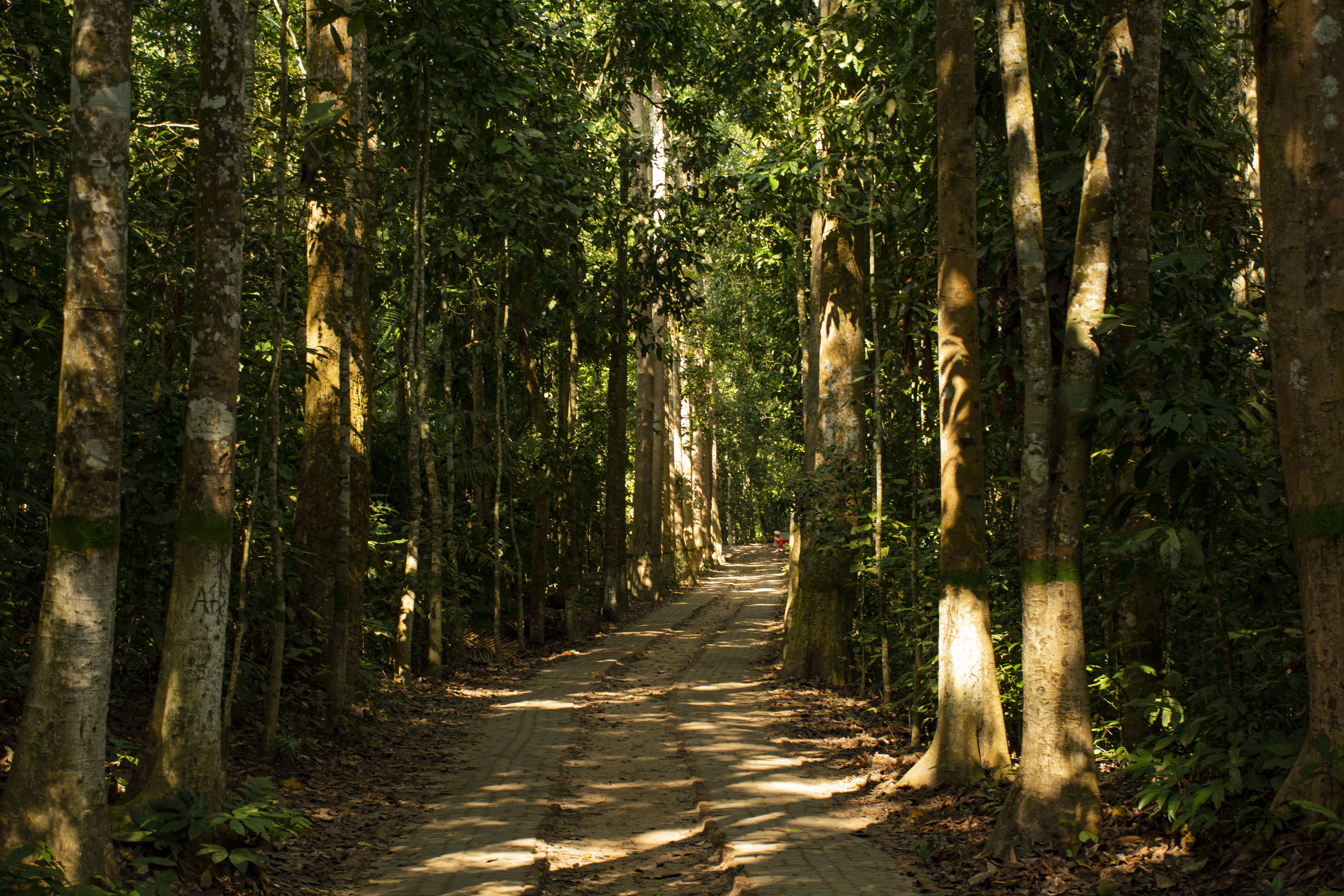
- Clockwise from top left: Hum Hum Falls, Prithimpassa Jame Masjid, Sreemangal Upazila Tea Gardens, Lawchara National Park, Madhobpur Lake

- Location of Moulvibazar District in Bangladesh
- Expandable map of Moulvibazar District
- Country: Bangladesh
- Division: Sylhet Division

Government
  - Deputy Commissioner: Touhiduzzaman Pavel

Area
  - Total: 2,799.38 km^{2} (1,080.85 sq mi)

Population (2022)
  - Total: 2,123,447
  - Density: 758.542/km^{2} (1,964.61/sq mi)
- Demonym: Moulvibazari
- Time zone: UTC+06:00 (BST)
- Postal code: 3200
- Area code: 0861
- ISO 3166 code: BD-38
- Website: moulvibazar.gov.bd

Moulvibazar District (Bengali: মৌলভীবাজার জেলা), formerly South Sylhet Subdivision is the southeastern district of Sylhet Division in northeastern Bangladesh, named after the town of Moulvibazar. It is bordered by the Indian states of Tripura and Assam to the south and east, respectively; by the Bangladeshi districts of Habiganj to the west and Sylhet to the north.

== Etymology ==
The district, Moulvibazar is named after the town which serves as its headquarter. The name is derived from the two words, Moulvi and bazar, meaning 'Market of the Moulvi'. 'Moulvi' is an Islamic honorific title and 'bazar' is the Bengali word for market or township. Moulvibazar is named after Moulvi Syed Qudratullah, a local judge and a descendant of Shah Mustafa, an Islamic preacher active during the advent of Islam in the region. It is believed that the name was coined in the 1771 when Syed Qudratullah established a small bazar on his zamindari land and local people named it as Moulvibazar. This market was established at riverside of the present Poschim Bazar (West Market), which gradually expanded over the time.

== History ==
Copper plates have been found from 930 AD in Paschimbagh, Tengubazar Mandir, Rajnagar and one of Raja Marundanath from the 11th century in Kalapur, Srimangal. The district was also part of the ancient Kamarupa kingdom. It is suggested that the area was inhabited by Buddhists and Hindus as evidence from inscriptions suggests there was an ancient university in Panchgaon, Rajnagar. The terrain was headquarters of the ancient Ita Kingdom founded by Raja Bhanu Narayan and its capital was in the villages of Bhumiura and Eolatoli. Other regions included Chandrapur or Chandrarajya which is modern-day Moulvibazar Sadar.

After the Conquest of Sylhet in 1303, many disciples of Shah Jalal scattered across the Sylhet region and the rest of Bengal. Shah Mustafa of Baghdad, a descendant of Abdul Qadir Gilani, migrated to Chandrapur ruled by Raja Chandra Singh where he lived on top of a small hill with his son Syed Ismail and would preach to the local people. Mustafa would eventually succeed Singh as the ruler of Chandrapur after marrying the Raja's daughter. Other Sufi disciples and saints who preached in Moulvibazar included Shah Kala, Haji Rasul, Shah Dorong, Helimuddin Nurnali, Hamid Faruqi, Syed Nasrullah, Syed Yasin, Syed Ismail, Nur Ali Shah, Shah Wali Muhammad, Sheikh Shihabuddin, Sabur Shah, Shah Helal and Shah Kamaluddin.

The final raja of the Ita Kingdom, Raja Subid Narayan lost a battle in 1610 in which the region became under the rule of Khwaja Usman, a fierce opponent of the Mughal Empire. He then established his new capital in Uhar, Kamalganj and managed to gain control of South Sylhet. However, this rule was short-lived after Mughal General Islam Khan I's attack in 1612. An important battle between the Mughal Empire and the Baro-Bhuyans was held in Pathan Ushar, Kamalganj. This led to the death of Afghan leader Khwaja Usman.

The Panchgaon Factory in Rajnagar Upazila produced cannons for the Mughal Empire. The famous Jahan Kosha Cannon, built by Janardan Karmakar remains in display in Dhaka.

After the Battle of Plassey in 1757, the British gave the region surrounding Moulvibazar high importance, especially in tea production. A rebellion against the permanent settlement of the British took place in Latu in 1857. On 1 April 1882, the area was declared a sub-division, or mahakuma, and named "South Srihatta" (and later "South Sylhet"), consisting of 26 parganas. A mass deforestation took place from 1898 to 1899, clearing the Longla-Singla Reserve in order to make space for settlements.

In 1912, there was an anti-British protest held in the village of Jagatshi in the Sadar Upazila. It was organised by Swami Dayananda having its seat at Dolgovinda Ashram. In 1921, the anti-British Khilafat Movement also spread to Moulvibazar and campaigners that were present included Chittaranjan Das, Hussain Ahmad Madani and Sarojini Naidu. On the same year, the non-cooperation movement also spread here after being established by Purnendu Kishore Sengupta in Vidia Ashram, Rangirkul, Kulaura. The peasant rebellion led by Panchanan Singh, Qasim Ali, Baikuntha Sharma and Themba Singh was also held in the 1900s in Vanubal, Kamalganj. In 1947, despite the Hindu majority in the region voting for joining India in the 1947 Sylhet referendum, the region was included in East Pakistan. In 1960, the South Sylhet sub-division was renamed as Moulvibazar by the mahakuma administrator Dr M A Sattar.

In 1950, the Shah of Iran, Mohammad Reza Pahlavi, visited Prithimpassa in Kulaura and stayed for four days at the palace and went wildlife hunting in the Estate forests alongside Khwaja Nazimuddin and Ayub Khan. He was hosted by Nawab Ali Haider Khan.

Armed resistance begun at the village of Srirainagar in Kanakpur on 27 March 1971. The Pakistan army was said to have made a surprise attack on the procession there in which two people were killed. On 20 December, a number of people were killed and wounded by mine explosions at the premises of the Moulvibazar Government High School.

On 22 February 1984, the President of Bangladesh, Hussain Muhammad Ershad, upgraded its sub-division status to a district as a part of his decentralisation programme. Shakir Uddin Ahmed was made the district's inaugural deputy commissioner whilst Mukhleshur Rahman was made the first district police super.

== Geography ==
Moulvibazar is in Sylhet, a district to the North-East of Bangladesh. It is 2,707 km^{2} in area, and has a population of 1.38 million. It is situated between 24.10 degree 24.35 degree north latitude and between 90.35 degree and 91.20-degree east longitude. It is surrounded by Sylhet District in the north, Habiganj District in the west and Indian states of Assam and Tripura in the east and south respectively.

The main rivers of the district are the Manu, the Dholoi and the Juri which flow from India. Every year during the rainy season, when there is excessive rainfall in India, the surplus water flows through these rivers and causes floods in low-lying parts of Moulvibazar (for example, the villages of Balikhandi and Shampashi on the northern side of the river Manu). Unless the rivers are properly dredged the floods can be devastating.

In the last few years, Moulvibazar has had a multi-million dollar flood defence system built, which is the only one like it in the whole country.

== Demographics ==
Historical population
Year	Pop.	±% p.a.
1974	991,768	—
1981	1,171,606	+2.41%
1991	1,376,566	+1.63%
2001	1,612,374	+1.59%
2011	1,919,062	+1.76%
2022	2,123,447	+0.92%

According to the 2022 Census of Bangladesh, Moulvibazar District had a population of 2,123,447 with an average 4.80 people per household. Approximately, 14.00% of the inhabitants lived in urban areas. The population density was 759 people per km^{2}. 19.21% of the population was under 10 years of age. Moulvibazar had a literacy rate (age 7 and over) of 75.85%, compared to the national average of 74.80%, and a sex ratio of 92.57 males per 100 females.

=== Religion ===
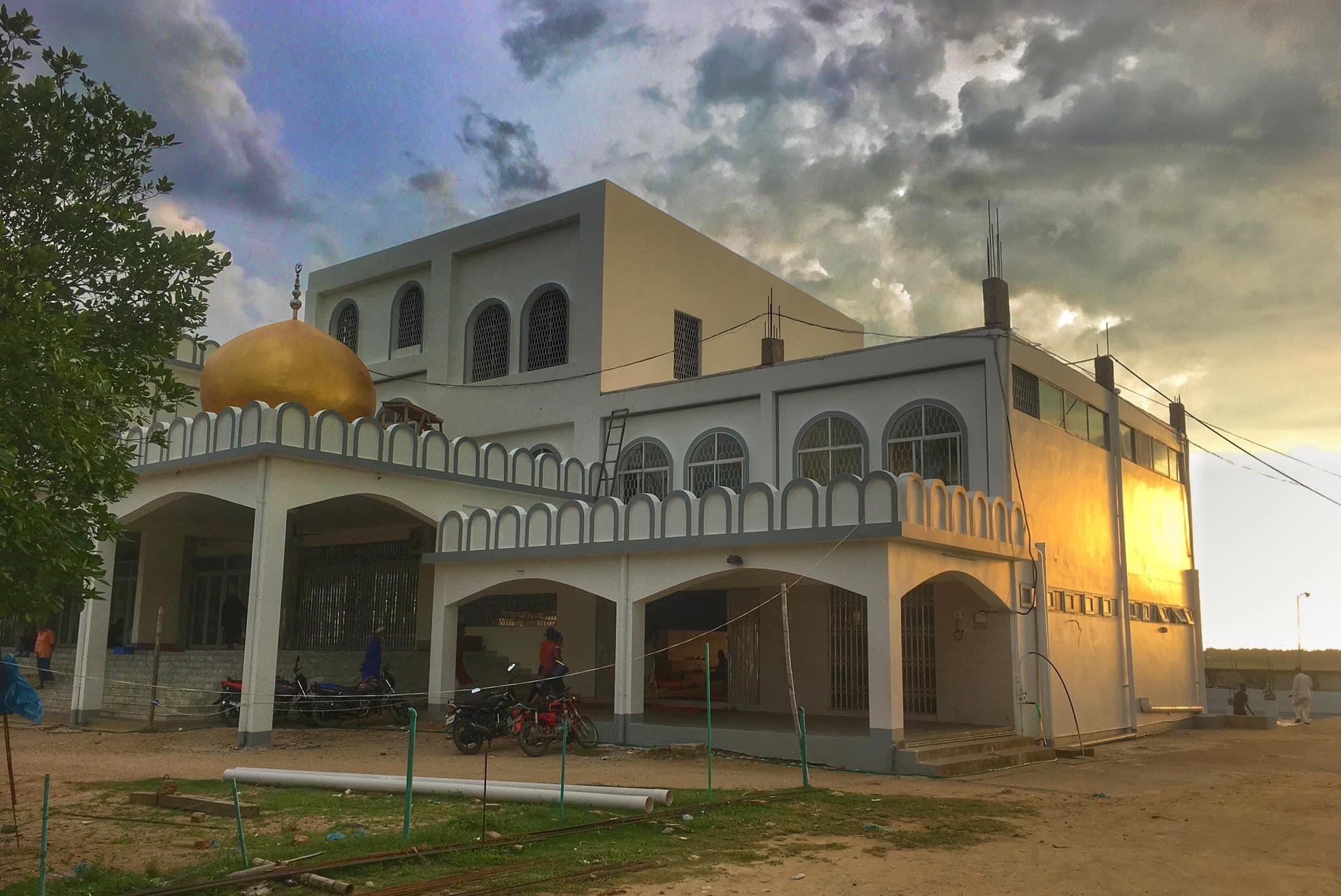

The district of Moulvibazar consists of 2967 mosques, 613 temples, 56 churches and 22 Buddhist temples. Sylhet division's largest Hindu temple "Kadipur Shib Bari" located at Kulaura upazila in Moulvibazar district. Notable mosques include the Mosque of Shah Mustafa, Goyghor Mosque, Jiladpur Mosque, and the Lawachara Jame Mosque. The revivalist Deobandi movement is popular in with Jamia Luthfia Anwarul Uloom Hamidnagar being a notable centre in Srimangal and many are part of the Tablighi Jamaat. Another Islamic institution is the Sujaul Senior Fazil Madrasha in Barlekha.

A small minority of Shia Muslims gather during Ashura every year at the Nawab Bari in Prithimpasha, which was home to a royal Shia family in Kulaura. There is a sizeable Hindu population in Moulvibazar many who are living in Sreemangal. Moulvibazar has the second-highest proportion of Hindu residents of any district in Bangladesh, after Gopalganj. Begum Talib-un-Nisa Khatun of Prithimpasha's Chhoto Saheb Bari established the famous Rabir Bazar Jame Masjid in the late 18th century.

Religions in Moulvibazar District (2022)
Religion	Percent
Islam	74.65%
Hinduism	24.45%
Christianity	0.84%
Other or not stated	0.06%

Religion in present-day Moulvibazar District
Religion	1941 (Note: 1941 figures are for South Sylhet subdivision and Barlekha upazila of erstwhile Sylhet district, which roughly corresponds to the present district.)		1981		1991		2001		2011		2022	
Religion	Pop.	%	Pop.	%	Pop.	%	Pop.	%	Pop.	%	Pop.	%
Islam	276,900	46.47%	802,401	68.49%	971,718	70.59%	1,170,054	72.57%	1,425,786	74.30%	1,585,235	74.65%
Hinduism	305,466	51.27%	355,091	30.31%	389,721	28.31%	426,851	26.47%	471,974	24.59%	519,263	24.45%
Tribal religion	12,685	2.13%	—N/a	—N/a	—N/a	—N/a	—N/a	—N/a	—N/a	—N/a	—N/a	—N/a
Christianity	433	0.07%	8,335	0.71%	12,651	0.92%	13,716	0.85%	15,350	0.80%	17,760	0.84%
Others (Note: Including Jainism, Buddhism, Zoroastrianism, Judaism, Ad-Dharmis, or not stated)	342	0.06%	5,779	0.49%	2,476	0.18%	1,753	0.11%	5,952	0.31%	1,189	0.06%
Total Population	595,826	100%	1,171,606	100%	1,376,566	100%	1,612,374	100%	1,919,062	100%	2,123,447	100%

Muslims make up 74.65% of the population, while Hindus are 24.45% and Christians 0.84% of the population. Moulvibazar was formerly a Hindu-majority region before Partition. During the Partition of 1947 many Hindus migrated to neighbouring districts of India. Later, a further wave of emigration of Hindus to India occurred during the 1971 Liberation War of Bangladesh. Ethnic population is 73,303 (3.45%), mainly tea tribes and indigenous groups like Tripuri and Khasi. 18,031 were Manipuri, 10,045 Khasi, 8,158 Munda, 6,308 Santal, 4,468 Oraon, 4,132 Garo and 3,318 Bhumij.

== Administration ==
Moulvibazar District upazila geocode map

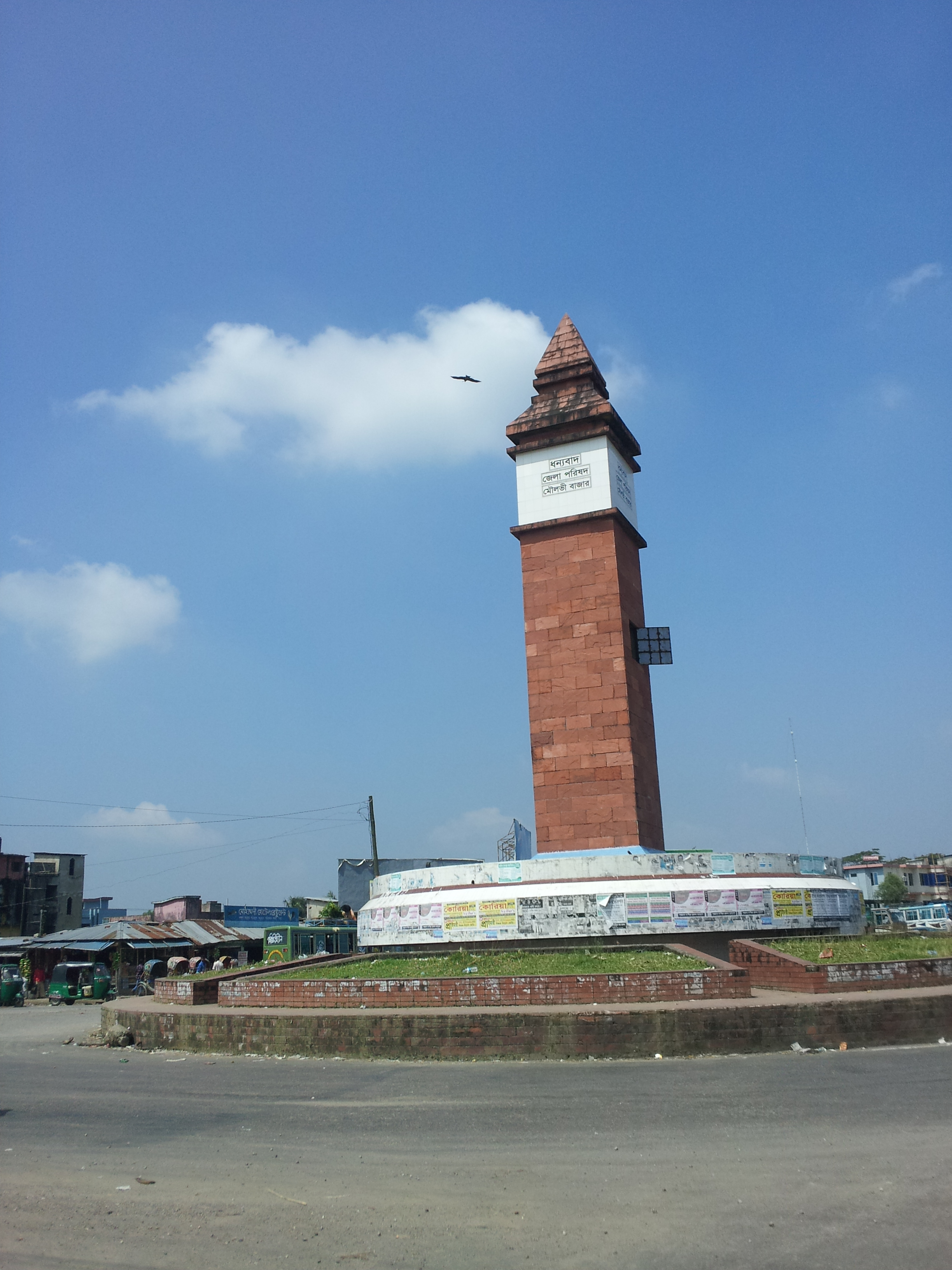
The Welcome Square of Moulvibazar District beside the Dhaka-Sylhet highway

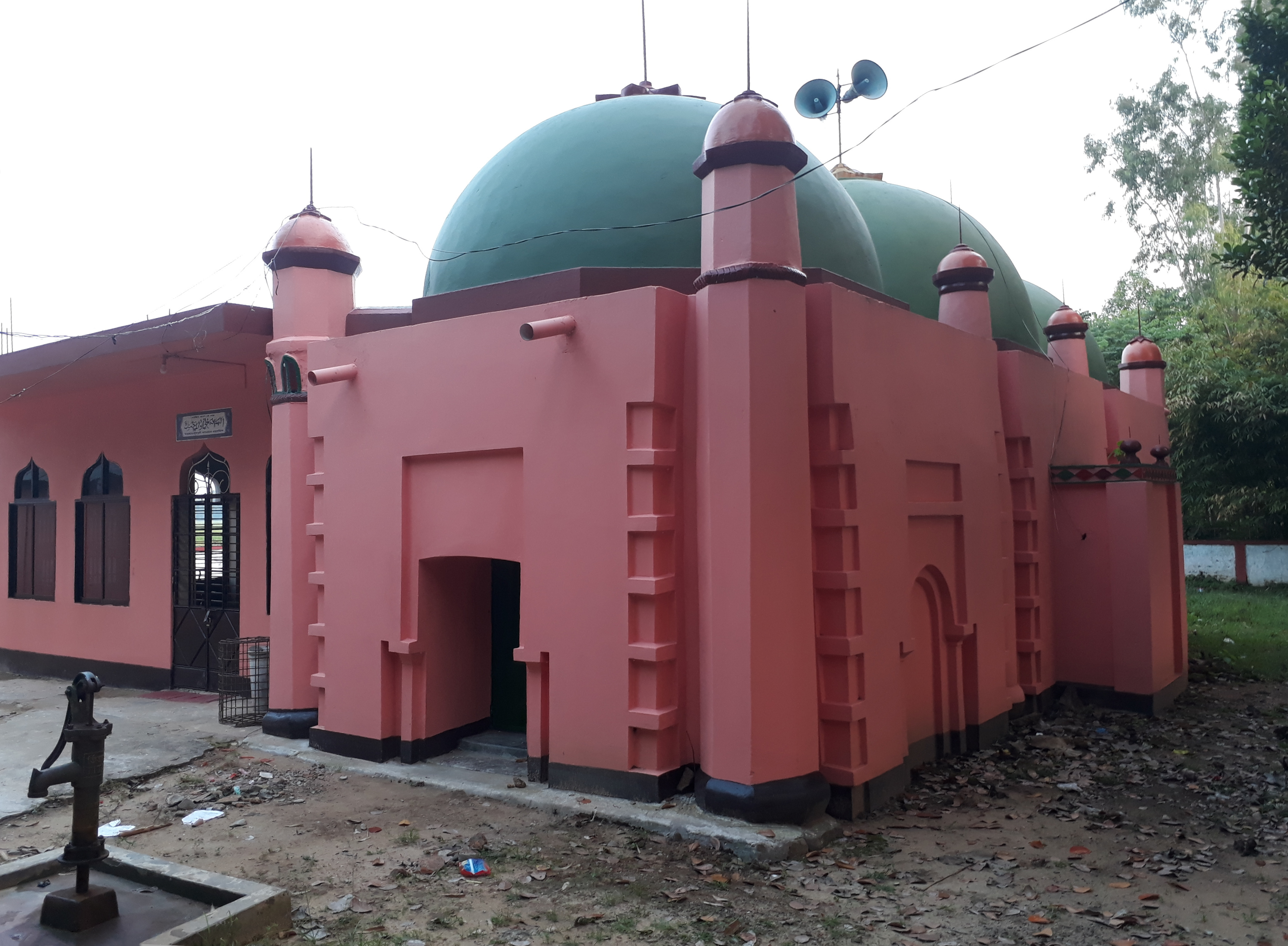
Jiladpur Mosque in Ashidron Union, Srimangal

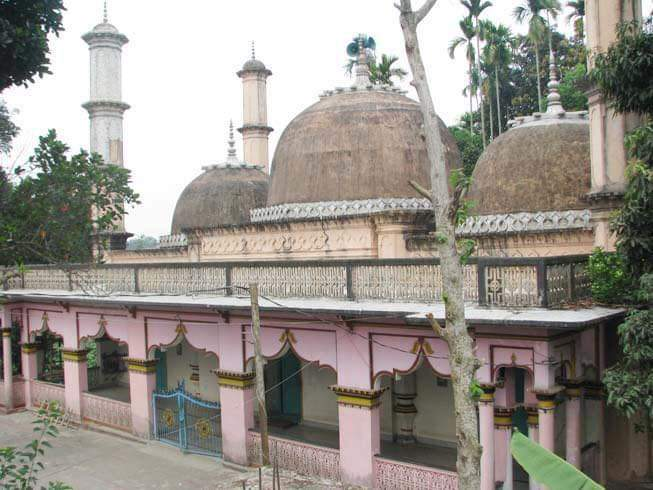
The Keramat Ali Jame Mosque was established by politician and businessman Md. Keramat Ali.

Moulvibazar is made up of 7 subdivisions or upazilas. They are:

1. Moulvibazar Sadar
2. Kamalganj
3. Kulaura
4. Rajnagar
5. Sreemangal
6. Barlekha (originally part of Joldhup in Karimganj)
7. Juri (formed in 2005 from unions of Kulaura and Barlekha)

There are 67 unions, 2,064 villages and 5 Pourashavas namely Kamalganj, Kulaura, Sreemongal, Barlekha and Moulvibazar. Almost 50,000 of the clan population belong to Manipuri, Khasia and Tripura clans. They tend to live in the areas of Kamalganj, Sreemongal and Kulaura Upazila of this district. There are 92 tea gardens in the district.

During the British colonial period, South Sylhet subdivision was divided into three tax collectory zilas, further divided into 28 parganas. The incomplete list of parganas of South Sylhet are as follows:

- Noyakhali Zila: Chowallish, Balishira, Satgaon, Chautali, Giasnagar, Chaitanyanagar, Athanagiri
- Rajnagar Zila: Ita, Shamshernagar, Alinagar, Indeshwar, Panishail/Panishali, Bhanugach, Adampur
- Hingazia Zila: Kanihati, Baramchal, Bhatera, Patharia, Yaqubnagar, Longla

Later on, South Sylhet subdivision was divided into five thanas:

- Moulvibazar Thana: Parganas - Shamshernagar, Chowallish, Shaistanagar, Howlisatrasati
- Kamalganj Thana: Parganas - Adampur, Bhanugach, Chhoychiri, Shamshernagar
- Kulaura Thana: Parganas - Kanihati, Patharia, Longla, Baramchal
- Rajnagar Thana: Parganas - Indeswar, Shamshernagar
- Sreemangal Thana: Parganas - Balishira, Chautali

== Economy ==
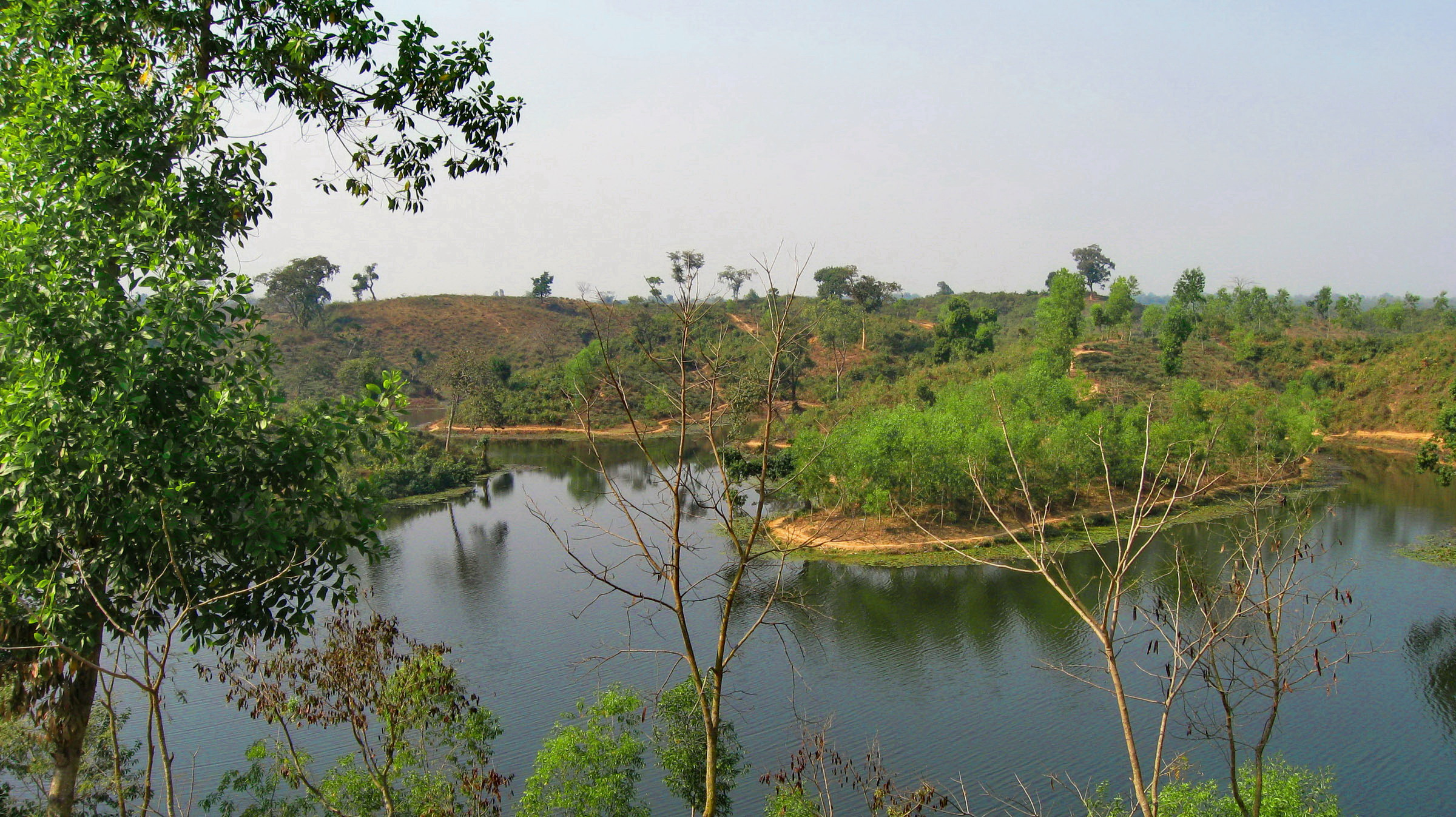
Madhabpur lake

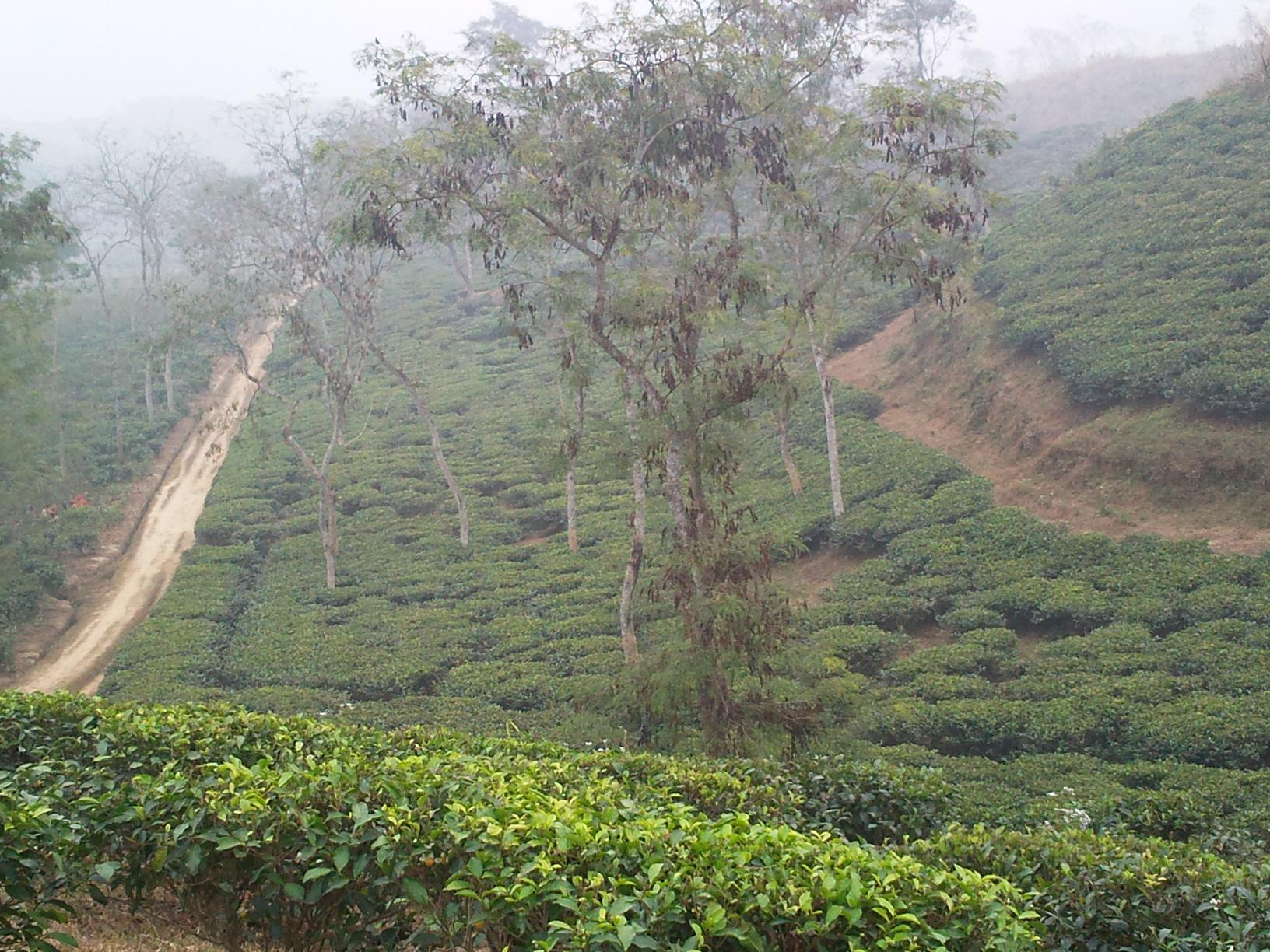
A tea estate in Sreemangal

The main exports of Moulvibazar are bamboo, tea, pineapple, cane, jackfruit, oranges, agar, rubber, mangoes and lemons. Ninety-one of Bangladesh's 153 tea gardens are located in Moulvibazar. The area is also home to the three largest tea gardens (size and production wise) in the world. Pineapples from the Sreemangal area are famous for their flavour and natural sweetness. Srimangal is known as the 'tea capital of Bangladesh' due to the high frequency of tea plantations found there.

== Transport ==
The main transport systems used in the city are Cycle rickshaws, auto rickshaws (mainly known as baby-taxis or CNGs), buses, mini-buses and cars. There are about 10,000 rickshaws running each day. Bus service prices have increased as of 2008, up to 30% higher, prices ranges from Tk4 to 25.95. The Kulaura Railway Station, Sreemangal Railway Station is the main railway station providing trains on national routes operated by the state-run Bangladesh Railway. Also Bhanugach Railway Station, Tilagaon, Vatera, Rashidpur Station is used by local peoples. There is a public-use airport in Shamshernagar.

== Tourism ==
The District contains the highest amount of tea plantations in the country. Srimangal is known as the Tea Capital of Bangladesh and is the only place where one can have the original 7-layered tea. Moulvibazar also has notable religious sites such as the dargah and mosque of Shah Mustafa, a companion of Shah Jalal; as well as the Jiladpur Mosque and Goyghor Mosque, two ancient mosques from the 15th century. Moulvibazar town has many shopping malls and several Indian, Chinese and American eateries. Madhabkunda waterfall in Barlekha is probably the most well-known tourist attraction of the district. The Hum Hum waterfall located in the Razkandi Reserve Forest in Kamalganj was also recently discovered in 2010. The district also contains one of the country's major national parks, Lawachara National Park, famous for its biodiversity. The park was also the filming site for the 1956 film Around the World in 80 Days. Madhobpur Lake is the only place in the country in which you can find the white-bellied heron. Hakaluki Haor, Hail Haor and Bilashchhara Lake are also other nearby wetland ecosystems. The memorial monument of Hamidur Rahman can be found in Kamalganj. There is also a multi-use stadium called Saifur Rahman Stadium.

== Education ==
The Bangladesh Tea Research Institute is located in Srimangal. It has made significant contributions in evolving and standardising the quality of tea, and introducing its research findings to the tea industry of Bangladesh. The oldest school of Moulvibazar district is Moulvibazar Government High School.

== Notable people ==
- Altaf Husain (1900 –1968) educationist, journalist.
- Syed Mujtaba Ali, writer, scholar and linguist (1904–1974)
- Md. Keramat Ali, MLA, 1954 and MNA, 1965
- Abdul Muntaquim Chaudhury MNA, MP
- Mohammad Ataul Karim is provost and executive vice chancellor at University of Massachusetts Dartmouth And Scientist.
- Tommy Miah, restaurateur and celebrity chef
- Shafiqur Rahman, physician and Amir of the Bangladesh Jamaat-e-Islami
- Saifur Rahman, longest serving Finance Minister of Bangladesh.
- Doly Begum, Canadian politician
- Naser Rahman, former MP for Moulvibazar-3 and chairman of the Saifur Rahman Foundation
- Surendra Kumar Sinha, Chief Justice of Bangladesh (2015–2017)
- Bajloor Rashid MBE, businessman and former president of the Bangladesh Caterers Association UK.
- Nadia Shah, politician, councillor and former Mayor of Camden. In May 2016, she became the first female British Bangladeshi mayor.
- Shanaj Ahmed, Cricketer for Sylhet Division
- Syed Mohammad Ali, founder of The Daily Star - the largest circulating daily English-language newspaper in Bangladesh.
- Syed Abdul Majid CIE, first native minister of Assam, pioneer of the agricultural industry
- Dwijen Sharma, Botanist, Environmentalist and science writer.
- Mahbubur Rahman Sufil, footballer and captain of Arambagh KS
- Syed Mohsin Ali, former Social Welfare Minister of Bangladesh
- Syeda Saira Mohsin, former MP for Moulvibazar-3
- Abdus Shahid, Former Minister of Agriculture.
- Md. Shahab Uddin, Former Minister of Environment, Forest and Climate Change.
- Nawab Ali Amjad Khan, 8th Nawab of Longla, Honorary Magistrate, Expert hunter, Philanthropist and Educationist
- Nawab Ali Abbas Khan, Jatiya Party politician and three-time MP for Moulvibazar-2
- Nawab Ali Haider Khan, 9th Nawab of Longla, government minister and leader of the Independent Muslim Party
- Abdul Matin, former MP for Moulvibazar-2
- Parvez Haris, biomedical science professor at De Montfort University
- Rangalal Sen, National Professor of Bangladesh
- Mohammad Zillur Rahman, MP for Moulvibazar-3
- Dewan Abdul Basith, lawyer and politician

== See also ==
- Districts of Bangladesh
