= Hum Hum Waterfall =

Hum Hum
- Cheetah Falls
- Location: Kamalganj Upazila, Moulvibazar District
- Coordinates: 24°10′04.7″N 91°54′45.1″E
- Type: Horsetail waterfall
- Total height: 135–160 feet (41–49 m)

Hum Hum (Bengali: হাম হাম ঝর্ণা, romanized: Ham Ham Jhorṇa) or Ham Ham, known by locals as Cheetah Falls (Bengali: চিতা ঝর্ণা, romanized: Chita Jhorṇa), is a waterfall in the Rajkandi reserve forest in Kamalganj Upazila of Moulvibazar District in Bangladesh.

The height of the waterfall has not been accurately determined, but sources approximate it to be 135–160 feet (41–49 m). No official efforts have been made to develop access to the waterfall. Typically, tourists rely on local guides to navigate their way to the fountain.

== History ==
=== Discovery ===
The discovery of Hum Hum waterfall is attributed to a group of tourists accompanied by tourist guide Shyamal Deva Barma, either in late 2010 or 2009, depending on varying sources.

=== Toponymy ===
The naming of the waterfall "Hum Hum" has sparked various interpretations. Some suggest it originates from "Hammam," signifying a bathhouse, while others attribute it to the Sylheti term "a-m a-m," denoting the sound of rushing water, akin to the waterfall's roar, leading urban tourists to call it "Hum Hum."

== Environment ==
The path to the waterfall is adorned with wild trees like Jarul, Chikrashi, and Kadam, attracting colorful butterflies. Spectacled monkeys can be seen moving among the branches of Dumur trees. The forest is lush with diverse vegetation, including natural bamboo forests with species like Dolu, Muli, Mitinga, and Kali. To reach the waterfall, visitors must navigate through dense jungle and cross several streams, as there is no government infrastructure in the vicinity.

The stream cascades down the mountainside, flowing over large rocks through countless species of creepers with a gurgling sound. Plummeting from a height of approximately 150 feet (46 m), the stream navigates through rocky terrain, carving its path amidst lush hills adorned with diverse vegetation.

== Transportation and navigation ==
Visitors can travel from Dhaka to Sreemangal Upazila in Sylhet by bus or train. Upon reaching Sreemangal, they can opt for an autorickshaw or a four-wheeler (locally known as jeep) to reach Kolabonpara (also known as Tellaingbari), which is the last village in Kamalganj Upazila near Champarai Tea Estate, located in Kurma forest beat. Beyond this point, human habitation dwindles, marking the start of the journey to Hum Hum waterfall. The journey involves crossing the steep Mokam Tila hill and navigating muddy paths and streams. Quicksand may occasionally form along these paths, with no tourist guidance available. Moreover, travelers must trek through dense jungle for hours, facing encounters with monkeys, snakes, mosquitoes, and leeches along the way.

== Gallery ==
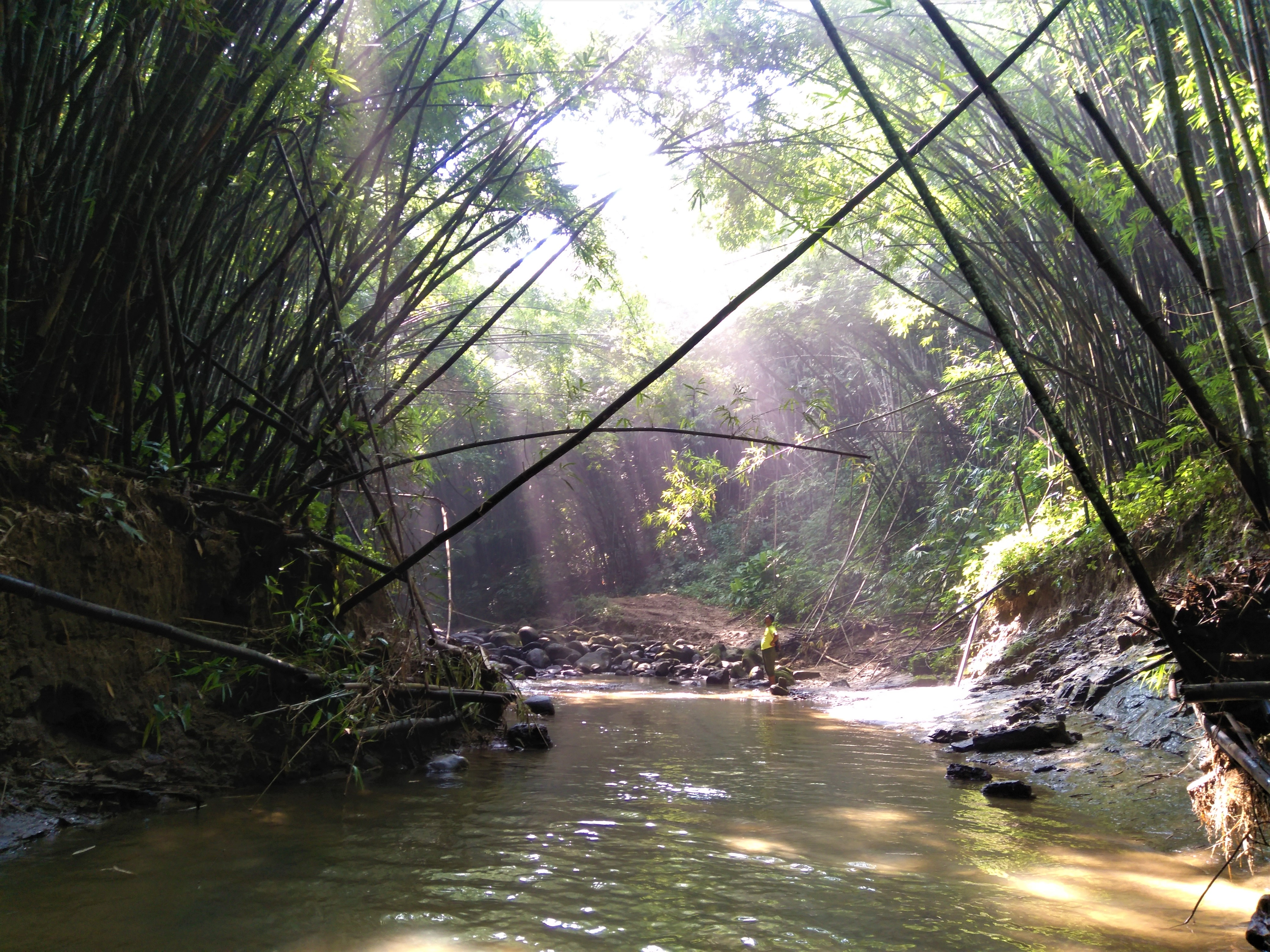

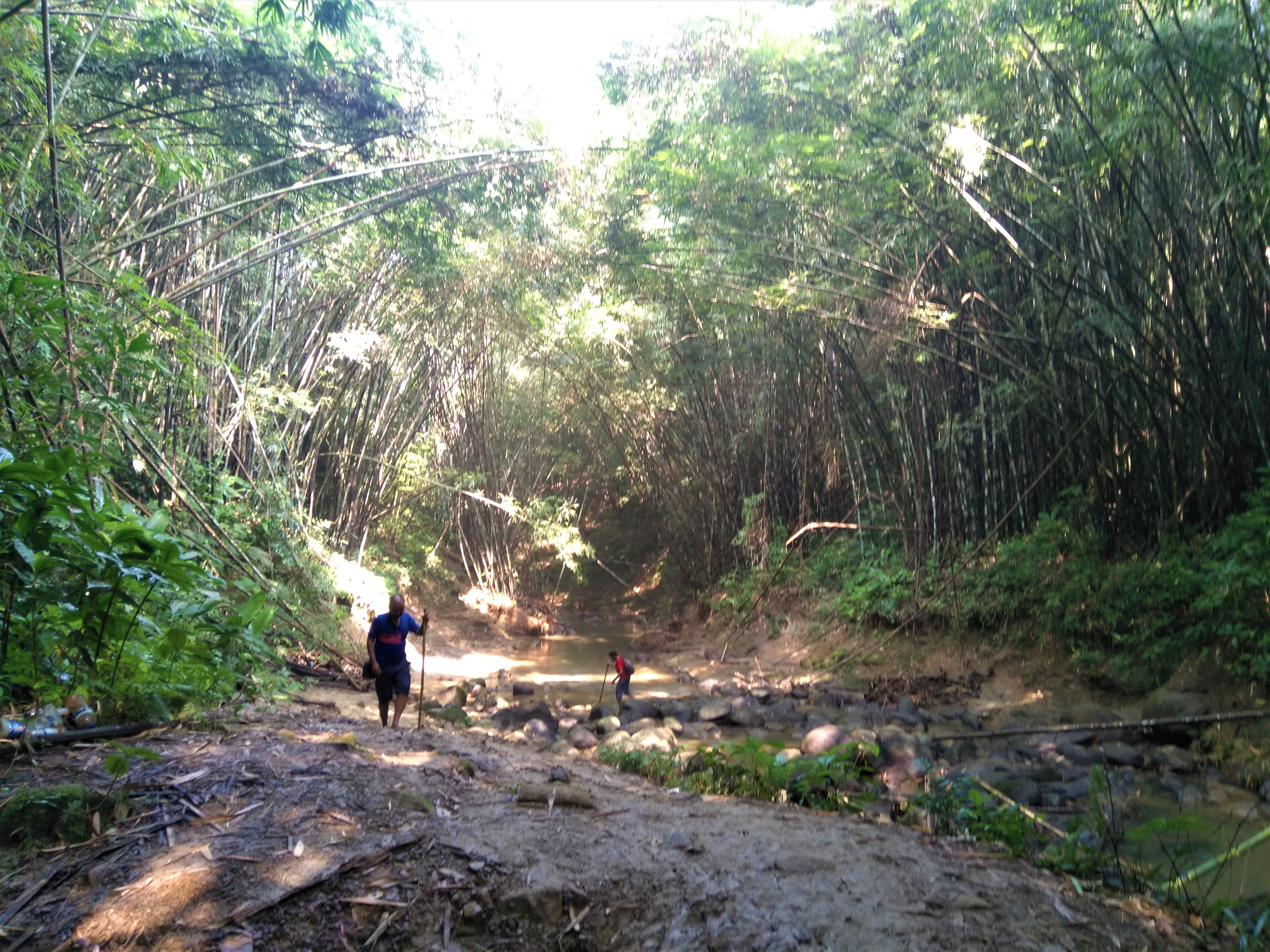

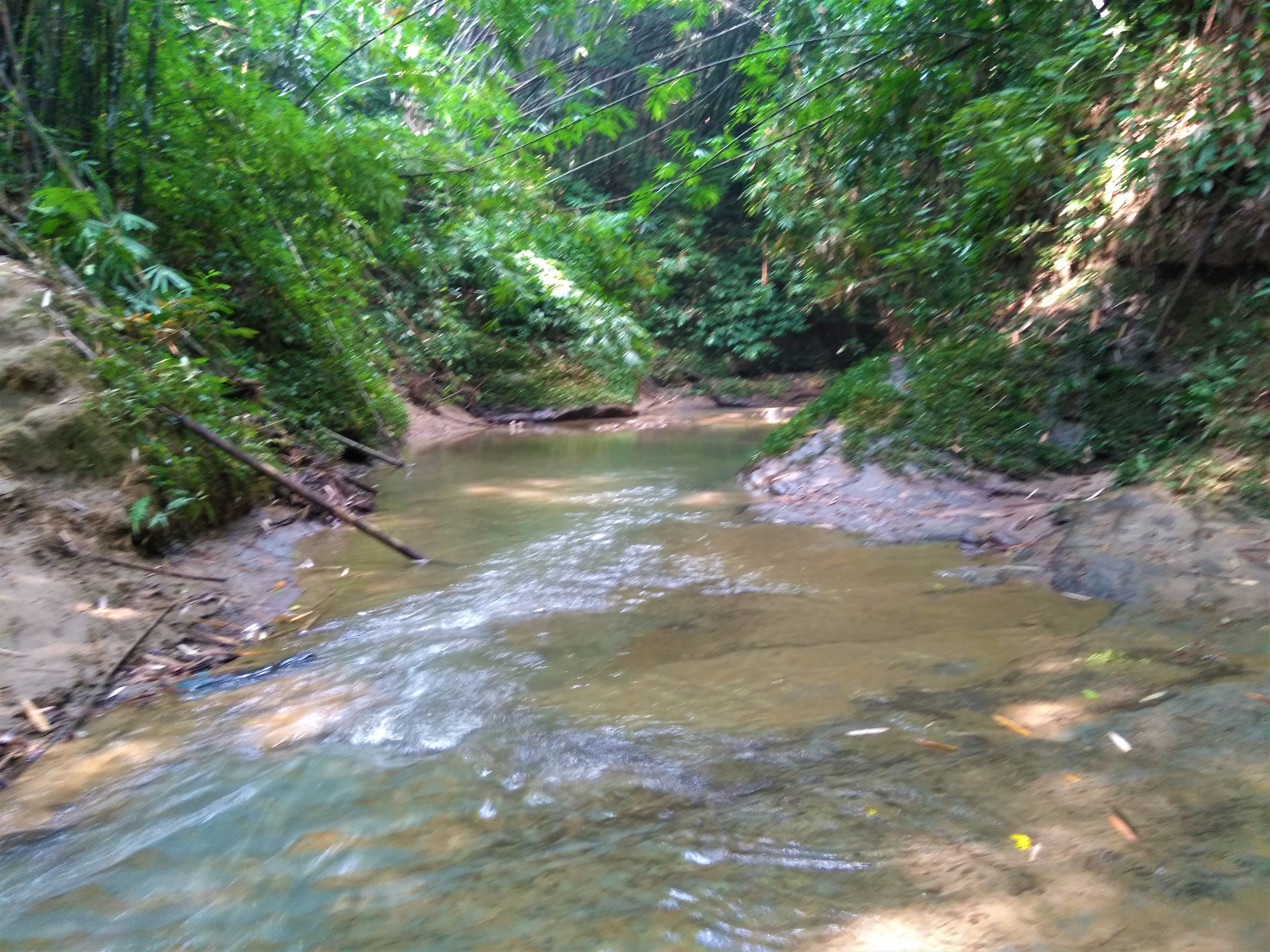

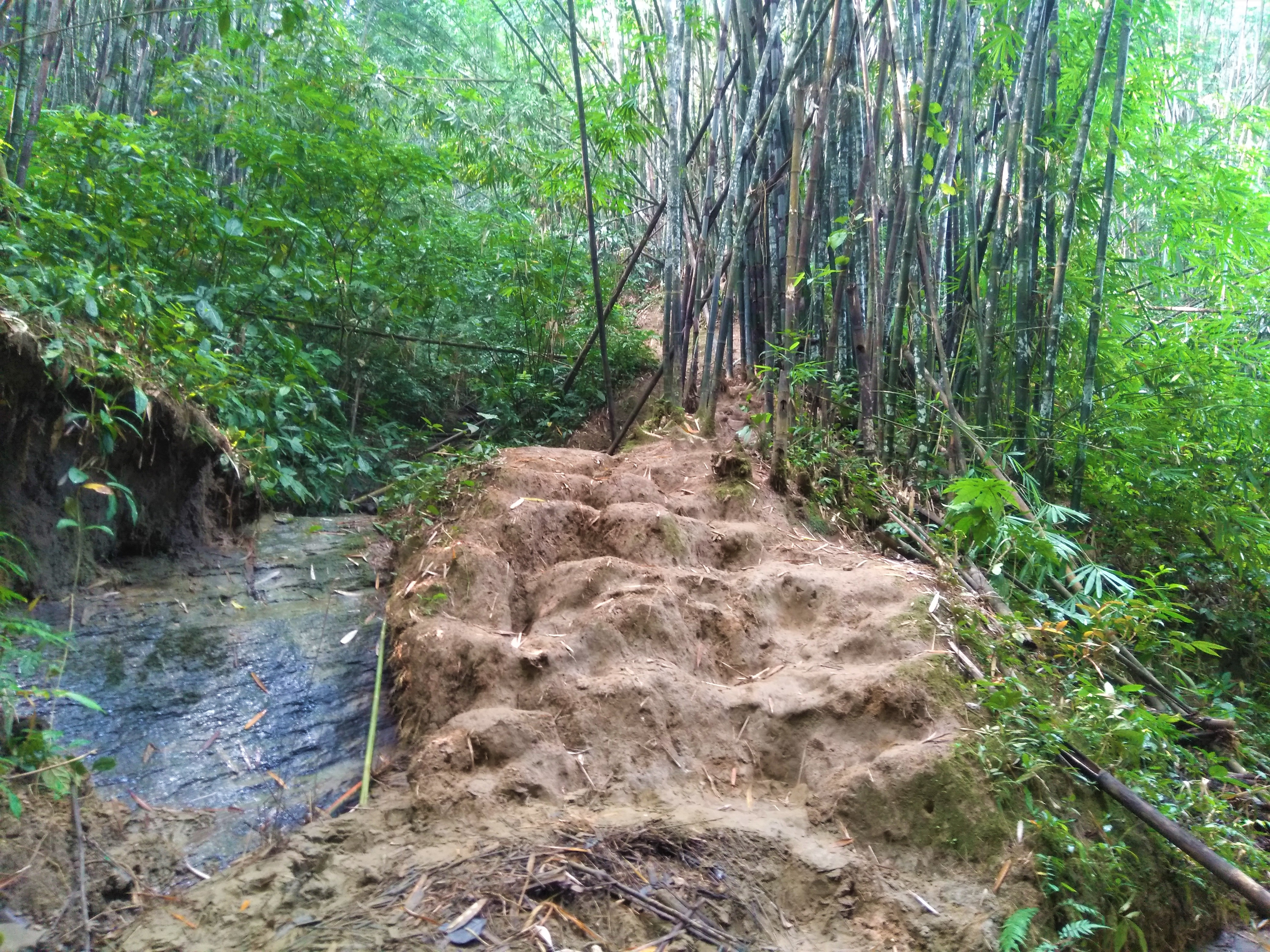

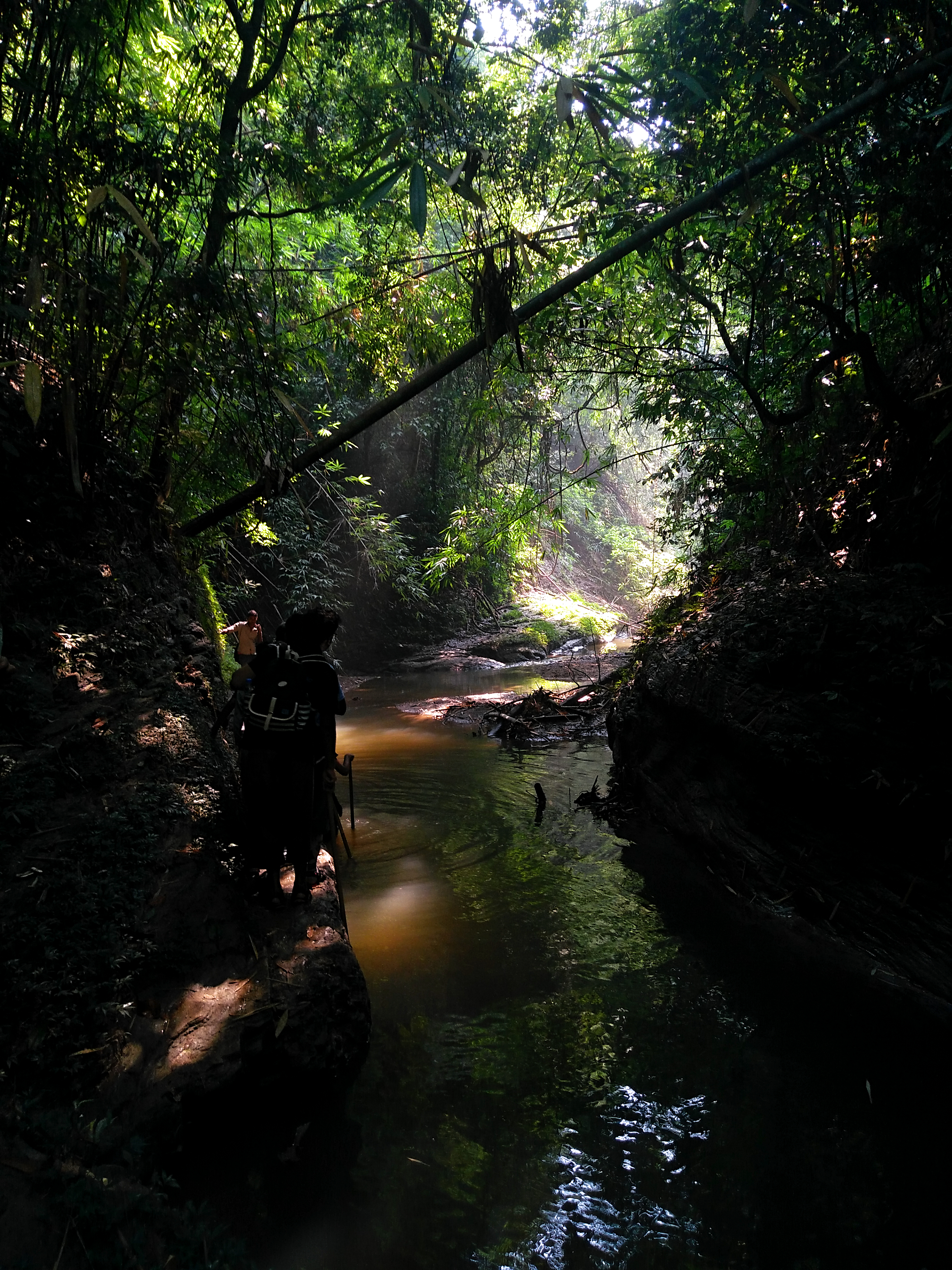

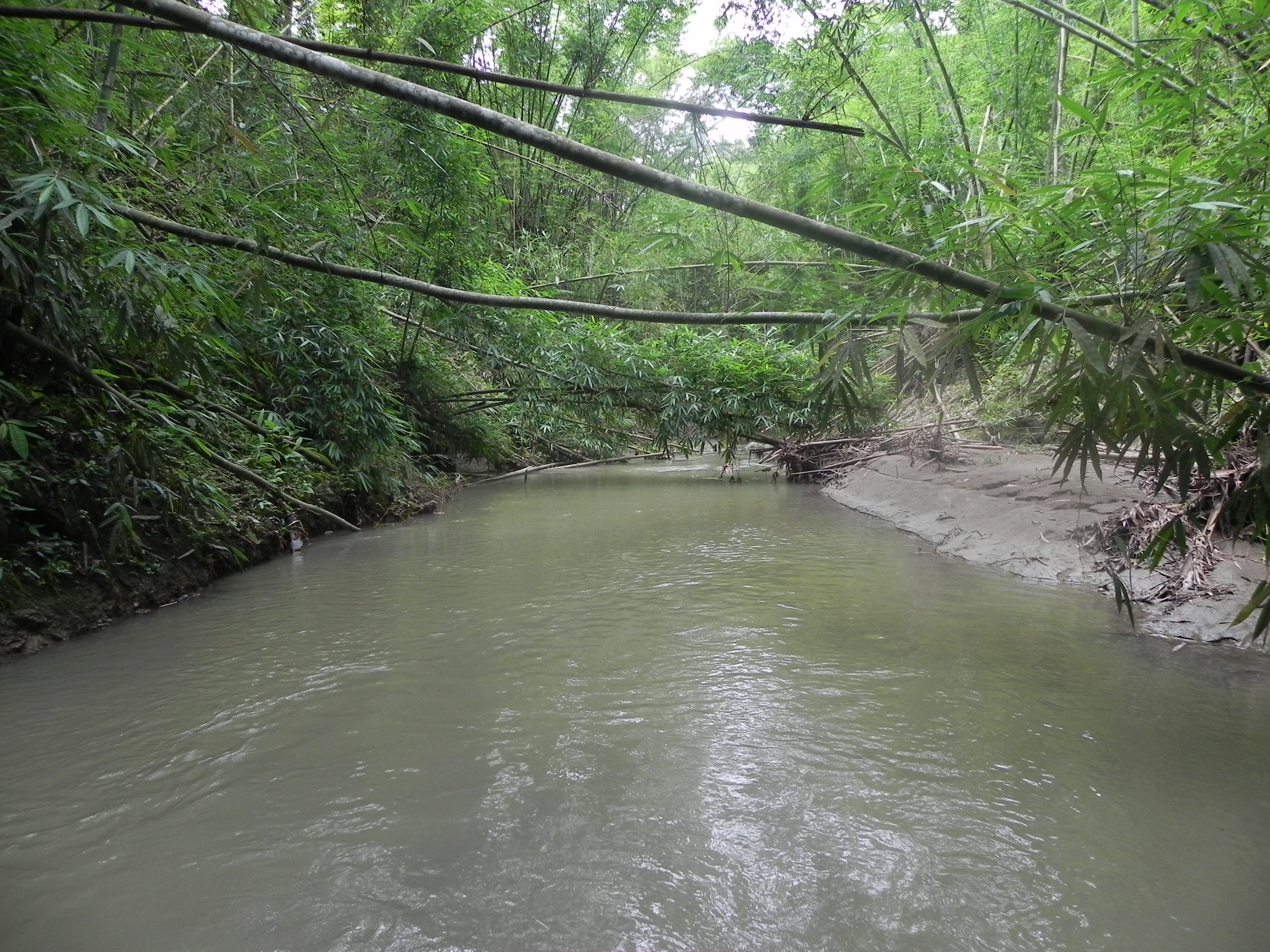

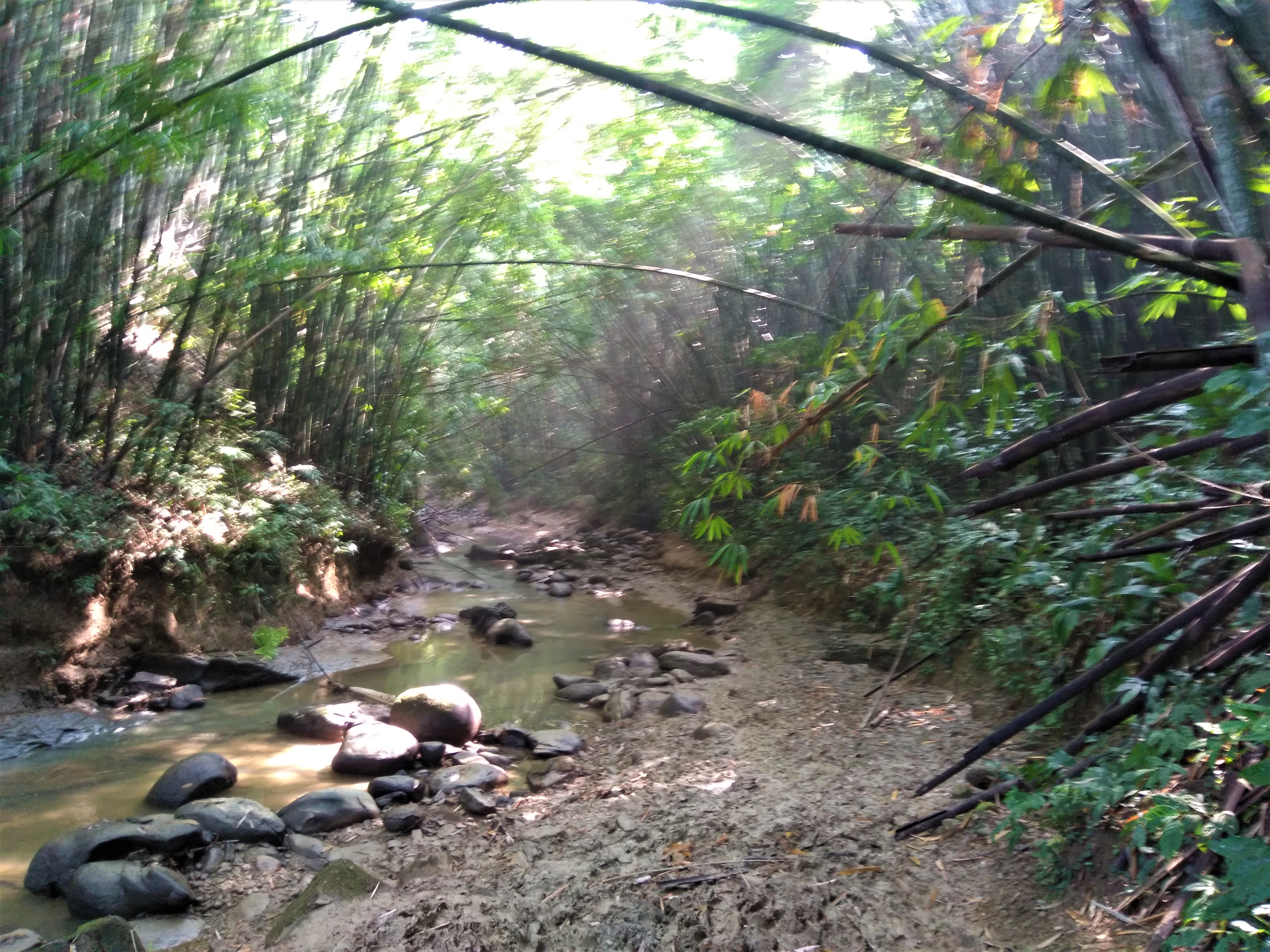

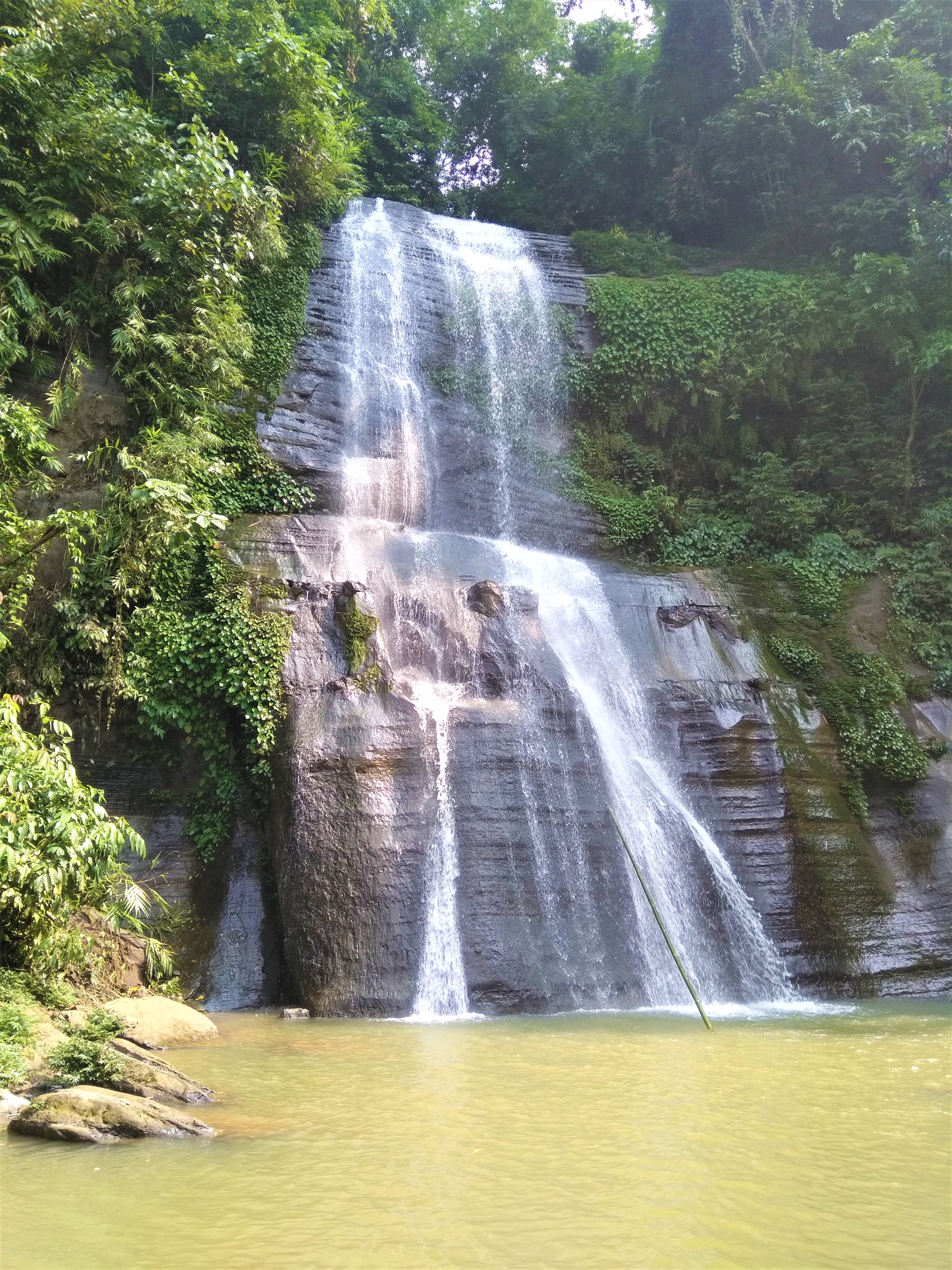

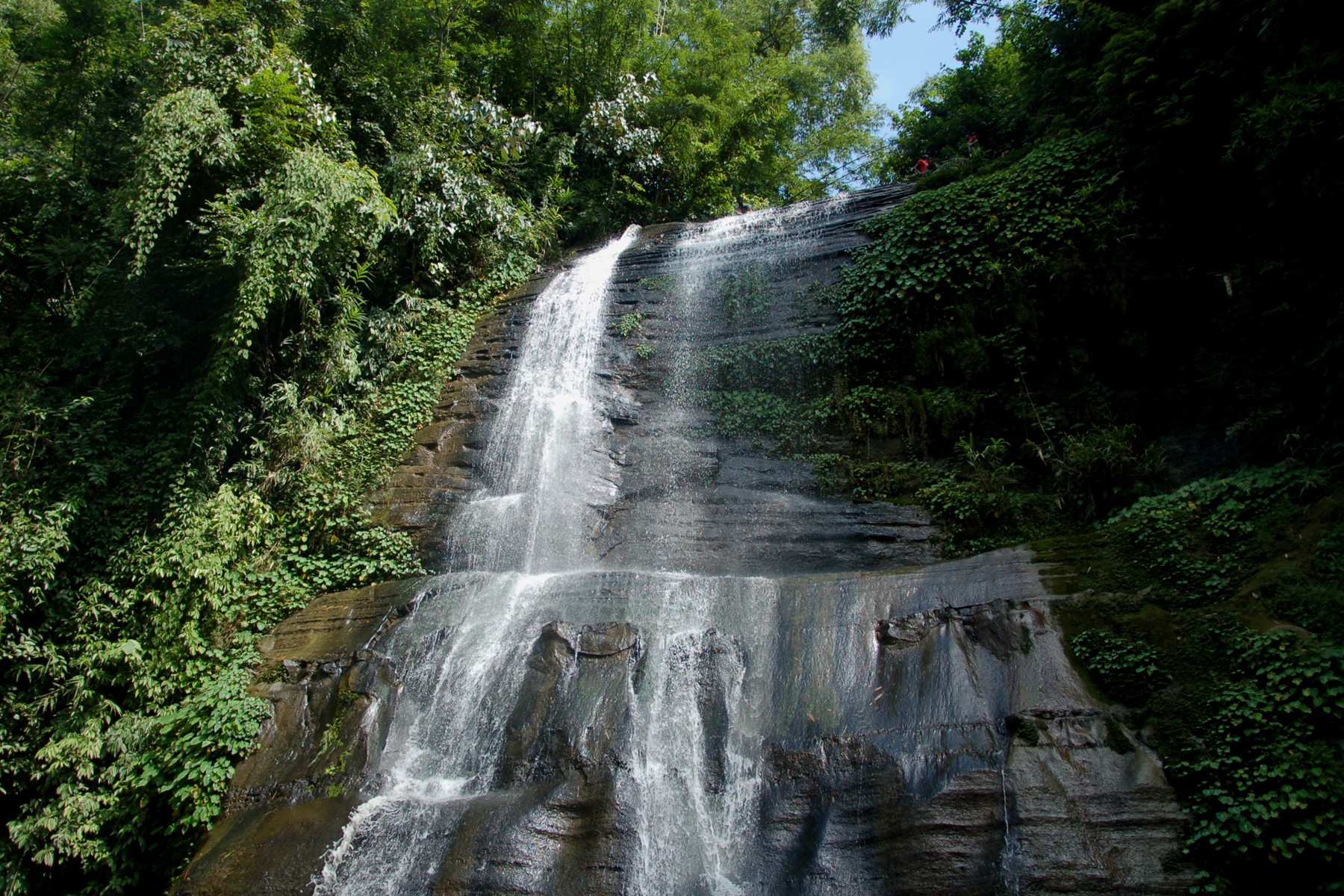

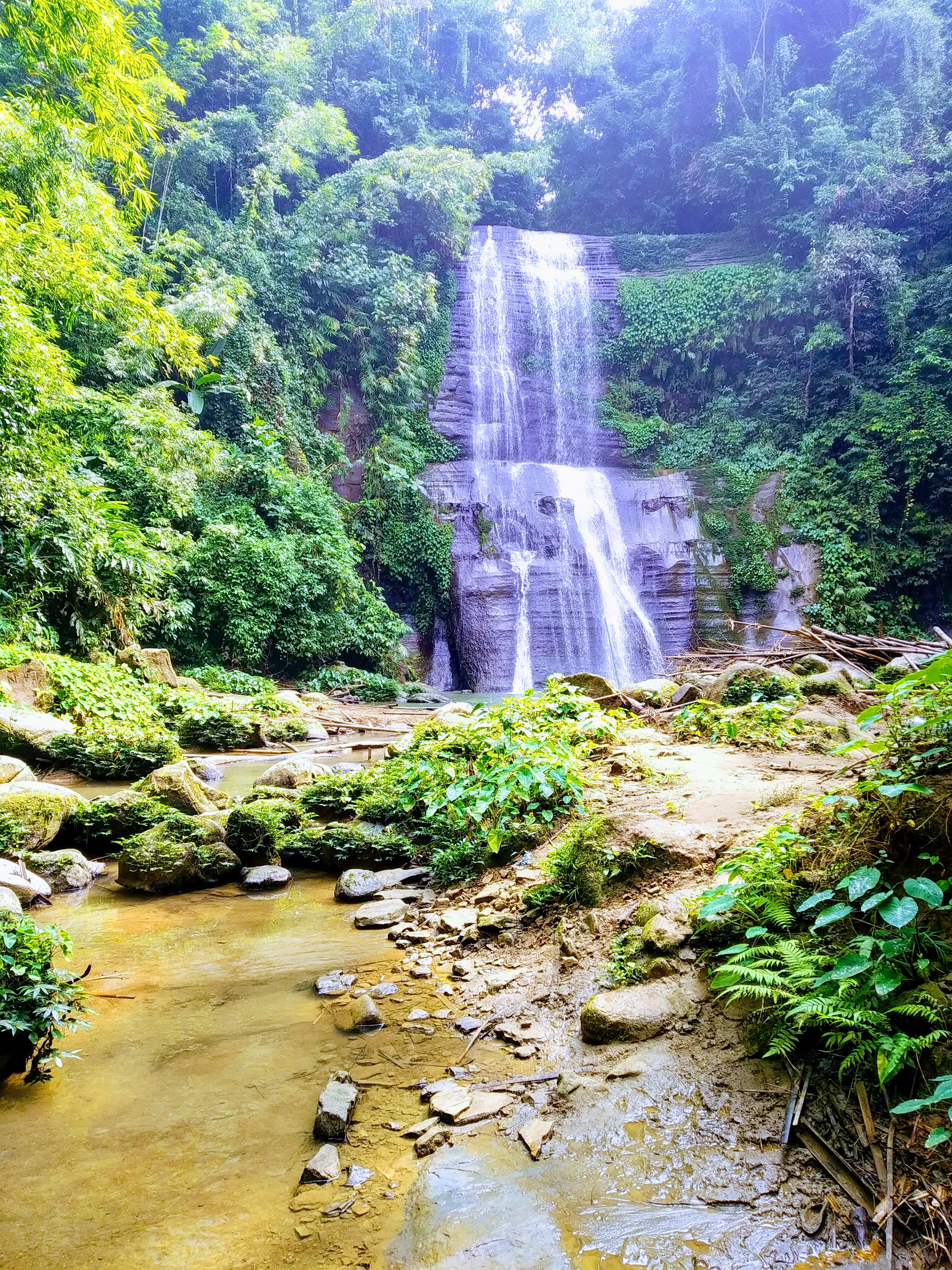

== See also ==
- List of waterfalls
- Madhabkunda waterfall, one of the largest waterfalls in Bangladesh, also located in Maulvibazar District.
