= Madhabkunda Waterfall =

Waterfall in Bangladesh

- মাধবকুণ্ড জলপ্রপাত
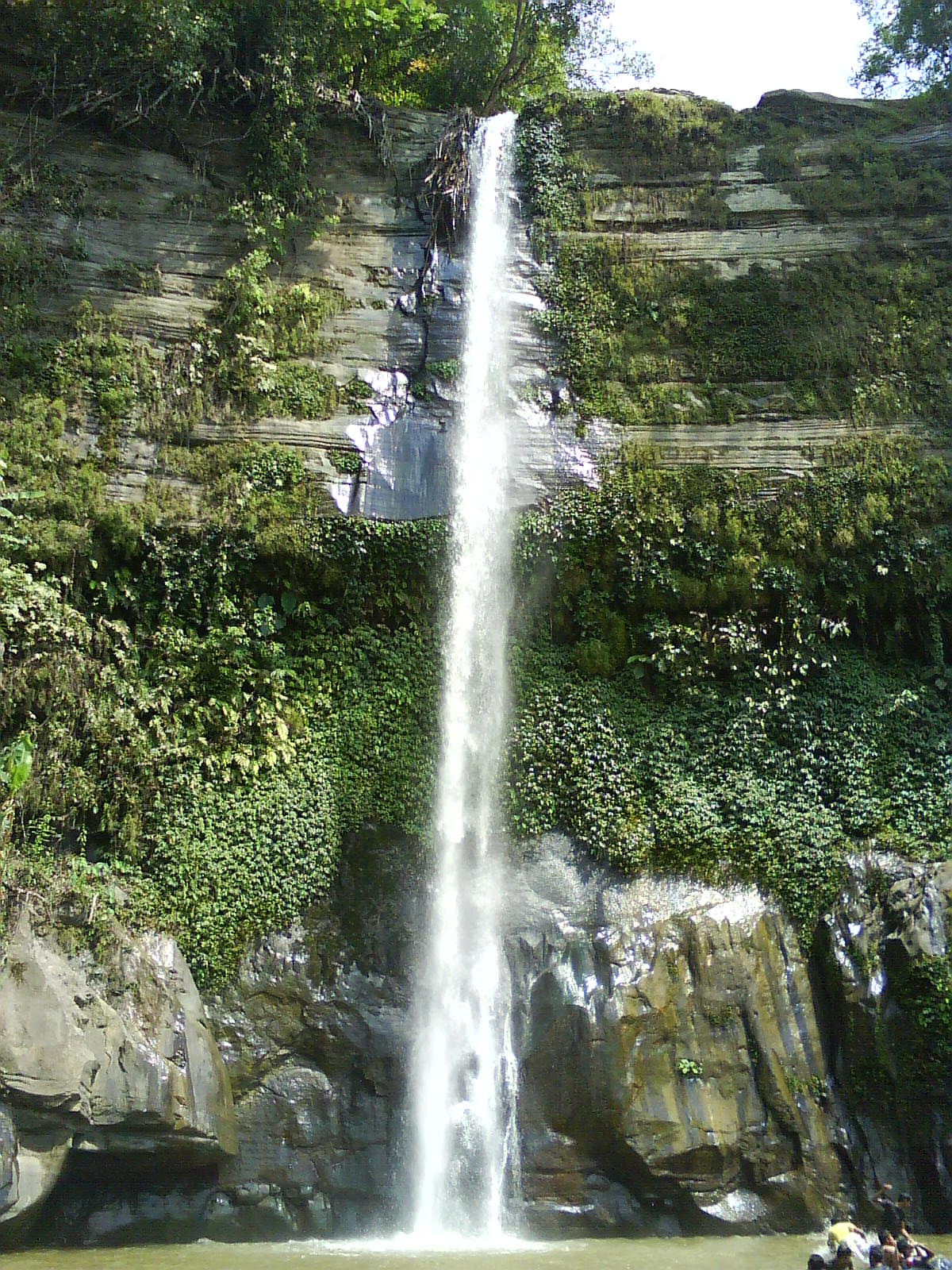
- Interactive map of Madhabkunda Waterfall
- Location: Barlekha Upazila, Moulvibazar District
- Coordinates: 24°38′18.5″N 92°13′28.4″E
- Type: Plunge waterfall
- Total height: 200 feet (61 m)
- Watercourse: Gangamara stream

Madhabkunda Waterfall (Bengali: মাধবকুন্ড জলপ্রপাত) is one of the highest waterfalls in Bangladesh. Situated in Barlekha Upazila of Moulvibazar District, the waterfall is a popular tourist spot in Bangladesh. The forest, streams, and ecological park in the vicinity attract numerous tourists for picnics and day trips.

The area holds significance for Hindus, with a nearby temple where Hindu rituals are performed annually, accompanied by a fair. Adjacent to the pool on the right side lies a cave, revered as a pilgrimage site.

== Geology ==
The Gangamara stream cascades 162 feet (49 m) feet down from the rocky Patharia Hill, forming the Madhabkunda Waterfall, which then transitions into the Madhabchhara stream below. The waters of Madhabchhara flow westward and eventually converge into the Hakaluki Haor.

The main stream typically maintains a steady flow throughout the year. During the monsoon season, a smaller stream forms adjacent to the main one, and as the monsoon intensifies, the two streams converge, combining into a powerful current. This robust flow cascades downward, forming a substantial pool below. The pool's depth increases continuously as water continues to fall into it.

== Toponymy ==
Local hindus believe that Raja Govardhan of Gour, the last Hindu king of Sylhet, encountered a meditating monk named Madhaveshwar while on a hunting expedition in 1335 AD. The monk expressed a desire to unite with the goddess Ganga and requested immersion in the spring. Following the monk's request, he merged with Ganga, and a divine voice uttered "Madhav Madhav Madhav" three times, giving rise to the name Madhabkunda. Another legend suggests the name originates from "Madhav," one of Shiva's names, as it is believed Shiva appeared at this location.

== Environment ==
A tourist site called Madhabkunda Eco Park has been established in proximity to the waterfall with an area of about 500 acres (2.0 km^{2}), attracting numerous tourists each year. Surrounding the waterfall is a vast forest area inhabited by the indigenous Khasi tribe. Another nearby attraction is the Parikunda waterfall.

== Transport ==
The waterfall is located at 24°38′18.5″N 92°13′28.4″E. It is about five km away from Dakshinbagh Railway Station. Visitors can visit Madhabkunda either from Sylhet or Moulvibazar by road, or from Kulaura Junction by train.

== Gallery ==
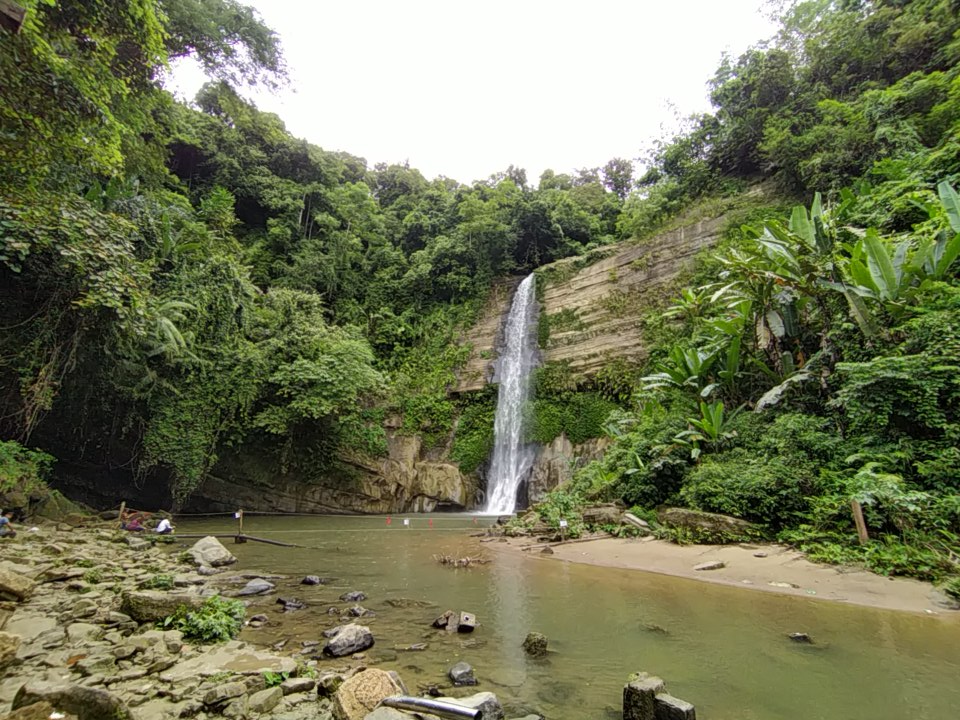
View of Madhabkunda

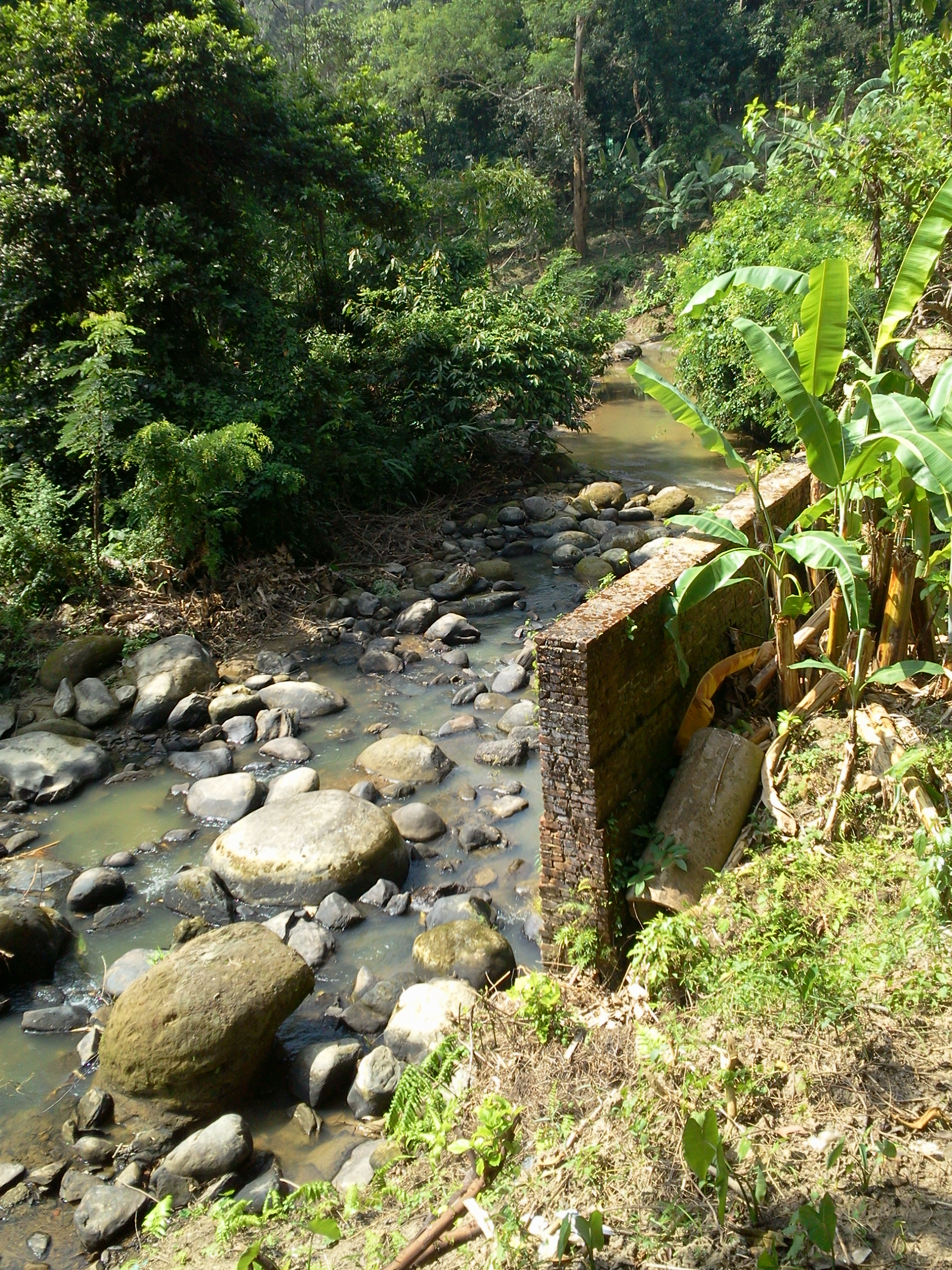
Stream near Madhabkunda Waterfall

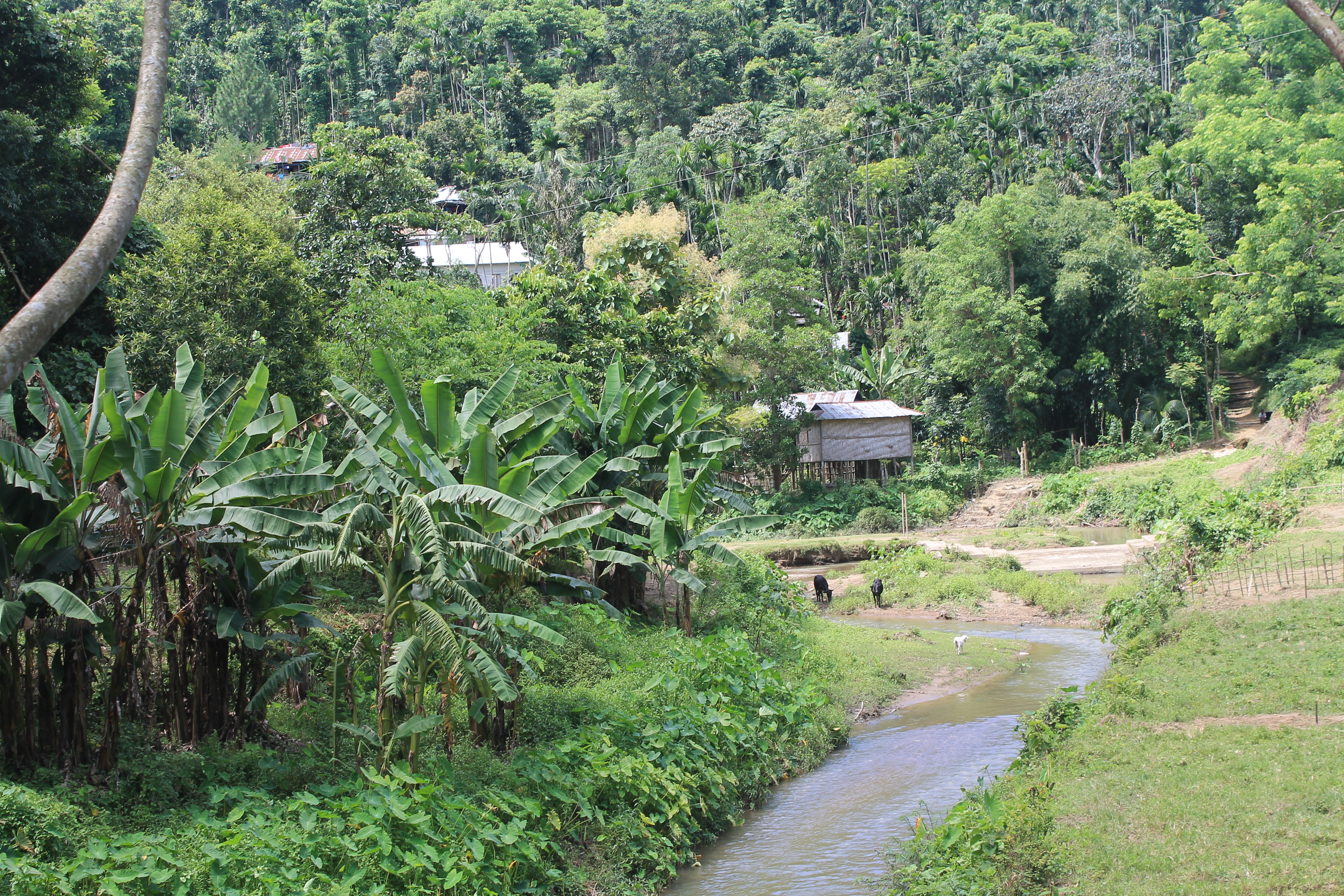
Tribal village and stream near Madhabkunda

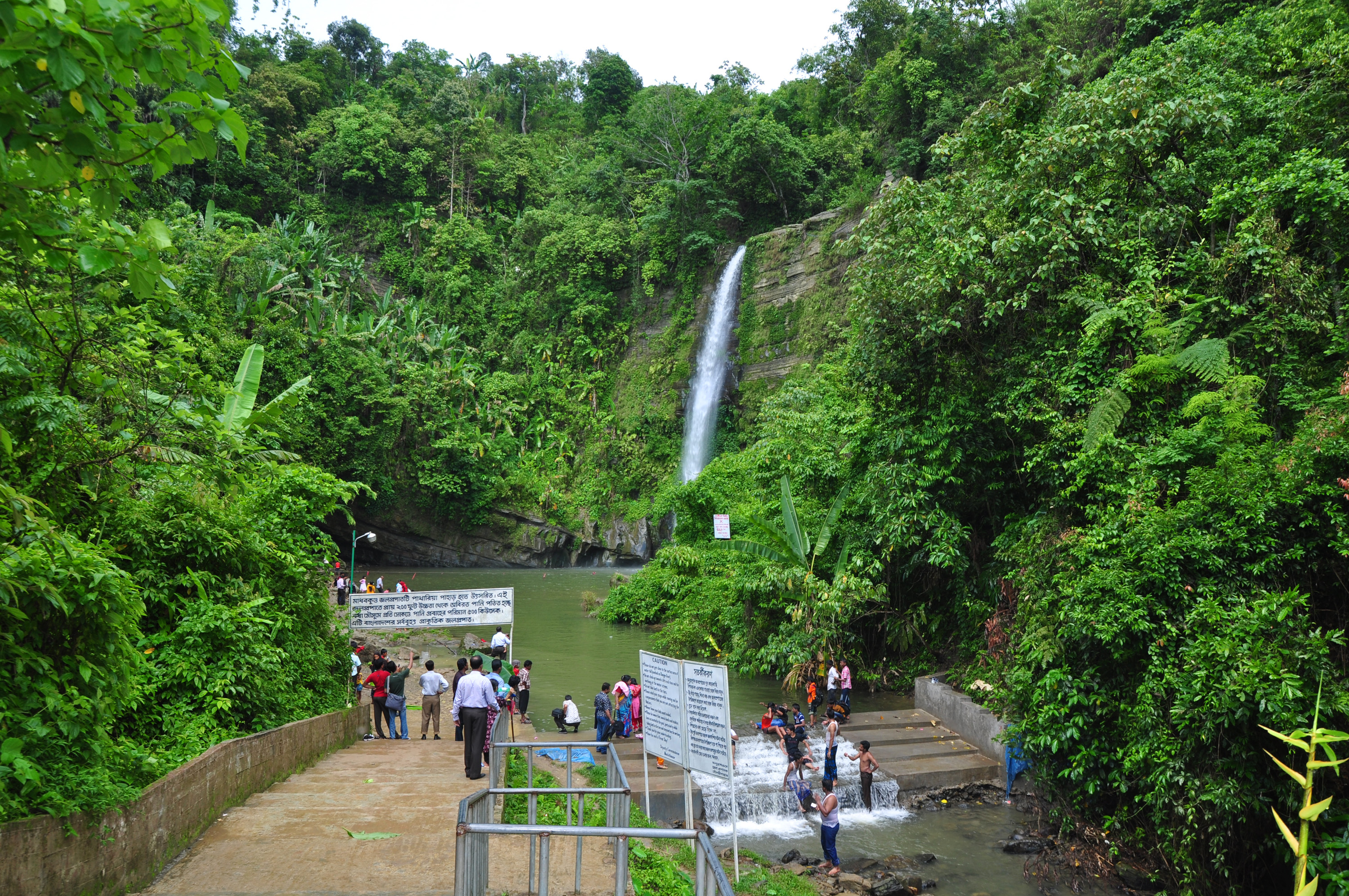
Stairs leading to the waterfall

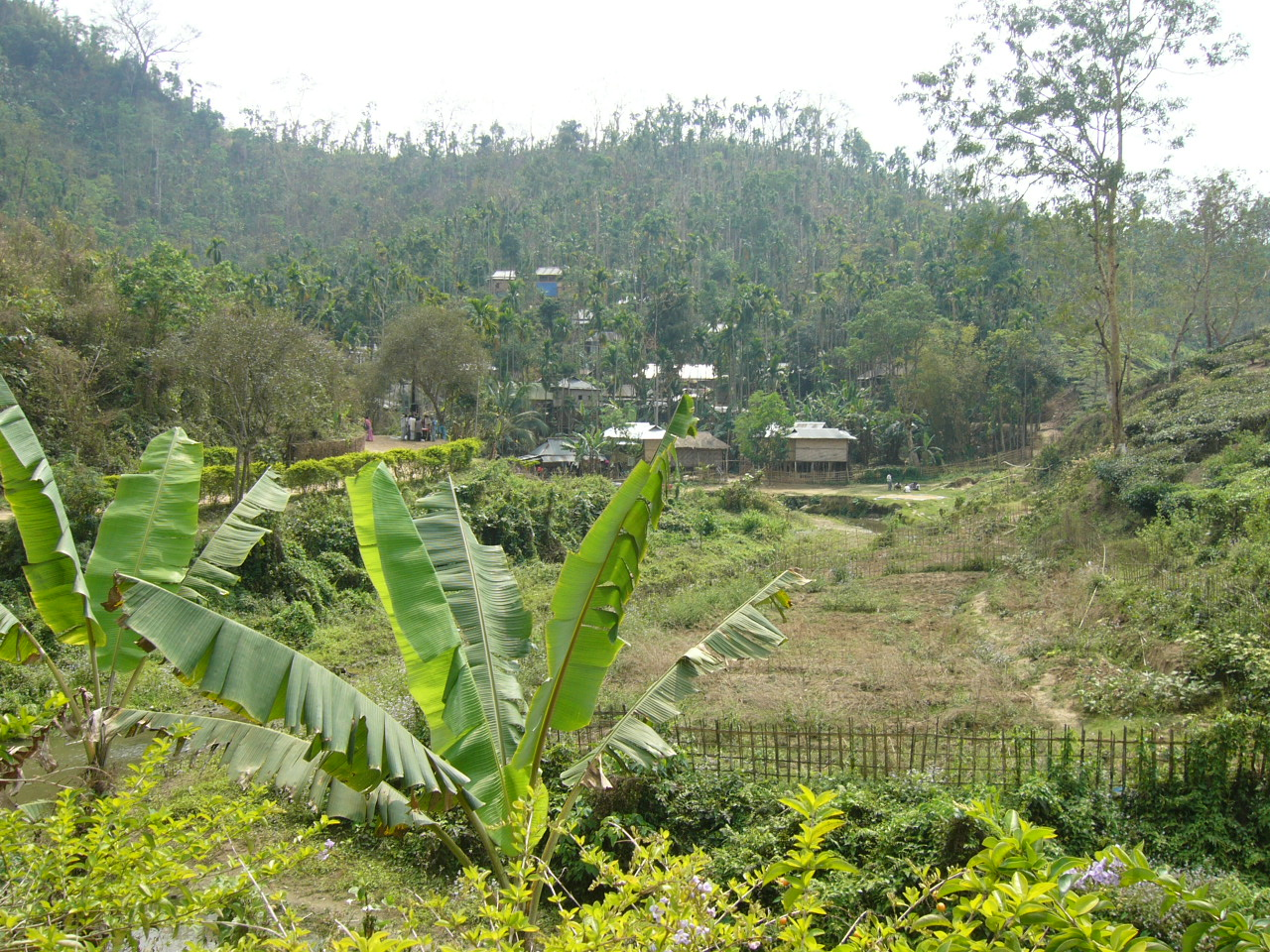
Tribal village near Madhabkunda Waterfall

== See also ==
- List of waterfalls
- Hum Hum
