= Jiladpur Mosque =

Mosque in Srimangal, Bangladesh

- জিলাদপুর মসজিদ
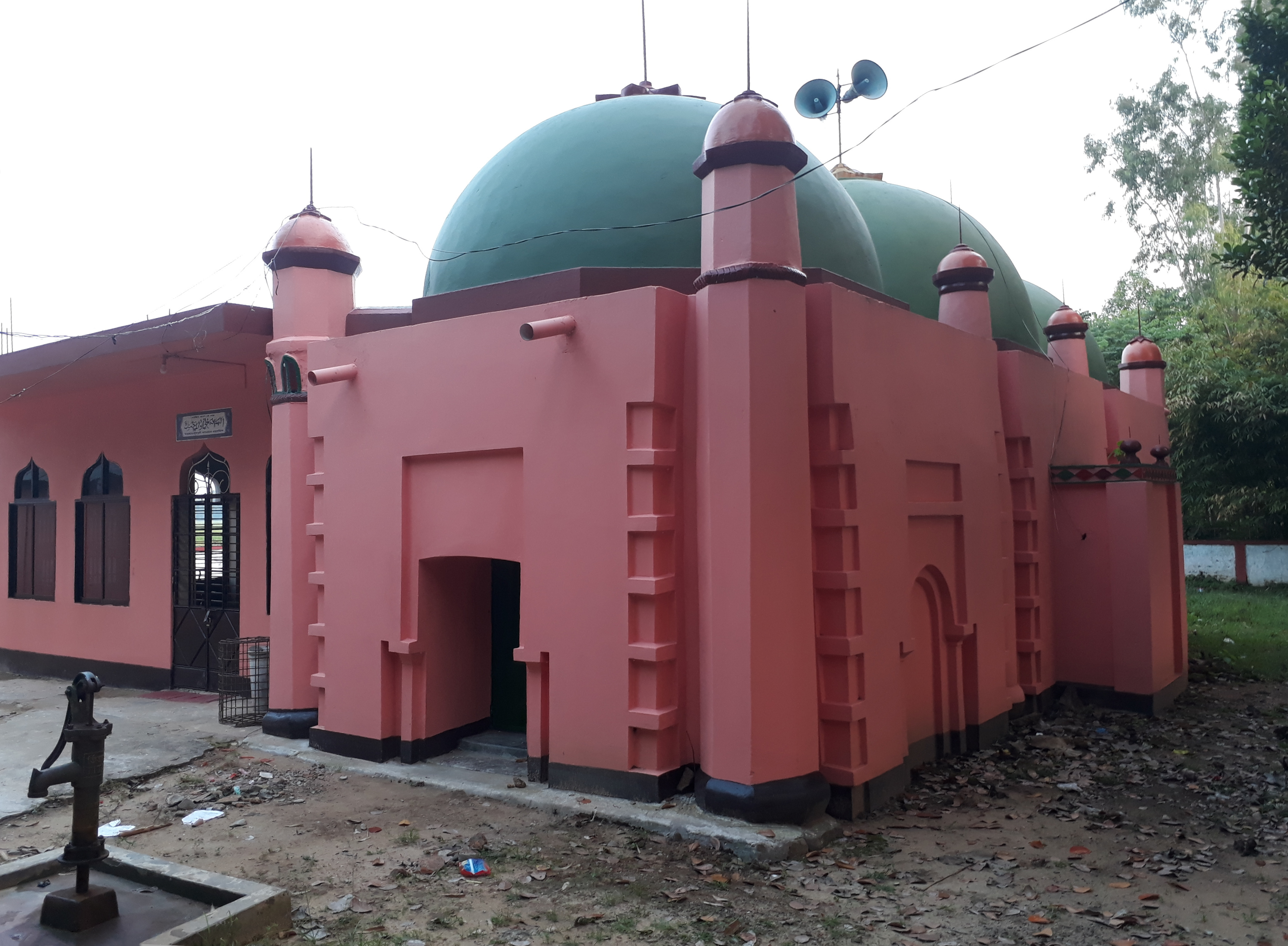
- The mosque in 2019

Religion
- Affiliation: Sunni Islam
- Ecclesiastical or organizational status: Mosque
- Status: Active

Location
- Location: Srimangal, Moulvibazar District, Sylhet Division
- Country: Bangladesh

Architecture
- Type: Mosque architecture
- Style: Islamic; Mughal
- Completed: 16th century
- Dome: 3

The Jiladpur Mosque (Bengali: জিলাদপুর মসজিদ, Arabic: مسجد جلادفور) is an ancient three-domed mosque in Moulvibazar District, in the Sylhet Division of Bangladesh. It is believed that the mosque was built in the late 1500s CE.

== Location ==
The mosque is located in the village of Jiladpur (West Ashidron) in Ward 1 of Sreemangal Upazila's Ashidron Union Council. It sits on the banks of the Bilash River. The mosque is visited by people from all over the country by Muslims and non-Muslims alike.

== Folklore ==
There is a local legend about the construction of the mosque. According to the tale, one day, a gathering of villagers convened by the banks of the Bilash River. They collectively decided to embark on the construction of a mosque. Eagerly, they began planning immediately, and by day's end, they had sketched out a rough blueprint for the mosque's construction. They went to sleep intending that construction should start the next day. When the villagers woke up the next day and went to the site, they saw a three-domed lime-brick mosque, and had no idea where and who it came from. Even today, the Jiladpur Mosque, is referred to as a "Ghayebi mosque" (গায়েবী মসজিদ) as they believe it was built by Muslim jinns in one night.

== Architecture ==
No rods or brick-and-cement was used to build this mosque which is peculiar to other mosques in region. The quantity of domes being three resembles Mughal architecture styles. It site spans 0.012 square kilometres (3 acres) and has capacity for up to 150 worshippers. The mosque is regularly painted and refurbished, and the locals have established a separate toilet, wudukhana, and verandah.

== See also ==
- Islam in Bangladesh
- List of mosques in Bangladesh
