= Madhobpur Lake =

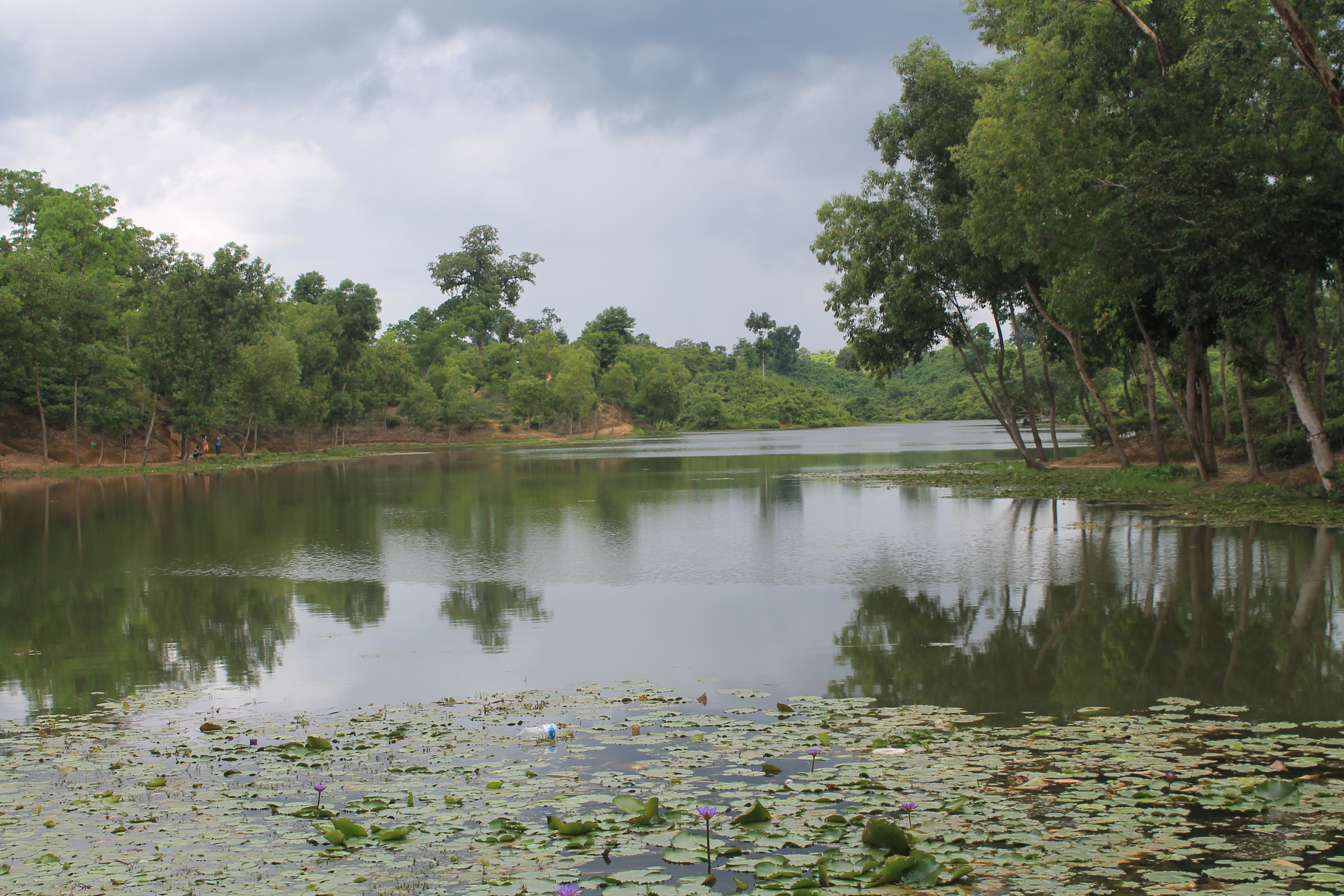
- Lake fringed with water lilies

- Location within Bangladesh
- Location: Kamalganj Upazila, Moulvibazar District, Bangladesh
- Coordinates: 24.2812°N 91.8181°E
- Type: Lake

Madhobpur Lake is a lake in Kamalganj Upazila, Moulvibazar District, Bangladesh within the Madhabpur tea estate.

== Wildlife ==
It is the only confirmed site in Bangladesh that is home to the great white-bellied heron.

== Gallery ==
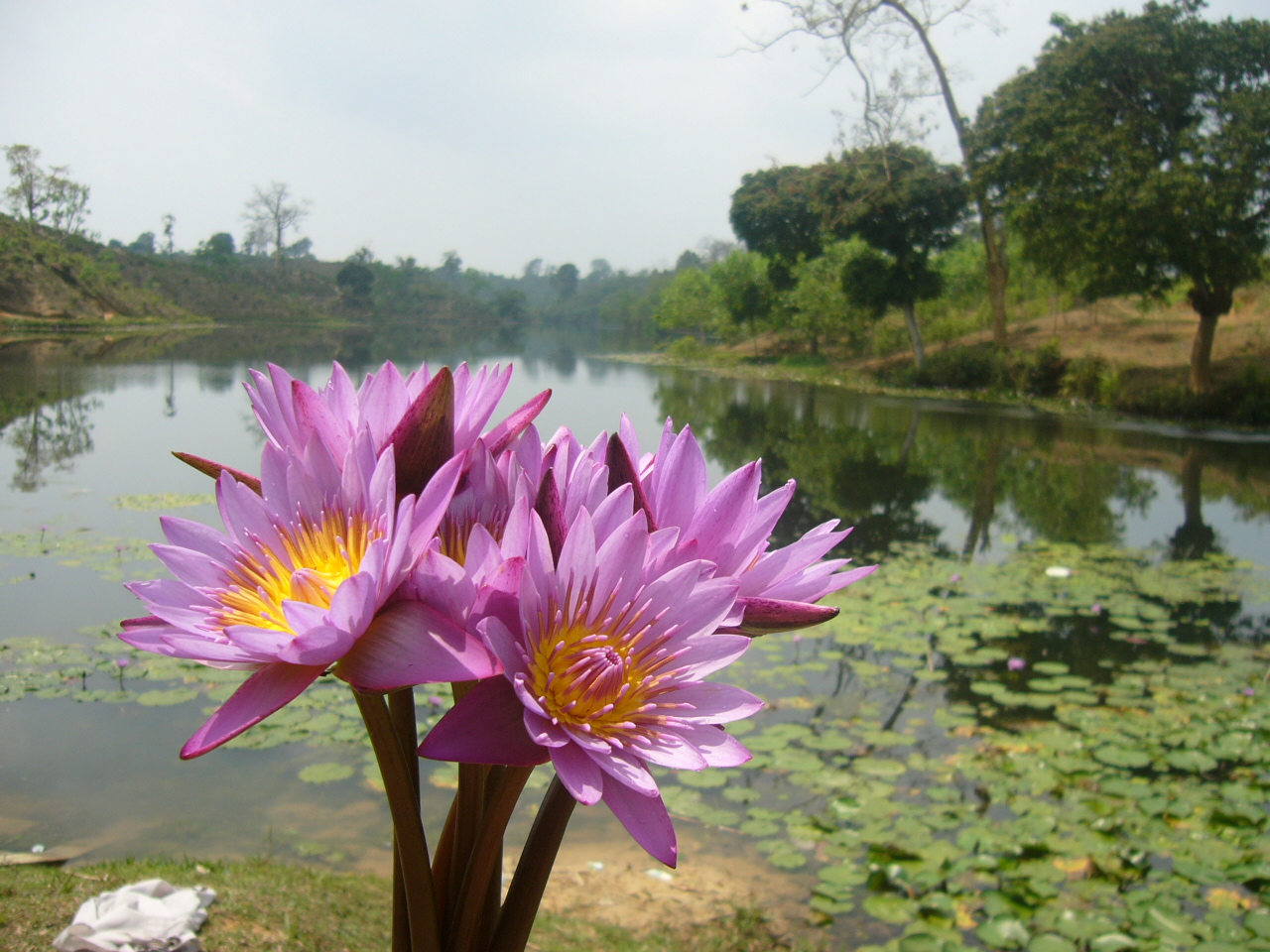
Blue lotus in the lake

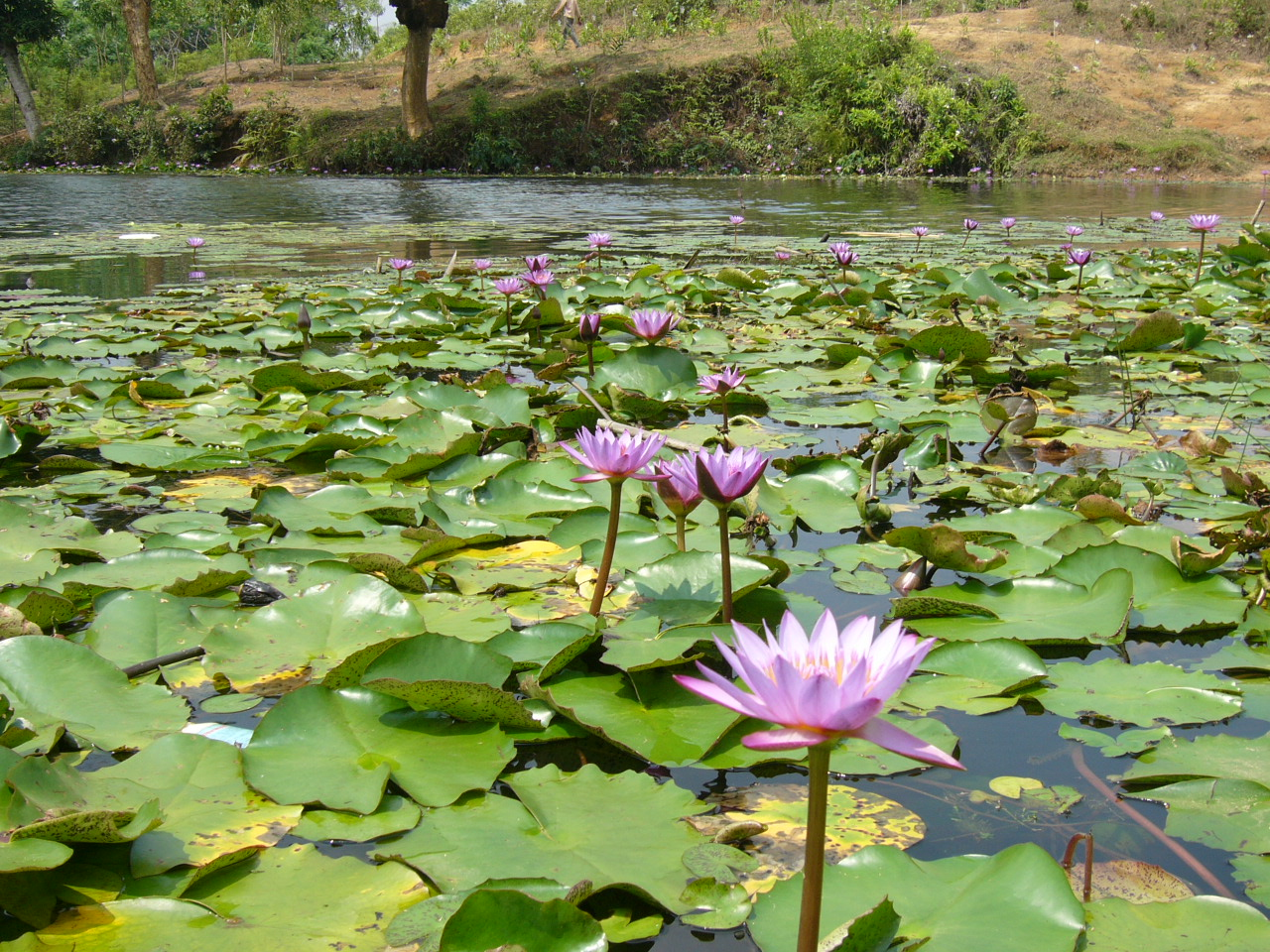
Water lily in the lake

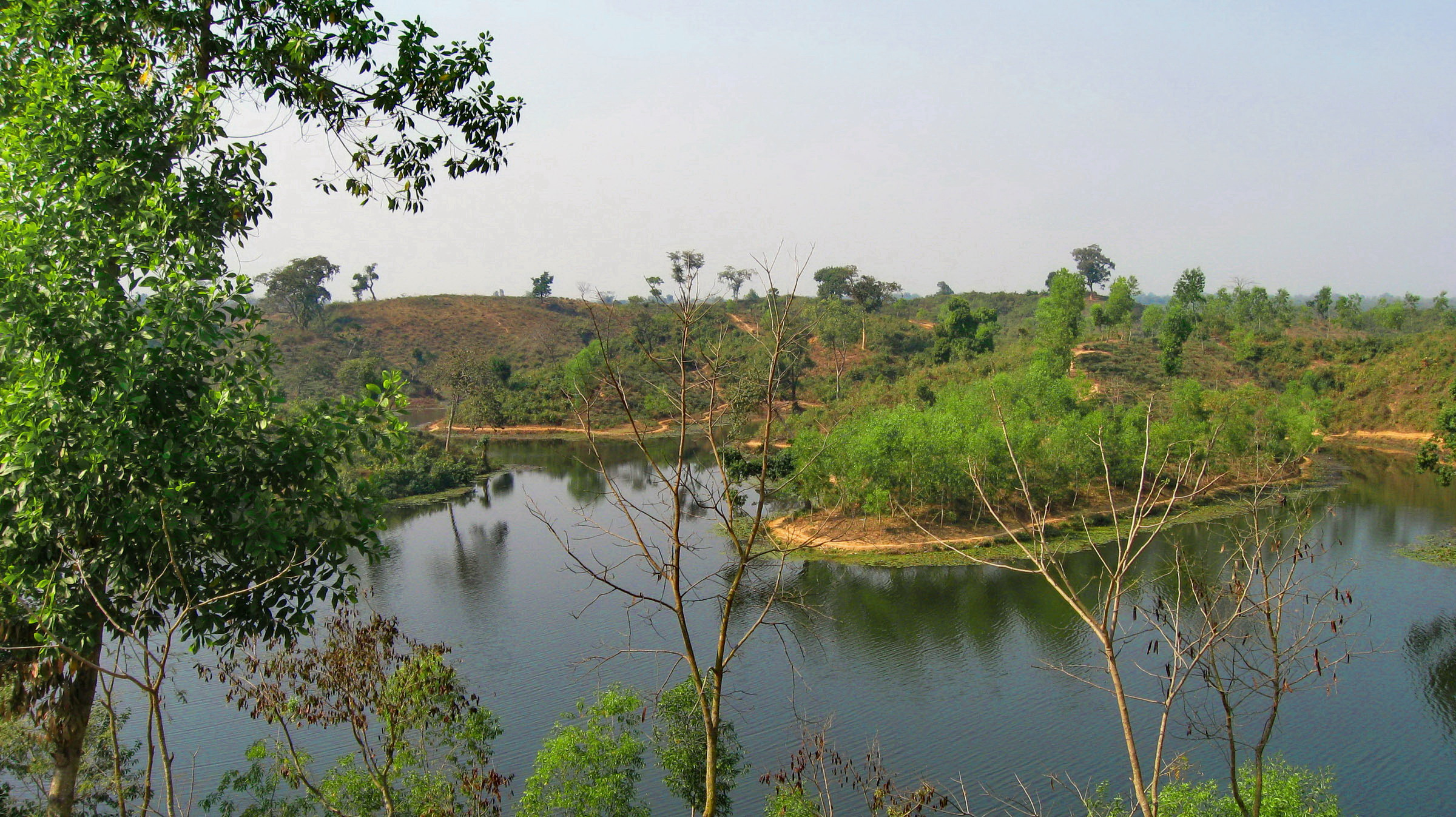
The lake from surrounding hill

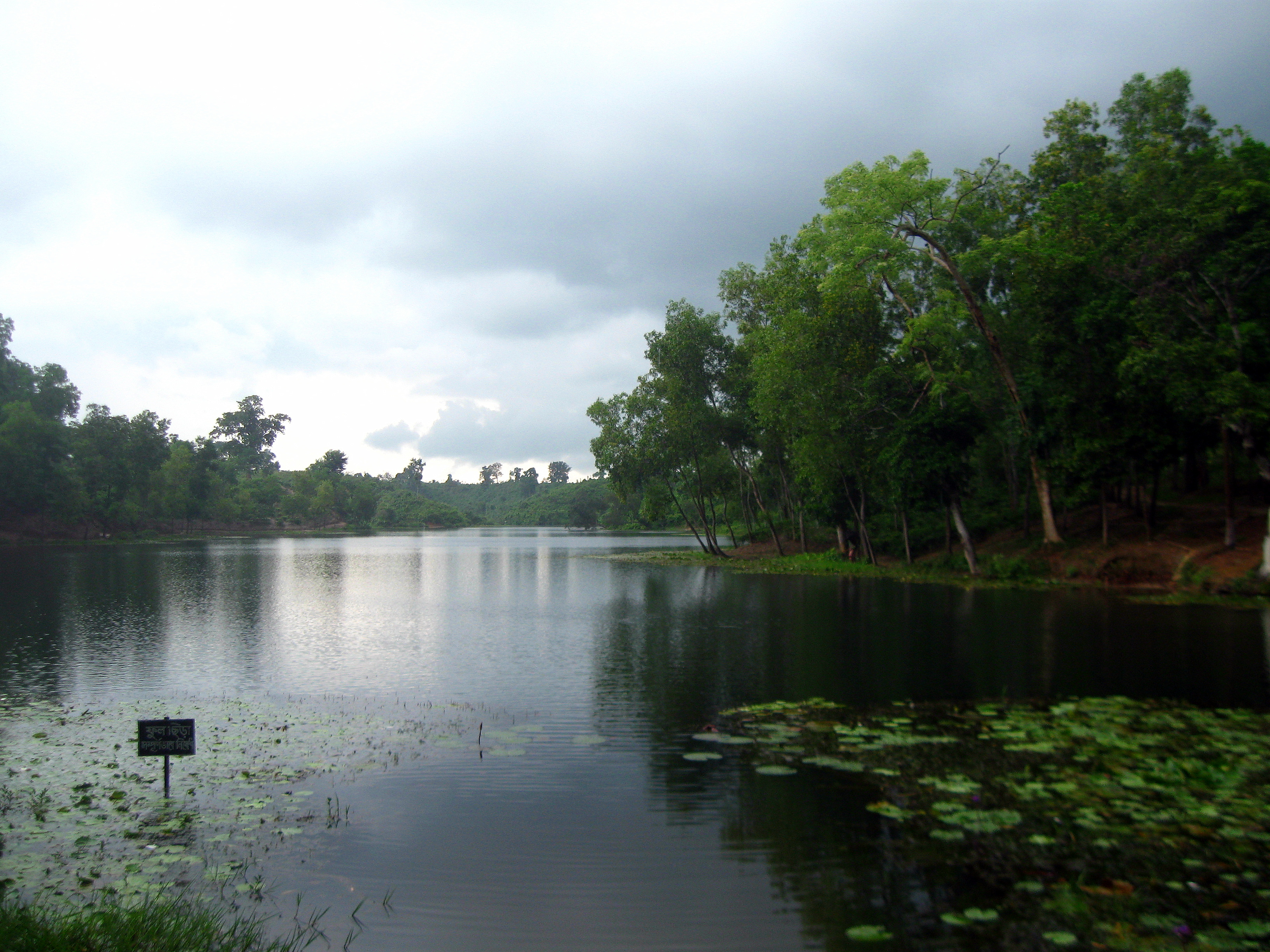
Madhobpur lake

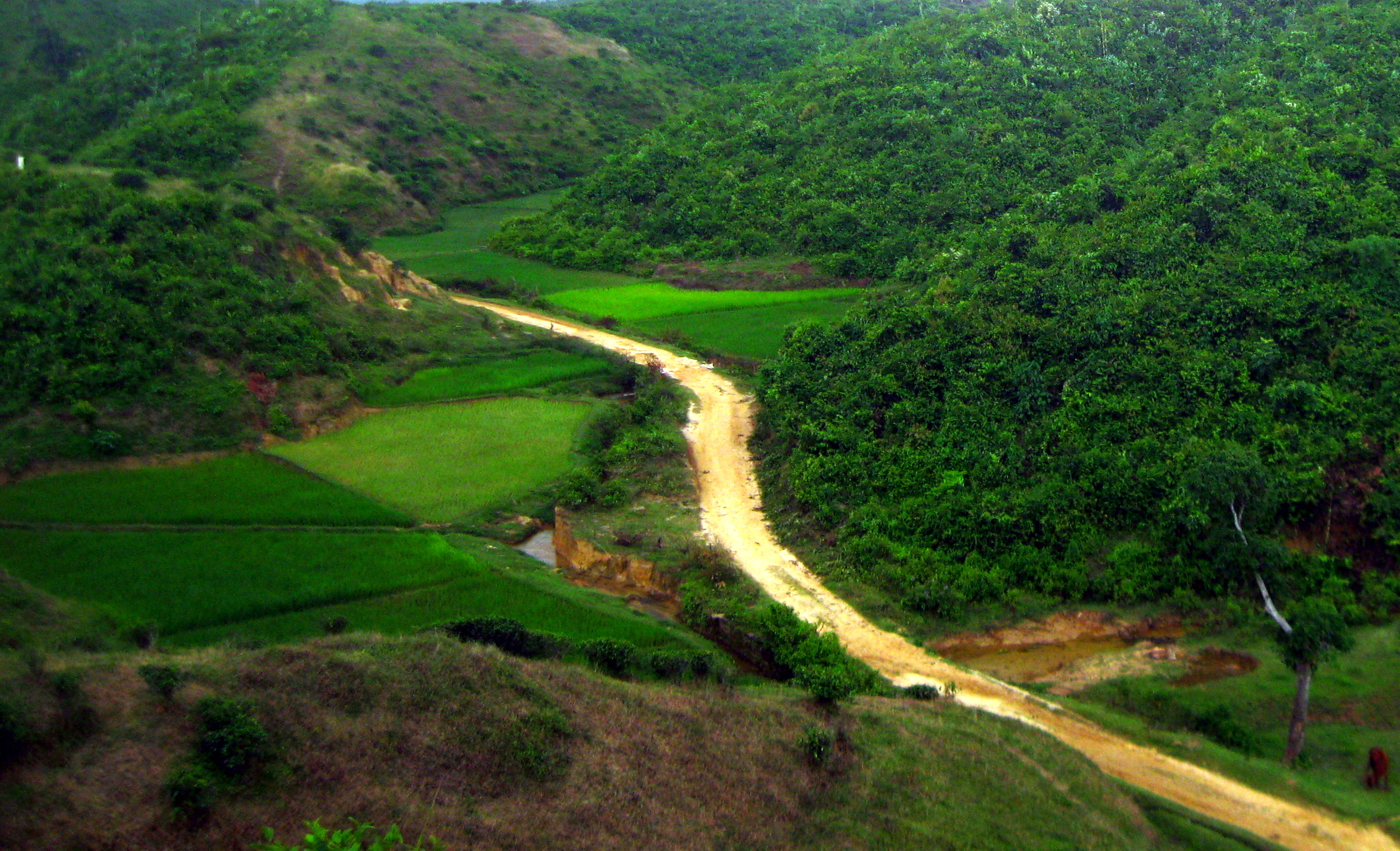
Surrounding landscape and greenery

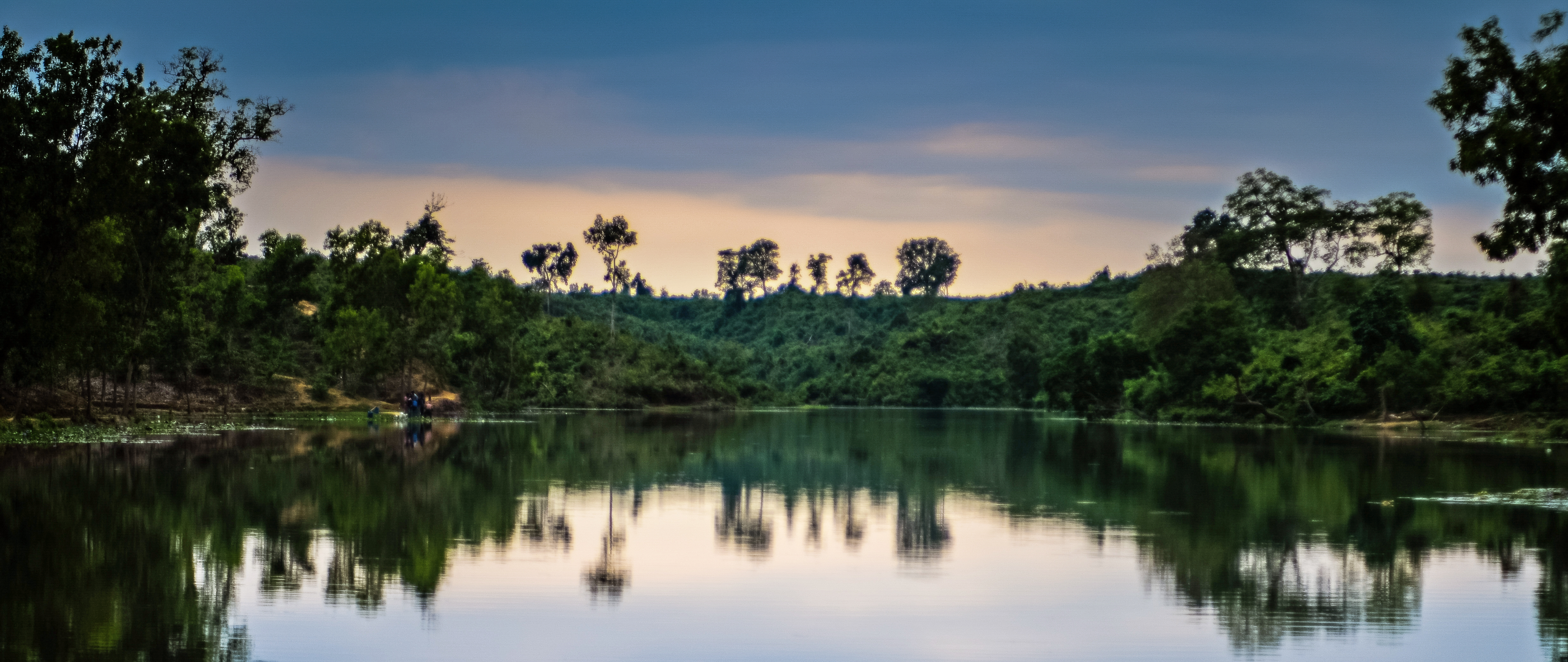
Sunset at Madhobpur Lake
