= Karam =

Karam may refer to:

== Culture and media ==
- Karam (album), by Kimi Djabate, 2009
- Karam (festival), a religious festival for the worship of god Karam-Devta
- Karam (2005 film), a Indian Hindi-language action thriller film
- Karam (2025 film), an Indian Malayalam-language action thriller film
- Karam (TV series), a 2001–2002 Indian Hindi-language soap opera

== Other uses ==
- Karam, Iran, or Koram, a village in Kerman Province
- Karam (name), a given name and surname
- El Karam, a political party in Mauritania
- Jamia Al-Karam, an Islamic college in Eaton, UK
  - Al Karam Secondary School, Islamic boarding school

== See also ==
- Karm (disambiguation)
- Karma (disambiguation)
- Karim (disambiguation)
- Karem (disambiguation)
- Karamah (disambiguation)
- Karameh (disambiguation)
- Karamat (disambiguation)
- Garam (disambiguation)
- Carrom, a family of tableboard games
- Kerem, a name
- Kerim, a name
