= Karam (name) =

Karam is a given name and a surname of Arabic origin. People with the name include:

== Given name ==
=== First name ===
- Karam Gaber (born 1979), Egyptian Greco-Roman wrestler
- Karam Hasanov (born 1969), Azerbaijani politician
- Karam Chand Jain (1898–1967), Indian public administrator
- Karam Khamis Sayd Khamsan (born 1969), Yemeni citizen detained at Guantanamo Bay
- Karam Mashour (born 1991), Israeli basketball player
- Karam Nayyerloo (1943–1983), Iranian footballer
- Karam Chand Ramrakha (1933–2021), Fiji Indian lawyer
- Karam Ali Shah (1934–2020), Pakistani politician
- Karam Shyam (born 1962), Indian politician
- Karam Singh (historian) (1884–1930), Sikh historian
- Karam Singh (1915–1993), Indian soldier
- Karam Chand Thapar (1900–1962), Indian businessman

=== Middle name ===
- Babu Karam Singh Bal (1927–1992), Indian politician and Sarpanch for Sathiala

== Surname ==
- Alfredo Karam (1925–2024), Brazilian military officer and politician
- Antoine Karam (French Guianan politician) (born 1950), President of the Regional Council of French Guiana 1992–2010
- Antoine Karam (Lebanese politician) (born 1956), Lebanese politician
- Aram Karam (1929–2023), Iraqi footballer
- Elias Karam (born 1960), Assyrian singer from Syria
- Fares Karam (born 1973), Lebanese singer
- Farid Karam, member of the World Scout Committee
- Guilherme Karan (1957–2016), Brazilian actor
- Isabel Allende Karam, Cuban diplomat
- Jaïr Karam (born 1976), French football player and manager
- Jean Michel Karam (born 1969), Franco-Lebanese engineer, inventor and entrepreneur
- Jesús Murillo Karam (born 1948), Mexican lawyer and politician
- Joe Karam (born 1951), New Zealand rugby player
- Joey Karam, American musician
- Joseph Philippe Karam (1923–1976), Lebanese architect
- Leïla Karam (1928–2008), Lebanese actress
- Marc Karam (born 1980), Canadian professional poker player
- Melhem Karam (1932–2010), Lebanese writer and journalist
- Michael Karam (born 1965), English-born Lebanese author and journalist
- Mohammed Karam (born 1955), Kuwaiti footballer
- Najwa Karam (born 1966), Lebanese singer
- Natacha Karam (born 1995), British actress
- Sage Karam (born 1995), American racing driver
- Salam Karam (born 1975), Swedish journalist
- Salim Bey Karam (born 1946), Lebanese politician
- Shadi A. Karam (born 1948), Lebanese businessman
- Simon Karam (born 1950), lawyer and diplomat
- Stephen Karam (born 1980), American playwright
- Tony Karam, founder of Canadian radio station CHOU (AM)
- Youssef Bey Karam (1823–1889), Lebanese Maronite rebel
- Youssef Salim Karam (1910–1972), Lebanese politician

== See also ==
- Karam (disambiguation)
