= Karami =

Karami (Arabic: كرامي) is an Arabic-based Lebanese surname, particularly that of a famous Lebanese Sunni Muslim political family. It is often francicised in the media as Karamé. It is to be differentiated from the Classical Arabic term Karamah (Arabic: كرامة) and its colloquial form, Karameh.

Karami is also a common Persian language surname (Persian: کرمی)

Karami may refer to:

== Lebanese political family ==
Also commonly written as francicized Karamé

- Abdul Hamid Karami (1890–1950), Lebanese political and religious leader
- Ahmad Karami (1944–2020), Lebanese statesman
- Faisal Karami (born 1971), Lebanese politician
- Omar Karami (1934–2015), Prime Minister of Lebanon
- Rashid Karami (1921–1987), Lebanese statesman

== Iranian-based surname ==
Based on the Persian surname کرمی

- Abdollah Karami (born 1983), Iranian footballer
- Mohammad Sadegh Karami (born 1984), Iranian footballer
- Mohsen Karami (born 1995), Iranian footballer
- Shahab Karami (born 1991), Iranian footballer
- Yaser Karami (born 1992), Iranian football
- Yousef Karami (born 1983), Iranian Taekwondo athlete

== Other people ==
- Khalid Karami (born 1989), Dutch footballer of Moroccan origin
- Miyoko Karami (born 1974), Japanese road cyclist

== Language ==
- Karami language, an extinct and unclassified Papuan language, perhaps a language isolate, of Papua New Guinea.

== Places ==
- Rashid Karami Stadium, a Lebanese stadium named after prime minister Rashid Karami
- Ali Karami-ye Olya, also known as ‘Alī Karamī, a village in Chenar Rural District, Kabgian District, Dana County, Kohgiluyeh and Boyer-Ahmad Province, Iran
- Karreh Karami, a village in Tut-e Nadeh Rural District, in the Central District of Dana County, Kohgiluyeh and Boyer-Ahmad Province, Iran

== See also ==
- Karameh (disambiguation)
- Karamah (disambiguation)
- Karama (disambiguation)
- Karamat (disambiguation)
- Karam (disambiguation)
