= Karamat (disambiguation) =

Karamat in Sunni Islam refers to supernatural wonders performed by Muslim saints.

Karamat or Keramat (Arabic: کرامات, karāmāt, plural of کرامة, karāmah, 'generosity' or 'high-mindedness') may also refer to:

== People ==
=== Karamat ===
- Karamat Ali (disambiguation)
  - Karamat Ali (cricketer) (born 1996), Pakistani cricketer
  - Karamat Ali Jaunpuri (1800-1873), Islamic scholar
- Karamat Rahman Niazi, Pakistani admiral
- Jehangir Karamat (born 1941), Pakistani general and diplomat

=== Keramat ===
- Kazi Keramat Ali (born 1954), former Deputy Minister of Technical and Madrasah Education in Bangladesh
- Md. Keramat Ali (1901–1969), Bengali politician
- Mohammad Keramat Ali (1926–2004), Bangladeshi politician
- Keramat Daneshian (1944–1974), Iranian director, poet and communist activist
- Keramat Moula (born 1942), Bangladeshi theater activist and art director
- Keramat Ali Talukdar, Bangladeshi politician

== Places ==
- Keramat, Sulawesi, Indonesia
- Keramat (state constituency), Malaysia (1986–1995)
- Kampung Datuk Keramat, commonly Keramat, a zone in Titiwangsa constituency, Kuala Lumpur, Malaysia
- Lembah Keramat, Selangor, Malaysia
- Taman Keramat, Ulu Klang, Selangor, Malaysia

== Other uses ==
- Keramat, in Malay language, and kramat in South Africa, a mazar (mausoleum)

== See also ==
- Karamah (disambiguation)
- Karameh (disambiguation)
- Karam (disambiguation)
- Karamata (disambiguation)
- Karami, a surname
- Qarmatians
