= Qartaba =

Qartaba قرطبا
- Town
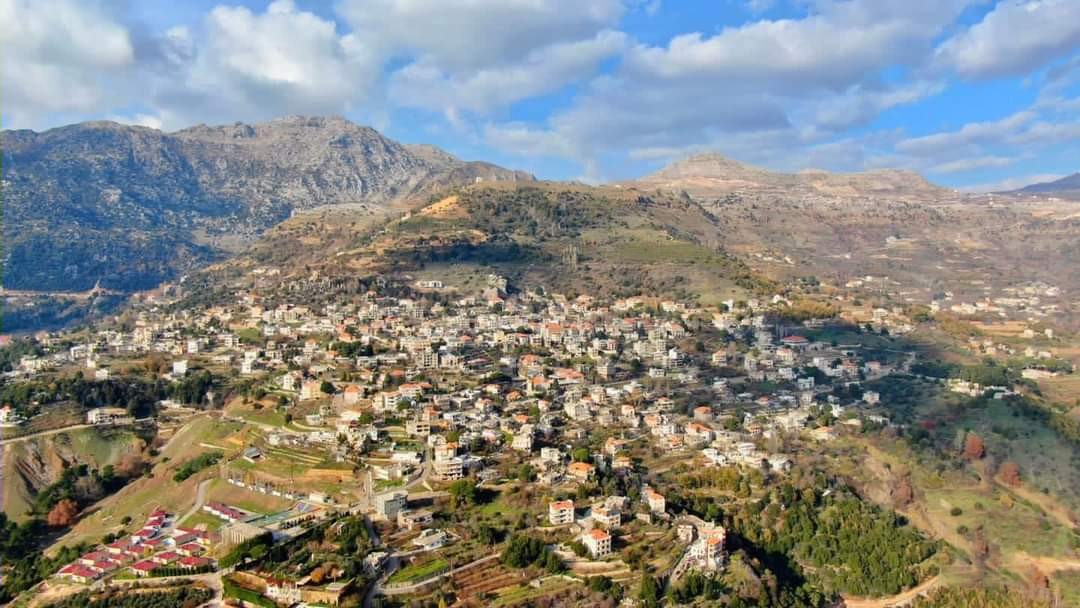
- Panoramic View of Qartaba
- Nicknames: Byblos' Bride, Capital of the Mountains, The Green Meadow
- Interactive map of Qartaba
- Location within Lebanon Location within the Eastern Mediterranean Location within the Middle East
- Coordinates: 34°06′N 35°51′E
- Country: Lebanon
- Governorate: Keserwan-Jbeil
- District: Byblos District

Government
  - Body: Municipal council
  - Mayor: Fadi Martinos

Area
  - Total: 8.5 km^{2} (3.3 sq mi)
- Elevation: 1,250 m (4,100 ft)
- Highest elevation: 1,800 m (5,900 ft)
- Lowest elevation: 800 m (2,600 ft)
- Demonym: Arabic: قرطباوي(ة)
- Time zone: UTC+2 (EET)
  - Summer (DST): UTC+3 (EEST)
- Postal code: 4455
- Dialing code: +961
- Website: Official webpage

Qartaba (Arabic: قرطبا, Syriac: ܩܪܛܒܐ, also spelled Kartaba or Artaba) is a town in the mountains of the Byblos District of the Keserwan-Jbeil Governorate, Lebanon. It is located 57 kilometers north Beirut on the mountains above Byblos at an average altitude of 1,250 meters. It is the second-most populous city in the district after Byblos.

Qartaba extends between the municipal borders of Almat el Jnoubiye to the northwest, Balhoss to the west, Qorqaiya to the southwest, Janne to the south, Deir Mar Sarkis to the east, and Mazraat es-Siyad to the northeast. It stands as one of the largest and most prominent towns in the Byblos District, renowned for its role as a premier resort and a major tourist destination. It offers a unique appeal with its dry, mild climate, making it an ideal spot for visitors year-round.

== Etymology ==
The name Qartaba has several interpretations:

- In Semitic languages, specifically Syriac, Qar (Syriac: ܩܪ, Arabic: قر) means settlement and Taba (Syriac: ܛܒܐ, Arabic: طبا) means good. Due to its good, curing and balanced weather.
- The name might be derived from Qartab, a plant that grows in its barren mountains.

The Syriac interpretation is the most likely because most of the surrounding villages have names of Syriac or Aramaic origin.

== History ==
=== 20th Century ===
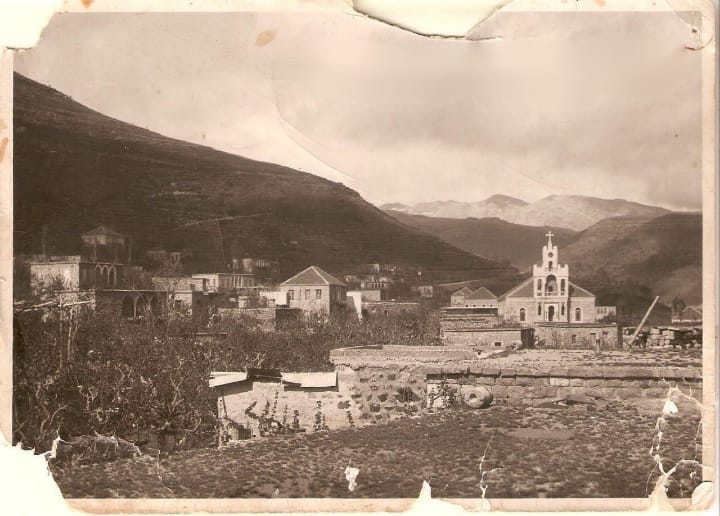
Qartaba in 1952

At the beginning of the 20th century, Qartaba was a significant commercial hub in the Byblos highland, attracting residents from neighboring villages for shopping and employment. Silk manufacturing flourished and in 1918 as the town boasted seven silk-spinning factories, employing around five hundred workers, and its residents raised silkworms for this industry. The silk produced was exported to Lyon, France. However, the industry declined with the advent of artificial silk.

In the mid-1950s, the people of Qartaba shifted their focus to agriculture, particularly apple farming, which remains prominent to this day. Olive groves, apple orchards and vineyards surround the town.

The diaspora of Qartaba's residents has spread worldwide, reaching countries such as Australia, Canada, the United States, Mexico, and notably South America, including Brazil, Venezuela and Argentina.

=== Archeology ===
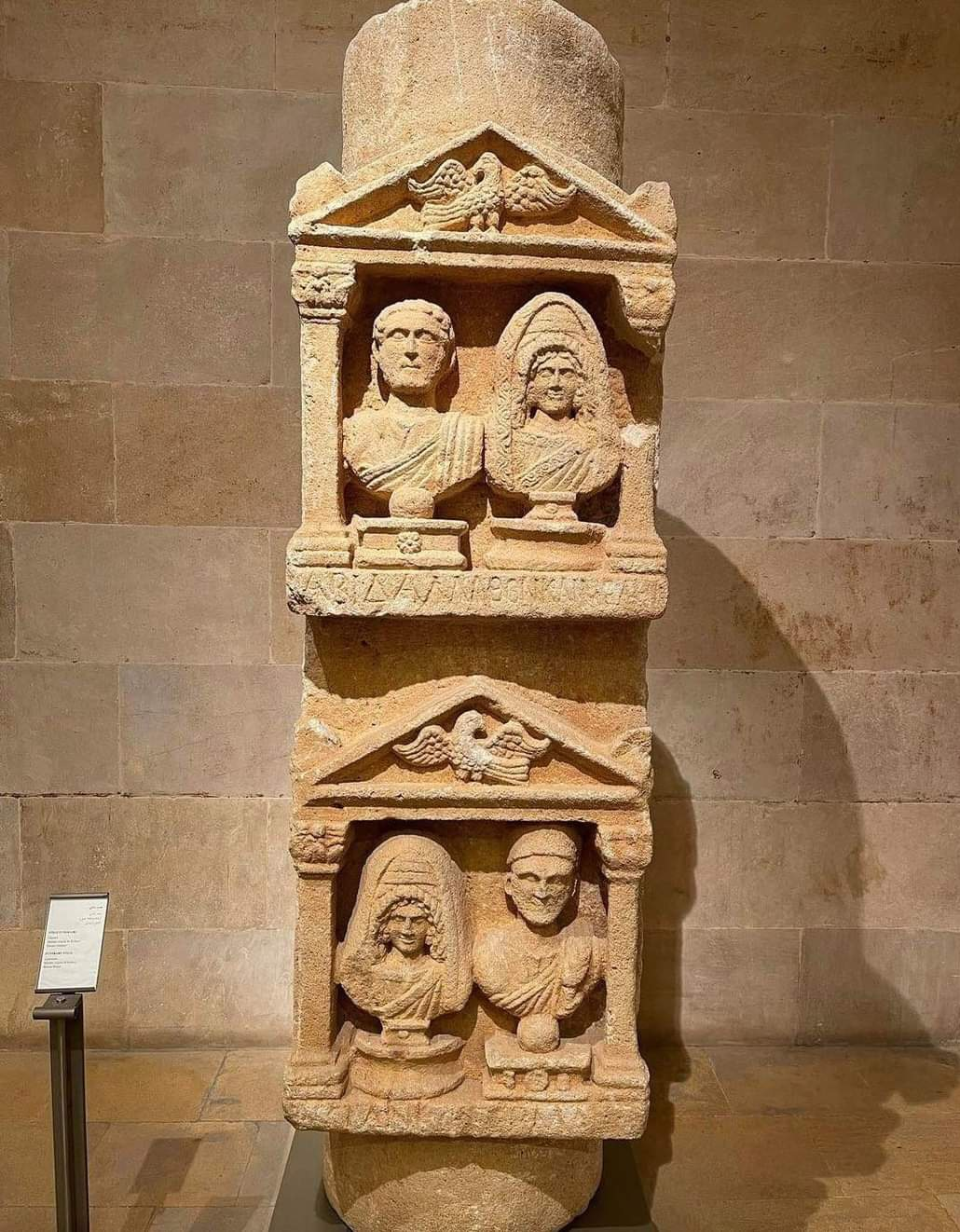
Qartaba Column

Funerary Qartaba Column

A column carved into the facade of two temples, with statues of members of an elite Roman family was discovered in 1940 in Qartaba, near Saint Sarkis and Bakhos Monastery. Written under the statues in Greek are the names of the family members: "Abd al-Latus", "Meli", "Cassia" and "Germanus". It is estimated that the statues were buried between 120 and 160 CE, based on Abd al-Latus' hair and beard (top left).

Men's clothing reflects the influence of Roman dress, unlike women's clothing, which reflects local tradition. "Germanus" (bottom right) appears to have been a priest, wearing the flat hat of a Phoenician priest, with a sprinkler in his hand for religious rituals. Germanus is still a family name present in Qartaba and is also used as a first name, particularly in Mazraat es-Siyad. As for "Abd al-Latus", he bears the name of a goddess whose honor was associated with the Arabian Peninsula, and the names "Germanus" and "Cassia" reflect the Roman influence in the area. The statue is now located in the National Museum of Beirut.

Saint Elias Historical Church

Saint Elias Church in Hsaiya, Qartaba, is a historically significant Maronite Church. Located approximately 500 meters from its original site, the current church was built to serve the local Maronite community. The old church, now in ruins, was constructed on the remains of an ancient temple, with only the foundation and massive, intricately carved stones still visible.

The structure was renovated in 1556 by Sheikh Aziz Al-Sokhni in dedication to Saint Elias, the patron saint of his ancestors. Today, the property belongs to the Maronite Patriarchate. Archaeological findings around the site include remnants of old houses with stones engraved with stars, crescent shapes, and serpents, potentially signifying ancient cultural or spiritual symbols.

West of the main structure, a Winepress and a large pressing vat carved into the rock are visible, along with a sarcophagus believed to contain multiple burial sites. These findings, alongside the architectural style, suggest that the site may have Phoenician origins.

Roman Inscriptions

Qartaba, a region rich in ancient inscriptions, lies in a landscape where numerous Roman engravings, especially those attributed to the era of Emperor Hadrian, have been found. These inscriptions are mostly located on large rocks and cliffs in the mountainous surroundings of Qartaba and nearby valleys. While the town may lack grand ancient monuments, the Hadrianic inscriptions scattered across its surroundings offer valuable insight into the Roman influence in the area, making it a point of interest for historians and archeologists alike.

Key Inscriptions Around Qartaba:

- Ras Akbet-Janne: Located southwest of Qartaba, this inscription is found on a large rock. Although partially legible, it likely includes the standard formula "MAI AVG" and the abbreviation "DFS."
- Rock Facing Nahr Ibrahim: Near the previous inscription, another engraving faces the Nahr Ibrahim River. While some letters are smaller or larger than others, it appears to include the sequence "[A]GIVCP."
- Wadi Botrayich: In this valley in Qartaba, an inscription was found on a stone likely dislodged from the cliff. It reads “AGIVCP.”
- Jouar el-Ramel: This inscription, located between Balhoss and Qartaba, includes the sequences “MPHADAVGDFS” and “AGIVCP.”
- Ammes Bou-Yazbek (also known as Ammes Sagheer): In the Tarou' area, inscriptions appear on opposite sides of a large rock, with one side reading “MPIADAV” and the other “AGIVCP.”
- Ammas Beit Challita and Ammas Bou-Yazbek: Another poorly preserved inscription with the same pattern, “MPIADAVGDFS” and “AGIVCP", was found here, south of Qartaba.
- Ammas al-Kabir: This location, overlooking the Tarou’ al-Ward, features two inscriptions: one reading “AGIV CVCP” or “CVGP", and another “MPIAD AVG D.”
- Tarou’ al-Ward: close to Jouar el-Ramel, another inscription was copied, though roughly, indicating the letters “AVG CV.”

The inscriptions around Qartaba are often partially eroded or concealed, making them challenging to locate without the assistance of local guides. Many of these inscriptions are located in remote and elevated areas, accessible only with the help of knowledgeable locals familiar with the terrain.

Via Appia

The Eastern Via Appia, an extension of the Roman road network, is believed to have passed through Qartaba, specifically the Botrayich area, and through multiple towns in the Byblos District, like Byblos, Yanouh, Aaqoura, all the way to the Temple of Bacchus in Baalbek. This site contains ancient Roman inscriptions and a variety of ruins, including remnants from Roman, Greek, and Crusader periods.

== Geography ==
=== Climate ===
Qartaba has a Mediterranean climate with very low humidity, creating a fresh and inviting atmosphere and making it a refuge for those with asthma and allergies. Summers are hot and dry, with temperatures reaching up to 33 °C (91 °F) and nearly no rainfall. Clear skies dominate, and sunshine hours peak at 14.5 hours a day. In autumn, temperatures gradually cool, and rainfall increases slightly, with November receiving around 62 mm (2.45 inches).

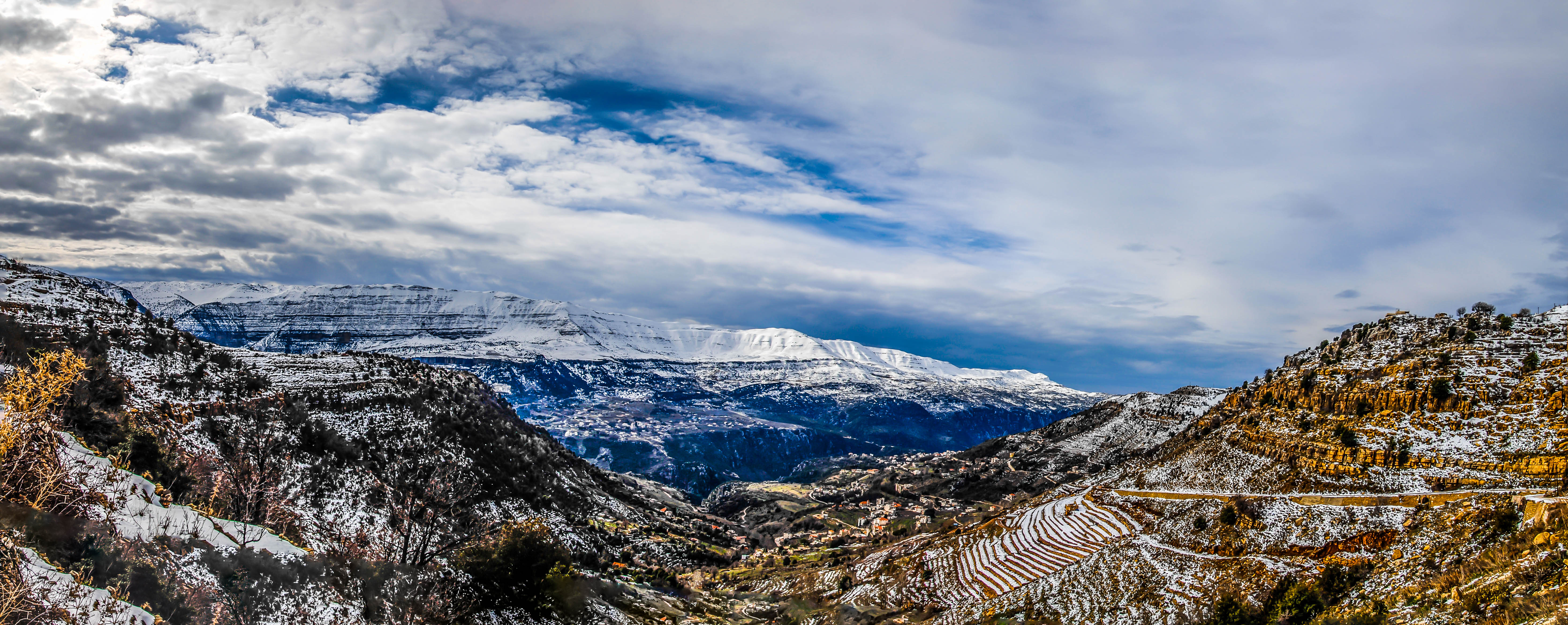

Winter is cold and snowy, with average highs around 11 °C (52 °F) and lows near freezing. January is the wettest month, bringing about 140 mm (5.53 inches) of precipitation. Snow often blankets the village, adding a serene charm. Spring brings mild warmth and moderate rain, nurturing lush greenery and vibrant blooms before the return of dry summer months.

Climate data for Qartaba
Month	Jan	Feb	Mar	Apr	May	Jun	Jul	Aug	Sep	Oct	Nov	Dec	Year
Mean daily maximum °C (°F)	11 (52)	13 (55)	16 (61)	21 (70)	27 (81)	30 (86)	33 (91)	33 (91)	31 (88)	26 (79)	19 (66)	13 (55)	23 (73)
Mean daily minimum °C (°F)	1 (34)	2 (36)	4 (39)	8 (46)	12 (54)	15 (59)	17 (63)	17 (63)	15 (59)	11 (52)	6 (43)	3 (37)	9 (49)
Average precipitation mm (inches)	140.5 (5.53)	130.8 (5.15)	74.4 (2.93)	34.3 (1.35)	8.9 (0.35)	0.1 (0.00)	0.3 (0.01)	0.1 (0.00)	3.4 (0.13)	17.2 (0.68)	62.2 (2.45)	111.8 (4.40)	584 (22.98)
Mean daily sunshine hours	10	11	12	13	14	14.5	14	13.5	12.5	11.5	10.5	10	12.2
Source: https://www.noaa.gov/

=== Nature ===
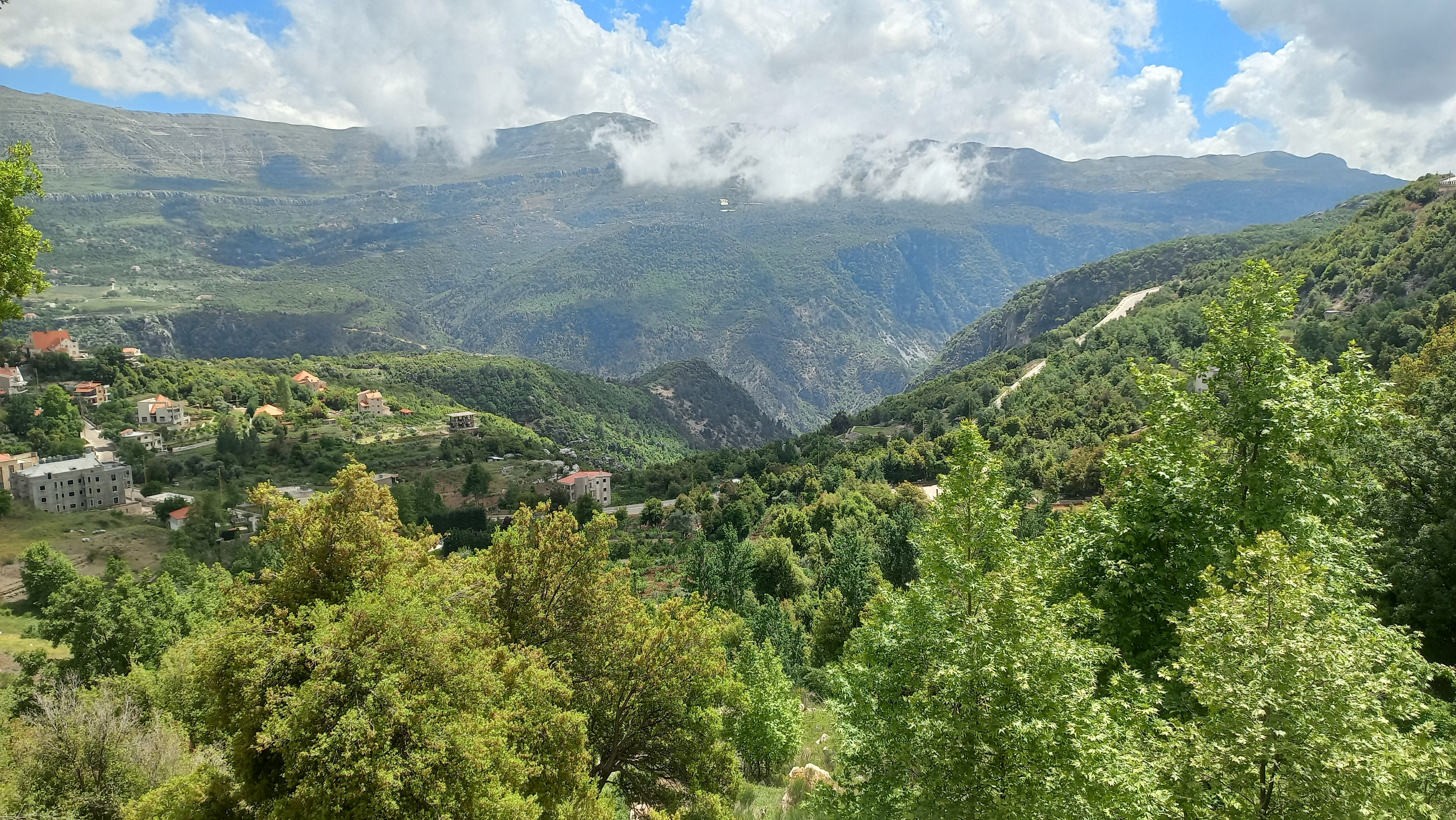
Qartaba in the spring

The forests and green spaces of Qartaba make up about 70% of the town's area, a significant expanse that includes many tree species. These trees range from oak and sycamore to wild mulberry and the rare Lebanese pine, which was commonly used in the past to build houses with earthen roofs.

=== Geology ===
Tellejet Qartaba (Arabic: ثلاجات قرطبا), translating to "Qartaba's freezers", are huge karst rock formations located in the town's Barren mountains at an altitude of 1600 meters above sea level. These formations are characterized by their impressive size and unique shapes, resulting from natural Erosion processes over millions of years. They were given this name due to their ability to store snow all year round.

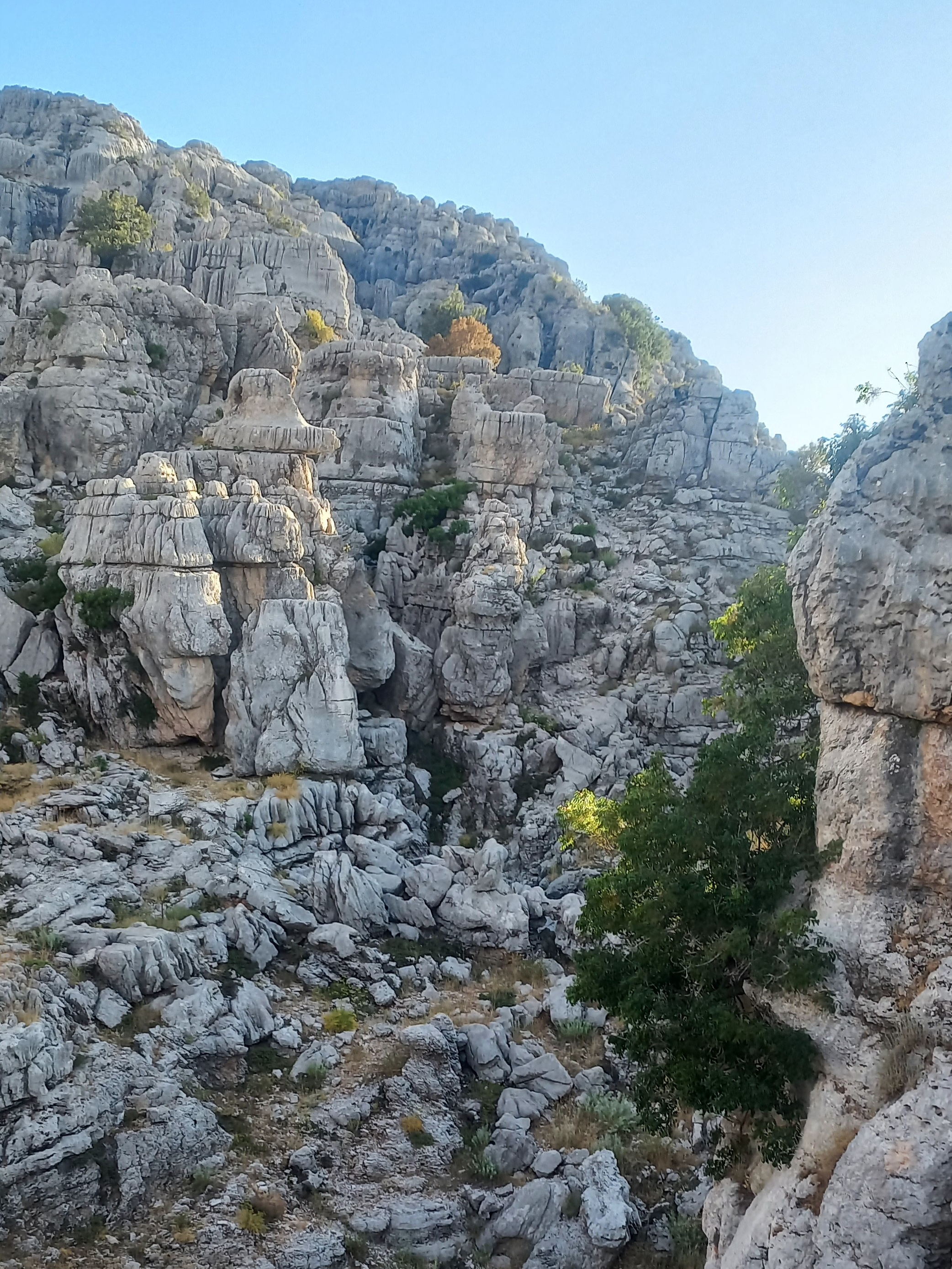
Tellejet Qartaba

The geological composition of the rocks is primarily Limestone, which is typical of the region and contributes to their distinctive appearance. The formations showcase various erosion patterns, creating cliffs and crevices. The area overlooks the surrounding landscape, making it a common spot for hikers, rock climbers and nature enthusiasts.

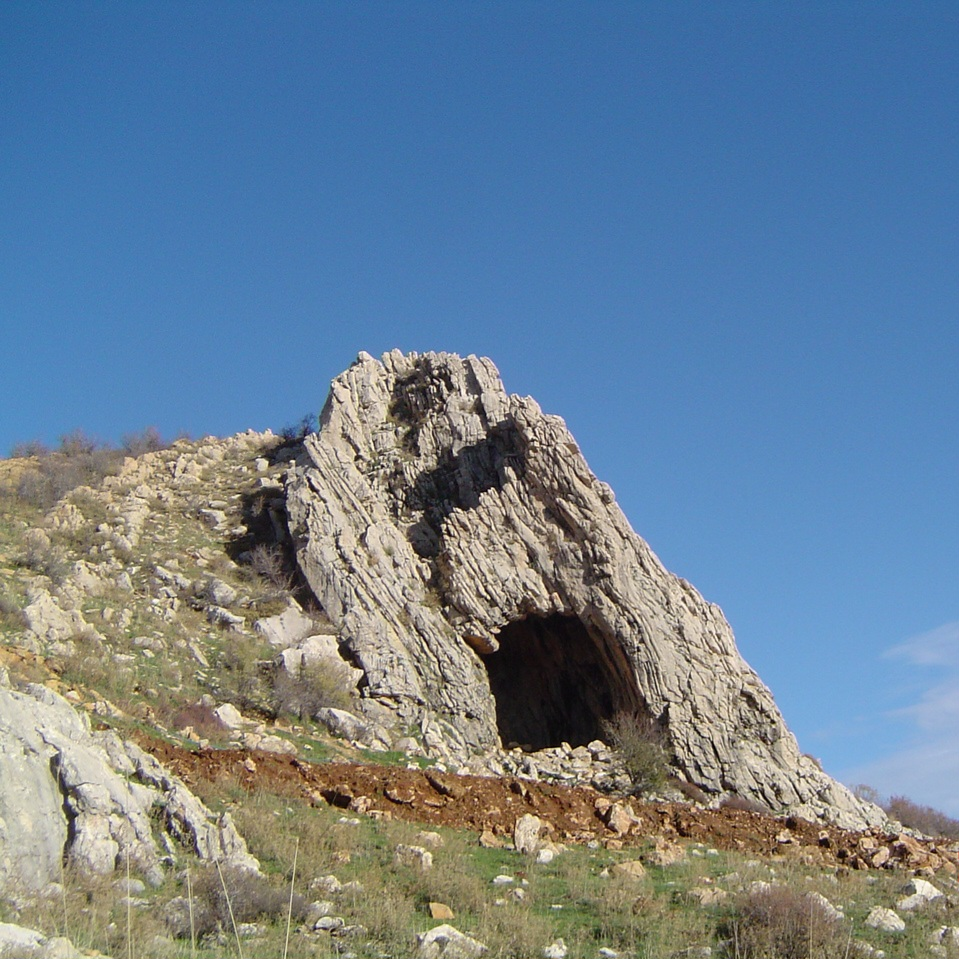
Al Matkoube Cave

Matkoube Cave (Arabic: مغارة المثقوبة) is a natural cave located in the highlands of the town, standing 1690 meters above sea level. Its name reflects its feature, as there is a large hole about 15 meters high in its ceiling. The snow that falls inside lasts for a long time, extending until the summer season, which the locals used to benefit from in the past. Currently, the cave attracts rock climbing and hiking enthusiasts and is occasionally used to shelter livestock.

== Demographics ==
Qartaba is the second most populous town in the Byblos District. The town experiences seasonal population fluctuations, becoming more densely populated in summer as residents return and visitors arrive, while winter sees a decrease in density as many relocate to urban areas or lower elevations. This seasonal variation highlights Qartaba's dynamic demographic profile and its appeal as a summer destination.

Historical population
Year	Pop.	±%
2010	6,129	—
2014	6,212	+1.4%
2018	6,357	+2.3%
2022	6,436	+1.2%
Population of registered voters in Qartaba (over 21 y/o)

The biggest families in Qartaba are: Sokhn, Karam, Khoury, Challita, Beyrouthy, Sakr, Atallah, Salem, Cherfan, and Lahoud.

=== Religion ===
In 2014, Christians made up 98.89% of registered voters in Qartaba. 90.07% of the voters were Maronite Catholics.

== Economy ==
=== Agriculture ===
Agriculture in Qartaba has gone through several phases, each characterized by its own distinct agricultural season. Qartaba was historically known for grape cultivation, as the Phoenicians were recognized for their process of pressing grapes grown in the Byblos region. In the 19th century, Qartaba shifted to cultivating mulberries and raising silkworms for silk production.

By the 1940s, the focus of agriculture had turned to apples, which gained widespread fame in the Byblos District. Over 250,000 red apple trees, known for their deep color due to the fog that occurs during the final growth stage, spread throughout Qartaba. Additionally, peaches, cherries, pears, and other fruits are also cultivated and exported.

=== Tourism ===
Qartaba is a destination in Lebanon, known for its religious heritage, particularly its numerous churches. This has made it a significant spot for religious tourism, attracting visitors interested in exploring its historical and spiritual sites.

The town mostly relies on tourism for its economy, making the hospitality sector crucial to its sustainability. Qartaba has a number of hotels, rental apartments, and guest houses. There are also several local restaurants, which offer a taste of local dishes. Some visitors choose to stay in Qartaba while venturing out to nearby attractions, such as the neighbouring villages of Laqlouq and Aqoura, or the Afqa Cave.

== Government and politics ==
=== Municipality ===
Qartaba Municipality, established in 1894, is a local administrative division in the Byblos District of Lebanon. It is known for its historical significance and active community involvement in local governance.

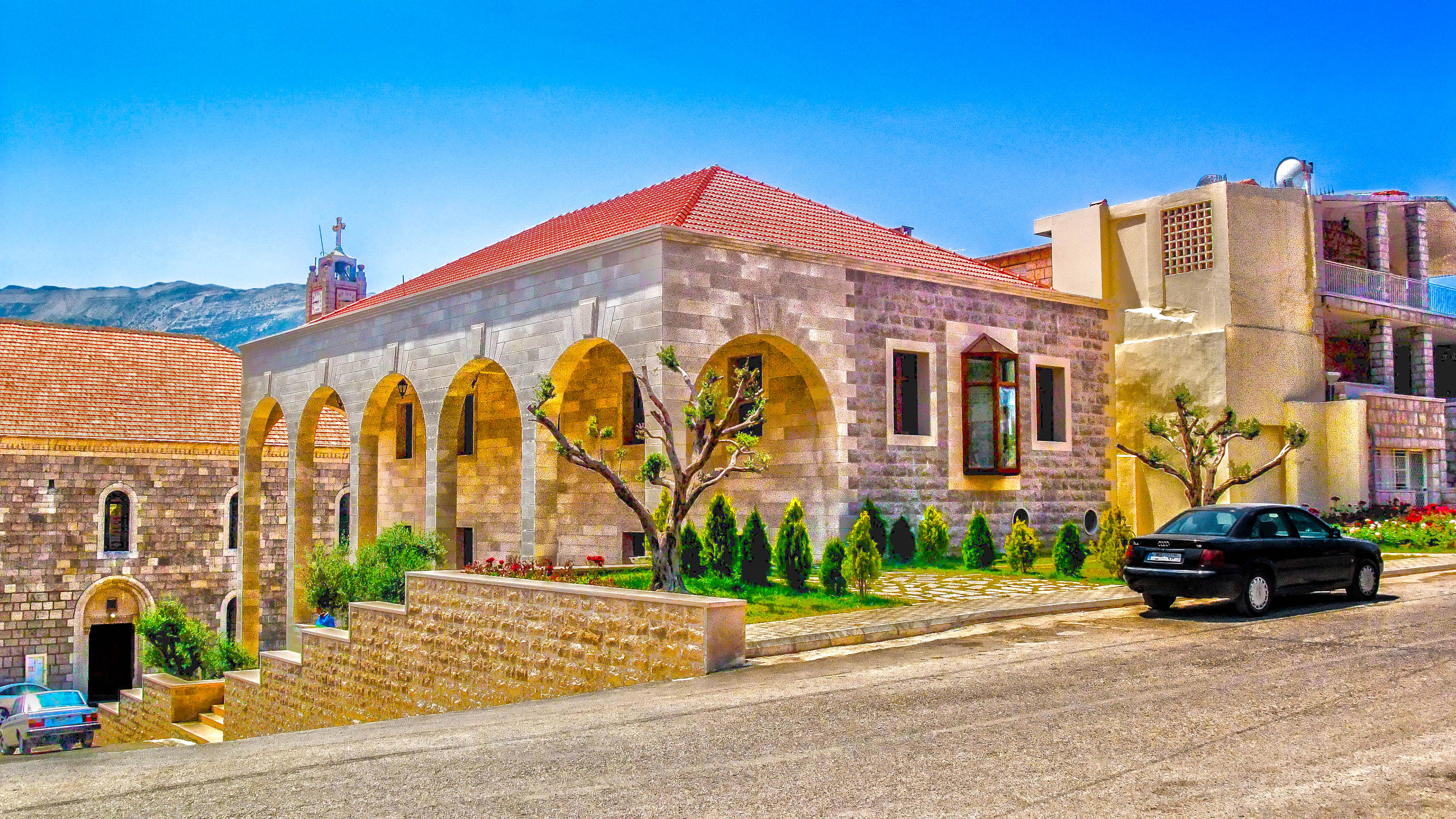
Qartaba Municipality

The most recent municipal elections were held on 4 May 2025. Unlike the previous election in 2016, which was uncontested and resulted in the acclamation of the council, the 2025 elections featured a competitive race between two electoral lists. The list Qartaba Btestehal, led by incumbent mayor Fadi Martinos, won the election with 1,814 votes. The list was supported by the Lebanese Forces, the Free Patriotic Movement, and the Kataeb Party. The opposing list, Kartaba 2040, ran as an independent slate backed by Fares Souaid. While the list had no formal leader, its highest-polling candidate Nader Karam received 1,300 votes. Around 3,300 residents participated in the election.

=== Parliamentary Elections ===
In the most recent parliamentary general elections held on May 15, 2022, in Qartaba, a total of 3,369 voters participated, resulting in a turnout of 52.3%. This marked a slight decrease from the 3,452 voters and 54.3% turnout in the 2018 elections.

Fares Souaid (Indep. Candidate) emerged as the leading candidate, securing 1,229 votes, which accounted for 36.47% of the total votes. Ziad Hawat (LF Candidate) followed with 549 votes (16.29%), while Simon Abi Ramia (FPM Candidate) garnered 414 votes (12.28%). These three candidates were the most favored among the electorate, reflecting the political preferences in Qartaba.

1. Fares Souaid (36.5%)
2. Ziad Hawat (16.3%)
3. Simon Abi Ramia (12.3%)
4. Nawfal Nawfal (7.12%)
5. Najwa Bassil (5.16%)
6. Walid el Khoury (4.33%)
7. Amir Mokdad (2.28%)
8. Emile Nawfal (2.04%)
9. Others (12) (10.4%)
10. Blank Papers (3.62%)

Ultimately, both Ziad Hawat and Simon Abi Ramia were elected to Parliament as representatives of the Byblos District.

Around 8.7% of the total votes in Qartaba came from the diaspora, mostly from France (24%), Canada (16.4%), the United Arab Emirates (13%), the United States (12.5%), and Qatar (4.3%).

Election Year	Number of Voters in Qartaba	Turnout (%)
2022	3369	52.3
2018	3452	54.3
2009	3557	58.2

=== Mukhtars ===
In Qartaba, six elected Mukhtars represent the community, providing strong local governance and facilitating effective communication between residents and municipal authorities. The results of the 2025 election are as follows:

	Mukhtars' Name	Number of Votes
Northern Qartaba	Elie Antoine Saad	936
Northern Qartaba	Samir Youssef Sakr	560
Northern Qartaba	Elie Jamil Merhej	320
Southern Qartaba	Elias Georges el Khoury	571
Southern Qartaba	André Antoine Francis	524
Southern Qartaba	Georges Karam Karam	404

== Culture ==
=== Festivals ===
Kartaba Carnival

Kartaba Carnival (Arabic: كرنفال قرطبا) is an annual and cherished event organized usually mid-August to early-September by the "Qartaba Touristic and Traditional Festivals" committee with support from the Municipality. It attracts a diverse array of attendees, including political, military, judicial, and religious figures, as well as social media influencers, municipal presidents, and notable personalities from Qartaba and the Byblos District.

The carnival, which began in the 1960s, continues to be held in the village square, drawing visitors from all regions. The local community, comprising people of all ages, comes together to create exhibition boards showcasing traditional Lebanese music, art and culture. This event is free to attend and concludes with a musical evening featuring performances by Lebanese artists.

Kartaba Festival

Kartaba Festival (Arabic: مهرجانات قرطبا) is an annual music festival held each September in Qartaba. Organized by Kartaba Club, the festival features prominent Lebanese artists, such as Melhem Barakat, Georges Wassouf, Wael Kfoury, Ragheb Alama, and Najwa Karam. The event not only showcases the rich musical heritage of Lebanon but also significantly boosts tourism in the region, attracting visitors and creating a vibrant atmosphere filled with performances and cultural experiences.

Religious Festivities

Qartaba, a town known for its Maronite Christian heritage, hosts several significant religious festivities. Key celebrations include the Feast of the Cross, the Assumption of Mary, the Feast of Saint Challita, and the Feast of Saint Elias. These events typically feature masses followed by gatherings in the church square, where residents enjoy food, music, and dancing. These festivities reflect the vibrant community spirit and traditions of the Maronite Christian community in Qartaba.

=== Architecture ===
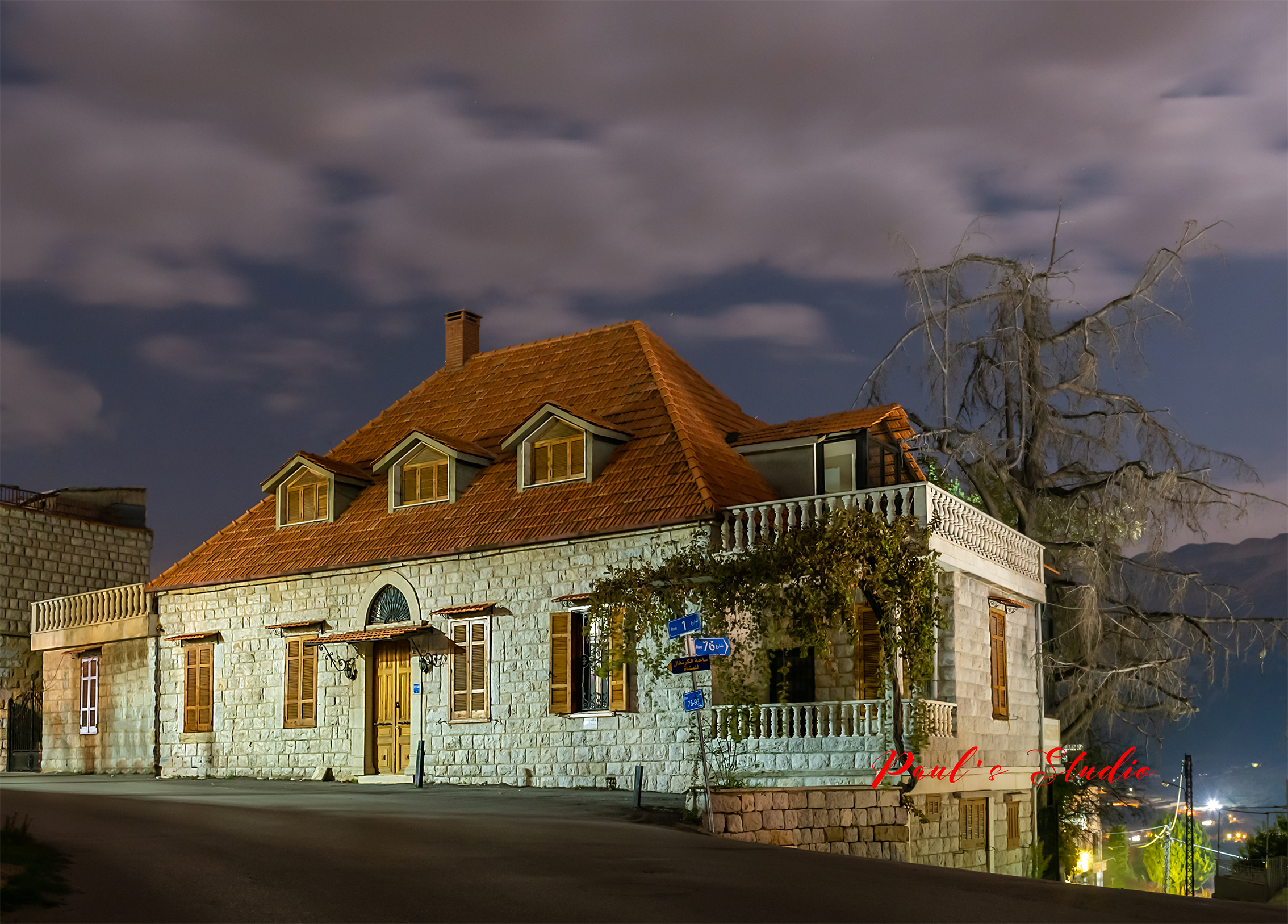

Qartaba's architectural landscape is dominated by traditional Lebanese houses. These homes typically feature stone walls, high arched windows, and terracotta-tiled, red sloping roofs. Many of these structures are constructed with local limestone, which not only lends a natural, earthy hue to the exteriors but also provides thermal insulation suited to Lebanon’s climate. Balconies with ornate ironwork, vaulted ceilings, and large arched doors are common elements, contributing to an open and welcoming atmosphere. The interiors often include high ceilings and thick walls, designed to regulate temperature, creating cool spaces during the summer and warmth in the winter.

=== Sports ===
Kartaba Club

Kartaba Club is one of the largest cultural and sports clubs in the Byblos region, established in 1965 by Mr. Jamil Saab, then president of the charity association of Kartaba (ABK).

Spanning over 65,000 square meters, the club features a large building with a hall for meetings and presentations that can also serve as a theater. Its facilities include a Basketball court, a Football field, Table Tennis tables, a stage that accommodates up to 4000 people and a small garden for children.

The club is dedicated to reviving cultural, sports, and tourism activities in the region, regularly hosting workshops, concerts, and festivals that celebrate local heritage. Additionally, it organizes outdoor activities such as hiking and nature walks, promoting family participation and fostering a sense of belonging and shared identity within the local community. Notably, Kartaba Club hosts tournaments in football, basketball, and table tennis, featuring competitions between Qartaba's teams and teams from nearby villages, enhancing regional camaraderie and sportsmanship.

=== Associations ===
Qartaba has many charities, associations and foundations, some of the most influential ones being:

- Association de Bienfaisance de Kartaba (ABK) (Arabic: الجمعيّة الخيّرية القرطباويّة), established in 1927, is one of the first charitable societies in Lebanon that still exists, and that practices and supports Qartaba's society in various fields (medical, health, educational and social).
- Brotherhood of the Heart of Jesus
- Brotherhood of the Immaculate Conception

== Religious sites ==
Qartaba is a village rich in Maronite heritage, home to ancient churches, monasteries, and cathedrals that highlight its deep religious roots. Some of the most important ones being:

=== Monasteries ===
Saint Sarkis and Bakhos Monastery (Arabic: دير مار سركيس و باخوس) was built in 1536 when the children of Sheikh Gerges fled from Aqoura to Qartaba, bringing with them an image of the holy martyrs, Saints Sergius and Bacchus. With the help of the townspeople, they built a Church dedicated to these Saints, which was later destroyed by fire and rebuilt in 1718. In 1815, the people of Qartaba gifted the Church and its property as an "eternal endowment" to the Lebanese Maronite Order. This endowment was intended to establish a school to provide free education in reading, Christian teachings, guidance, and spiritual services. This agreement was made with General Father Ignatius Blebel and approved by Bishop Germanos Tabet. The Order promptly completed the school and purchased adjacent lands to expand the construction, eventually establishing the site as a legal Monastery in 1823.

The monks continued to serve the people of Qartaba according to monastic values. Two of these fathers are well-known: Father Daniel Al-Alam Al-Hadathi (1889) and Youssef Abi Ghosn el Jbeily (1934) who died a pious and virtuous death. It once housed the third-largest number of monks among all monasteries in Lebanon, surpassed only by those in Tannourine and Beit Chabab. Additionally, it is the only Maronite monastery in the Jebbet el Mnaitra region and is home to Lebanon's oldest church bell, dating back to 1820.

=== Cathedrals ===
Cathedral of Saint Elias, originally constructed in the mid-16th century and restored in 1556, underwent two major rebuilds in 1846 and 1903. Designed following a basilical plan, the cathedral features three naves and three altars. It houses numerous 19th century paintings by Kanan Dib and Daoud Corm, and is adorned with stained glass windows. The exterior is highlighted by a bell tower with a clock, adding to its architectural splendor.

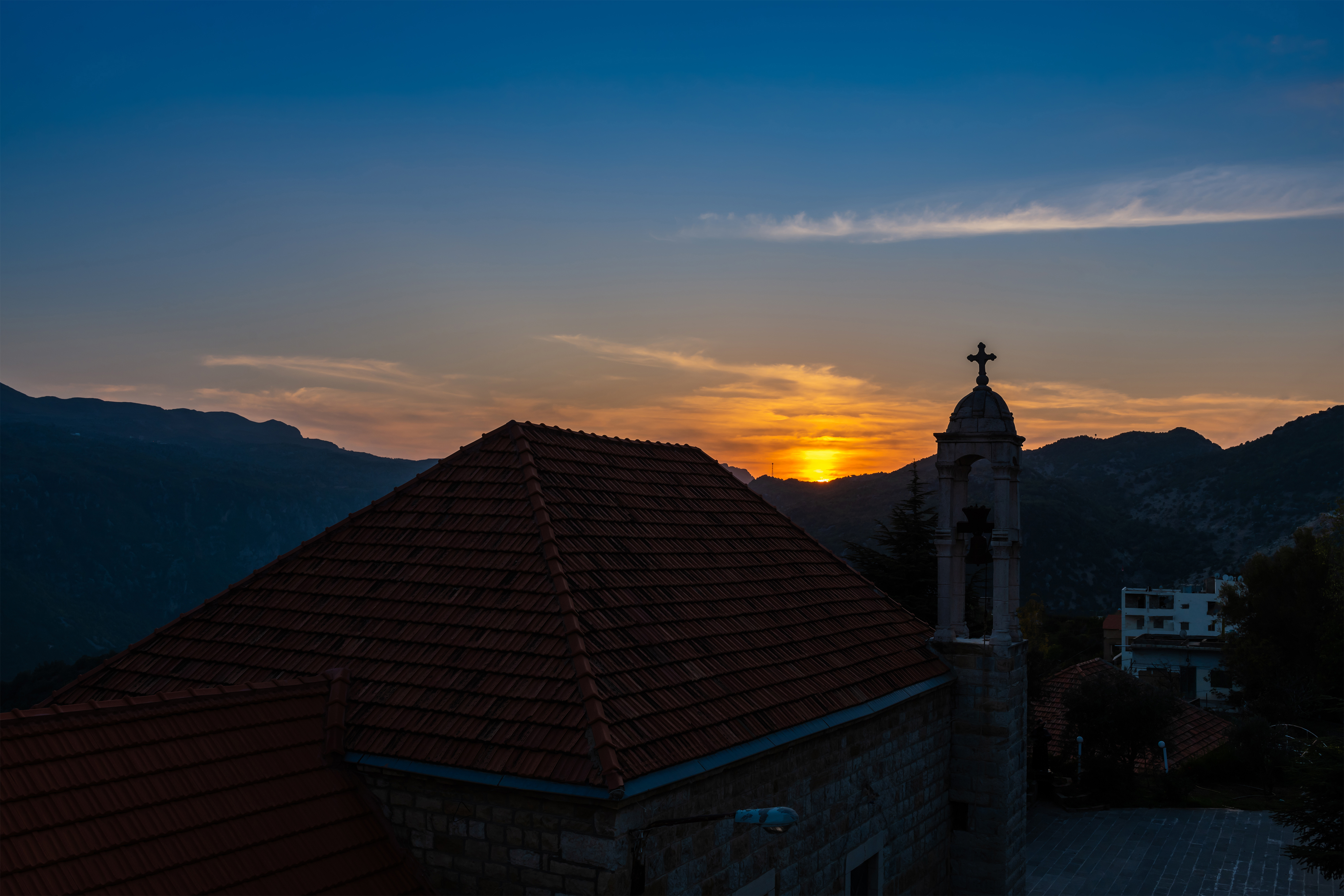
Saint Joseph's Church

=== Churches ===
- Church of Our Lady of Herezmaniye (Arabic: كنيسة سيدة الحرزمانية) was built in 1827 when the Karam family relocated from Yanouh to Qartaba. They reached an agreement with the Hamade sheikhs to construct the Church on the herezmeny land, which housed Roman ruins. A vault was then added to the main building, giving the church an L-shape. The name Herezmaniye comes from the type of soil Herezman (Arabic: حرزمان) that surrounds the area near the Church.
- Church of Saint Tedy was built in 1607 when the family of the priest Tedy came to Qartaba from Urfa. It was built upon a parcel of land that was donated by the Hamade sheikhs. It is the only church in Lebanon dedicated to Saint Tedy or Jude the Apostle of Asia Minor. The other churches in Lebanon are usually dedicated to him under the name of apostle Leba. The church was rebuilt in 1868 and has a painting by Daoud Corm dating back to 1880 representing Saint Tedy as a bishop. The church was restored in 2004.
- Church of Saint Joseph was built in 1898 when Joseph Rafael Jabbour gave the land of Al Malaha to build it.
- Church of Saint George was built as a private chapel for the family of Moufarrej Geryes in the late 19th century and was restored in 2022, it is located in Haret El Tahta street.

And many other churches, private chapels, and shrines, dedicated to Saint Abda, Saint Anthony of Padua, Saint Challita, Saint Charbel, Saint Don Bosco, Saint Elias, Our Lady of the Annunciation, Our Lady of Peace, Our Lady of Tenderness, Saint Rita, Saint Simeon Stylites, Saint Thérèse and Saint Veronica Giuliani, making it a total of 17 churches in the village.

== Infrastructure ==
=== Road Network ===
Qartaba's Main Road Development

The Beir El Heet-Qartaba road project, completed in 2022, transformed a formerly narrow and hazardous road into a safe, modern route constructed to international standards. The project, launched in 2018, improved the main access road to Qartaba, addressing long-standing safety concerns. Previously known as the "Road of Death" due to its narrowness and lack of protective features, the route was challenging and often avoided by drivers.

The redeveloped road now stretches 7.6 km from the town of Aalamat, passing through Balhoss, and continues to the end of Qartaba. It varies in width from 9 to 12 meters and includes a 3-meter-wide pedestrian sidewalk extending from Qartaba's entrance near the solar clock to the Ain El Barde Bridge by Saint Simon's Church. The project was funded through an agreement between the Lebanese government, represented by the Ministry of Public Works and Transport, and was approved by the Cabinet in early 2017. The road was then named after Mayyas following their huge international success in 2022.

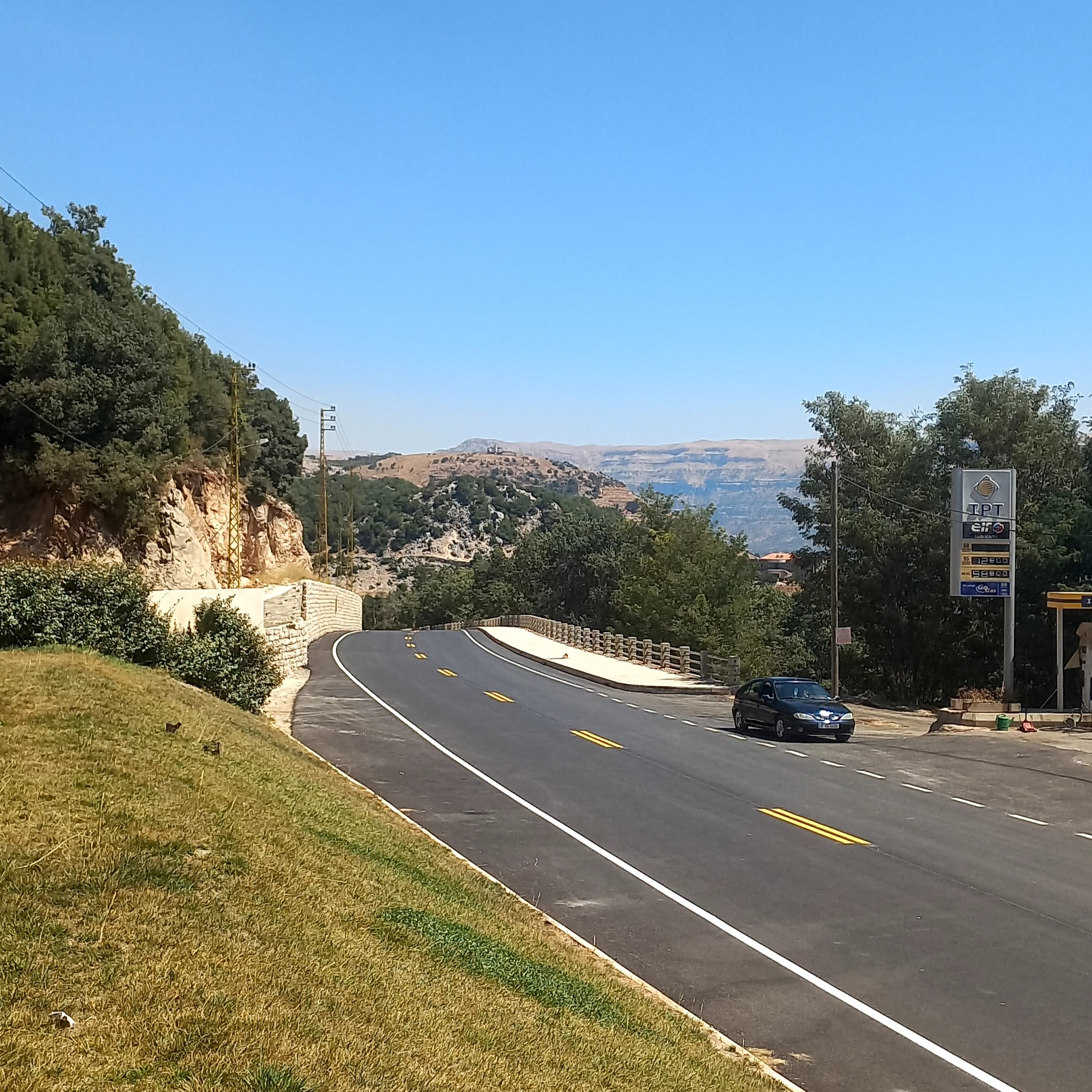
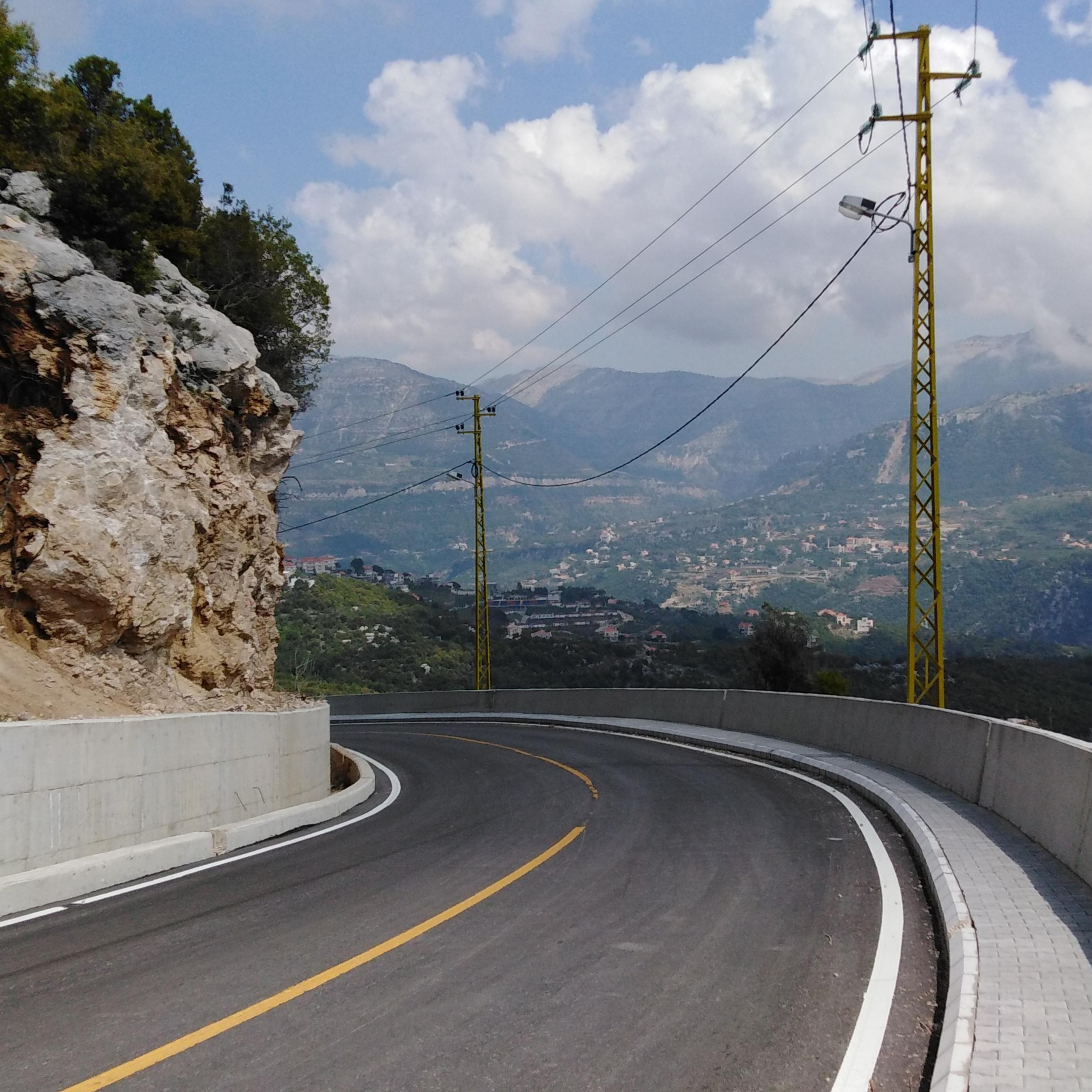
Qartaba's Main Road and Hjarta Road

Hjarta Road Development

The development of Hjarta Road, linking the entrance of Qartaba with the Hjarta area, was initiated by the Ministry of Public Works and Transport at the end of 2015 and completed in late 2019. Originally planned as a one-year project, the 2.2 km road faced delays but ultimately included extensive infrastructure upgrades. These enhancements involved paving, retaining walls, drainage systems, and installations for water, electricity, and street lighting. Expanded to a width of 10 meters with sidewalks, Hjarta Road now offers an alternative route, alleviating congestion on the main Qartaba road and improving connectivity for local residents and visitors accessing nearby areas. The road was then inaugurated in honor of the five Qartaba Martyrs of the 4th of August Beirut explosion.

=== Public Transportation ===
Qartaba's public transportation includes two primary buses, Bybus Transportations and ABK, serving as essential links between Qartaba and neighboring areas. These buses operate daily routes that start in Qartaba, pass through nearby towns, and continue to Nahr Ibrahim and Byblos. The town's two bus stops are conveniently located in the main square and near Our Lady of Herezmaniye Church, allowing easy access for residents, students, and commuters alike. These routes provide reliable transportation for locals and visitors, facilitating access to educational, commercial, and cultural centers in the area. This system, though modest, plays a vital role in maintaining Qartaba's connectivity with its surrounding communities.

=== Public Safety ===
Qartaba’s infrastructure supports the community with several key facilities. The Civil Defense Center acts as the local fire department, staffed by volunteers who respond to fire incidents and other emergencies in the area. The town also has an Internal Security Forces Center and a police department to maintain public order and address local security needs. In 2018, there were discussions about constructing a larger fire department in Jouar el Ramel, directly across from the police department, to enhance emergency response, but the project was canceled due to the economic crisis in 2019.

During winter, a dedicated snow removal service operates to clear roads in Qartaba and neighboring villages, ensuring that transport and access remain possible despite heavy snowfall. Additionally, the Qartaba Governmental Public hospital, the only hospital in the mountainous areas of the Byblos District, is a crucial healthcare resource for residents. However, it functions with limited resources, presenting challenges in fully meeting the medical needs of the local population.

=== Janna Dam ===
The Janna Dam, constructed in the village of Janne, situated just below Qartaba and approximately 30 kilometers northeast of Beirut, is designed as a massive arch gravity dam intended to store 38 million cubic meters of water. The project aims to provide essential water supplies to the regions of Byblos, Beirut, and its suburbs, addressing chronic water shortages in these areas.

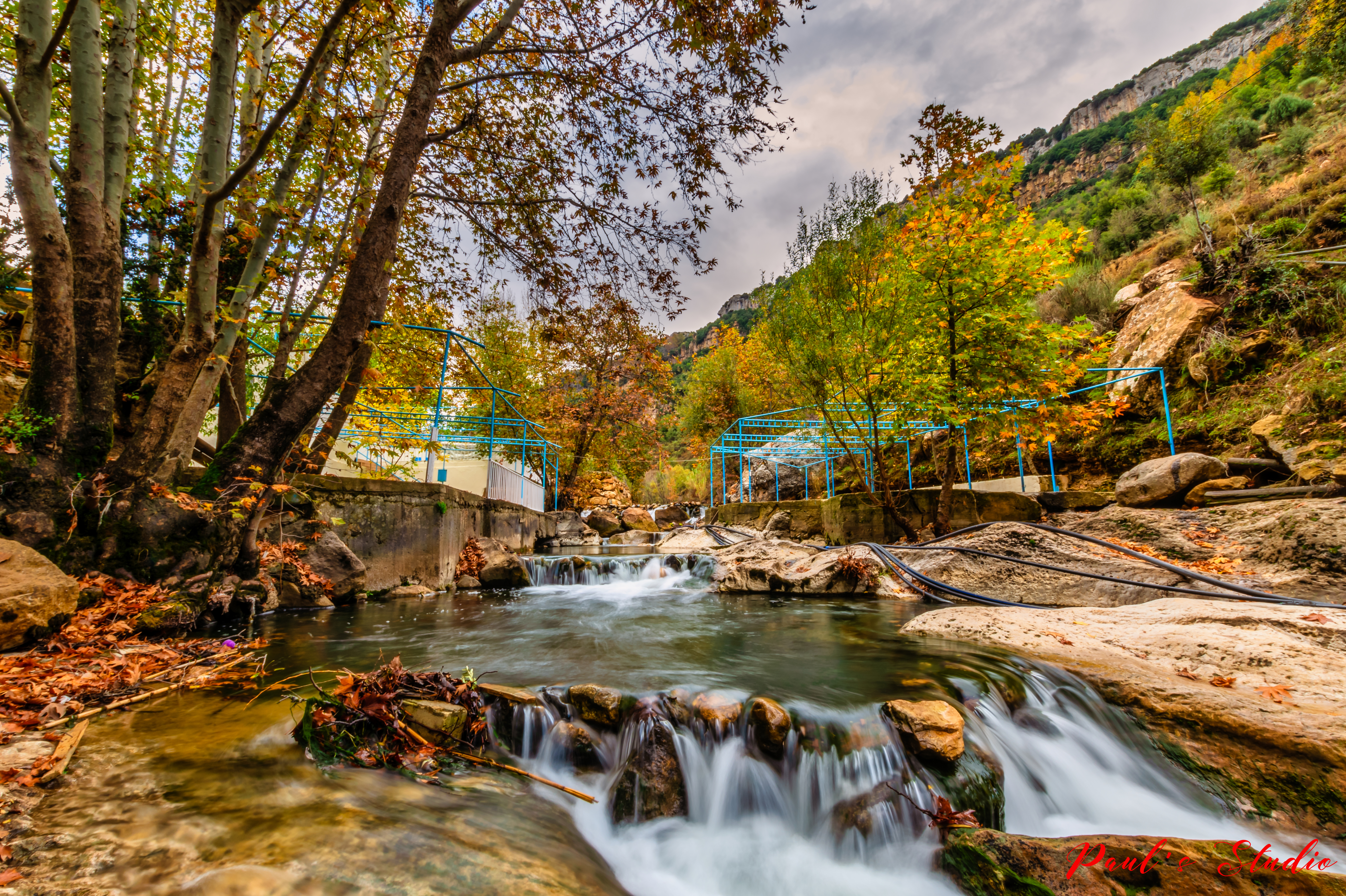
Janne river

Despite its intended benefits, the Janna Dam project has faced significant opposition due to environmental concerns. In 2016, experts warned of potential biodiversity loss and geological risks associated with the construction. The Lebanese Ministry of Energy and Water continued with the project, prompting widespread criticism.

Concerns included severe environmental destruction, with predictions of catastrophic outcomes for local ecosystmes and habitat loss for species such as wolves and hyenas. Environmentalist Roland Riachi emphasized that the dam would disrupt the entire ecosystem, leading to erosion and loss of biodiversity. Reports indicated that thousands of trees were cut down, with estimates suggesting up to 300,000, threatening the nearby UNESCO-recognized Jabal Moussa Biosphere Reserve.

Despite the Ministry's claims that only 5,000 trees had been removed, a civil engineering study revealed irreversible ecological damages and recommended immediate biodiversity surveys, which were conducted only after construction had commenced. Additionally, concerns arose regarding the dam's effectiveness due to the porous karst geological foundation of the region, which could impede water storage, alongside inadequate consideration of seasonal water flow variations.

Initially budgeted at approximately $300 million, the project's costs were projected to rise to nearly $1 billion when accounting for land acquisitions and maintenance. However, after the economic crisis in Lebanon in 2019, construction on the Janna Dam was halted completely. As of 2024, the project has resulted only in the destruction of what was once the village of Janne. What was intended as a development initiative to provide water and electricity has instead caused significant ecological damage to Janne, Qartaba, and the region.

== Education ==
There are two schools in Qartaba:

- Don Bosco Primary School, the first school established by the Salesian Sisters of Don Bosco in Lebanon.
- El Saydeh School, which was a private school run by the Sisters of Aabrine and then turned into a mixed public high school.

== Notable people ==
- Adel Karam (born 1972) – actor, comedian and TV presenter
- Joseph Sakr (1942–1997) – singer and stage actor
- Fares Souaid (born 1958) – politician, former MP, Secretariat General Coordinator of the March 14 Alliance and doctor
- Nouhad Souaid (1931–2016) – politician and former MP
