= Isabel Allende (disambiguation) =

Isabel Allende (born 1942) is a Chilean writer.

Isabel Allende may also refer to:

- Isabel Allende (politician) (born 1945), Chilean politician
- Isabel Allende Cano (born 1963), Mexican politician
- Isabel Allende Karam (1969–1998), Cuban diplomat and translator
