= Listed buildings in Eaton, Nottinghamshire =

Eaton is a civil parish in the Bassetlaw District of Nottinghamshire, England. The parish contains six listed buildings that are recorded in the National Heritage List for England. All the listed buildings are designated at Grade II, the lowest of the three grades, which is applied to "buildings of national importance and special interest". The parish contains the village of Eaton and the surrounding area. All the listed buildings are in the village, and consist of two cottages, two farmhouses, a school and a church.

== Buildings ==
Name and location	Photograph	Date	Notes
2 and 3 Main Street; 53.29476°N 0.93328°W		Mid 18th century	A cottage, later divided into two, in red brick, with a floor band, a dentilled and dogtooth eaves band, and a pantile roof, hipped on the right, and with a brick coped gable and kneelers on the left. There are two storeys, five bays, and rear extensions. On the front are two gabled porches with pointed arched entrances. Most of the windows are casements, those on the ground floor with segmental heads, and there is one horizontally-sliding sash window.
Hall Farmhouse; 53.29396°N 0.93503°W	—	Mid 18th century	The farmhouse, which was refronted in the 19th century, is in red brick, with dentilled eaves, and a hipped pantile roof. There are two storeys, a front of three bays, and rear wings with one and two storeys. In the centre is a doorway with pilasters and a fanlight, and a hood on two wooden columns. The windows are sashes with cambered heads and flush wedge lintels.
Home Farm Cottage; 53.29417°N 0.93335°W	—	18th century	The cottage, which was refronted in the 19th century, is in red brick, with dentilled eaves, and a pantile roof. There are two storeys and three bays, and a recessed lean-to on the right. In the centre is a doorway, above which is a blind panel, and the windows are a mix of casements and horizontally-sliding sashes; all the openings and the panel have segmental heads.
Home Farmhouse; 53.29455°N 0.93330°W	—	Mid 18th century	The farmhouse is in red brick, with a floor band, dentilled and dogtooth eaves, and a pantile roof with brick coped gables. There are two storeys and an attic, a front range of five bays, and extensions on both sides and at the rear. In the centre is a gabled porch with a pointed arched entrance, and the windows are sashes.
Jamia Al-Karam; 53.29532°N 0.93238°W	—	Early 19th century	A house, later extended and converted into a school, it is stuccoed and has a slate roof, hipped on the left. There are three storeys and eight bays, the left five bays on a plinth. On the front is a single-storey projecting bay containing a doorway with a moulded eared and shouldered architrave, and this is flanked by single-storey segmental bow windows. The other windows are sashes, those in the middle floor with moulded surrounds and a pediment, and in the top floor with moulded surrounds.
All Saints' Church; 53.29399°N 0.93592°W		1856–58	The church, designed by George Shaw, is in stone with a tile roof. It consists of a nave, a north porch, a chancel and a south vestry. On the ridge of the nave is a bell turret with open wooden traceried cusped panels and a swept tile roof. The windows are in Decorated style.
