= Kerim =

Disambiguation page

Kerim is both a masculine given name and a surname. People with the name include:

== Given name ==
- Kerim Chatty (born 1973), Swedish man suspected of attempted hijacking of an aircraft in 2002
- Kerim Erim (1894–1952), Turkish mathematician and physicist
- Kerim Frei (born 1993), Turkish-Swiss footballer
- Kerim Kerimov (1917–2003), Azerbaijani rocket scientist
- Kerim Seiler (born 1974), Swiss artist and architect
- Kerim Tatar (born 1996), Bosnian footballer
- Kerim Zengin (born 1985), Turkish footballer
- Kerim Mrabti (born 1994), Swedish footballer

== Surname ==
- Mahmoud Kerim (1916–1999), squash player from Egypt
- Reşat Kerim (born 1986), Azerbaijani footballer
- Srgjan Kerim (born 1948), former President of the United Nations General Assembly
- Tijani Ould Kerim (born 1951), Mauritania teacher and diplomat
- Usin Kerim (1929-1983), Romani poet
- Yaya Kerim (born 1991), Chadian football striker

== See also ==
- Karim (disambiguation)
- Kerimäki
- Kerimler (disambiguation)
- Kerimov
- Krim (disambiguation)
