= Karameh (disambiguation) =

Karameh (Arabic: كرامة, 'dignity') may refer to:

- Karameh or Al-Karameh, a town in central Jordan
  - Battle of Karameh, 1968
- Karameh Border Crossing, between Jordan and Iraq
- Karameh, East Azerbaijan, Iran
- Kharameh County or Karameh County, Fars Province, Iran
  - Kharameh, a city

== See also ==
- Karamah (disambiguation), literary Arabic pronunciation
- Karam (disambiguation)
- Karama (disambiguation)
- Karamat (disambiguation)
- Karami also the francicized Karamé, alternative spellings of Karameh
- Karam (disambiguation)
