= Karamah =

Karamah or Karama (Arabic, كرامة, 'dignity') may refer to:

== Places ==
- Al Karama, Dubai, UAE
- Al Karama, United Arab Emirates, a former planned capital of UAE
- Al-Karamah Subdistrict, Raqqa District, Syria
- Al-Karamah, Raqqa Governorate, Syria
- Al-Karamah, Tartus Governorate, Syria

== Other uses ==
- Alkarama, an independent Swiss-based human rights NGO
- Al-Karamah SC, a Syrian football club

== See also ==
- Karameh (disambiguation), colloquial pronunciation
- Karama (disambiguation)
- Karamat (disambiguation)
- Karami
- Karam (disambiguation)
- Dignity Party (Egypt) (Ḥizb al-Karāma), an Egyptian political party
