= George Shaw (architect) =

English architect

George Shaw (1810–76) was an English Protestant architect specialising in the building, extending, and refurbishing of churches, homes, and educational buildings in the Gothic Revival style. He was also a deeply enthusiastic antiquary connected to many like-minded local and national scholars, collectors, and heralds; Shaw not only visited, studied, and recorded historical sites and their remaining material culture, but he also collected historic remains from the medieval, Tudor, and Jacobean eras, especially when they were of local importance, or were connected to his families (the Shaws and Radcliffe). Materials include books, armour, furniture, and architectural salvage.

== Early life ==
George Shaw was born in Uppermill, in the parish of Saddleworth in the West Riding of Yorkshire, on 5 October 1810. He was the eldest son of Giles Shaw, the owner of a woollen mill, and his wife Elizabeth, née Radcliffe. Giles Shaw also owned most of the land on which the village of Uppermill stands today. George was schooled locally, probably at Boarshurst school, Saddleworth, which opened in 1814, and had joined his father's firm by the age of nineteen. In 1830 he became a traveller for the mill, visiting customers all over the north of England, the Midlands, and southern Scotland. Although diligent in business on his father's behalf, George aspired to a different life as a collector and antiquary, and through the support of his friend and mentor the Reverend Francis Raines (1805–78), made contact with other antiquaries both locally and further afield. From about 1830 he began to convert his parents’ farmhouse in Uppermill into a ‘Gothic’ manorhouse with interiors inspired by Sir Walter Scott's home at Abbottsford, Scotland. For the interior woodwork Shaw used a combination of salvaged late medieval woodwork together with joinery and carving of his own invention. He later named the house St Chad's and it survives today as Uppermill Public Library. By the early 1840s Shaw had acquired a reputation locally as an antiquary and authority on Gothic and Tudor architecture, and he began to think of an architectural career as an escape from his work in the woollen trade. In 1842 he was consulted by John Tollemache, 1st Baron Tollemache, about Anthony Salvin's plans for reconstructing Peckforton Castle in Cheshire. The same year he was asked by James Dearden, owner of the Manor of Rochdale, to create a faux-medieval chapel in the parish church of St Chad's, Rochdale, where the Deardens had bought the rights to the Trinity Chapel on the south side of the chancel. Between 1842 and 1850 Shaw installed woodwork, memorial brasses and tomb slabs, most of which survive today, although not all are in their original positions. At about the same time he supplied the pulpit, lectern, and more at nearby St Leonard's, Middleton.

== Architectural works ==
The first complete church built to Shaw's design was St John the Baptist, Birtle, built 1845–46. His second architectural commission was to build the new church, parsonage, school and master's house at Friezland, begun in 1848. It was financed by the Whitehead brothers, owners of the Royal George Mills at Greenfield. This was said to have been designed in conjunction with the Glasgow architect/builder James Henderson (1809–96), who specialised in Gothic revival churches.

About 1850 Shaw began to distance himself from his father's woollen business, allowing him to devote more time to his architecture, and the mill was finally sold to John Winterbottom Bradbury in 1864. In the meantime, further church commissions followed as new parishes were created in the 1850s and 1860s to cope with the rapidly increasing populations of Manchester's outlying villages. George's youngest brother, John Radcliffe Shaw, joined him in the business and was said to possess considerable artistic ability. James Lawton (1819-1907), a family protegé whom the Shaws sponsored through an architectural training in Huddersfield, also worked with George Shaw and became, in effect, his successor. Unlike many architects, Shaw not only designed buildings but also built them, using predominantly local workmen under his direction. The site of Shaw's original workshops is not known but they were probably in the outbuildings at St Chad's. They later moved to Victoria Mill, since demolished and now the site of the car park of Saddleworth Museum. All the building trades were represented, including masons, carvers and joiners, and it was said that Shaw was able to provide work for up to a hundred men. He was also able to supply stained glass, and about 1860 set up a glass furnace next to his house for the purpose. Although most of his buildings are in what is now greater Manchester, he also undertook commissions further afield, in North Yorkshire, Nottinghamshire, Lancashire and North Wales.

== Career as a faker ==
A less well known side of Shaw's work was the manufacture of fake furniture, stone monuments, memorial brasses, iron firebacks and firedogs. It grew out of the experience he gained repairing and restoring antique furniture and woodwork as he transformed the interiors of his own house in the 1830s and received added impetus from 1842 onwards from the commission to create the Trinity Chapel in Rochdale. In the late 1840s he sold fake Tudor and Jacobean furniture to Edward Smith-Stanley, 13th Earl of Derby, one of the sideboards (or beaufets) now on display in the Anne Boleyn Great Chamber at Hever Castle, Kent, and Algernon Percy, 4th Duke of Northumberland. Most of the latter work survives at Warkworth Castle, Northumberland. Shaw also tried to persuade George ' Bridgeman, 2nd Earl of Bradford, to buy a fake ‘State Bed’ and other items, but it is not known whether he was successful. It is likely that Shaw ceased fabricating antiques about 1850 as his architectural career gathered momentum. His own bed, created from a mix of old and new parts, is on display in Ordsall Hall, Salford.

== Later life ==
By the 1860s Shaw's business was thriving and his local reputation high. He served as Justice of the Peace and was a staunch supporter of the established Church (Hyde & Petford). He was one of the primary supporters of the Saddleworth Exhibition, which opened at the Mechanics’ Institute in August 1853, and the Oldham Industrial Exhibition of the following year. Both featured a ‘Baronial Hall’ displaying arms, armour, furniture and relics contributed by Shaw and other local antiquaries. The Saddleworth Exhibition was the subject of a gently satirical account in Household Words which described how the families of the district ‘must have dismantled their houses and drawings of some of their most valuable adornments’ to fill the displays. George Shaw never married and after his death in 1876 St Chad's was left in trust to James Lawton and after his death in 1907 to Lawton's daughter. Much of the land around St Chad's was sold and about 1882 the Manchester & County Bank was built on the east side of site, demolishing most of Shaw's private chapel in the process. In 1920 St Chad's itself was bought by Uppermill Urban District Council and its contents were sold by auction. As well as his bed now in Ordsall Hall, some of his furniture survives at Saddleworth Museum and in the ownership of private collectors in the locality.

== List of Shaw's churches ==
Churches wholly or partly by George Shaw, or which he supplied with interior fittings and furniture, include:

- Ashton-under-Lyne, St James, 1865
- Bury, St Mary the Virgin, c.1850 (furniture now moved to Ainsworth, Christchurch)
- Calderbrook, St James, 1860–64
- Carlecotes, St Anne, 1857
- Crumpsall, St Thomas and St Mark, 1863
- Dunham Town, St Mark, 1866
- Eaton, All Saints, 1860
- Gorton, St James, 1871
- Greenfield, St Mary, 1875
- Healey, Christ Church, 1849–50
- Hurst, St John the Evangelist, 1862
- Kirby Wharfe, St John the Baptist, 1861
- Llanfairfechan, Christ Church, 1863–64
- Manchester Cathedral, c.1860 (lectern only)
- Millbrook, St James, 1861–63
- Norden, St Paul, 1859–61
- Parkfield, Holy Trinity, 1861–62
- Penistone, St John the Baptist, 1862
- Prestolee, Holy Trinity, 1859–62
- Ripponden, St Bartholomew, 1868
- Rochdale, St Chad's, 1842–50
- Saddleworth, St Chad's 1846–47
- Scarisbrick, St Mark, 1848–51
- Wardle, St James, 1856–58
- Werneth, St Thomas, 1853–55
- Wingates, St John the Evangelist, 1859.

== Other work ==
A number of secular commissions are known, including:

- Ashway Gap House, 1850, for John Platt of Platt Brothers textile machinery company (demolished 1981)
- Bryn y Newydd, Llanfairfechan, c.1863, a house for John Platt
- Chetham's Library, c.1850 (furniture only)
- Mechanics' Institute, Uppermill, 1859
- Prescot, Almshouses, 1861
- Wharmton Tower, c.1861, a house for John Dicken Whitehead.

Other recently discovered clients include the Mosley family of Rolleston Hall in Staffordshire.
