= Kadhim al-Quraishi =

Iraqi Actor

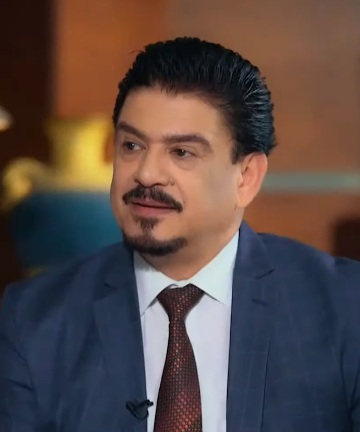
Kadhim al-Quraishi as a guest on Altaghier TV, April 26, 2021

Kadhim Al-Quraishi (Arabic: كاظم القريشي) (April 13, 1967 Wasit, Iraq) is an Iraqi actor. He won as the best actor for the work of "Amtar Al-Nar" (Arabic: أمطار النار) and the best Iraqi actor for the year 2009 for the work of "Al-Dahana" (Arabic: الدهانة), and as the best Iraqi actor for the year 2011 for the work of "Abu Tabar" (Arabic: أبو طبر). He was pointed as the manager of the Iraqi theaters in the Iraqi Cinema and Theater Foundation from 2013 to 2015 and was director of the Baghdad International Theater Festival. He won dozens of awards and honors inside and outside Iraq and was honored at The Cairo International Festival for Experimental Theatre (CIFET) in 2015. He also presented many radio series and is classified as having a distinguished and tender voice, and he was one of the judges of the jury in the Iraqi poet program for performance and voice evaluation.

== Projects ==
=== TV series ===
1. The Pin & The Tribulation (Arabic: القلم والمحنة), written by Farouq Mohammed and directed by Qahtan Abduljaleel.
2. The Time & The Dust (Arabic: الزمن والغبار), written and directed by Hashem Abu Iraq.
3. The imam Shafi’i.
4. "Al-Tassah Wa Al-Hammam" (Arabic: الطاسة والحمام), directed by Ali Hannon.
5. "Sarah Khatoun", written by Hamed Al-Maliki and directed by Salah Karam.
6. "The 18 series", written Abbas Al-Harbi.
7. The Rain of Fire "Amtar Al-Nar", written by Sabah Aatwan and directed by Aazam Salih for Al-Baghdadia TV.
8. Love in the Village "Hob Fee Al-Qariah", S1 & S2 written by Dhyaa Salem and directed by Saheb Bazoon for Al-Iraqia TV.
9. Years of Fire "Sanawat Al-Nar", written by Sabah Aatwan and directed by Hashem Abu Iraq.
10. The Love & Peace "Al-Hob wa Al-Salam", written by Hamed Al-Maliki and directed by Tammer Ezaq.
11. "Warshat Al-Warrad", directed by Ali Abu Yousif.
12. "Al-Dahana", written by Hamed Al-Maliki and directed by Ali Abu Yousif.
13. "Abu Tabar", written by Hamed Al-Maliki and directed by the Syrian Director Sami Janadi.
14. "Al-Qannas", written by Fatten Al-soud and directed by Arkan Jehad.
15. Salima Pasha, written by Falah Shaker and directed by Bassem Abdulqahar.
16. The Devil in a Woman's Heart "Al-shatan Fee Qalb Almaraa ".
17. Absent in Wonderland "Ghayeb Fee Bilad Al-aagayeb".
18. Amerli series directed by "Ahmad Ebrahim Ahmed" and produced by "Amir Mehdi Pourvaziri"

=== Movies ===
Daydreams "Ahlam Al-yaqadha", written by Ghaydaa Al-ali and directed by Salah Akram.
