= Eaton, Nottinghamshire =

Village and civil parish in Nottinghamshire, England

Coordinates: 53.29°N 0.93°W

Eaton
- Village and Civil parish
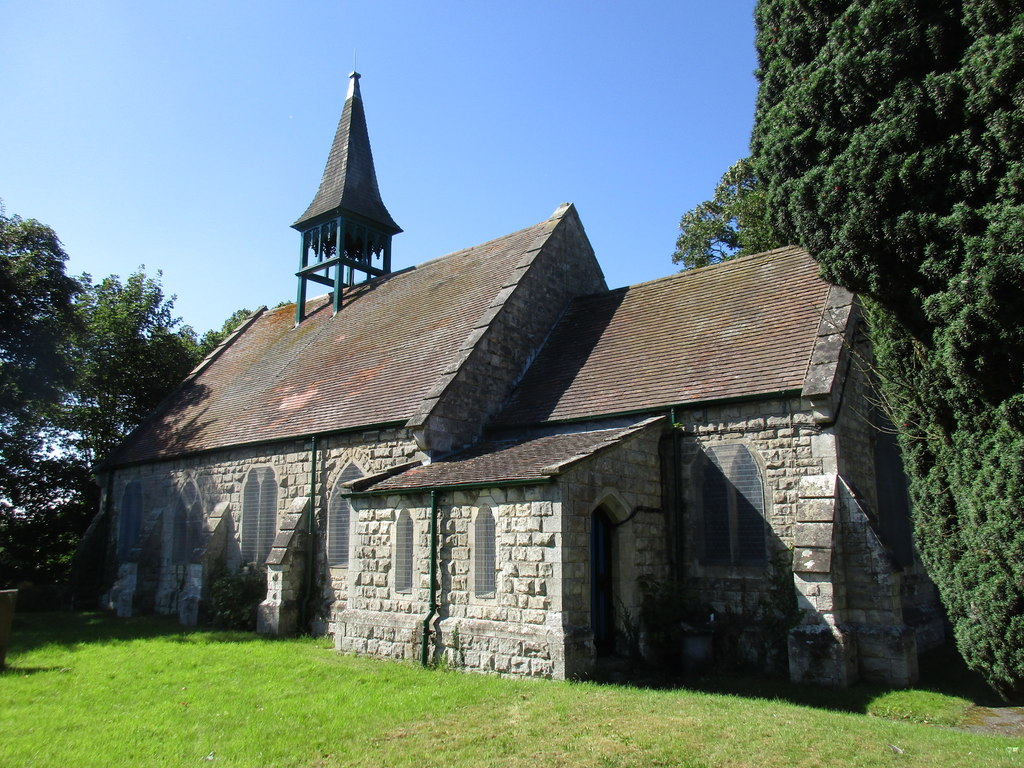
- The Church of All Saints

- Location within Nottinghamshire
- Interactive map of Eaton
- Area: 2.38 sq mi (6.2 km^{2})
- Population: 111 (2021)
  - Density: 47/sq mi (18/km^{2})
- OS grid reference: SK711780
  - London: 125 mi (201 km) SE
- District: Bassetlaw
- Shire county: Nottinghamshire
- Region: East Midlands
- Country: England
- Sovereign state: United Kingdom
- Post town: RETFORD
- Postcode district: DN22
- Dialling code: 01777
- Police: Nottinghamshire
- Fire: Nottinghamshire
- Ambulance: East Midlands
- UK Parliament: Newark
- Website: www.gamstonwestdraytoneatonparishcouncil.co.uk

Eaton is a village and civil parish in Nottinghamshire, England. Eaton is located 2 miles south of Retford, on the A638 road, the former Great North Road. According to the 2001 census it had a population of 105, increasing to 233 at the 2011 census, and 111 in 2021.

== History ==
All Saints' Church was completely rebuilt in 1860 in Decorated style.

=== 1955 Gloster Meteor crash ===
On Friday 1 April 1955, Gloster Meteor 'WL474' crashed at Eaton Corner, 30 yards from the main road, now the A638. The Meteor aircraft was from RAF Gamston and RAF Worksop. Fire engines attended from Tuxford and Retford. The two aircrew were both killed.

- Flying Officer Stanley Thomas Jenkins, aged 26, was an instructor, and lived at 61 Sandhurst Avenue in Mansfield, originally from Tamworth, Staffordshire, attended the Queen Elizabeth Grammar School, one of three brothers who joined the RAF, one was killed during the war, and the other was a squadron leader. His wife Jean was a nurse at Harlow Wood Orthopaedic Hospital in Mansfield.
- Pilot Officer Duncan Herbert Moffat, aged 28, of 100 Old Fosse Road in Somerset

== Education ==
Al Karam Secondary School was located in the village before its closure in 2014. It is now known as Jamia Al-Karam which now occupies the site.

Eaton Hall was a teacher training college from the 1940s until 1981, the Eaton Hall College of Education.

== See also ==
- Listed buildings in Eaton, Nottinghamshire
- Stoke Rochford Hall
