= Karamata =

Karamata may refer to:

- Jovan Karamata (1902–1967), Serbian mathematician
  - Karamata's inequality
- Karamata Family House, a cultural monument in Belgrade, Serbia

== See also ==
- Kalamata, a city in southern Greece
- Kalamata (disambiguation)
- Karamat (disambiguation)
