= Karamat Ali =

Karamat Ali or Keramat Ali may refer to:

- Karamat Ali Jaunpuri (1800–1873), Indian Islamic scholar
- Sheikh Karamat Ali (died 1951), Pakistani politician from Punjab
- Md. Keramat Ali (1901–1969), Bengali politician from Sylhet
- Mohammad Keramat Ali (1926–2004), former Bangladeshi Minister of Shipping
- Karamat Ali Karamat (1936–2022), Indian Urdu poet
- Keramat Ali Talukdar, Bangladeshi politician from Mymensingh
- Kazi Keramat Ali (born 1954), former Bangladeshi State Minister of Education
- Karamat Ali (cricketer) (born 1996), Pakistani first-class cricketer
- Md. Keramat Ali (Chapai Nawabganj politician) (born 1958), Bangladeshi politician from Chapai Nawabganj
