= Uppermill Civic Hall =

Municipal building in Uppermill, Greater Manchester, England

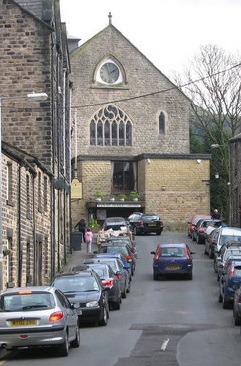
- The building in 2009

- Shown in Greater Manchester
- 53.5474°N 2.0045°W
- Location: Lee Street, Uppermill

History
- Built: 1859

Site notes
- Architect: George Shaw
- Architectural style: Gothic Revival style

Uppermill Civic Hall, also known as Saddleworth Civic Hall, is a municipal building in Lee Street, Uppermill, a village in Greater Manchester in England. The building currently serves as the offices and meeting place of Saddleworth Parish Council.

== History ==
The building was commissioned as a mechanics' institute. Community events intended to raise funds for the institute included a major exhibition held in 1853. The site local leaders selected was open ground near Uppermill Bridge. The building was designed by a local architect, George Shaw, in the Gothic Revival style, built in rubble masonry and was officially opened by George Howard, 7th Earl of Carlisle on 17 June 1859.

The design involved a symmetrical main frontage of three bays facing down Court Street. The main frontage was fenestrated by a large gothic window with tracery flanked by a pair of cusped lancet windows. There was a clock with a hood mould in the centre of the gable above. In 1862, a beam gave way, and around 100 people fell from the upper room to the lower floor, resulting in several injuries but no deaths.

Following significant population growth, largely associated with the number of cotton mills in the area, a local board of health was established in Saddleworth in 1868. In 1894, the local board of health was succeeded by Uppermill Urban District Council. In 1900, this became part of the new Saddleworth Urban District Council, which used the building as its meeting place. An improved entrance hall was established in the 1930s.

During the Second World War events were held during Wings for Victory Week to raise money for Spitfires for the Royal Air Force. The district council subsequently carried out works to modernise the mechanics' institute and to make it fit for municipal use: the works included a three-bay entrance block which featured a blind wall with a balcony above in the left-hand bay, a double-doorway with a casement window above in the centre bay, and a blind section at the right, which was projected forward. The works were completed in 1961. The district council also opened offices at St Chad's Parish Centre, further along Lee Street.

The building continued to serve as the meeting place of the district council for much of the 20th century, but ceased to be the local seat of government when the enlarged Oldham Borough Council was formed in 1974. The civic hall subsequently became the offices and meeting place of the new Saddleworth Parish Council. A major brass band concert, involving the Black Dyke Band, the Fairey Band and the Grimethorpe Colliery Band, was held in aid of the charity, Help for Heroes, in January 2015. An extensive programme of refurbishment works was completed in January 2017, creating a variety of event spaces. These included a council chamber and two halls on the ground floor, a 440-capacity ballroom, bar and kitchen on the first floor, and three rooms on the second floor.
