= Karem =

Karem is a masculine given name and surname of Arabic origin. Notable people with the name include:

== Given name ==
- Karem Achach (born 1991), Mexican synchronized swimmer
- Karem Arshid (born 1995), Israeli footballer
- Karem Ben Hnia (born 1994), Tunisian Olympic weightlifter
- Karem Mahmoud (1922–1995), Egyptian singer and actor
- Karem A. Sakallah, American electrical engineer and computer scientist
- Karem Shivaji (born 1978), Indian politician and activist
- Karem Zoabi (born 2006), Israeli footballer

== Surname ==
- Abraham Karem (born 1937), Israeli-American aerospace engineer
- Arfa Karem (1995–2012), Pakistani student and computer prodigy
- Brian Karem (born 1961), American journalist
- David Karem (born 1943), American politician
- Robert Karem (born 1977), American politician

== Other uses ==
- Karem Aircraft, an American aerospace company
- Carem or Karem, a place mentioned in the Septuagint translation of the Hebrew Bible

== See also ==
- Karey (disambiguation)
- Karim, and variant spellings, a name
- Ein Karem, or ʿAyn Kārim, a neighbourhood in Jerusalem
- Carrom, a tabletop game
