= Nouhad Souhaid =

Lebanes politician

Nouhad Souaid
- Born: 1931-2016
- Education: Université Saint Joseph
- Occupation: Politician
- Movement: Chehabism

Nouhad Souaid was a Lebanese politician and public figure, known for her significant contributions to Lebanese political life and her role as a representative of the Qartaba region. She is the mother of MP Fares Souaid.

== Early life and education ==
She was born into a politically engaged family; her father was a magistrate, which laid the groundwork for her future involvement in law and politics.

Nouhad Souaid was educated at the school of the Sisters of Besançon and pursued legal studies at the Université Saint-Joseph (USJ) during a time when few women completed higher education in Lebanon.

== Personal life ==
Throughout her education, Souaid gained considerable attention from her male peers due to the gender imbalance in her school environment. Following her studies, she married Dr. Antoine Souaid, a respected surgeon who played a crucial role in the medical community and local politics.

== Political career ==
Souaid's political journey began in earnest after the untimely death of her husband in 1965, when she was left with six children and significant debts. Encouraged by supporters of her late husband and members of the local political community, she decided to run for election, ultimately entering the Lebanese Parliament in 1996. She has been recognized for her determination and resilience even by her opponents. Her journey in politics has inspired many, particularly women, to engage more actively in public life.
