= Joseph Sakr =

Lebanese singer and actor

Joseph Sakr (Arabic: جوزيف صقر; 1942 – 1997) was a popular Lebanese folkloric and pop singer and stage actor.

== Career ==
Born in Kartaba, Joseph Sakr started as a school teacher teaching French. He later joined the Popular Lebanese Group (الفرقة الشعبية اللبنانية) accompanying performances of the Lebanese pan-Arab singer Fairuz and later on became a prominent singer with the Rahbani Brothers and appeared in a prominent or supporting roles in a great number of their musicals on stage including Lulu, Mays el Reem etc. His renditions "El haleh taabane, ya Laila", "Ana elli alayki meshtaq" and "'A hadeer el bosta" are renowned in Lebanon, the Levant and the Arab World. Sakr was also a regular feature in most of the stage plays of Ziad Rahbani.

== Personal life ==
He was married to Ghada and had two children. His son Raji Sakr has also chosen a musical path.

== Death ==
He died in Beirut in 1997.

== Songs ==
(selective)

- "El haleh taabane, ya Laila" (in Arabic الحالة تعبانة يا ليلى)
- "Ana elli alayki meshtaq" (in Arabic أنا اللي عليكي مشتاق)
- "'A hadeer el bosta" (in Arabic ع هدير البوسطة)

== Appearances in musical plays ==
with Rahbani Brothers

- 1974: Lulu (in Arabic لولو) - as Fares Beik
- 1975: Mays el Reem (in Arabic ميس الريم) - as El Nasnass

with Ziad Rahbani

- 1973: Sahriyyeh (in Arabic سهرية) - in the role of Nakhle el Tennin
- 1974: Nazl el Srour (in Arabic نزل السرور) - in the role of Barakat
- 1978: Bil nisbeh la bukra shou? (in Arabic بالنسبة لبكرا شو؟) - in the role of Ramez
- 1980: Film Amerki taweel (in Arabic فيلم أميركي طويل) - in role of Abou Laila
- 1983: Shi fashel (in Arabic شي فاشل) as the mukhtar
- 1993: Bi khsous el Karameh wel shaab el aneed (in Arabic بخصوص الكرامة والشعب العنيد) - in the role of Es Sarraf
- 1994: Lawla feshat el amal (in Arabic لولا فسحة الأمل)
