= Kalamata (disambiguation) =

Kalamata is a city on the Peloponnese peninsula in southern Greece.

Kalamata may also refer to:

- Kalamata olive, a cultivar of olive
- Kalamata International Airport, an airport in Kalamata
- Kalamata F.C., professional football club
- Kalamata Municipal Stadium, sports arena in Kalamata
- Fort Kalamata, fort on the island of Ternate in Maluku Islands, Indonesia
- Kalamata (DRC), village in eastern DRC

== See also ==
- Karamata (disambiguation)
