= Kerem =

Kerem is a Turkish male given name of Arabic origin. People named Kerem include:

- Kerem Alışık (born 1960), Turkish actor and television presenter
- Kerem Bulut (born 1992), Turkish-Australian footballer
- Kerem Demirbay (born 1993), Turkish-German footballer
- Kerem Gönlüm (born 1977), Turkish basketball player
- Kerem Kabadayı (born 1977), Turkish rock musician
- Kerem Özkan (born 1988), Turkish professional basketball player
- Kerem Primo (born 2005), Israeli judoka
- Kerem Şener (born 2003), Turkish artistic gymniast
- Kerem Şeras (born 1984), Turkish footballer
- Kerem Tunçeri (born 1979), Turkish professional basketball player
- Kerem Yılmazer (1945-2003), Turkish actor
- Kerem Bürsin (born 1987), Turkish actor
- Kerem Kanter (born 1995), Turkish basketball player
- Kerem Cem Dürük (born 1977), Turkish pop singer and actor

== Fictional characters ==
- Kerem, protagonist of Turkish folk poetic story Kerem and Aslı and its adaptations

== See also ==
- Karam (name)
