= Karameh, East Azerbaijan =

Karameh كرامه
- Village
- Location within Iran
- Coordinates: 37°20′58″N 47°40′57″E
- Country: Iran
- Province: East Azerbaijan
- County: Meyaneh
- Bakhsh: Central
- Rural District: Kolah Boz-e Sharqi

Population (2006)
  - Total: 202
- Time zone: UTC+3:30 (IRST)
  - Summer (DST): UTC+4:30 (IRDT)

Karameh (Persian: كرامه, also Romanized as Karāmeh) is a village in Kolah Boz-e Sharqi Rural District, in the Central District of Meyaneh County, East Azerbaijan Province, Iran. At the 2006 census, its population was 202, in 50 families.
