= Michael Karam =

Lebanese author and journalist (born 1965)

- Born: 1 May 1965 (age 61); London, England
- Occupations: Writer, Journalist, Communication Consultant
- Writing career
- Language: English
- Genres: Lebanese- and wine-related topics
- Notable works: Wines of Lebanon; Arak and Mezze: the taste of Lebanon; Tears of Bacchus; Wine and War

Michael Ramzi Karam (Arabic: ميشال كرم; born 1 May 1965 in London, England) is a British/Lebanese author and journalist. He is notably the author of Wines of Lebanon, and was involved in the production of the feature-length documentary, Wine and War.

== Career ==
Michael Karam began his career as a journalist in Beirut. He founded the listings magazine What's On in 1996 before moving to The Daily Star (Lebanon) in early 1998 as Features editor. Between 2002 and 2007, he was the editor of Executive, a Lebanese business magazine, before moving into political and corporate PR.

In 2007, he was appointed executive director of New Opinion Workshop and founded NowLebanon, the pro-democracy news and opinion website spawned by the 2005 Cedar Revolution, a post he held until 2012. His writings on politics, business, war and wine have appeared in The Spectator, The Times, Esquire, Decanter, Harpers Wine and Spirits Weekly and Monocle.

In 2005, his first book Wines of Lebanon, which won the 2005 Gourmand World Cookbook Award. His second book, Arak And Mezze: The Taste of Lebanon is about Lebanon's national drink and what best to eat with it. It was shortlisted for the Gourmand Award for Best Food and Travel Book 2007.

He is a contributor to The Oxford Companion to Wine, The World Atlas of Wine, Hugh Johnson’s Pocket Wine Book and The Sotheby's Wine Encyclopedia.

He has also written Château Ksara: 150 years of wine making 1957-2007 and in October 2010, he published Michael Karam's Lebanese Wines 2011, a pocket paperback and first comprehensive guide to all the Lebanese wines currently on the market.

=== Collaborations ===
In 2011, he began working with Dr Patrick McGovern from University of Pennsylvania and other experts to compile Tears of Bacchus: A History of Winemaking in the Middle East and Beyond, which was published in 2020.

=== Bibliography ===
- Life's Like That (2004)
- Wines of Lebanon (2005)
- Chateau Ksara: 150 Years of Winemaking (2006)
- Life's Even More Like That (2007)
- Arak and Mezze: The Taste of Lebanon (2008)
- Michael Karam's Lebanese Wines (2011)
- Tears of Bacchus: A History of Winemaking in the Arab World (Editor) (2020)
- Wines of Lebanon: The Journey Continues (2025)

=== Films ===
Karam collaborated with filmmakers Mark Johnston and Mark Ryan on Wine and War, a feature documentary about the entrepreneurial spirit in times of war seen through the lens of Lebanon and its winemakers. The film, due for release in September 2020, looks at the challenges of making wine in a region that has always witnessed upheaval and yet one which around 3,500 years ago, via the Phoenician traders, gave the gift of wine to the world. The documentary charts this historical journey, focusing mainly on testimonies from winemakers and other Lebanese from latter part of the 20th Century, in particular those who endured the 1975-91 civil war and the 2006 summer war and who continue to be affected by the ongoing conflict in neighbouring Syria and the political instability that defines Lebanon and the wider Middle East. Their astonishing stories tell of bravery, determination, and survival and how wine can be a unifier and a metaphor for life, hospitality, civilization, and above all a force for good in a region defined by turmoil and animosity.
