= All Saints' Church, Eaton =

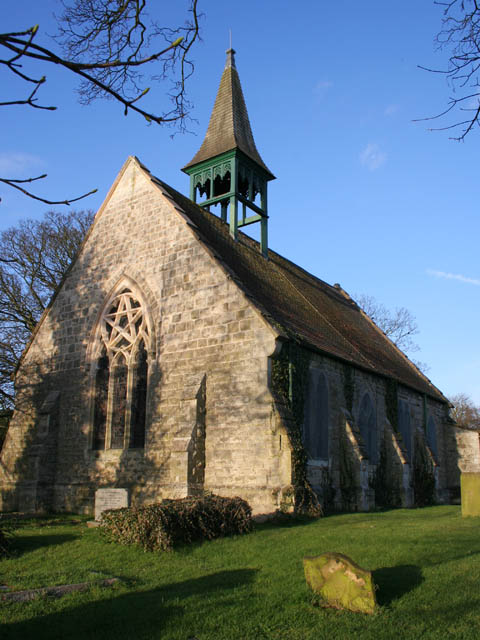
- All Saints' Church, Eaton
- All Saints' Church, Eaton
- 53°17′37.87″N 0°56′10.3″W
- OS grid reference: SK 71021 77970
- Location: Eaton, Nottinghamshire
- Country: England
- Denomination: Church of England
- Website: www.achurchnearyou.com

History
- Dedication: All Saints'

Architecture
- Heritage designation: Grade II listed
- Architect: G Shaw
- Completed: 1860

Administration
- Province: York
- Diocese: Diocese of Southwell and Nottingham
- Archdeaconry: Newark
- Deanery: Bassetlaw and Bawtry
- Parish: Eaton & Gamston

Clergy
- Bishop(s): The Bishop of Southwell & Nottingham

All Saints' Church is a Grade II listed parish church in the Church of England in Eaton, Nottinghamshire.

== History ==
The church was rebuilt 1860 in Steetley stone by G. Shaw of Manchester for H. Bridgeman Simpson of Babworth Hall. The south chancel wall however contains a 15th-century piscina.

== Organ ==
The church contains a small pipe organ of 4 stops.

== Bell ==
There is one bell hung for swing chiming in the bell cote.

== Group of Churches ==
This church is one of the churches that makes up the Elkesley Group. The churches are:

- All Saints', Eaton
- St Peter, Gamston
- St Paul, West Drayton
- St Giles, Elkesley
- Our Lady & St Peter, Bothamsall

The group was under the care of a Lay Worker who was installed at Elkesley, St Giles on Thursday 5 February 2015.

== See also ==
- Listed buildings in Eaton, Nottinghamshire
