= Al Karam Secondary School =

Al-Karam Secondary School
- Jamia Al-Karam

Location
- Eaton Hall, Eaton; Retford, Nottinghamshire, DN22 0PR; England

Information
- Type: Private boarding school
- Religious affiliation: Sunni Islam
- Established: 1995
- Closed: 2014
- Department for Education URN: 122945 Tables
- Principal: Muhammad Imdad Hussain Pirzada
- Gender: Boys
- Age: 11 to 16
- Website: www.alkaram.org

Al-Karam Secondary School, a project of Jamia Al-Karam, (Arabic: جامعة الکرم) was a Muslim boarding school and Islamic Studies College located in Eaton, England.

The school was managed by Muhammad Imdad Hussain Pirzada.
