= Karem Shivaji =

Indian activist

Karem Sivaji
- Born: 25 December 1978 (age 47); West Godavari district, India
- Occupations: EX - CHAIRMAN SC,ST COMMISSION Government of Andhra Pradesh Dalit Social activist & Founder of Mala Mahanadu and National president
- Spouse: Rajeswari
- Children: Raviteja, Kiran Mohan, Laxmi Bhavani
- Parent(s): Karem Mohan Rao (late), Sarojini

Karem Sivaji (born 25 December 1978) is the founder and national president of Mala Mahanadu. He is the leading voice of the Mala community. He is the prominent face of Mala community voicing the community's stand in Print and Electronic Media. He is appointed as the first chairman of Sc,St Commission of the divided Andhra state under the Honourable Chief minister Sri Nara Chandrababu Naidu garu.

== Background ==
Mr.Sivaji is from West Godavari district, India which has a sizeable population of Mala (caste). He played a prominent role in Mala Mahanadu and rose to level of national president. He is a strong Opponent of Categorization of Scheduled Castes. Mala Mahanadu was united when it was under P.V Rao but after his death it was divided owing to the differences among the top leaders. Karem alleges that Jupudi was the stooge of Congress and his stir was aimed at diluting the Mala's agitation.

== Social activism ==
Karem Sivaji has undertaken many hunger strikes to put pressure on Government to stop SC categorization. Mala mahanadu activists under his leadership staged dharnas before the Collectorates, climbed Cell phone towers, attempted suicides to show their resistance to SC Categorization. Karem was arrested on many occasions for doing such things.

Shivaji believed in Chiru's social justice and has supported PRP during 2009 elections. However he is politically active unlike his rival Jupudi who is now in YSR Congress Party. He is also in favour of bifurcation of state as it would make Mala's a key social group in Coastal Andhra region and the division will make SCs strong contenders for CM's post in both states.
