= Jamia Al-Karam =

Private college in Nottinghamshire

- جامعة الكرم

Location
- Eaton Hall, Eaton, Nottinghamshire; Retford, Nottinghamshire, DN22 0PR; United Kingdom; 53.2952°N 0.9313°W

Information
- Type: Private/Independent
- Religious affiliations: Sunni, Sufi
- Established: 1985
- Founder: Muhammad Imdad Hussain Pirzada
- Department for Education URN: 122945 Tables
- Religious head: Muhammad Imdad Hussain Pirzada
- Gender: Co-education
- Website: www.alkaram.org

Jamia Al-Karam, (Arabic: جامعة الکرم) is an Islamic Studies College located in Eaton in 30-acre premises. The Darul Uloom is managed by Muhammad Imdad Hussain Pirzada.

== History ==
In 1995, Jamia Al-Karam relocated to its current site in Retford, Nottinghamshire. There, its founder, Shaykh Pirzada, launched a new initiative: the Al-Karam Secondary School. This boarding school offered education up to the GCSE level. The school consistently maintained a high standard of education and academic results, all while keeping fees at a level affordable to many families.

It imparts teaching of English, Maths and Science. In addition to providing the subjects of Arabic Language, Islamic Studies, and Urdu.

The institute has produced over 500 British Islamic scholars of whom 50 have further graduated from Al-Azhar University in Cairo, Egypt. The relationship between the two institutions goes back to 1951 when Justice Shaykh Muhammad Karam Shah Al-Azhari, after who Jamia Al-Karam is named, began his studies at Al-Azhar University under the tutelage of the great scholars of Al-Azhar including Ahmad Zaki, Mustafa Shibli and Muhammad Abu Zahra.

On Sunday, 15 May 2011, the United Kingdom Branch of the World Association for Al-Azhar Graduates (WAAG) and the Al-Azhar Contact Office in Great Britain was inaugurated at Jamia Al-Karam. This was attended by Timothy Winter from the University of Cambridge and Cambridge Muslim College, Nazir Ahmed, Baron Ahmed, Fayyaz Gafoor (COO, ARY Network) among others.

Gul Muhammad, Dean of Faculty & Senior lecturer at Jamia Al-Karam, appealed ISIS to release British hostage Alan Henning and urged the militants to not commit the 'worst condemnable sin' against Islam.

== Methodology ==
As per the vision of its founder, it was founded to cater for the educational and social needs of British Muslims.

Jamia Al-Karam teaches Dars-e-Nizami course and is affiliated to the oldest seat of Islamic learning, Al-Azhar University. It has gained affiliation with the University of Al-Azhar, and graduates of Jamia Al-Karam are offered admission into the third year of the Al-Azhar University's BA degree courses. It has produced more than 150 Imam's.

The institute manages Al-Ni'mah Nasheed Group which performs Islamic songs on various occasions, including at the time of Mawlid celebrations.

It serves as a centre for dialogue between various faiths & communities. Robert Jenrick, British Conservative Party politician and Member of Parliament (MP) for Newark, visited Jamia Al-Karam and appreciated the efforts of its founder.

== See also ==
- List of Islamic educational institutions
- Cambridge Muslim College
- Listed buildings in Eaton, Nottinghamshire
