= Karama =

Karama may refer to:

== Geography ==
- Al Karama, Dubai, UAE
- Al Karama, Syria (disambiguation)
- Electoral division of Karama, an electoral division in Australia
- Karama, Northern Territory, a suburb of Darwin, Australia
- Karama River, a river in Sulawesi, Indonesia
- Karama site, an Early Paleolithic paleoanthropological site in the Anuy River valley, Russia
- Karama, Nyagatare District, a sector in Nyagatare District, Rwanda
- Karama Huye District, a sector in the South West of Huye District, Southern Province, Rwanda

== Other uses ==
- Karama, an Arab world women's rights organisation founded in 2005 by Hibaaq Osman
- Karamat, miracles performed by Muslim saints

== See also ==
- Karamah (disambiguation)
- Karameh (disambiguation)
