= Kerimler =

Kerimler can refer to:

- Kerimler, Güney
- Kerimler, Mersin
