= Salam Karam =

Swedish journalist

Salam Kamel Karam (Arabic: سلام كامل كرم) (born 9 March 1975) is a Swedish journalist.

Salam Karam was born in Baghdad in Iraq. He speaks fluent Arabic as well as Swedish. He has a bachelor's degree in Middle-Eastern studies from Uppsala University. He has worked as a Middle East reporter for the newspaper Svenska Dagbladet and in the radio program Godmorgon, världen!. He has been noted for writing several articles exposing religious extremism and antisemitism among Sweden's Muslims.
