= Fares Souaid =

Lebanese politician

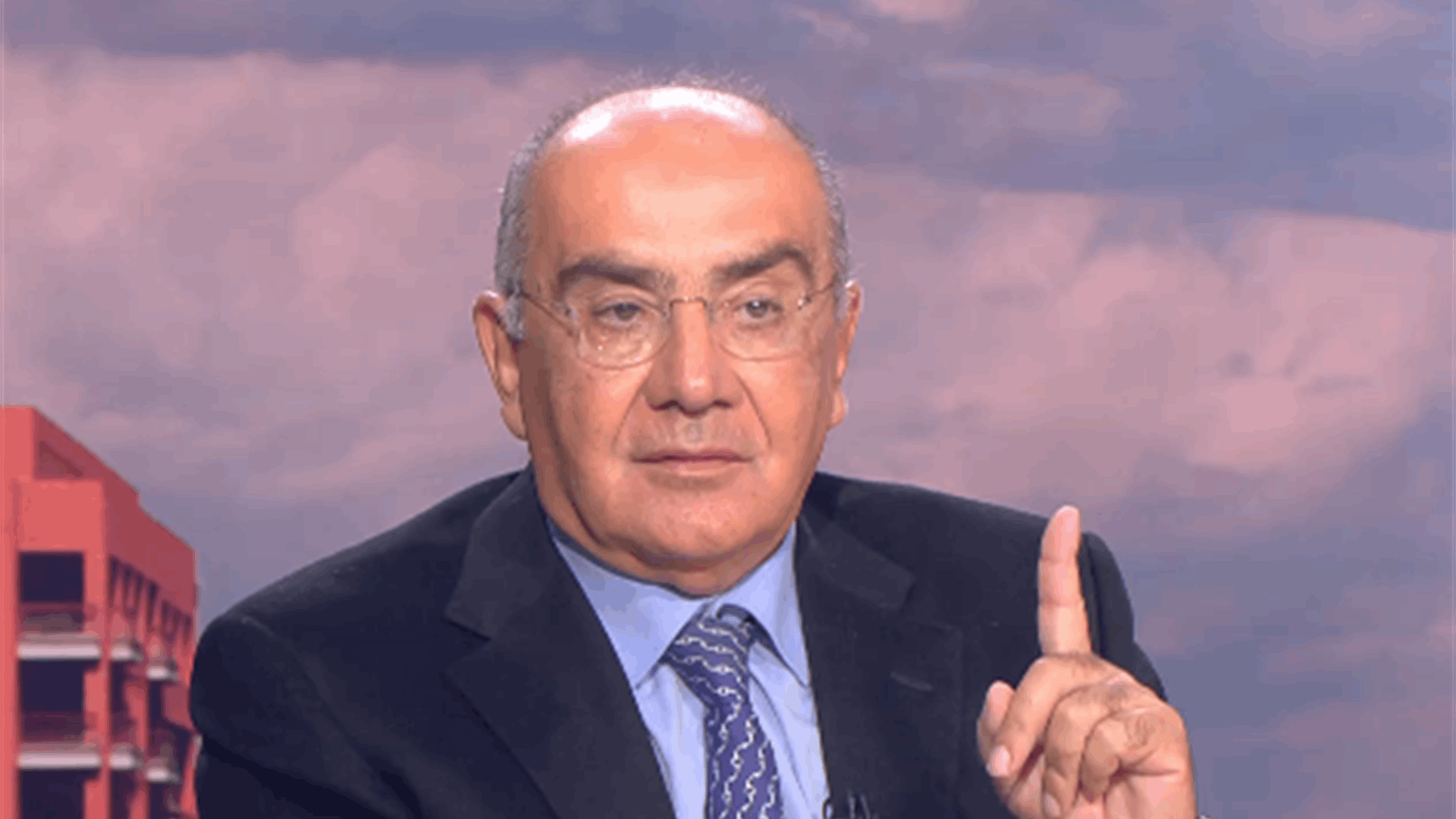
- Born: 1958 (age 67–68); Qartaba
- Education: Medicine
- Occupation: Politician
- Movement: March 14 Alliance

Dr. Fares Antoun Souaid (Arabic: فارس أنطون سعيد, born 1958, Qartaba) is a Lebanese Maronite politician, former MP and Secretariat General Coordinator of the March 14 Alliance, the movement behind the ending of the Syrian occupation of Lebanon in 2005.

== Biography ==
He was born in 1958 in the Qartaba village, in the Jbeil District.

During the 1975 Lebanese Civil War, he traveled to Paris to study medicine, before returning in 1989 to Lebanon to follow his family's political path, when he moved between several parties.

In 2000, he became a Member of Parliament.

With the return of President Michel Aoun from his exile in France in 2005, Aoun brought with him a huge political phenomenon which became known as the "tsunami", Souaid was unable to win in the elections of 2005 in the face of Aoun.

He assumed the task of Secretariat General Coordinator of the anti-Syrian occupation coalition of March 14 of 2005, which subsequently disintegrated a few years later.

In 2020, he has been known for his anti-Iran and Hezbollah influence in Lebanon stance.

In 2001, he became along with Samir Franjieh the most prominent member of the Qornet Chehwan Gathering, which opposed the extension of President Emile Lahoud's term.
