= Karim (disambiguation) =

Karim (also, Kareem or Kerim; Arabic: کریم) is a given name and a surname of Arabic origin. It may also refer to:

== Places ==
- Karim, Iran, a village in Kashkan Rural District, Shahivand District, Dowreh County, Lorestan Province, Iran
- Nahr-e Karim, a village in Nasar Rural District, Arvandkenar District, Abadan County, Khuzestan Province, Iran

== Other uses ==
- Karim (record label), Italian record label active from 1960 to 1966, when it closed
- Karim's, Indian restaurant chain headquartered in Delhi, India

== See also ==
- Careem, Middle Eastern ride share car hailing app company
- Karie (disambiguation)
- Kerim (name)
