= Al-Karamah, Tartus Governorate =

Al-Karamah الكرامة Sahyun
- Village
- Location in Syria
- Coordinates: 34°48′14″N 36°8′17″E
- Country: Syria
- Governorate: Tartus
- District: Safita
- Subdistrict: Safita

Al Karamah (Arabic: الكرامة, literally meaning dignity), or simply Karama or Karamah, formerly known as Sahyun, is a village in administrative division (nahiyah) of Safita in the Tartus Governorate of Syria.
