= Saddleworth Museum =

Museum in Greater Manchester, England

Saddleworth Museum and Gallery
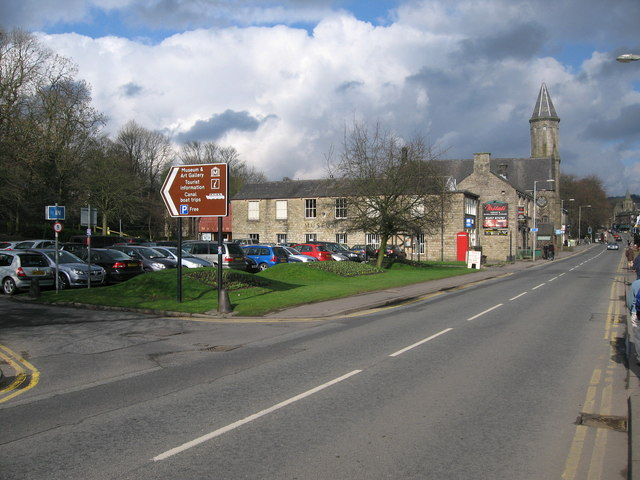
- Established: 1962
- Location: Uppermill, Saddleworth, Greater Manchester, England
- Coordinates: 53.5467924°N 2.0103235°W
- Founder: Roger Tanner
- Website: www.saddleworthmuseum.co.uk

The Saddleworth Museum is a local history museum in Uppermill, Saddleworth, Greater Manchester, England. Founded in 1962, the museum is housed in the remains of the 19th-century Victoria Mill and its collections showcase the history of Saddleworth.

== Founding and early history ==
In 1959 Roger Tanner purchased the derelict Victoria Mill. With the help of volunteers, the mill's sole remaining building was transformed into a museum dedicated to preserving the heritage of Saddleworth. The museum opened its doors to the public in 1962. Over the next two decades, the museum focused on expanding its collections, developing exhibits, and securing accreditation and charitable status. A board of trustees was formed to guide the museum's mission. In 1980 a successful public appeal campaign allowed the museum to expand and add a community gallery for art exhibitions and local events. This period also saw the museum establish partnerships with local organisations.

== Challenges and refurbishment ==
By 2010 the museum faced significant challenges, including dwindling public funding and the increasing strain of maintaining its aging infrastructure. In response, the museum opened its own visitor information center and launched a fundraising campaign. A successful grant application to the National Heritage Lottery Fund in 2014 allowed for a major refurbishment project. The project included significant improvements to the building's exterior and interior, including creating a modern reception area, fully refurbished galleries with high-tech and interactive exhibits, and dedicated learning spaces for children.

== Recent developments ==
On 20 March 2020, in response to the outbreak of the COVID-19 pandemic, the museum closed to the public. It reopened on 22 May 2021 with an upgraded website and social media presence. The online platform allows the museum to reach a wider audience and offer virtual experiences, online shopping, and ticketing options. Volunteers support the museum's operations, while the "Friends of the Saddleworth Museum and Gallery" group organises fundraising events and membership programmes. The museum remains financially sustainable through a combination of earned income (art gallery fees, admissions, shop sales, and educational programmes) and public donations.
