= Usin Kerim =

Bulgarian Romani poet (born 1929)

Usin Kerim (26 July 1929 – 8 June 1983) was a Bulgarian Romani poet. Kerim came to prominence in the genre of Romani poetry over the past decade.

He was born in 1929 by the banks of the River Vit in Bulgaria, and composed "Birth in the Encampment" and other poems.
