= Godmorgon, världen! =

- Country of origin: Sweden
- Language(s): Swedish
- Home station: SR P1
- Original release: 7 September 1986

Godmorgon, världen! ("Good morning, World!") is a long-running Swedish radio programme, broadcast on the Sveriges Radio channel P1 between 9 and 11 every Sunday morning since 1986. The programme covers the news of the last week with reports and interviews, includes a panel of selected Swedish media personalities who comment and debate recent events and issues, and a satirical show. Godmorgon, världen! were started on the initiative of Ove Joanson, then CEO of Sveriges Radio. It was based on several foreign models, but particularly the Canadian programme Sunday Morning (aired on CBC Radio One 1976–1997).

== See also ==
- Media in Sweden § Media bias
