= Korom, Iran =

Korom كرم
- Village
- Location within Iran
- Coordinates: 30°13′52″N 55°19′44″E
- Country: Iran
- Province: Kerman
- County: Shahr-e Babak
- Bakhsh: Central
- Rural District: Meymand

Population (2006)
  - Total: 327
- Time zone: UTC+3:30 (IRST)
  - Summer (DST): UTC+4:30 (IRDT)

Korom (Persian: كرم; also known as Kārām) is a village in Meymand Rural District, in the Central District of Shahr-e Babak County, Kerman Province, Iran. At the 2006 census, its population was 327, in 68 families.
