= Shadi A. Karam =

Lebanese businessperson (born 1948)

Shadi A. Karam (born 1948) is a Lebanese businessperson and banker. He is a pioneer in microcredit lending.

== Early life and education ==
Shadi A. Karam was born on September 16, 1948, in Lebanon. Karam received degrees from the American University of Beirut (AUB), Columbia University, and Harvard University.

== Career ==
In his primary professional capacity, he is known as a specialist in the restructuring of organizations and distressed companies, most notably occupying the post of Financial Adviser to the Director General of UNESCO and serving as a Chairman and CEO of several major companies in Europe and the Middle East in various sectors, ranging from industry to real estate development, hotels, trading and financial services.

Karam was the lead principal in the restructuring and modernization of the Real Estate Bank of Syria, a State-owned bank, in 1996-1997 and the successful turn around of Lebanon's BLC Bank, one of the major commercial banks of Lebanon which had to be taken over by the Central Bank of Lebanon in 2002. He also played a key role in the modernization of the banking sector in Syria in general, its liberalization and its opening to international financial markets - an effort he was able to press further as CEO of Souria Holdings, the second largest investment company in the country and the first in Syria to implement the Public Private Partnership model. He resigned from Souria Holding and left Syria in 2010 in the very early phases of the Syrian unrest which turned into the Syria's internal strife. Some critics have argued, however, that despite the multiple efforts of Syrian, Lebanese and foreign institutions like the EU, the economic reforms introduced by President Bashar Al-Assad in the early years of his ascension as head of state in 2000 have had a far more limited impact than promised and may have even precipitated the unrest and protests that began in the Spring of 2011 and later developed into the Syrian Civil War.

== Teaching and leadership roles ==
Among other aspects of his career, he has taught Economics, Finance and Banking at several universities, such as Harvard University, The University of Southern Europe, and the Institut des Etudes Politiques – IEP. He was the Chairman of ASTRO Bank, Cyprus, formerly known as Piraeus Bank, which he resigned from in December 2021 He is also the Vice Chairman of the International Chamber of Commerce Lebanon national committee.

Prior to this role, Karam served as the Special Adviser to the President of the Republic of Lebanon, Michel Suleiman for the duration of his six-year mandate and as Senior Adviser to Prime Minister Tammam Salam during the critical period of presidential vacancy in the country, 25 May 2014 to 31 October 2016. In this post, he launched a National Sustainable Development Strategy - acting as the national focal point for the Syrian refugee issue - and oversaw international relations for the Office of the Prime Minister. Karam also served as the Adviser to the Deputy Prime Minister in charge of Economic Affairs of the Arab Republic of Syria, Mr. Abdullah Dardari, entrusted with driving the Public Private Partnership initiative in the country. Dardari served thereafter as the Senior Advisor on Reconstruction for the Middle East and North Africa at the World Bank and is now a United Nations Development Program (UNDP) Representative.

A patron of the arts and of his alma mater AUB, Karam was a member of the Board of Trustees of the Holy Spirit University Kaslik until August 2025 and is now Senior Vice President of the University and in this role the second highest ranking executive of the institution. He was also until June 2025 the President of the Association Libanaise pour le Développement du Mécénat Culturel and holds several decorations, including the Grand Officer of the Spanish Order of Isabella the Catholic, Commander of the Greek Order of the Phoenix and Commander of the Lebanese Order of the Cedar. Karam is married with three children, one girl and two boys.

== BLC turnaround ==
In 2002, the Banque du Liban (BDL) took control of BLC after bad management pushed the BLC to the edge of bankruptcy. The prospects for a turnaround were widely thought to be grim, with the Central Bank expected to, at best, protect deposits. However, Riad Salameh, governor of the BDL, was determined to develop a plan to rebuild the bank and return it to profitability in Lebanon’s renowned and competitive banking sector. Accordingly, over the next three years he brought in a dynamic management team led by Karam, who already had a great deal of international experience having also worked for several years in the 1990s as a leading banker at Merrill Lynch. Karam was reportedly concerned about BLC’s fundamentals at first, telling the business magazine Executive: "The bank had a very high negative net worth. The level of accumulated net losses was historic plus... there were dramatic structural problems.” In late 2005, after successfully implementing a plan developed by Karam and approved by Salameh, the BDL decided to sell BLC. Initial reports said that Salemeh was hoping for a $150 million price tag, but bidding began at $165 million. The highest offer, however, came in at $236.37 million for a 96% stake from the High Supreme Council for Qatari Economic Affairs and Investment, which later became known as the Qatar Investment Authority. The BDL recovered all of the central bank’s investments and made a substantial profit of $90 million.

== Opposition to efforts ==
Karam has been described as a leading, un-traditional Lebanese banker not only because he has international work experience in the field of finance, but also because he is politically and financially independent - something that Karam argues "protected [me] from being pressured or blackmailed by pressure groups and political parties, unlike other Lebanese bankers who are being criticized and attacked because of that fact." Although he was the subject of defamation campaigns, lawsuits and personal threats, he was able to avoid the pressure traditionally placed on business leaders in the country by politicians because he imposed on the Central Bank head Salameh to allow him complete autonomy in restructuring the troubled company.

== Microcredit pioneer ==
In 2004, Karam led BLC bank to become the first bank in the country to provide micro credit loans to small businesses. The Spanish microfinance cooperation program provided €4 million for the effort initially, which directly injected much needed liquidity “directly into the veins of the economy,” as Karam put it at the time. “[Since] the success of this initiative depends on providing cheap financing to the micro-enterprises, it is imperative for the lending institution (BLC) to source out funds at low rates. For this reason, the management of BLC turned to outside funding agencies as costs of funds outside Lebanon are currently cheaper than the local market,” explained the bank’s press release.

== Lebanon's Debt warnings ==
In 2008, Karam wrote a series of articles in the local and regional media laying out Lebanon's unsustainable debt situation (currently pegged at over 160% of debt to GDP) and recommending ways to deal with the looming crisis head on. "It is recognized that the public debt," he wrote, "is one of the most crucial problems that Lebanon faces today. More important than security considerations, it is susceptible, if mismanaged, to cause damage to the country's basic foundations far more lasting than burnt buildings and regrettable life loss. It is also likely to become itself a source of turbulence." Karam explained further that the country has been "on the brink of disaster for several years and were it not for the steps taken by the governor of the central bank, today and in past years, little would have been done to avoid the collapse." Such steps, he argued, "are cosmetic and their purpose is to avoid an immediate crisis and buy time for true reform and fundamental structural fiscal measures to be conceived and implemented. Financial engineering has never replaced sound policy."

Karam decried the lack of care or concern evinced by "political circles," asking, "What better illustration of the adage that if you owe a little sum you lose sleep over it but if you owe millions, it is your banker who loses sleep over it. He also criticized his own industry, Lebanese banks, for being slow to reform themselves and to implement new Basel II regulations, a rare move by an insider for an insular sector.

In several op-eds later in the year, he called for a series of controversial structural reforms, saying that as a first matter, Lebanon "needs to address the Treasury's financial priorities by starting to implement existing solutions to the problem of Electricite du Liban, thus tackling one of the main chunks of the budget deficit. Showing determination in this area will encourage the implementation of Paris III and maybe convince donors" not only to deflect assistance from specific projects to direct and indirect unconditional budget support, but also to "accelerate the pace of their payments."

== 'Umma' currency ==
Noting that inter-Arab trade volumes are much more modest than they should be, Karam has argued that the reasons for this are "principally the lack of extensive distribution networks, the absence of comprehensive trade agreements that go beyond the existing accords and the fact that transactions have to go through the US dollar." As such, Karam has become one of the leading voices in the Arab Middle East calling for a common currency. "The pegging to the US dollar of most of the major currencies in the region will facilitate the technical engineering of the process," he says. "This currency could be named the Umma, with reference to the unattainable dream of a unified Arab nation."

Admitting that there are some potential pitfalls, Karam nevertheless has challenged policymakers and financial analysts alike to "imagine oil barrels partially priced in Umma. Imagine Arab and foreign tourists paying hotels and restaurant bills in one currency all over the Arab world... Imagine an Umma resting solidly on the foundation of a multi trillion economy fueled by three hundred million consumers. Finally, imagine the economic and political convergence this will inevitably generate. Imagine ... But, is it not the lack of imagination our worst endemic disease?"

== Economic reforms in Syria ==
In 2007, Karam, urged the Syrian authorities to implement several measures to enhance the role of the central bank and improve the performance of commercial banks in the country, most notably via a lecture he delivered entitled “Issues and the Future of Syrian Banks” before an audience of prominent Syrian businessmen, bankers and politicians at the Four Seasons Hotel in Damascus. Karam stressed the need for the full independence of the central bank and its total control over exchange rate management, monetary policy and banking supervision to put a stop to the interference of the Ministry of Finance in the banking sector and the role of the Commercial Bank of Syria (CBOS) in exchange markets. Although most of these reforms were subsequently implemented, some critics argue that deeper reforms will be necessary if Syria is to emerge from the decades of state-owned, authoritarianism that has, in part, created long-term systemic risks for the country.
