= Md. Keramat Ali =

Pakistani Bengali entrepreneur

Danbir Alhaj Moulvi Mohammad Keramat Ali
- মোহাম্মদ কেরামত আলী

Member of the East Pakistan Legislative Assembly
- In office 1954–1954
- Monarch: Elizabeth II
- Governor-General: Ghulam Muhammad
- Prime Minister: Mohammad Ali Bogra

Member of the National Assembly of Pakistan
- In office 1965–1969
- President: Ayub Khan, Yahya Khan
- Preceded by: Abdul Muntaquim Chaudhury
- Constituency: Sylhet-III

Personal details
- Born: 1901 Bade Sonapur, Bhanugach, Moulvibazar, Sylhet district, British Raj
- Died: November 3, 1969 (aged 67–68) Dacca, East Pakistan
- Resting place: Keramatnagar, Kamalganj Upazila, Moulvibazar District, Bangladesh
- Party: Krishan League; Krishak Sramik Party; Convention Muslim League
- Spouse: Zulaykha Khatun
- Children: 3 sons and 4 daughters [[Md. Muhibur Rahman]]

Mohammad Keramat Ali (Bengali: মোহাম্মদ কেরামত আলী) was a Pakistani Bengali entrepreneur, philanthropist and politician. He was a member of the 4th National Assembly of Pakistan as a representative of East Pakistan.

== Early life and background ==
Ali was born into a Bengali Muslim family in the village of Bade Sonapur in Kamalganj, Moulvibazar, Sylhet district, of the British Raj's Assam Province in 1901 CE. His mother's name was Mosammat Maryam Bibi and his father, Muhammad Shafat Ali, was a Moulvi and is the person who the Shafat Ali Senior Fazil Madrasa is named after. Out of his seven siblings, Ali was the eldest.

Ali completed his primary education at the school in his village before proceeding to study at a junior high school up until class six. In addition to Bengali, Ali also learnt Arabic, Persian and Urdu from his local maktab and earned the title of Maulvi.

== Business career ==
Between 1930 and 1932, Ali started a drainage divide (bash and tree) business with little capital. He succeeded in making enviable profits through self-employment in this business. The business-scope gradually expanded and following this, he purchased most of the drainage divides in the Juri Range, Rajkandi Range and Raghunandan Range from the Government of East Pakistan's Forest Department. This resulted in him starting businesses with the jute, tea, bricks, fuel, machinery and materials within the ranges.

The success of his business led to the establishment of the Keramatnagar Industries Corporation (KIC), from which he supplied various materials across East Pakistan, West Pakistan and globally. He set up jute, bash and tree offices at various places; notably in Narayanganj (head office), Manumukh, Ashuganj, Tamakpatti and Fandauk. He exported jute as far as Dundee in the United Kingdom, and to numerous jute mills such as the Adamjee Jute Mills. He worked tirelessly for the enrichment of various trade and export sectors including the industrial, agricultural and jute sectors of the erstwhile Government of Pakistan. As part of this work, he officially visited more than seventeen countries around the world. As a result, he tried to gain a good reputation in the outside world at that time; And this is how he presents himself to the outside world as a successful entrepreneur.

== Political career ==
Ali was a prominent political figure of Pakistan. He founded the Krishan League party in 1945 alongside former minister Jasim Uddin. He represented the Krishan League in the 1946 legislative elections but was defeated by the opposition. For some time thereafter, he discreetly observed the volatile political situation.

With the growth of the Bengali language movement, Ali returned to the political scene to express his support and was noticed by A. K. Fazlul Huq. The two politicians developed a friendly relationship, and Ali would refer to him as Dadabhai as a mark of respect. He played a key role in the establishment of Huq's Krishak Sramik Party. In the 1954 East Bengal Legislative Assembly election, Ali represented the Krishak Sramik Party as part of the United Front coalition. He was successful and became a member of the Legislative Assembly though a state of emergency was declared by the central Pakistani authorities on 24 October 1954 effectively abolishing the United Front government. Ali and 34 other United Front leaders and activists such as Sheikh Mujibur Rahman were arrested and sent to jail. They were released on 6 June 1955.

After the transfer of power to Ayub Khan, the panchayat system was abolished, local union councils were formed through the Basic Democracy initiative, and the system of electing representatives at the national level by voting for the elected representatives of the Union Parishad was introduced. Ali did not contest in this election and gave the opportunity to his eldest son, Danbir Md Muhibur Rahman Chiragh Ali to contest. As a result, his son became the elected chairman of Kamalganj Union Parishad No. 5 in 1960 and a member of the Assembly in 1962.

Ali developed a closer relationship with the President of Pakistan Ayub Khan and subsequently joined the Convention Muslim League. He represented this party in the 1965 elections competing for the Sylhet-III constituency against Begum Serajunnessa Choudhury and Nawab Ali Safdar Khan. Ali won the local elections and §became a Member of the 4th National Assembly of Pakistan. At that time, Pakistan had the opportunity to play an important role in various important domestic and international affairs. Ali was able to work simultaneously with the Governor of East Pakistan, Abdul Monem Khan, especially for the overall development of the neglected East Pakistan.

== Notable activities ==
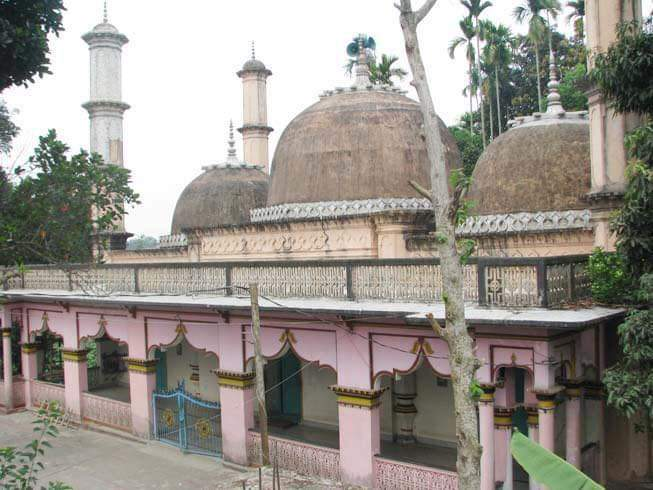
The Keramat Ali Jame Mosque pays homage to Mughal architecture.

- Moulvibazar Government College; gave ৳75,000 financial support and established a science building.
- Sreemangal Government College; ৳25,000 financial cooperation and leading role
- Safat Ali Senior Fazil Madrasah; founder
- Keramatnagar-3221 post-office in Kamalganj; founder
- Keramat Ali Jame Mosque in Kamalganj; founder

== Death ==
Ali died on 3 November 1969. He was buried next to the Hifz Building of his established Safat Ali Senior Fazil Madrasah on 6 November.
