= Isabel Allende Karam =

Cuban diplomat

Isabel Allende Karam is a Cuban diplomat, ambassador, and former translator. She now works as the rector of the ISRI, Instituto Superior de Relaciones Internacionales of Cuba.

== Biography ==
Allende studied in Czechoslovakia at the Charles University in Prague and worked for both the Cuban Cultural Center in Prague and the Cuban embassy in Czechoslovakia.

She was Fidel Castro's translator during his trip to Prague, desk officer for Czechoslovakia (1969–70) at MINREX (Cuba's foreign ministry), then director of its department for Central European socialist countries, Cuba's ambassador to Poland (1988–91), Spain (1999–2000) and Russia. In 1996 she was Deputy Foreign Minister, in which capacity she took part in the negotiations leading to Pope John Paul II's 1998 visit to Cuba.

== Personal life ==
Allende's husband is a Cuban writer. She speaks both Spanish and Czech.
