= Tarapasha High School and College =

Educational institution in Moulvibazar, Sylhet, Bangladesh

- তারাপাশা উচ্চ বিদ্যালয় ও কলেজ
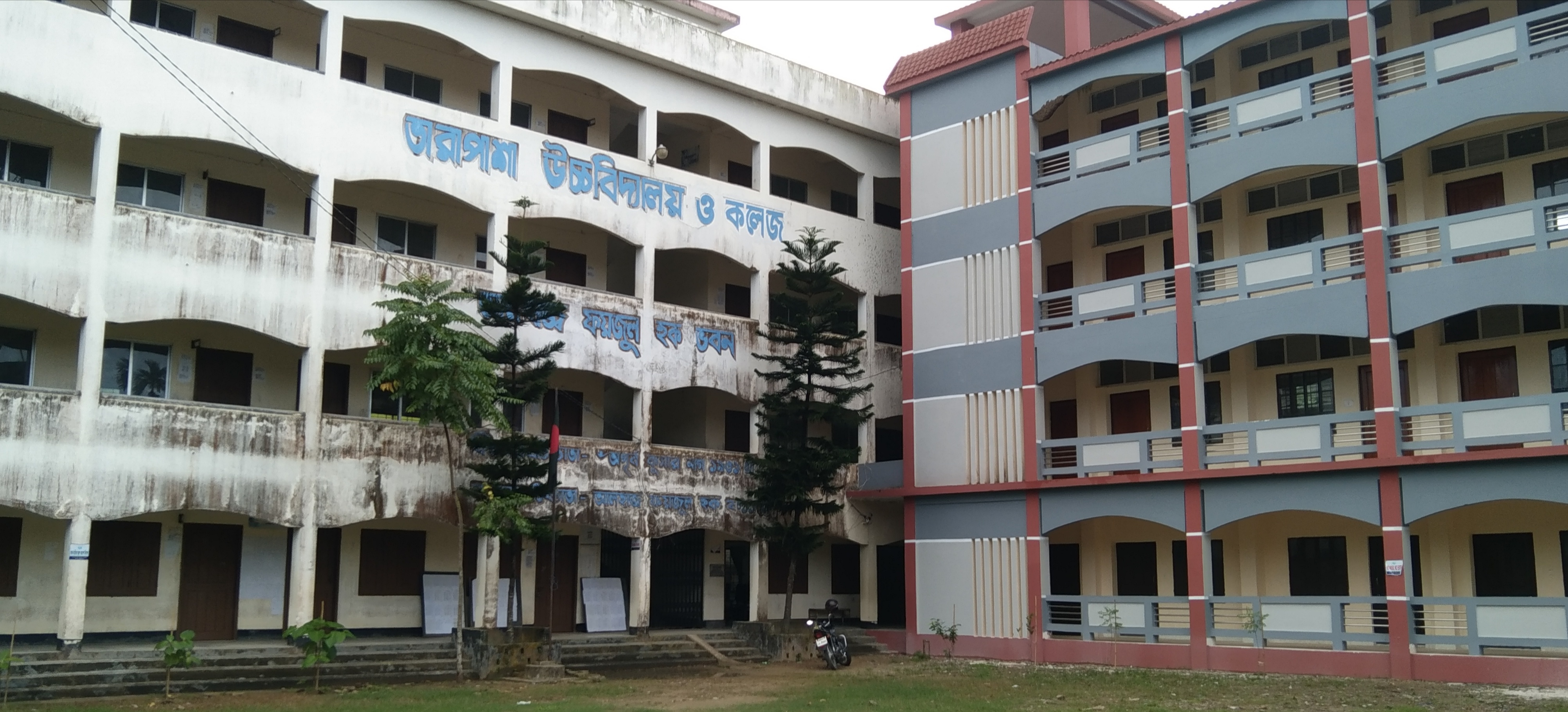
- Buildings

Location
- Tarapasha, Kamarchak Union, Rajnagar Upazila, Moulvibazar District; Bangladesh
- Coordinates: 24.4827°N 91.8917°E

Information
- Type: School and College
- Established: School: 1931; 95 years ago College: 2011; 15 years ago
- Founder: Apurba Kumar Nag, Alhaj Faizul Haque
- School code: School Code - 2302; College Code - 2382; EIIN - 129738
- Principal: Mohammad Rahim Khan
- Gender: co-ed
- Classes: 6th to 12th
- Language: Bengali
- Board: Sylhet Education Board
- Website: tarapashahsc.edu.bd

Tarapasha High School and College (Bengali: তারাপাশা উচ্চ বিদ্যালয় ও কলেজ) is a higher secondary educational institution located in Rajnagar Upazila, Moulvibazar District, Bangladesh. It was established in 1931. It is an MPO listed educational institution.

== History ==
Tarapasha High School and College was established in 1931.

In 2022, the college part of this institution came under the Monthly Pay Order (MPO) facility.

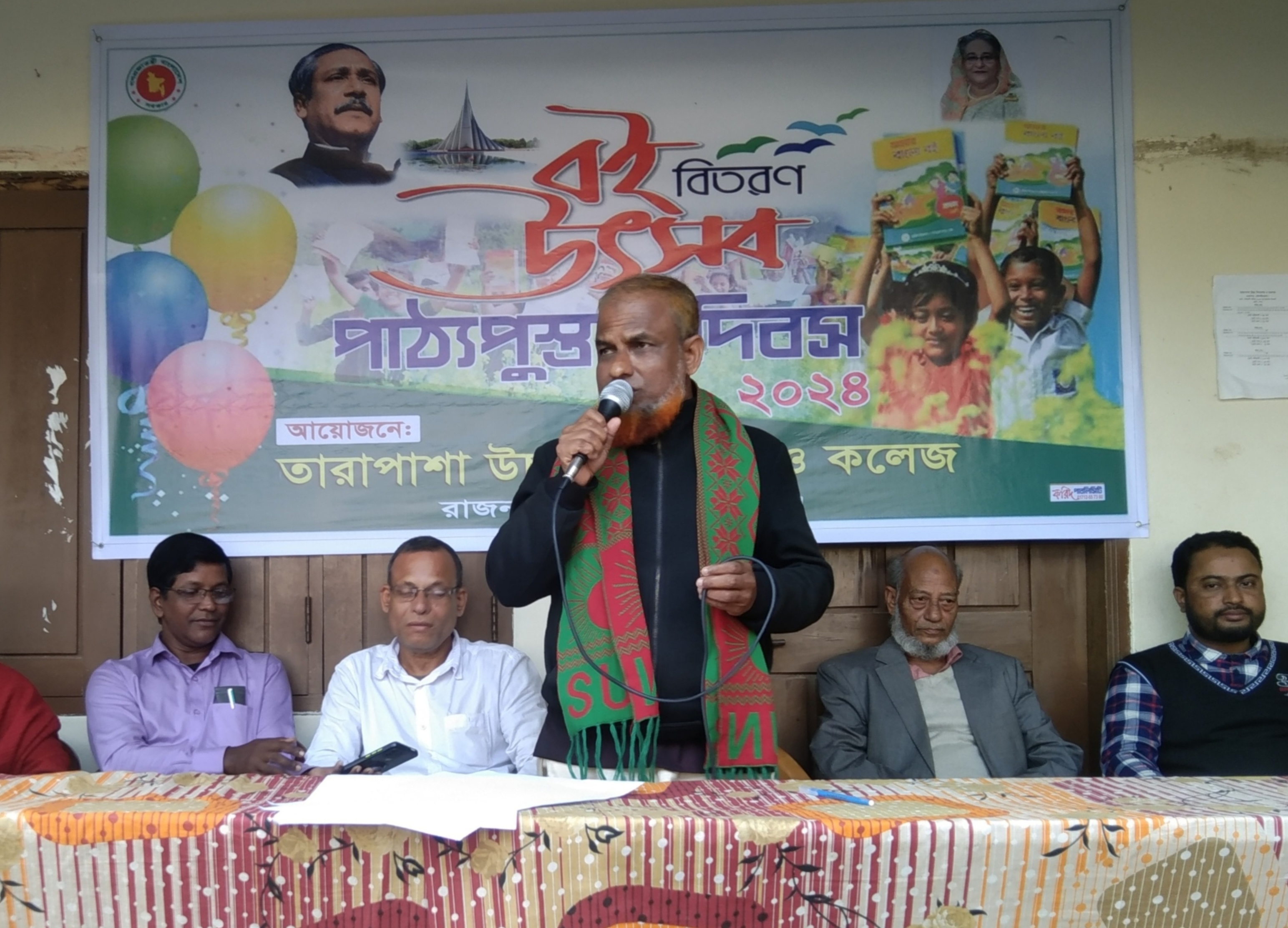
Book distribution program 2024

== Academics ==
Teaching is done in Bengali. The institution has two parts:

- Junior Secondary and Secondary (6th to 10th Class)
- College (Class XI & XII)

== See also ==
- A.A.T.M. Multilateral High School
- Kamalganj Government Gano Mahabidyalay
- Moulvibazar Government College
