= Moulvibazar Government College =

College in Sylhet, Bangladesh

- মৌলভীবাজার সরকারি কলেজ

Location
- Court road, Moulvibazar; Bangladesh; 24.480°N 91.779°E

Information
- Type: Government funded college
- Established: 1956; 70 years ago
- School board: Sylhet Education Board
- School code: College Code-2001; EIIN-129730
- Principal: Md. Monsur Alamgir
- Nickname: MBGC
- Affiliations: National University
- Website: mbgc.gov.bd

Moulvibazar Government College (Bengali: মৌলভীবাজার সরকারি কলেজ) is a government college located in Moulvibazar District, Sylhet Division, Bangladesh. It was established in 1956.

== Academics ==
Moulvibazar Government College offers higher secondary certificate, bachelor's degrees (pass), honours and post graduate courses in various subjects.

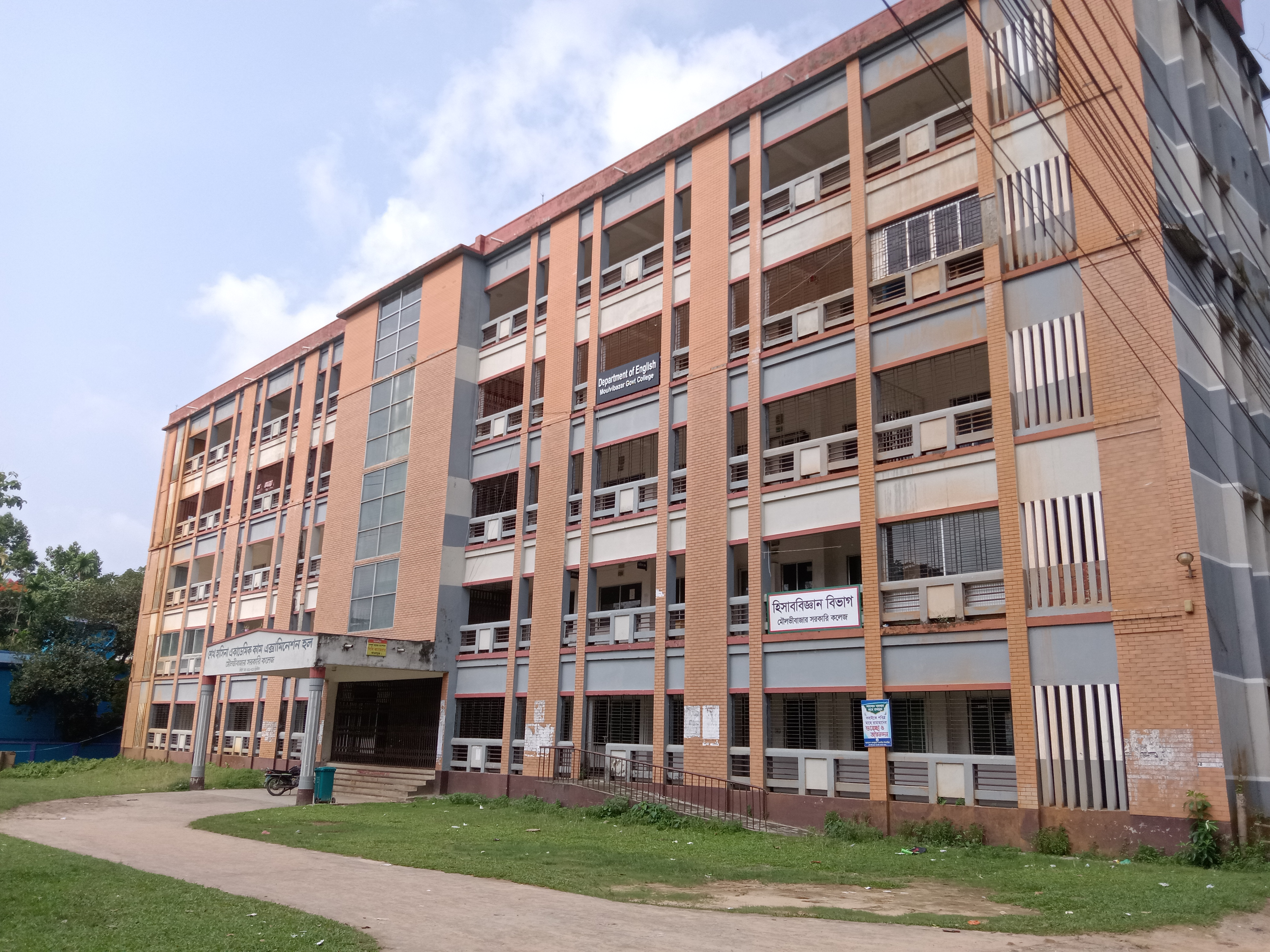
Sheikh Hasina Academic Cum Examination Hall, Moulvibazar Government College

=== Bachelor Degree (Pass) Courses ===
- B. A. (Pass)
- B. S. S. (Pass)
- B.Sc. (Pass)
- B. B. S. (Pass)

=== Bachelor Degree (Honours) Courses ===
- Bengali
- English
- History
- Islamic History and Culture
- Philosophy
- Political Science
- Economics
- Accounting
- Management
- Physics
- Chemistry
- Botany
- Zoology
- Mathematics

=== Master's Final Courses ===
- Bengali
- English
- History
- Islamic History and Culture
- Philosophy
- Islamic Studies
- Political Science
- Sociology
- Economics
- Accounting
- Management
- Physics
- Chemistry
- Botany
- Zoology
- Mathematics

=== Master's Preliminary Courses ===
- Political Science
- Economics
- Accounting

=== Extracurricular activities ===
- Physical Education Department

== See also ==
- Moulvibazar Sadar Upazila
- Moulvibazar District
- National University, Bangladesh
- Education in Bangladesh
