= Mohammad Zillur Rahman =

Bangladeshi politician (born 1978)

- মোহাম্মদ জিল্লুর রহমান
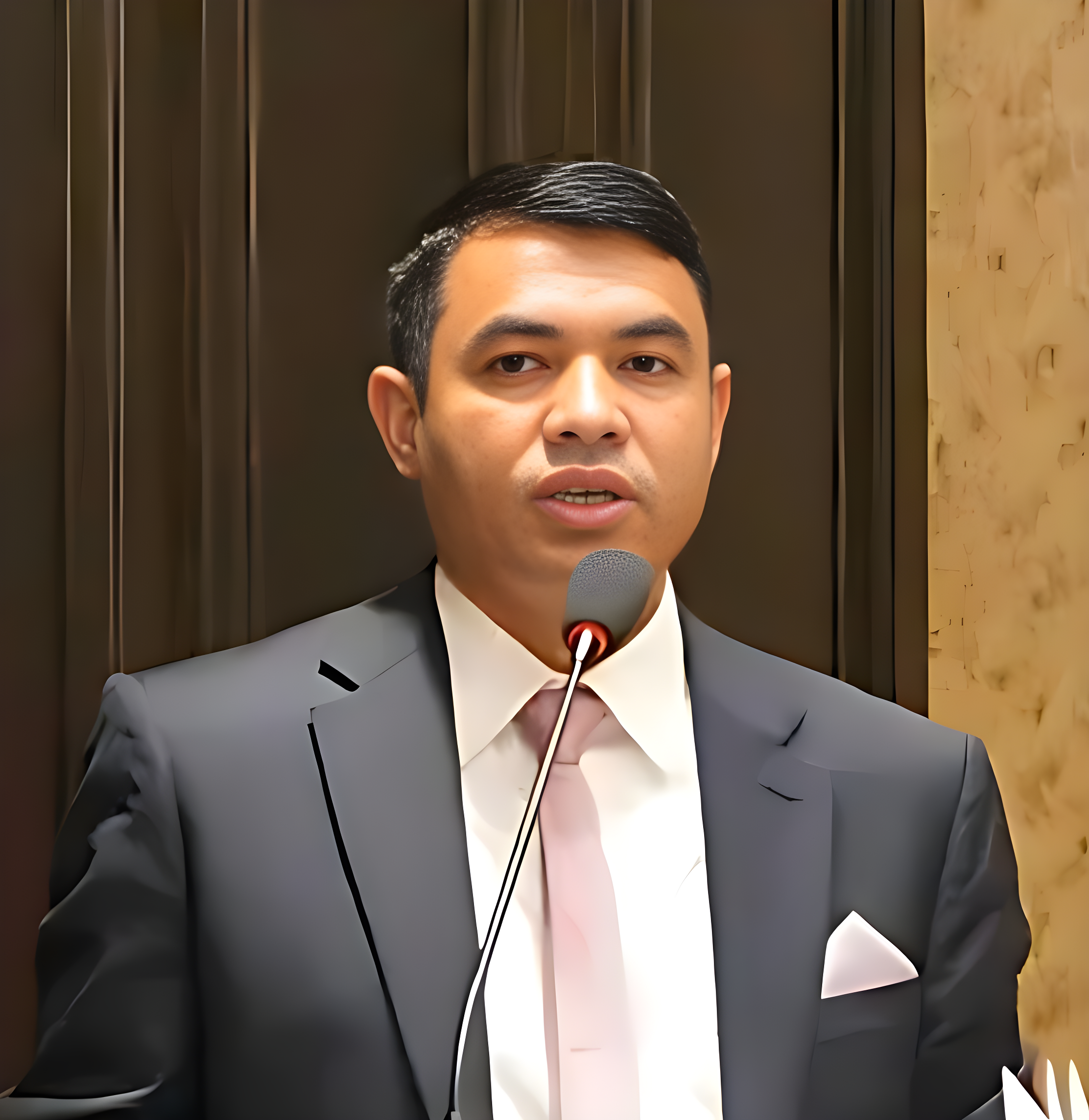

Member of the Bangladesh Parliament for Moulvibazar-3
- In office 10 January 2024 – 6 August 2024
- Preceded by: Nesar Ahmed
- Succeeded by: M. Naser Rahman

Personal details
- Born: 17 September 1978 (age 48) Tarapasha, Rajnagar, Moulvibazar, Bangladesh
- Party: Bangladesh Awami League
- Spouse: Hasina Nahid
- Children: 2
- Website: mdzillurrahman.com

Mohammad Zillur Rahman (born 17 September 1978) is a Bangladeshi industrialist and politician. He is a former Jatiya Sangsad member representing the Moulvibazar-3 constituency in 2024. He is also the Managing Director of Olila Group.

== Early life ==
Zillur Rahman was born on 17 September 1978 in Tarapasha, Rajnagar, Moulvibazar. His father's name is Abdul Mosabbir, who was the former chairman of Kamarchak Union Parishad.

== Career ==
Rahman is a businessman. He is the Managing Director of Olila Group (Olila Glassware), a glass manufacturing company in Bangladesh. He is also a director of Viva Creations. He is the president of Abahani Supporters Forum and the founder of Sheikh Russell Indoor Stadium. He was a president of the governing body of Tarapasha High School and College.

== Politics ==
Rahman is a Bangladesh Awami League politician. He became the nominated candidate of Awami League from Moulvibazar-3 constituency in the 12th National Parliament election. He won the election on 7 January 2024.

== Personal life ==
Rahman is married to Hasina Nahid, Chairman of Olila Group and Managing Director of Viva Creations. The couple has two daughters, Zarin Tasnim Abonthy and Olila Tasnim Orthy.
