= Syed Mohsin Ali =

Bangladeshi politician (1948–2015)

- সৈয়দ মহসিন আলী
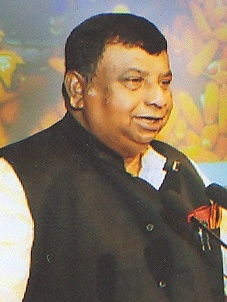
- Ali in 2015

Minister of Social Welfare
- In office 12 January 2014 – 14 September 2015
- Preceded by: Enamul Haque Mostafa Shahid
- Succeeded by: Nuruzzaman Ahmed

Member of the Bangladesh Parliament for Moulvibazar-3
- In office 25 January 2009 – 14 September 2015
- Preceded by: Naser Rahman
- Succeeded by: Syeda Saira Mohsin

President Moulvibazar District Awami League
- In office 1998–2005
- Preceded by: Azizur Rahman
- Succeeded by: Md. Abdus Shahid

Personal details
- Born: 12 December 1948 Sylhet, East Bengal, Pakistan
- Died: 14 September 2015 (aged 66) Singapore General Hospital, Singapore
- Party: Bangladesh Awami League
- Spouse: Syeda Saira Mohsin
- Occupation: politician
- Awards: Independence Day Award

Syed Mohsin Ali (12 December 1948 – 14 September 2015) was a Bangladeshi politician. He served as the Member of Parliament from Moulvibazar-3 and the Social Welfare Minister of the government of Bangladesh. He was given Independence Day Award in 2017 by the government of Bangladesh.

== Early life ==
Ali began his education in Kolkata. He passed Junior Cambridge and Senior Cambridge from St. Xavier's College. Then he studied in Bengali medium for some days in Bangladesh. Then again he completed diploma in management from Kolkata.

== Career ==
Ali started his politics as a Bangladesh Chhatra League activist. He served as the president of the Moulvibazar unit of Awami League during 1998–2005. He was elected as the municipality's chairman three times. He fought the Liberation War as a commander of the Mukti Bahini under General MAG Osmani and was a member of the central committee of Sector Commanders Forum. He was a member of the National Freedom Fighters' Council and a central committee member of the Sector Commanders' Forum.

== Personal life ==
Ali was married to Syeda Saira Mohsin, also a Member of Parliament.

== Death ==
Ali died on 12 January 2015 in Singapore. He is buried next to his parents in the graveyard next to Dargah-e-Shah Mustafa.
