= Kamalganj Government Gano Mahabidyalay =

College in Moulvibazar, Sylhet, Bangladesh

- কমলগঞ্জ সরকারি গণ-মহাবিদ্যালয়

Location
- Kamalganj, Moulvibazar; Bangladesh

Information
- Other names: Kamalganj Govt. College; Kamalganj Govt. Gano College; Kamalganj Degree College; Kamalganj Gano Mohabidalay; Kamalganj Gano Mahavidyalaya
- Type: Government funded college
- Established: 1972; 54 years ago
- School code: College Code-2005; EIIN-129615
- Principal: Meherun Nesa
- Affiliations: National University
- Board: Sylhet Education Board
- Website: www.kgmb.edu.bd

Kamalganj Government Gano Mahabidyalay (Bengali: কমলগঞ্জ সরকারি গণ-মহাবিদ্যালয়) is a government college located in Kamalganj Upazila, Moulvibazar District, Bangladesh. It was established in 1972. This institution earlier started only as a higher secondary institution, but now it offers B.A. (Pass) and B.A. (Honours) courses.

== Location ==
Kamalganj Government Gano Mahabidyalay is located half a kilometer east of Kamalganj Upazila Parishad on Sreemangal-Kamalganj Road.

== History ==
Kamalganj Gano Mahabidyalay was established in 1972 by Mohammad Elias. This college became government in 2018.

== Academics ==
Kamalganj Government Gano Mahabidyalay offers Higher Secondary Certificate, Bachelor's degree (Pass), Honours courses in various subjects.

=== Bachelor Degree (Pass) Courses ===
- B. A. (Pass)
- B. S. S. (Pass)
- B. B. S. (Pass)

=== Bachelor Degree (Honours) Courses ===
- Bengali
- Management
