= Syeda Saira Mohsin =

Bangladeshi politician

Member of Parliament for (Moulvibazar-3)
- In office 8 December 2015 – 30 December 2018
- Preceded by: Syed Mohsin Ali
- Succeeded by: Nesar Ahmed

Personal details
- Born: 10 September 1960 (age 65)
- Party: Bangladesh Awami League
- Spouse: Syed Mohsin Ali

Syeda Saira Mohsin (born 10 September 1960) is a Bangladesh Awami League politician and former member of parliament in Bangladesh.

== Career ==
Mohsin was nominated by the Bangladesh Awami League to contest the by-election to Moulvibazar-3 constituency in Rajnagar Upazila and Moulvibazar Sadar Upazila of Moulvibazar District. The seat had fallen vacant after the death of her husband, Syed Mohsin Ali, on 14 September 2015. The nomination was approved by Prime Minister Sheikh Hasina. She won the election uncontested after Bangladesh Election Commission scrapped the candidacy of all her opponents. She was sworn into office by the Speaker of the Parliament Shirin Sharmin Chaudhury on 7 December 2015.

== Personal life ==
Mohsin was married to Bangladesh Awami League politician Syed Mohsin Ali. Her husband was the minister of social welfare. Her husband died on 14 September 2015. In 2017, she received the Independence Day Award on behalf of her late husband who received it posthumously for his role in the Bangladesh Liberation war.
