= Gita Kanu =

Bangladeshi trade unionist (born 1980)

Gita Rani Kanu (Bengali: গীতা রানী কানু; born c. 1980) is a Bangladeshi trade unionist known for her support of tea workers in Sylhet. She is the convenor of the Bangladesh Tea Worker Women's Forum, general secretary of the Cha Sramik Moha Sangram Committee, and member secretary of Cha Sramik Adhikar Andolon.

== Early life and education ==
Kanu was born around 1980 in Kurma, a tea plantation in Kamalganj Upazila, Sylhet. She was the fourth of six children born to a shop-owner and plantation worker father and a housewife mother. Kanu studied at Islampur PNP High School; after finishing her studies, she started working at her family's shop.

== Activism ==
Kanu became known as an activist for the rights of tea workers, including organising local workers and publicly demanding land rights, increased daily wages, and union democracy, including tea workers being able to elect union representatives; she called for reform of the official tea workers' union. Kanu became the convenor of the Bangladesh Tea Worker Women's Forum, as well as secretary of both Cha Sramik Moha Sangram Committee (lit. 'Tea Workers' Grand Struggle Committee') and Cha Sramik Adhikar Andolon (lit. 'Tea Workers' Rights Movement').

In 2014, Kanu ran for the position of woman vice chairperson of the Kamalganj Upazila Government Council, without the support of her family. After losing the election, she moved to India for a time, before returning to Bangladesh to further advocate for tea worker rights. In 2024, Kanu stood as a candidate for chairperson of Kamalganj Upazila Government Council; she was the only female candidate, and the first tea worker to contest a local government election. The other two candidates were both members of the Awami League, including the incumbent chairperson, Rafiqur Rahman, and Imtiaz Ahmed, the brother of Md. Abdus Shahid, the former minister of agriculture.

=== 2026 protest and arrest ===
On 31 August 2026, Kanu organised a human chain of tea workers in Chowmuhona, Sreemangal Upazila, as part of her ongoing campaign calling for a daily wage of 500 BDT for tea workers; the protest was permitted by local authorities. Due to worsening rain, following the chain, demonstrators decided to march towards the offices of the Upazila Nirbahi Officer to deliver a memorandum of their demands. During the procession, they were reportedly attacked by members of the Tea Workers' Union, the official trade union of tea workers, who torn down their banners and caused injuries to 10 to 12 protesters, including Kanu. Kanu and two others required medical treatment at Moulvibazar Sadar Hospital in Moulvibazar Sadar Upazila; they were discharged the following day. Protesters claimed that they had video footage of trade unionists attacking the protesters, and that the police did nothing to prevent the attack.

While Kanu was in hospital, Nipen Pal, the general secretary of the Tea Workers' Union, filed a criminal complaint alleging that Kanu and others had committed "unlawful assembly, caused hurt, theft, mischief causing damage, criminal intimidation, and abetment", illegal under the Penal Code of Bangladesh. Pal denied that members of his union had attacked the protesters and claimed Kanu had led an attack on their offices, though he said that there was no working CCTV in the building. Kanu stated that Pal had fraudulently made the complaint to harass her and other reformist trade unionists.

On 2 September 2026, Kanu was arrested by plainclothes police officers while reportedly seeking legal representation in Moulvibazar. Evidence against her included allegations by the Tea Workers' Union that she had led an assault on their headquarters in Labour House, stealing 5700 BDT and causing 20, 000 BDT of damage. Kanu was taken to a court in Moulvibazar, where she was charged and subsequently placed in pre-trial detention in Moulvibazar District Court. On the same day as her arrest, members of the Bangladesh Tea Worker Women's Forum, Cha Sramik Moha Sangram Committee and Cha Sramik Adhikhar Andolon began a pre-planned indefinite two-hour work stoppage between 09:00 and 11:00, impacting around 50 tea plantations in Sylhet, Moulvibazar and Habiganj District, as part of Kanu's calls for a daily wage and greater rights for workers.

The Ireland-based human rights organisation Front Line Defenders stated that Kanu's detention was "directly connected to her legitimate and peaceful defence of tea workers' rights", and called on Bangladeshi authorities to guarantee her "immediate and unconditional release", as well as "due process" in the criminal complaint against her.
