= Mostafapur Union =

Mostafapur Union মোস্তফাপুর ইউনিয়ন
- Union Council
- No. 11 Mostafapur Union Council
- Location in Bangladesh
- Country: Bangladesh
- Division: Sylhet Division
- District: Moulvibazar District
- Upazila: Moulvibazar Sadar Upazila

Government
  - Union Parishad Chairman: Tajul Islam

Population
  - Total: 18,053
- Demonym: Mostafapuri
- Time zone: UTC+6 (BST)
- Website: mostafapurup.moulvibazar.gov.bd

Mostafapur Union (Bengali: মোস্তফাপুর ইউনিয়ন) is a Union Parishad under Moulvibazar Sadar Upazila of Moulvibazar District in the division of Sylhet, Bangladesh. It has an area of 21 square kilometres and a population of 18,053.

== History ==
The union was named after the village of Mostafapur. The village was named in honour of Shah Mustafa, an Islamic preacher and companion of Shah Jalal, who came to Moulvibazar to propagate the light of Islam. The house where he initially started residing is now known as Mostafapur Puran Bari (Bengali: মোস্তফাপুর পুরান বাড়ী).

== Geography ==
Mostafapur Union is located at the eastern part of Moulvibazar Sadar Upazila. It shares borders with the Kanakpur and Amtail Unions in the west, Rajnagar Upazila in the east, Chadnighat Union in the north, and Giyashnagar Union in the south. It has an area of 21 square kilometres.

== Demography ==
Mostafapur has a population of 18,053.

== Administration ==
Mostafapur constitutes the no. 11 union council of Moulvibazar Sadar Upazila. It contains 33 villages and 12 mouzas.

=== Villages ===
- Hilalpur, Shompashi, Ghorua, Bahar Mordan, Kuchar Mahal, Gandarvpur, Lamajagannathpur, Pagoliya
- Mostafapur, West Mostafapur, Kamarshuta, North Jagannathpur, Goalabari, Shonapur, Jagannathpur
- Kotar Mahal, Harinarayanpur, Goyghor, Sribour, Fotehpur, Baurghoriya, Khojar Mahal, Birbali
- Badeshompashi, Ekagopal, Jinaikaist, Jagatshi, Changaon, Folaun, Komla Kolosh, Mutukopur, Ajmeru, Ramabollav

== Economy and tourism ==
Mostafapur has a significant number of British and American immigrants contributing to its economy. It has one central bazaar. In the village of Goyghor, there is an ancient mosque from the Mughal era called Goyghor Mosque. There is also a large ecopark in Shonapur.

== Education ==
The Union has a literacy rate of 60%. It has 10 state primary schools and 2 private primary schools. It has one exam centre for the Junior Dakhil Certificate (JDC) in Hilalpur High School. There are three madrasas and

== Language and culture ==
The native population converse in their native Sylheti dialect but can also converse in Standard Bengali. Languages such as Arabic and English are also taught in schools. The Union contains 8 eidgahs.

== List of chairmen ==
List of chairmen
Number	Name	Term
01	Inaam Ullah	1960 - 1965
02	Muhammad Irshad	1965 - 1970
03	Muhammad Anwar Khan	1970 - 1972
04	Gaura Pada Goswami	1972 - 1974
05	Dr. Firuz Miah	1972 - 1974
06	Muhammad Abdul Matin Motar Miah	1972 - 1974
07	Muzzammil Miah	1972 - 1974
08	Muhammad Monnaf Miah	1974 - 1975
09	Muhammad Saad Ullah	1975 - 1976
10	Muhammad Milad Husayn	1977 - 1988
11	Muhammad Mahmudur Rahman	1988 - 1992
12	Muhammad Yunus Miah BComm	19/6/92 - 31/5/97
13	Muhammad Habibur Rahman	16/6/97 - 4/2/98
14	Muhammad Sayyid Ahmad	5/2/98 - 5/4/05
15	Muhammad Habibur Rahman	7/5/05 - 16/8/11
16	Sheikh Rumel Ahmed	17/8/11 - 16/8/16
17	Muhammad Tajul Islam	2016 - 2024
