= Goyghor Mosque =

Mosque in Moulvibazar, Bangladesh

Goyghor Khoja's Mosque
- গয়ঘর খোজার মসজিদ
- Location in Bangladesh

Religion
- Affiliation: Sunni Islam
- Ecclesiastical or organisational status: Mosque
- Leadership: Arob Ali
- Year consecrated: 1476
- Status: Active

Location
- Location: Moulvibazar, Bangladesh
- Coordinates: 24°27′40″N 91°44′39″E

Architecture
- Architects: Musa ibn Haji Amir; Majlis Alam
- Type: Mosque architecture
- Style: Bengal Sultanate
- Completed: 1476; 550 years ago

Specifications
- Capacity: 700 worshipers
- Dome height (outer): 5.5 m (18 ft)
- Materials: Brick

The Goyghor Khoja's Mosque (Bengali: গয়ঘর খোজার মসজিদ; Arabic: مسجد الخواجه) is an ancient Sunni mosque located in the village of Goyghor in Mostafapur Union, Moulvibazar District, Bangladesh. It was built and established on top of a small hill during the reign of the Sultan of Bengal, Shamsuddin Yusuf Shah in 1476 and is named after Afghan chieftain Khwaja Usman.

== History ==
According to local villagers, when the mosque was being constructed, the area was covered in dense forest and inhabited by tigers. To this day, three marks of a tiger's paw remain on the eastern pillar inside the mosque. During the reign of Shamsuddin Yusuf Shah, Musa ibn Haji Amir and his son, the Minister of Sylhet, Majlis Alam, built the mosque in 1476. Majlis Alam is also known for building Shah Jalal's mosque in Sylhet.

In 1593, an Afghan chief by the name of Khwaja Usman, one of the Baro-Bhuyans of Bengal and the last Afghan ruler in Bengal, took shelter in this mosque after the Afghan rebellion against the Subahdar of Mughal Bengal, Man Singh I.

In the late 1930s, a scholar by the name of Azam Shah is said to have settled near the mosque. In 1940, the original dome fell apart and Azam Shah raised money for the building of a new dome which he successfully built alongside Ismail Mistri of Baniachong. In 1960, the mosque was again refurbished. After the departure of Azam Shah, it fell apart again and was held with branches and seedlings.

== Architecture ==
The dome is white-tiled and 5.5 metres (18 ft) tall. There are three large doors as well as six smaller doors. On the eastern pillar of the interior of the building, there is a mark of a tiger's paw. Near the ceiling, there is an Arabic inscription with a flowery design. There is a rock inscription on the western wall which is protected by an iron cage to avoid thieves. The brick masonry of the walls is very thick.

== See also ==
- Islam in Bangladesh
- List of mosques in Bangladesh
