= Mujibur Rahman Chowdhury (Moulvibazar politician) =

Bangladeshi politician

- মুজিবুর রহমান চৌধুরী

Member of the Bangladesh Parliament for Moulvibazar-4
- Incumbent
- Assumed office February 14, 2026
- Preceded by: Md. Abdus Shahid

Mujibur Rahman Chowdhury, also known as Hajji Mujib, is a Bangladeshi politician. He is a Member of Parliament representing the Moulvibazar-4 constituency.

== Political career ==
Mujibur Rahman Chowdhury was elected as a Member of Parliament for the first time from the Moulvibazar-4 constituency as a candidate of the Bangladesh Nationalist Party in the Thirteenth National Parliamentary Election held in 2026.
