= Syed Mohammad Ziaul Haque =

Officer of the Bangladesh Army

- Born: 11 November 1972 (age 53); Mostafapur, Sylhet District, Bangladesh
- Military career
- Allegiance: Bangladesh
- Branch: Bangladesh Army
- Service years: 1999 - 2011
- Rank: Major
- Unit: Bangladesh Infantry Regiment
- Known for: 2011 Bangladesh coup d'état attempt
- Awards: Sword of Honour (BMA)

Syed Mohammad Ziaul Haque is a former Bangladesh Army officer. He was one of the main plotters of the 2011 Bangladesh coup d'état attempt.

== Early life ==
Haque was born in the village of Mostafapur, Sylhet District (now in Moulvibazar District), Bangladesh. He completed his schooling at Uttara Holy Child School and College and Sylhet Cadet College. His father, Syed Zillul Haque, is a businessman. He is a practicing Muslim. He became more fundamentalist after his wife died of cancer in February 2008.

== Career ==
Haque joined the Bangladesh Army through the 41st long course of the Bangladesh Military Academy. He achieved the prestigious Sword of Honour for his all-round performance in BMA. He studied in the Military Institute of Science and Technology. He was described as being "intelligent" and "skilled in IT".

== Anti-government activities ==
He played a key role in the organization of the 2011 Bangladesh coup d'état attempt, contacting army officers in different cantonments asking them to take part in the coup. He went on the run after the coup attempt failed.

Haque allegedly "joined" Ansarullah Bangla Team and quickly rose through their ranks. The leaders of Jamaat'ul-Mujahideen Bangladesh and Ansarullah Bangla Team had a meeting inside the Kashimpur high security jail and agreed to work together. Jamaat'ul-Mujahideen wanted Major Zia to help them with their bombmaking skills.

In 2016, the government of Bangladesh announced a 4-million-taka bounty on him.

In October 2020, the former major Haque was among 13 suspects charged by Counter Terrorism and Transnational Crime unit of Dhaka Metropolitan Police for the murder of a blogger Niladri Chattopadhyay Niloy.

On 10 February 2021, he was additionally convicted for murder of Jagriti Prokashoni publisher Foysal Arefin Dipon. He remained absconding while the verdict was given.

On 16 February 2021, Haque was sentenced to death by a court in Bangladesh for his role in the murder of Avijit Roy. According to a media statement from 2018 by the then Chief of Counter Terrorism and Transnational Crime Unit (CTTC) Monirul Islam, Major Syed Mohammad Ziaul Haque, was "directly involved" in the criminal act as he was present on the spot when the murder took place.

In August 2021, he received another death sentence in absentia, this time as an Ansar al-Islam operative, along with 5 others, for the killing of a former USAID official and editor of Bangladesh's first LGBT magazine Roopbaan Xulhaz Mannan, and his friend Mahbub Rabbi Tonoy.

In February 2022, Zillul Haque, the father of Ziaul Haque, declared his son as "a bigot and an extremist" in an interview with Prothom Alo English. Haque had gone missing, and his father reportedly never saw him again after December 2011.

On 29 December 2024, Haque, through his lawyer, M Sarwar Hossain, sent an application to the Ministry of Law, Justice and Parliamentary Affairs to withdraw all cases against him. His lawyer claimed that he had no knowledge of his whereabouts.
