= Moulvibazar-4 =

Constituency of Bangladesh's Jatiya Sangsad

Coordinates: 24.31°N 91.73°E

- Constituency for the Jatiya Sangsad
- District: Moulvibazar District
- Division: Sylhet Division
- Electorate: 250,352 (2018)

Current constituency
- Created: 1984
- Party: Bangladesh Nationalist Party
- Member: Mujibur Rahman Chowdhury
- ← 237 Moulvibazar-3 239 Habiganj-1 →

Moulvibazar-4 is a constituency represented in the Jatiya Sangsad (National Parliament) of Bangladesh since 2026 by Mujibur Rahman Chowdhury of the Bangladesh Nationalist Party.

== Boundaries ==
The constituency encompasses Sreemangal and Kamalganj upazilas.

== History ==
The constituency was created in 1984 from the Sylhet-15 constituency when the former Sylhet District was split into four districts: Sunamganj, Sylhet, Moulvibazar, and Habiganj.

Ahead of the 2008 general election, the Election Commission redrew constituency boundaries to reflect population changes revealed by the 2001 Bangladesh census. The 2008 redistricting altered the boundaries of the constituency.

Ahead of the 2018 general election, The Bangladesh Election Commission expanded the boundaries of the constituency by adding four union parishads of Kamalganj Upazila: Adampur, Alinagar, Islampur, and Shamshernagar.

== Members of Parliament ==
Election	Member	Party
1986	Mohammad Elias	Bangladesh Muslim League
1988	Ahad Miah	Jatiya Party
1991	Md. Abdus Shahid	Awami League
Feb 1996	Shafiqur Rahman	Bangladesh Nationalist Party
Jun 1996	Md. Abdus Shahid	Awami League
2026	Mujibur Rahman Chowdhury	Bangladesh Nationalist Party

== Elections ==
=== Elections in the 2020s ===
General election 2026: Moulvibazar-4
Party	Candidate	Votes	%	±%
BNP	Md Mujibur Rahman Chowdhury			
BKM	Sheikh Nure Alam Hamidi			
NCP	Pritom Das			
BSD	Md Abul Hasan			
JP(E)	Md Jorif Hossain			
Majority				
Turnout				

=== Elections in the 2010s ===
Md. Abdus Shahid was elected unopposed in the 2014 general election after opposition parties withdrew their candidacies in a boycott of the election.

=== Elections in the 2000s ===
General Election 2008: Moulvibazar-4
Party	Candidate	Votes	%	±%
AL	Md. Abdus Shahid	131,740	61.4	+17.3
BNP	Mujibur Rahman Chowdhury	79,599	37.1	+21.2
Independent	Pongkoj Auleseos Kondo	2,277	1.1	N/A
BIF	Abdul Muhit Hasani	632	0.3	N/A
JSD	M. A. Malek	201	0.1	0.0
Majority		52,141	24.3	+12.4
Turnout		214,449	85.7	+9.7
AL hold				

General Election 2001: Moulvibazar-4
Party	Candidate	Votes	%	±%
AL	Md. Abdus Shahid	96,329	44.1	−6.9
Independent	Mujibur Rahman Chowdhury	70,364	32.2	N/A
BNP	Md. Mahsin Mia	34,726	15.9	+2.3
IJOF	Md. Askir Miah	16,975	7.8	N/A
JSD	Eleman Kabir	288	0.1	N/A
Majority		25,965	11.9	−5.9
Turnout		218,682	76.0	+0.3
AL hold				

=== Elections in the 1990s ===
General Election June 1996: Moulvibazar-4
Party	Candidate	Votes	%	±%
AL	Md. Abdus Shahid	91,811	51.0	−0.5
JP(E)	Ahad Miah	59,825	33.3	−7.9
BNP	Shafiqur Rahman	24,488	13.6	+9.1
Jamaat	Abdul Gani Tarafdar	2,684	1.5	N/A
Zaker Party	Samsuzzaman	572	0.3	N/A
Independent	Ram Kanta Singha	275	0.2	N/A
Gano Forum	Abdul Rashid Chowdhury	266	0.1	N/A
Majority		31,986	17.8	+7.5
Turnout		179,921	75.7	+15.9
AL hold				

General Election 1991: Moulvibazar-4
Party	Candidate	Votes	%	±%
AL	Md. Abdus Shahid	75,321	51.5	
JP(E)	Ahad Miah	60,215	41.2	
BNP	Saifur Rahman	6,594	4.5	
Jamaat	Sirajul Islam Motlib	1,547	1.1	
BAKSAL	Syed Abu Zafar Ahmed	1,547	1.1	
Zaker Party	Samsuzzaman	914	0.6	
Majority		15,106	10.3	
Turnout		146,138	59.8	
AL gain from JP(E)				
