= Shafiqur Rahman (disambiguation) =

Shafiqur Rahman (born 1958) is a Bangladeshi Islamic politician and Bangladesh Jamat-e-Islami Emir.

Shafiqur Rahman may refer to:

- Shafiqur Rahman (Moulvibazar politician) (1959–2009), Bangladesh Nationalist Party politician
- Shafiqur Rahman (diplomat), Ambassador of Bangladesh to Nepal
- Shafiqur Rahman (general) (born 1962), Bangladeshi Army officer
- Muhammad Shafiqur Rahman (1949–2026), Bangladesh Awami League politician and journalist

== See also ==
- Shafiqur Rahman Barq (born 1930), Indian politician
- Shafiqur Rahaman Chowdhury (born 1957), Bangladesh Awami League politician
- Shafiqur Rahman Nadwi (1942–2002), Indian Islamic scholar
