= Fatema Chowdhury Paru =

Bangladeshi politician

- ফাতেমা চৌধুরী পারু

Member of the Bangladesh Parliament for Reserved Women's Seat–24
- In office 5 March 1991 – 30 March 1996
- In office 2 April 1979 – 24 March 1982
- Preceded by: Position created

Personal details
- Born: 4 August 1944 Sylhet, Assam Province, British India
- Died: 25 December 2002 (aged 58) Dhaka, Bangladesh
- Party: Bangladesh Nationalist Party
- Relations: Yamin Chowdhury (brother); Mahmudul Amin Chowdhury (cousin)
- Education: Sylhet Government Women's College

Fatema Chowdhury Paru (4 August 1944 – 25 December 2002) was a politician from Sylhet district in Bangladesh who was a member of parliament for the reserved 24-seat constituency.

== Early life ==
Paru was born on 4 August 1944 in Rankeli village of Golapganj Upazila, Sylhet District, East Bengal, British India. She was the first daughter of the late Abdul Hamid Hamdu Miah. In 1973, she passed HSC from Sylhet Government Women's College. Her brother Yamin Chowdhury received the title of Bir Bikram.

== Career ==
Paru was a member of parliament nominated by the Bangladesh Nationalist Party from the women's seat 24 of the second, fifth and sixth Jatiya Sangsad. She has died.
