= Moulvibazar-3 =

Constituency of Bangladesh's Jatiya Sangsad

Coordinates: 24.48°N 91.77°E

- Constituency for the Jatiya Sangsad
- District: Moulvibazar District
- Division: Sylhet Division
- Electorate: 391,358 (2018)

Current constituency
- Created: 1984
- Party: Bangladesh Nationalist Party
- Member: M. Naser Rahman
- ← 236 Moulvibazar-2 238 Moulvibazar-4 →

Moulvibazar-3 is a constituency represented in the Jatiya Sangsad (National Parliament) of Bangladesh since 2026 by M. Naser Rahman of the Bangladesh Nationalist Party.

== Boundaries ==
The constituency encompasses Moulvibazar Sadar and Rajnagar upazilas.

== History ==
The constituency was created in 1984 from a Sylhet constituency when the former Sylhet District was split into four districts: Sunamganj, Sylhet, Moulvibazar, and Habiganj.

== Members of Parliament ==
Election	Member	Party
1986	Azizur Rahman	Awami League
1988	Gias Uddin Chowdhury	Jatiya Party
1991	Azizur Rahman	Awami League
Jun 1996	Saifur Rahman	Bangladesh Nationalist Party
Nov 2001 by-election	M. Naser Rahman	Bangladesh Nationalist Party
2008	Syed Mohsin Ali	Awami League
2015 by-election	Syeda Saira Mohsin	Awami League
2018	Nesar Ahmed	Awami League
2024	Mohammad Zillur Rahman	Awami League
2026	M. Naser Rahman	Bangladesh Nationalist Party

== Elections ==
=== Elections in the 2020s ===
General election 2026: Moulvibazar-3
Party	Candidate	Votes	%	±%
BNP	M. Naser Rahman	156,757		
Jamaat	Md Abdul Mannan	77,636		
CPB	Jahar Lal Dutta			
Khelafat Majlis	Ahmed Bilal			
Majority		79,121		
Turnout				

=== Elections in the 2010s ===
Syed Mohsin Ali died in September 2015. Syeda Saira Mohsin, his widow, was elected unopposed in November 2015 after the Election Commission disqualified the other four candidates in the by-election scheduled for December 2015.

Syed Mohsin Ali was elected unopposed in the 2014 general election after opposition parties withdrew their candidacies in a boycott of the election.

=== Elections in the 2000s ===
General Election 2008: Moulvibazar-3
Party	Candidate	Votes	%	±%
AL	Syed Mohsin Ali	144,921	55.3	N/A
BNP	Saifur Rahman	112,895	43.1	−51.2
Independent	Shamim Afzal	1,950	0.7	N/A
CPB	Syed Abu Zafar Ahmed	1,264	0.5	N/A
BSD	Mamunur Rashid Sohel	997	0.4	N/A
JSD	Aliur Rahman	97	0.0	N/A
Majority		32,026	12.2	−76.4
Turnout		262,124	84.8	+45.3
AL gain from BNP				

Saifur Rahman stood for two seats in the October 2001 general election: Sylhet-1 and Moulvibazar-3. After winning both, he chose to represent the former and quit the latter, triggering a by-election. Naser Rahman, his son, was elected on the BNP ticket in a November 2001 by-election.

Moulvibazar-3 by-election, November 2001
Party	Candidate	Votes	%	±%
BNP	Naser Rahman	102,987	94.3	+42.3
JP(E)	Syed Sahab Uddin Ahmad	6,201	5.7	N/A
Majority		96,786	88.6	+82.3
Turnout		109,188	39.5	−35.7
BNP hold				

General Election 2001: Moulvibazar-3
Party	Candidate	Votes	%	±%
BNP	Saifur Rahman	108,513	52.0	+2.4
AL	Azizur Rahman	95,319	45.7	+8.5
IJOF	Suleman Khan	3,980	1.9	N/A
Bangladesh Samajtantrik Dal (Basad-Khalekuzzaman)	Mamunur Rashid	485	0.2	N/A
Independent	Md. A. Matin	371	0.2	N/A
Majority		= 13,194	6.3	−6.1
Turnout		208,668	75.2	−0.3
BNP hold				

=== Elections in the 1990s ===
General Election June 1996: Moulvibazar-3
Party	Candidate	Votes	%	±%
BNP	Saifur Rahman	84,292	49.6	+23.0
AL	Azizur Rahman	63,177	37.2	−4.9
JP(E)	Gias Uddin Chowdhury	15,170	8.9	−20.1
Jamaat	Sirajul Islam Motlib	3,530	2.1	N/A
IOJ	Jobayer Ahmed Chowdhury	2,237	1.3	N/A
JSD	Md. Abdul Haq	535	0.3	−1.5
Bangladesh Muslim League (Jamir Ali)	Md. Abdul Matin	427	0.3	N/A
Independent	Nilufar Zaman Nila Chowdhury	255	0.2	N/A
Zaker Party	Saeed Ullah	249	0.2	0.0
Bangladesh Samajtantrik Dal (Khalekuzzaman)	Badrul Hossain	210	0.1	N/A
Majority		21,115	12.4	−0.7
Turnout		170,082	75.5	+24.6
BNP gain from AL				

General Election 1991: Moulvibazar-3
Party	Candidate	Votes	%	±%
AL	Azizur Rahman	55,977	42.1	
JP(E)	Gias Uddin Ahmed	35,528	29.0	
BNP	Saifur Rahman	35,396	26.6	
JSD	Md. Abdul Haq	2,344	1.8	
Jatiya Samajtantrik Dal-JSD	Nasir Uddin Chowdhury	419	0.3	
Zaker Party	Ibrahim Khalil Azadi	297	0.2	
Majority		17,449	13.1	
Turnout		132,961	50.9	
AL gain from JP(E)				
