= 2011 Bangladeshi coup attempt =

Unsuccessful coup d'état

2011 Bangladesh coup d'état attempt
Date	December 2011
Location	Bangladesh
Result	Coup failed

Belligerents
Government of Bangladesh	Islamist factions of Bangladesh Army; Hizb ut-Tahrir

Commanders and leaders
Sheikh Hasina (PM)	Syed Mohammad Ziaul Haque

Strength
	Unknown

Casualties and losses
0	0

The 2011 Bangladesh coup attempt was an attempted military coup planned in January, 2012. The coup participants were led by Syed Mohammad Ziaul Haque and are widely believed to have been backed by the pan-Islamist fundamentalist group Hizb ut-Tahrir. The coup was unsuccessful and, on January 19, 2012, the Bangladesh Army announced that they had prevented the coup and had arrested or implicated sixteen former or current mid-ranked officers. The Bangladeshi government attributed the coup to religious fundamentalism and a desire to institute sharia law in Bangladesh; coup participants stated that their goals related to nationalism and mistrust of the government's relationship with India. According to others, the coup was likely as a result of general discontent of internal structures in the military, possibly stemming from the government's handling of the 2009 Bangladesh Rifles revolt and resulting crackdown on the army.

== Attempted coup ==
According to a participant, Ehsan Yusuf, the participants of the coup had planned to surround the Bangabhaban, the Ganabhaban and the Dhaka Cantonment to demand the resignation of the Hasina government. The plans had originally been scheduled around the time of the 2009 Bangladesh Rifles revolt but had not been carried out. According to the army, the coup participants were mostly made up of mid-ranked current and retired officers in the Bangladesh Army who were widely believed to have been supported by a faction of Hizb ut-Tahrir although this has been disputed.

On December 9th 2011, the participants held a teleconference and after the departure of one of their members, another expressed uncertainty about the plan. After the meeting, lieutenant colonel Ehsan Yusuf informed another member of the army who reported the potential coup. The Bangladesh army arrested Yusuf on December 15th and interrogate him, upon which they discover the involvement of the group's leaders: then-major Syed Mohammad Ziaul Haque. and businessman Ishraq Ahmed, who claimed to be involved in preventing the 1996 Bangladeshi coup attempt, and was set to be the leader of the new government.

Ziaul had become a military officer after training at the Bangladesh Military Academy and turned to religious fundamentalism after the death of his wife from cancer. Ziaul coordinated with the other officers involved through texts, calls and social media posts especially Facebook. He used an UK-based SIM card to contact other officers after the government was made aware of his involvement and encouraged the other members to carry out the coup in January. Ziaul was removed from his position in the military as a result of this revelation and placed into custody on December 23rd. However, he managed to escape shortly afterwards.

On 31 December, another alleged coup member, Zakir Hossain, was arrested. He and Yusuf gave confessional statements to the Dhaka Metropolitan Court admitting to their role in the coup.

On January 19, 2012, the Inter-Services Public Relations announced that the Bangladesh Army had prevented a military coup against the government of Sheikh Hasina, organised by current and former army officers and an individual living overseas in Hong Kong, potentially backed by Hizib ut-Tahrir. They declared the arrest of two retired officers and claimed that sixteen current and former officers had been implicated and that Ziaul had fled.

In September 2012, the Jatiya Sangsad requested the arrest of Major Ziaul and Ishraq Ahmed, who they believed to be in Thailand According to a 2018 article on Terrorism and Political Violence, Ziaul was believed to have become a commander of Ansarullah Bangla Team, a jihadi fundamentalist terrorist organisation in Bangladesh although there's little evidence to support this claim.

== Motivations ==
The attempted coup is widely believed to have been instigated or backed by a branch of Hizb ut-Tahrir, a pan-Islamist fundamentalist organisation that in 2009, had been banned in Bangladesh. The group had historically recruited university students in Bangladesh, but, since their prohibition, had switched to recruiting military officers. By the time of the coup, they had gained the allegiance of "several dozens" of current and former officers. However, since the group could not meet in public, the leadership could misrepresent themselves to the officers as much more widely supported than they were.

According to an article in Himalayan and Central Asian Studies, and the Bangladesh army, the purpose of the coup had been allow Hizb ut-Tahrir to institute a form of Caliphate or sharia law in the country. A director of personal services in the army said that the coup has been designed "to spread disaffection", and other representatives said it had been organised by "religious fanatics". According to coup participant Ishraq Ahmed, the goal had instead been based in nationalism, and the participant's desire to remove Hasina from power was due to their feeling that she was "letting Bangladesh become a Bantustan run by India" or otherwise turning it into a "puppet state of India."

The 2016 Routledge Handbook of Contemporary Bangladesh made the argument that the coup had been supported by the middle-ranking military officers due to their displeasure with the government's handling Bangladesh Rifles revolt and a belief that those involved should have been punished, general discontent and disillusionment with the higher ranks, and the "sanctioning suspected recalcitrant officers". In 2009, the Bangladesh government had started a crackdown on the military after the Bangladesh Rifles revolt, which was also believed to be a contributing factor to the attempted coup. The Asian Journal of Political Science attributed the participant's motivations to more general societal discontent, especially with the two leading political parties: Bangladesh Nationalist Party and the Awami League. The authors described the coup as an "act carried out by a segment of the population who would find refuge in political Islam".

== Aftermath ==
In Handbook of Terrorism in the Asia-Pacific, the authors wrote that the successful recruitment of military officers and attempted coup "indicate[d] a deeper crisis within Bangladeshi society". In a piece for Time, Ishaan Tharoor argued at the time that, due to the coup's participant's potential connection to Islamist groups, the coup could be used by Hasina and her government as a way to secure power and "beat down more religious opponents". In the years after the attempted coup, Hasina made public speeches praising rank and file army members and their role in Bangladesh's democracy. Her government also increased military spending and defence budgets.

In 2021, Ziaul was sentenced to death in abstensia over an unrelated murder. After the 2024 uprising and subsequent exile of Sheikh Hasina, his lawyer applied for all cases against him to be dismissed.

== See also ==
- List of coups d'état and coup attempts since 2010
- Military coups in Bangladesh
