= Nesar Ahmed =

Bangladeshi politician

- নেছার আহমদ

Member of the Bangladesh Parliament for Moulvibazar-3
- In office 30 December 2018 – 7 January 2024
- Preceded by: Syeda Saira Mohsin
- Succeeded by: Mohammad Zillur Rahman

Personal details
- Born: 16 December 1952 (age 72)
- Political party: Bangladesh Awami League

Nesar Ahmed (born 16 December 1952) is a Bangladesh Awami League politician and the incumbent Jatiya Sangsad member representing the Moulvibazar-3 constituency.

== Career ==
Ahmed was elected to parliament from Moulvibazar-3 as a Bangladesh Awami League candidate 30 December 2018. He is the president of Moulvibazar District unit of Bangladesh Awami League.
