= Saifur Rahman (Bangladeshi politician) =

Bangladeshi politician (1932–2009)

Mohammad Saifur Rahman
- মোহাম্মদ সাইফুর রহমান
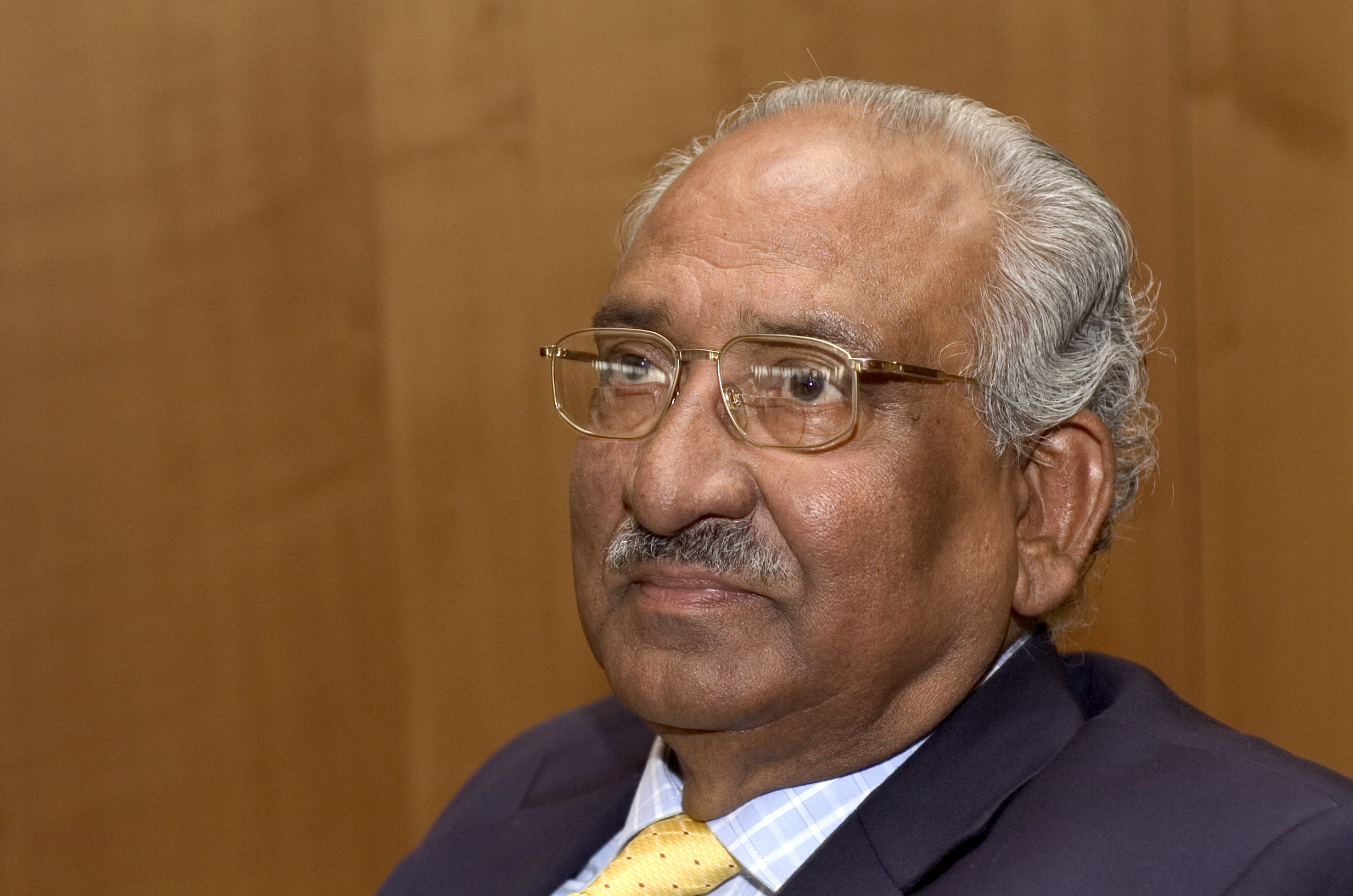
- Saifur Rahman at the European Union in Brussels (2005)

8th,16th & 20th Minister of Finance
- In office 10 October 2001 – 28 October 2006
- President: Shahabuddin Ahmed; A. Q. M. Badruddoza Chowdhury; Muhammad Jamiruddin Sircar (acting); Iajuddin Ahmed
- Prime Minister: Khaleda Zia
- Preceded by: Shah A M S Kibria
- Succeeded by: Abul Maal Abdul Muhith
- In office 20 March 1991 – 30 March 1996
- President: Shahabuddin Ahmed (acting); Abdur Rahman Biswas
- Prime Minister: Khaleda Zia
- Preceded by: Mohammad Abdul Munim
- Succeeded by: Shah A M S Kibria
- In office 10 April 1980 – 30 May 1981
- President: Ziaur Rahman
- Prime Minister: Shah Azizur Rahman
- Preceded by: Position established
- Succeeded by: Abul Maal Abdul Muhith

Member of Parliament for Sylhet-1
- In office 10 October 2001 – 28 October 2006
- Preceded by: Humayun Rashid Chowdhury
- Succeeded by: Abul Maal Abdul Muhith

Member of Parliament for Moulvibazar-3
- In office 15 February 1996 – 9 October 2001
- Preceded by: Azizur Rahman
- Succeeded by: M. Naser Rahman

Member of Parliament for Sylhet - 14(Now Moulvibazar-3)
- In office 18 February 1979 – 12 February 1982
- Preceded by: Toabur Rahim
- Succeeded by: Azizur Rahman

Personal details
- Born: 6 October 1932 Mostafapur, Assam, British India
- Died: 5 September 2009 (aged 76) Ashuganj, Chittagong, Bangladesh
- Party: Bangladesh Nationalist Party
- Children: M. Naser Rahman
- Parent(s): Abdul Basit and Talebunnessa
- Education: University of Dhaka; Institute of Chartered Accountants in England and Wales
- Occupation: Chartered accountant

Mohammad Saifur Rahman (Bengali: মোহাম্মদ সাইফুর রহমান; 6 October 1932 – 5 September 2009) was a Bangladeshi chartered accountant, economist and politician. He was a leader of the Bangladesh Nationalist Party and the longest-serving Finance Minister of Bangladesh. He delivered 12 national budgets in three terms between 1980 and 1981, 1991–1996 and 2001–2006 over a ministerial life spanning from December 1976 until October 2006 in three different governments. He was Trade & Commerce Minister for the first three years, and thereafter Finance and Planning Minister for 12 years.

In 1994, he was elected governor of the golden jubilee conference of the World Bank and International Monetary Fund in Madrid, Spain. In 2005, Saifur Rahman was awarded Ekushey Padak, the second highest state honor of Bangladesh.

== Early life and education ==
Saifur Rahman was born on 6 October 1932, in the village of Baharmardan located in current Mostafapur Union, Moulvibazar Sadar, Moulvibazar District, in the Sylhet Division of Bangladesh. His father was Abdul Basit. As a young man, he participated in the Bengali Language Movement of 1952, part of a growing nationalism. He was vice-president of Salimullah Muslim Hall while at University of Dhaka.

Saifur Rahman did his matriculation from Moulvibazar Government High School in 1949 and did his Intermediate from Sylhet MC College in 1951. He graduated from University of Dhaka with a BCom in 1953. And in the next year, he went to London and studied to qualify as a Chartered Accountant; he earned his certificate from the Institute of Chartered Accountants in England and Wales. He was the founder of one of the first CA firms in Bangladesh Rahman Rahman Huq which is member firm of KPMG. He became a specialist in monetary, fiscal and development economics.

== Career ==
In 2005, he was awarded Ekushey Padak, the second-highest state award, for his role in the Bengali Language Movement. A prominent chartered accountant, Saifur Rahman was one of the founders of Rahman Rahamn Huq (currently KPMG Bangladesh), a noted chartered accountancy firm.

He actively advocated to establish three prominent educational institutions: Sylhet Agricultural University, Sylhet Teacher's Training College, and Sylhet Engineering College. Active in professional organizations, he was a founding member of the Bangladesh Institute of Law and International Affairs, and served as the president of the Institute of Chartered Accountants of Bangladesh, and president of the United Nations Association of Bangladesh.

== Politics ==
Saifur Rahman joined a political coalition called the Jatiyatabadi Ganatantrik Dal in 1978 who were supporters of the then president Ziaur Rahman. The party was formalized in September 1978 as the Bangladesh Nationalist Party (BNP). The party formed its first administration after the general election in 1979, in which Saifur Rahman won a seat from his home district in Moulvibazar (Sylhet -14)

Saifur Rahman was appointed as the finance minister of the first BNP administration under President Ziaur Rahman, in which he served until 1981. Saifur Rahman prepared a record 12 budgets in Bangladesh; he has been praised for opening up Bangladesh's economy in the early 1990s and pioneering major economic reforms. He contributed to the expansion of the economy after the restoration of parliamentary democracy. He served as a minister of Bangladesh for a total of 14 years.

Together with the BNP, Saifur Rahman was successful in the general elections of 2001. Contesting on behalf of his party in the parliamentary constituency Moulvibazar-3, Saifur Rahman gained 52 per cent of the total votes. In another contest at the constituency Sylhet-1, Saifur Rahman secured 53 per cent of the total votes, again defeating a rival candidate from the Awami League. As per the constitution, Saifur had to leave blank one of his won constituencies to proceed the house session. He decided to leave the Moulvibazar-3 seat which was later retaken by his son M. Naser Rahman, also representing the Bangladesh Nationalist Party.

In the general elections in 2008, Saifur Rahman was defeated in his two constituencies by the Awami League candidates. Abul Maal Abdul Muhith won in Sylhet-1, and was appointed as Finance Minister.

== Personal life ==
Saifur Rahman married Duree Samad, daughter of Late Bazlur Samad Chowdhury, a reputed banker from Chittagong. Saifur Rahman's maternal uncle-in-law was late Abul Kashem Khan, veteran industrialist and minister.

Duree died of cancer in 2003. They had three sons and a daughter. One son M. Naser Rahman has followed Saifur into politics; in 2001 by-elections, he won his father's left constituency of Moulvibazar-3. The youngest son married a daughter of the late Chowdhury Kamal Ibne Yusuf, a renowned political figure and former Minister. Saifur's only daughter Saifa Rahman married Amer Siddiqi, the son of late Mustafizur Rahman Siddiqi, also a former Minister and diplomat.

== Death ==
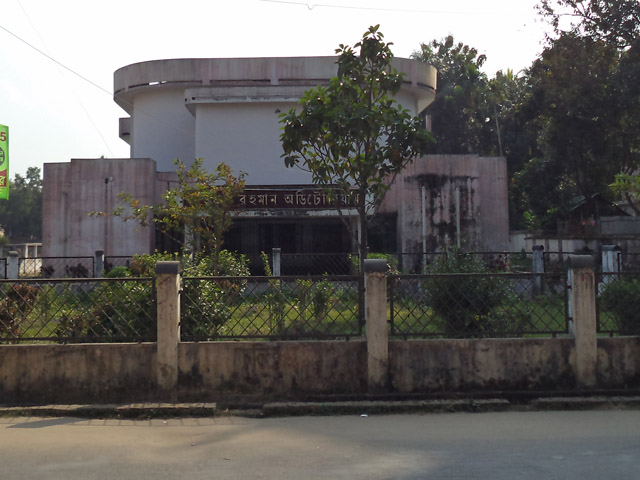
The Saifur Rahman Auditorium in Moulvibazar Government High School.

Saifur Rahman died in a road crash on 5 September 2009 in Brahmanbaria District on his way to Dhaka from his home district of Moulvibazar. Taken unconscious from the car, he was declared dead after being rushed to a hospital. On Friday he was in Sylhet visiting the shrines of Shah Jalal and Shah Paran, then headed for Moulvibazar. A total of five janazah prayers were held for Saifur Rahman, the first of which took place in Gulshan Azad Mosque, then at the BNP offices, Parliament buildings, Shahi Eidgah Maidan and Moulvibazar Government High School. The BNP began three days of mourning for the passing. Saifur Rahman was buried at his family graveyard beside his wife's grave in Baharmardan village after the prayers.

== Legacy ==
Saifur Rahman is credited with being the architect of Bangladesh's economic transformation and liberalization in 1990s by introducing VAT, tax reforms and free market policies. A M A Muhith, the Finance Minister, characterized Rahman's death as "a loss to the nation." The United States mentioned his "critical role in improving the lives and bringing prosperity to millions of Bangladeshis by opening Bangladesh's economy and promoting free market reforms."

== Awards ==
- Ekushey Padak, second highest state award 2005 for role in Bengali Language Movement
- Order Nationale, Highest National Order of Senegal
