= M. Naser Rahman =

Bangladeshi politician

M. Nasser Rahman
- এম. নাসের রহমান

Member of Parliament
- Incumbent
- Assumed office 17 February 2026
- Preceded by: Mohammad Zillur Rahman
- Constituency: Moulvibazar-3
- In office 12 November 2001 – 27 October 2006
- Preceded by: Saifur Rahman
- Succeeded by: Syed Mohsin Ali
- Constituency: Moulvibazar-3

Personal details
- Party: Bangladesh Nationalist Party
- Spouse: Rezina Rahman
- Parent: Saifur Rahman (father)

M. Naser Rahman is a Bangladesh Nationalist Party (BNP) politician and a former Jatiya Sangsad member representing the Moulvibazar-3 constituency.

== Career ==
Rahman was elected member of parliament from Moulvibazar-3 constituency in the by-election held on 12 November 2001 as a BNP candidate. The seat fell vacant after his father, Saifur Rahman, had left one of the two constituencies he won in the 2001 Bangladeshi general election.

Rahman is the chairman of Saifur Rahman Foundation. Naser Rahman is also the President of Moulvibazar District BNP.

== Charges and convictions ==
In May 2007, the Anti-Corruption Commission filed a case against Rahman. According to the charge, Rahman and his wife suppressed Tk 6.06 crore in a bank account. In April 2008, an anti-graft tribunal sentenced Rahman to 13 years in prison for concealing wealth information and amassing assets beyond known sources of income.

== Personal life ==
Rahman's father was Saifur Rahman, a former finance minister of Bangladesh. He married Regina Nasser (née Rahman) together they have two daughters and one son.
