= Moulvibazar Government High School =

Coordinates: 24°29′23″N 91°46′22″E

- মৌলভীবাজার সরকারি উচ্চ বিদ্যালয়
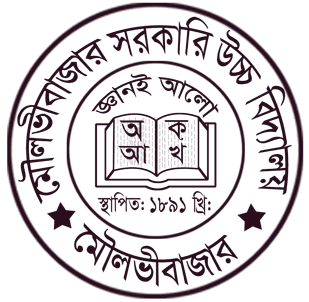

Location
- Syed Mujtoba Ali Road; Moulvibazar, 3200; Bangladesh

Information
- Type: Public boys' high school
- Established: 1891 (135 years ago)
- School board: Sylhet Education Board
- Website: www.mbghs.edu.bd

Moulvibazar Government High School is a secondary school in Moulvibazar, Bangladesh. It was established in 1891.

== History ==
Middle English School was established in Moulvibazar town in June 1885 during the British Raj. In 1891, it became a high school. The school was funded by advocate Harakinker Das and the Gupta family. The first headmaster of the school was Dijendra Nath Niogee. In 1899, Sharat Chandra Chaudhury was appointed the second headmaster of the school. Chaudhury was fired for writing against colonial rule of the British Raj. In 1914, the government of Assam nationalized the school and renamed it Moulvibazar Government High School. The nationalisation was followed by expansion of the school through the acquisition of land for building new hostels.

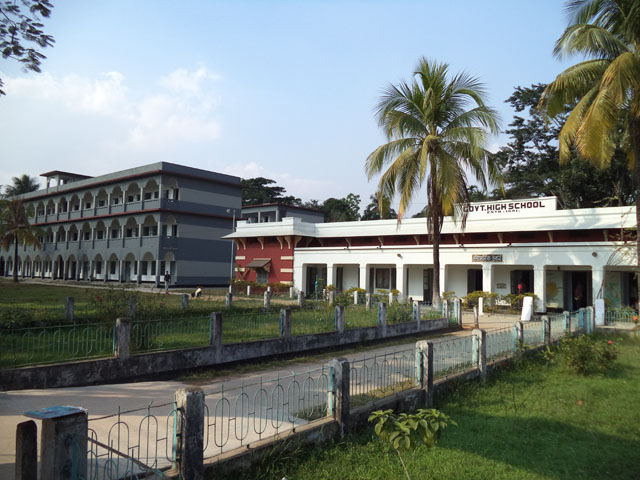
Three-story main building (left) for the classrooms and administrative building (right)

In 1930, J. R. Cunningham, director of public instruction of Assam, issued a circular banning Anti-British activities, independence movement, and forced students and parents to sign an undertaking declaring they would participate in those activities. The school was burned down in protests against the circular. The entrance examination center for Moulvibazar (South Sylhet mahakuma) was in Sylhet until 1938. In 1933, the school was approved as a center for entrance examination. After the end of the Bangladesh Liberation War, the school was used as a transit camp to store explosives and munitions left over from the war. On 20 December 1971, the storage at the school exploded. 25 bodies of Mukti Bahini personnel were recovered from the school but the death toll was believed to be much higher. They were buried in the playground of the school. A shaheed minar and a monument to the victims was built at the site of the explosion. 20 December is observed as Moulvibazar's Shaheed Day.

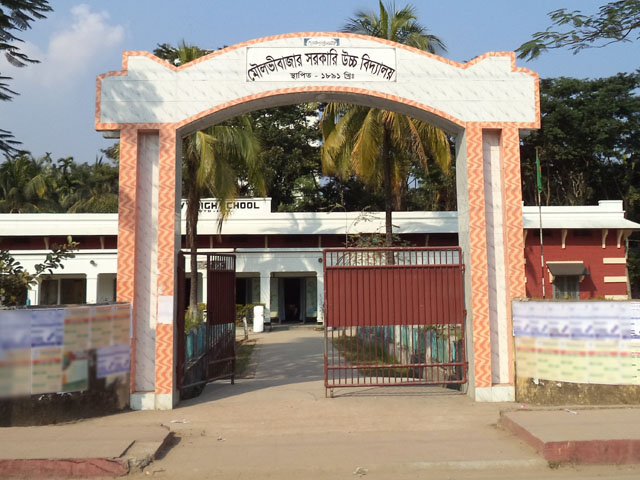
Front gate of the school

In 2001, alumni of the school Saifur Rahman became the finance minister of Bangladesh and constructed a number of buildings for the school. In 2009, Rahman's Funeral prayer was held at the school.

In October 2016, students of school protested against the Education Engineering Department plan to establish a zonal office on land of the school which was used by the students as a playground.

On 8 December 2017, a student of the school and another of Moulvibazar Government College was killed in an attack by a rival fraction of Bangladesh Chhatra League on school grounds. Moulvibazar police declared a bounty on five suspects worth 50,000 BDT each.

== Result ==
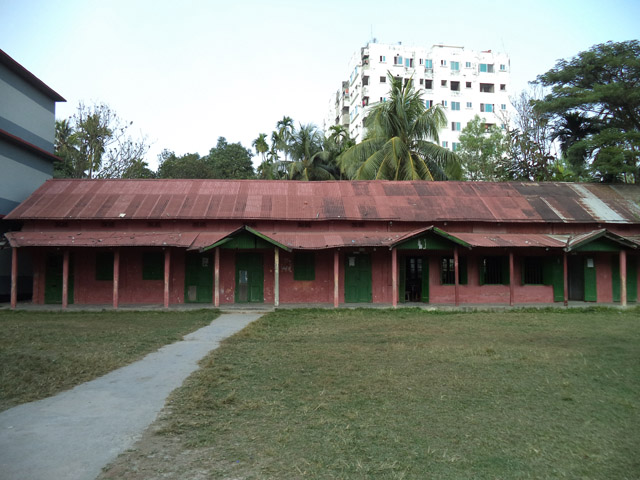
Tin-shed classrooms built during British period

The school ranked among the top 20 schools of Sylhet Board in SSC examination 2014.

SSC results
Year	GPA 5	Pass rate
2001	0	78.32%
2002	1	77.78%
2003	0	75.32%
2004	9	69.01%
2005	17	86.61%
2006	10	84.75%
2007	16	83.09%
2008	14	91.87%
2009	47	96.58%
2010	27	99.15%
2011	36	99.24%
2012	39	99.28%
2013	49	98.92%
2014	53	96.85%
2024	83	99.14%

== Notable alumni ==
- M Saifur Rahman, Bangladesh Nationalist Party (BNP) politician, former minister of finance, former minister of planning and former member of parliament
- Shah A M S Kibria, Awami League politician, former minister of finance and member of parliament
