= Fahima Hossain Jubly =

Bangladeshi politician

Member of the Bangladesh Parliament for Reserved Women's Seat-39
- In office 4 October 2005 – 27 October 2006
- Preceded by: Hosne Ara Wahid
- Succeeded by: Nilufar Chowdhury Moni

Personal details
- Party: Bangladesh Nationalist Party

Fahima Hossain Jubly is a Bangladesh Nationalist Party politician and a former member of the Bangladesh Parliament from a reserved seat.

== Career ==
Jubly was elected to parliament from reserved seat as a Bangladesh Nationalist Party candidate in 2005.
