= Moulvibazar Sadar Upazila =

Moulvibazar Sadar মৌলভীবাজার সদর
- Upazila
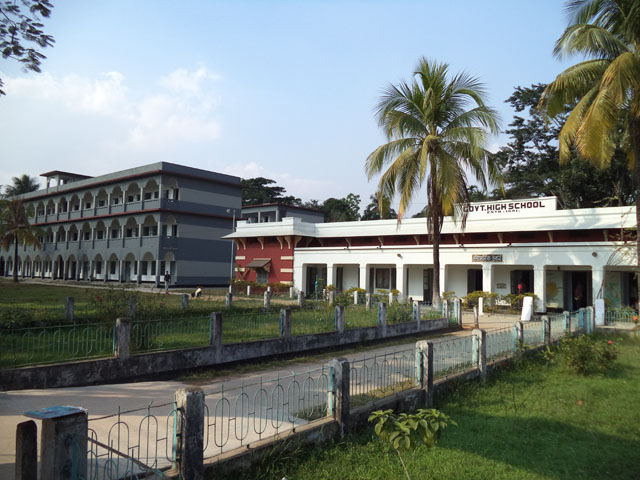
- Moulvibazar Government High School

- Country: Bangladesh
- Division: Sylhet
- District: Moulvibazar
- Headquarters: Moulvibazar

Government
  - MP (Moulvibazar-3): Vacant
  - Upazila Chairman: Vacant

Area
  - Total: 344.32 km^{2} (132.94 sq mi)

Population (2022)
  - Total: 377,962
  - Density: 1,097.7/km^{2} (2,843.0/sq mi)
- Demonym: Moulvibazari
- Time zone: UTC+6 (BST)
- Postal code: 3200
- Area code: 0861
- Website: moulvibazarsadar.moulvibazar.gov.bd

Moulvibazar Sadar (Bengali: মৌলভীবাজার সদর, is an upazila (sub-district) of Moulvibazar District in Sylhet Division, Bangladesh.

Maulvibazar Sadar Upazila mauza geocode map

== History ==
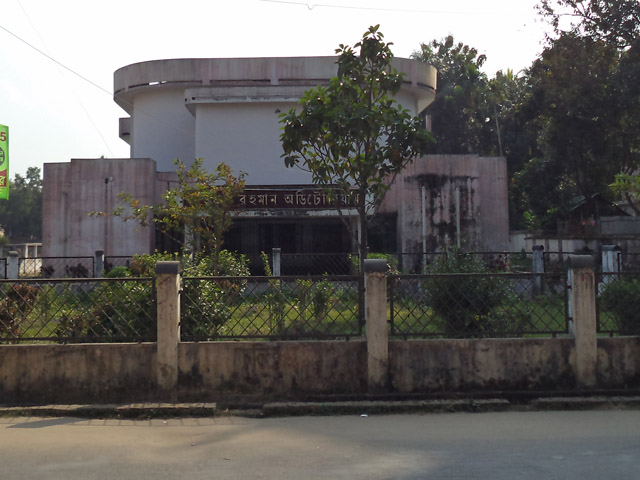
Saifur Rahman Auditorium

Moulvibazar was founded as a thana in 1882, centred around an expanding bazaar (marketplace) founded by Moulvi Syed Qudratullah back in 1771. In 1912, an anti-British protest was held in the village of Jagatshi, organised by Swami Dayananda. The anti-British Khilafat Movement in 1921 also spread to Moulvibazar and campaigners that were present included Congress leaders Chittaranjan Das, Hussain Ahmad Madani and Sarojini Naidu. In 1932, the Ali Amzad Government Girls' High School was opened as a public school.

During the Bangladesh War of Independence, armed resistance begun at the village of Srirainagar in Kanakpur on 27 March 1971. The Pakistani army was said to have made a surprise attack on the procession there in which two people were killed. The Naria massacre took place on 5 May in Upper Kagabala. On 20 December, a number of people were killed and wounded by mine explosions at the premises of the Moulvibazar Government High School. The status of the thana was upgraded to an upazila in 1984. In 2005, the Saifur Rahman Stadium was established, acting as a multi-use arena fitting 15,000 people.

== Geography ==
Moulvibazar Sadar is located at 24.4778°N 91.7667°E. It has 62,881 households and total area 344.32 km^{2}. It is bordered by Balaganj in the north, Rajnagar and Kamalganj in the east, Srimangal in the south and Nabiganj in the west.

== Administration ==
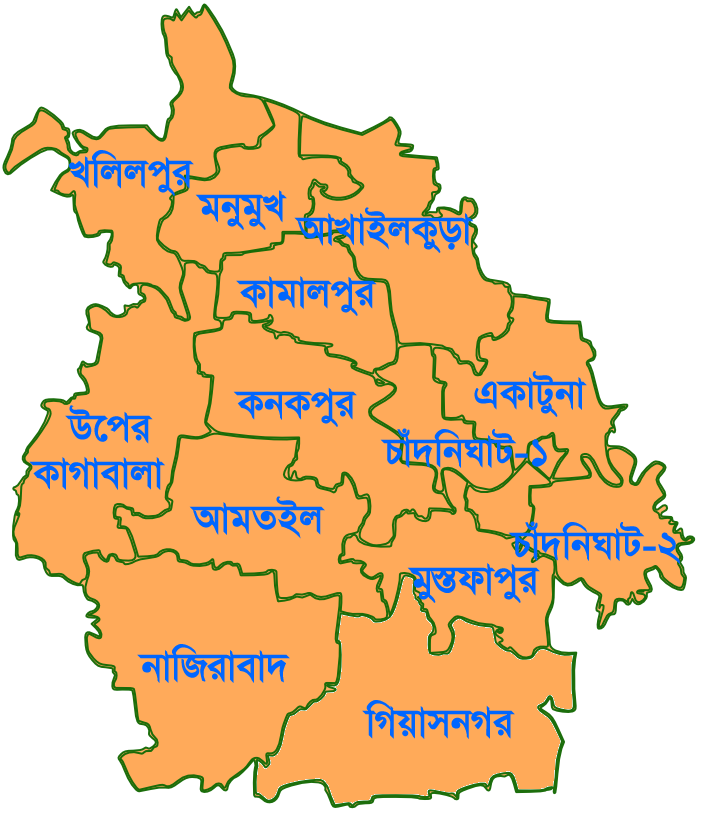
Out-dated map of the Upazila.

Moulvibazar Sadar Upazila is divided into Moulvibazar Municipality and 12 union parishads: Akhailkura, Amtail, Chandnighat, Ekatuna, Giasnagar, Kamalpur, Kanakpur Union, Khalilpur, Monumukh, Mostafapur Union, Nazirabad, and Uparkagabala. The union parishads are subdivided into 196 mauzas and 429 villages.

Moulvibazar Municipality is subdivided into 9 wards and 48 mahallas.

== Demographics ==
Religions in Moulvibazar Sadar Upazila (2022)
Religion	Percent
Islam	83.91%
Hinduism	15.94%
Other or not stated	0.15%

According to the 2022 Bangladeshi census, Moulvibazar Sadar Upazila had 77,806 households and a population of 377,962. 8.71% of the population were under 5 years of age. Moulvibazar Sadar had a literacy rate (age 7 and over) of 77.54%: 79.06% for males and 76.09% for females, and a sex ratio of 96.15 males for every 100 females. 78,595 (20.79%) lived in urban areas. Ethnic population is 1908 (0.50%).

According to the 2011 Census of Bangladesh, Moulvibazar Sadar Upazila had 62,881 households and a population of 342,468. 81,963 (23.93%) of the inhabitants were under 10 years of age. Moulvibazar Sadar had a literacy rate (age 7 and over) of 54.93%, compared to the national average of 51.8%, and a sex ratio of 995 females per 1000 males. 56,537 (16.51%) lived in urban areas. Ethnic population was 1,613 (0.47%), of which Manipuri were 1,071.

At the 1991 census, Moulvibazar Sadar had a population of 239,378. It has now grown to 281,593 according to later censuses. Males constitute 51.56% of the population, and females 48.44%. Its over-18 population is 126,303. Most of the people are Muslims. There are over 45,000 Hindus, 150 Christians, 17 Buddhists and 319 of other faiths.

=== Education ===
According to Banglapedia, Ali Amzad Government Girls' High School, founded in 1932, is a notable secondary school. Moulvibazar Sadar has an average literacy rate of 48.6%. The literacy rate for the urban areas is 65.2% while in the rural areas it is 45.7%. The Upazila has 5 colleges as well as vocational, primary teacher, nurse, youth, blind welfare training institutes. It also has a co-operative institute, a horticulture research institute. There are 17 primary schools and 7 community and satellite schools, in addition to 16 kindergartens. In total, there are 42 madrasas.

== Notable people ==
- Bajloor Rashid MBE, businessman and former president of the Bangladesh Caterers Association UK.
- Saifur Rahman, longest serving Finance Minister of Bangladesh.
- Syed Abdul Majid CIE, first native minister of Assam, pioneer of the agricultural industry
- Syed Qudratullah, founder of Moulvibazar
- Rangalal Sen, National Professor of Bangladesh.
- Syed Mohsin Ali, Former Member of the Jatiya Sangsad from Moulvibazar-3, Former Bangladesh Minister of Social Welfare and former President of Moulvibazar District Unit of Awami League.
- Hosne Ara Wahid, Member of Parliament, lived in Moulvibazar.

== See also ==
- Thanas of Bangladesh
- Upazilas of Bangladesh
- Districts of Bangladesh
- Divisions of Bangladesh
