= Mansurnagar Union =

Mansurnagar Union মনসুরনগর ইউনিয়ন
- Union Council
- No. 8 Mansurnagar Union Council
- Motto(s): Bengali: ছায়ায় সুনিবিড় শান্তির নীড়, romanized: Chhayay shunibiṛ shantir nīṛ, lit. 'Deep in the shadow, a nest of peace'
- Location in Bangladesh
- Country: Bangladesh
- Division: Sylhet Division
- District: Moulvibazar District
- Upazila: Rajnagar Upazila
- Founder: Dewan Abd al-Mansur

Population
  - Total: 37,323
- Demonym: Mansurnagari
- Time zone: UTC+6 (BST)
- Website: munsurnagarup.moulvibazar.gov.bd

Mansurnagar Union (Bengali: মনসুরনগর ইউনিয়ন) is a Union Parishad under Rajnagar Upazila of Moulvibazar District in the division of Sylhet, Bangladesh. It has an area of 15 square kilometres and a population of 37,323.

== History ==
After the Conquest of Sylhet in 1303, Shah Jalal's companion, Shah Ruknuddin built an eidgah in Kadamhata, Ita Pargana. Ruknuddin's mazar remains in Kadamhata near Kulaura Road.

Mansurnagar (the city of Mansur) was founded by Dewan Abd al-Mansur, the eldest son of Abd al-Majid. Abd al-Majid was the great grandson of Haji Khan - who was the son of Raja Subid Narayan, the final king of the Ita Kingdom who was defeated by Khwaja Usman in 1612. Mansurnagar was established following Mansur's emigration from his father's place in Balidighir Par. Mansur built his own house in a place which came to be known as Mansurnagar, and he had two sons by the name of Abd al-Muzaffar and Abul Fazal. Fazal remained built a house just north of Mansurnagar, in what is now the village of Madhipur. This Madhipur home remains in existence with no residents. The pond next to Fazal's home is also still there and is known as Fazal's pond.

== Demography ==
Mansurnagar has a population of 37,323.

== Administration ==
Mansurnagar constitutes the no. 8 union council of Moulvibazar Sadar Upazila. The first union chairman was the son of Zamindar Maulvi Monohor Chowdhuri, Abdul Mannan Chowdhuri. It contains 32 villages and 20 mouzas.

=== Villages ===
- Jauwa, Banarai, Bisoinkirti, Tarachung, Shorokhnogor, Binayasri, Muraura
- Mansurnagar, Pancheshwar, Bonomali Poncheshwor, Borkapon, Taharlamu
- Katajuri, Gabindbati, Hariyarai, Fakirtula, Chhikka, Madhipur, Balisohosro
- Chatura, Gabindasri, Shashmahal, Uttar Mahalal, Dakshin Mahalal, Vanurmahal
- Parachakra, Bakshikona, Premnagar, Malikona, Ashrakapon, Kadamhata, Dhaishar

== Economy and tourism ==
Mansurnagar has a small number of British immigrants contributing to its economy. It has five bazaars including Choudhury Bazaar and Mahalal Bazaar.

== Education ==
The Union has a literacy rate of 60% according to the 2011 Bangladesh census.

=== Primary ===
It has 17 state primary schools and 3 private primary school.

=== Religious ===
There are seven madrasas.

== Language and culture ==
The native population converse in their native Sylheti dialect but can also converse in Standard Bengali. Languages such as Arabic and English are also taught in schools.
