= Sylhet Government Women's College =

Colleges in Sylhet District

Coordinates: 24.3811°N 91.4110°E

Sylhet Govt. Women's College (Bengali: সিলেট সরকারি মহিলা কলেজ)is an academy located in Sylhet, Bangladesh. It was established in 1939 and makes important contributions in field of women's studies in Bangladesh. Many alumni are now working at high levels in government and private institutions.

The college currently provides higher education in science and the arts. Since the 2009–2010 academic year, it has provided English lessons as well. The principal is Md. Hayatul Islam Akanjee, and the vice principal is Fahima Zinnurayen. As of 2013, there are 5013 students enrolled. The relevant Board of Education is the Sylhet Education Board. They are affiliated with Bangladesh National University.

There are three buildings situated in college area: the Arts Building, the Academic Building, and the Science Building. There are also two women's hostels for students who live far away from the college.

== Campus ==
The college has 4 acres of land of its own. There are three academic buildings consisting of three floors, one modern auditorium with a seating capacity of 600, and an administrative building. A library is situated at the arts building. The residential arrangement of the students includes five buildings with 360 accommodation, but more than 500 students reside at the hall. A principal's bungalow and hall superintendent's quarters are within the campus. This college has a commercial building with 16 shops, including a commercial bank which rents from the government.

In 2011, the college had the third best results in the Sylhet Division under the Board of Intermediate and Secondary Education, Sylhet.

== Faculties and departments ==
=== Faculty of Arts ===
- Department of Bengali
- Department of English
- Department of Islamic History and Culture
- Department of Philosophy
- Department of History

=== Faculty of Social Science ===
- Department of Economics
- Department of Political Science
- Department of Social Welfare
- Department of Home Economics

=== Faculty of Science ===
- Department of Physics
- Department of Chemistry
- Department of Mathematics
- Department of Botany
- Department of Zoology

== Notable alumni ==
- Hosne Ara Wahid, teacher, NGO manager, and politician
- Fatema Chowdhury Paru, politician
