= Azizur Rahman (Moulvibazar politician) =

Bangladeshi politician (1943–2020)

- আজিজুর রহমান

Member of Parliament for Moulvibazar-3
- In office 5 March 1991 – 24 November 1995
- Preceded by: Gias Uddin Chowdhury
- Succeeded by: Saifur Rahman
- In office 10 July 1986 – 6 December 1987
- Preceded by: Constituency created

Personal details
- Born: 26 September 1943 Moulvibazar, Bengal Presidency, British India
- Died: 18 August 2020 (aged 76) Dhaka, Bangladesh
- Cause of death: COVID-19
- Party: Bangladesh Awami League

Azizur Rahman (26 September 1943 – 18 August 2020) was a Bangladesh Awami League politician and a 2-term Jatiya Sangsad member representing the Moulvibazar-3 constituency. He received the 2020 Independence Day Award by the government of Bangladesh. He was Joint Secretary of Bangladesh Awami League.

== Career ==
Rahman was elected to parliament from Moulvibazar-3 as a Bangladesh Awami League candidate in 1986. He was again elected from Moulvibazar-3 as a Bangladesh Awami League candidate in 1991. He was a parliamentary whip and a joint general secretary of the Awami League central Committee. At the time of his death Rahman was the Chairman of Moulvibazar Zila Parishad.

== Death ==
Rahman died on 18 August 2020 in Bangabandhu Sheikh Mujib Medical University Hospital, due to COVID-19 during the COVID-19 pandemic in Bangladesh.
