= Bajloor Rashid =

Bangladeshi-born British restaurateur, philanthropist and humanitarian (born 1962)

Bajloor Rashid MBE
- বজলুর রশিদ
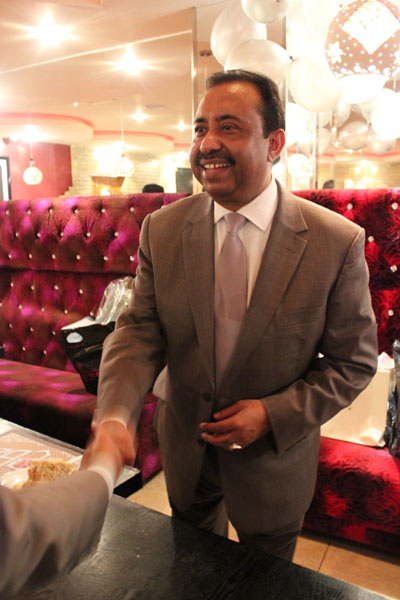
- Born: 28 May 1962 (age 63); Balikandi, Chandnighat, Moulvibazar, Sylhet, East Pakistan
- Citizenship: British
- Occupation: Restaurateur
- Years active: 1978–present
- Style: Bangladeshi/Indian Cuisine
- Spouse: Kaniz Fathema
- Website: bajloorrashid.com

Bajloor Rashid, MBE (Bengali: বজলুর রশিদ; born 28 May 1962) is a Bangladeshi-born British restaurateur, philanthropist and humanitarian. From 2006 to 2012, he was the president for the Bangladesh Caterers Association UK.

== Early life ==
Bajloor Rashid was born in the village of Balikandi, Chandnighat, Moulvibazar, Sylhet, East Pakistan (now Bangladesh). In 1978, he came to the United Kingdom to further his education.

== Business career ==
In 1980, Bajloor Rashid opened his first restaurant Curry Garden, in High Street, Dover. Between 1980 and 1993, Bajloor Rashid and his brother set up a number of restaurants in Kent and London. This gained him prominence in the early 1980s as a young entrepreneur in the curry industry, which led him to join the Bangladesh Caterers Association UK, the largest body of curry restaurant owners. Bajloor Rashid has property investments, owning a number of commercial buildings. In 1993, he was also involved in a wholesale business, selling rice and spices.

From 2006 to 2012, Bajloor Rashid served as the National President for the Bangladesh Caterers Association. He established the BCA Awards and under his presidency (2007–2011), there were five annual awards. As a result of this the BCA Awards gained industry recognition.

In April 2008, Bajloor Rashid was at the forefront of the Trafalgar Square demonstration, which was attended by tens of thousands of people. This led to a debate in the House of Commons about immigration rules. The demonstration was aimed at drawing government attention to the problems the curry industry had over skilled chefs being included in the shortage occupation list of the UK Border Agency.

Bajloor Rashid is known for building up a substantial support network of agencies, working closely with the UK Government, members of Parliament, UKBA, MAC and the Police. He was also a senior director of the British Bangladesh Chamber of Commerce which was created in 1991. He is a chairman or director of 20 companies.

In September 2013, he was elected as Chairman of the Progressive Life Insurance Company.

In 2014, he became Founding President of the UK Bangladesh Catalysts of Commerce and Industry (UKBCCI), a post he held until July 2020. He is now a Director of the UKBCCI. Bajloor Rashid was a key business figure in setting up this new chamber of commerce based in London. The UKBCCI is a leading umbrella organisation for successful British-Bangladeshi entrepreneurs in the UK and Bangladesh. As President of the UKBCCI, he was also the driving force behind the setting up of the UKBCCI Business & Entrepreneur Excellence Awards in 2016.

== Community activities ==
Bajloor Rashid has been involved in assisting the plight of communities affected by some of the world's worst natural disasters such as Cyclone Sidr. He is a member of various community organizations.

== Awards and recognition ==
In 2012, Bajloor Rashid was appointed a Member of the Order of the British Empire (MBE) in the 2012 New Year Honours. for his services to the catering industry. In 2012, he was included in the British Bangladeshi Power 100, a list which claims to represent "leading figures ... influencing the Bangladesh community and Britain". The following year he was awarded first place in the Community Personality category in the BB Power 100 Awards 2013. He has been recognised in the BB100 Awards 2016 and 2017 in the Networks and Associations category. In 2014, he was given an award by the British Bangladeshi Who's Who. Channel S Television awarded him Business Personality of the year in 2013.

== Personal life ==
Bajloor Rashid is married and has four children.

== See also ==
- British Bangladeshi
- Business of British Bangladeshis
- List of British Bangladeshis
