= Ali Amjad Government Girls' High School =

- আলী আমজাদ সরকারী বালিকা উচ্চ বিদ্যালয়

Location
- Moulvibazar; Bangladesh; 24.4921°N 91.7732°E

Information
- Former name: Ali Amjad Jubilee Girls' High School
- Type: Public secondary school
- Established: 1932
- School board: Board of Intermediate and Secondary Education, Sylhet
- Grades: 6-10
- Gender: Girls
- Enrollment: 1,100
- Campus size: 2.07 acres (0.84 ha)
- Website: aliamzadgghsmb.edu.bd

Ali Amjad Government Girls' High School (Bengali: আলী আমজাদ সরকারী বালিকা উচ্চ বিদ্যালয়) is a public secondary school in Moulvibazar, Bangladesh. Founded in 1932 as the private Ali Amjad Jubilee Girls' High School, it was provincialised in 1968. As of the 2021-2022 school year, it had an enrollment of 1,100 girls in grades 6 through 10.

== History ==
The descendants of Ali Amjad Khan donated 0.84 acres (0.34 ha) for the school. It was founded in 1932 as the private Ali Amjad Jubilee Girls' High School.

When the school outgrew its original site, other philanthropists donated an additional 1.23 acres (0.50 ha), which became the school's new campus. In 1962, the school opened the Al-Haj Keramat Ali Girls' Hostel.

The school was provincialised in 1968. At the time, the expenditure of 350,000 Pakistani rupees ($73,500 in 1968) was approved for new construction, but two years later ground had yet to be broken. The Pakistan Observer reported that the hostel was in a "very deplorable condition". The headmistress was residing in a room of the science building because of the dilapidated state of her official accommodation. Classroom space was so limited that many pupils had to be turned away. The school also suffered from a teacher shortage for several years after provincialisation. In February 1971, one-third of its teaching positions were unfilled.

During the Bangladesh Liberation War, the school was used as a Pakistan Army camp.

All activities of the school were transferred to the new campus in 1980. Four years later, the Manu River flooded, destroying many of the library's books.

== Academics ==
As of the 2021-2022 school year, it had an enrollment of 1,100 girls in grades 6 through 10. It operates under the Board of Intermediate and Secondary Education, Sylhet.

== Campus ==
The school's 2.07 acres (0.84 ha) campus is south of the Manu River, on Girls School Rd in Moulvibazar, a district headquarters in Bangladesh. The school has three two-story academic buildings and an administrative building.
