= Ahad Miah =

Bangladeshi politician (died 2021)

Member of Parliament for Moulvibazar-4
- In office 15 April 1988 – 6 December 1990
- Preceded by: Mohammad Elias
- Succeeded by: Md. Abdus Shahid

Personal details
- Born: c. 1936
- Died: 8 November 2021 (aged 84–85) Dhaka, Bangladesh
- Party: Jatiya Party (Ershad)

Ahad Miah (c. 1936 – 8 November 2021) was a Jatiya Party (Ershad) politician in Bangladesh and a Jatiya Sangsad member representing the Moulvibazar-4 constituency from 1988 to 1991.

== Career ==
Miah was elected to parliament from Moulvibazar-4 as a Jatiya Party candidate in 1988.
