= Gias Uddin Chowdhury =

Bangladeshi politician

Member of Bangladesh Parliament
- In office 1988–1991

Personal details
- Party: Jatiya Party (Ershad)

Gias Uddin Chowdhury is a Jatiya Party (Ershad) politician in Bangladesh and a former member of parliament for Moulvibazar-3.

== Career ==
Chowdhury was elected to parliament from Moulvibazar-3 as a Jatiya Party candidate in 1988.
