= Kanakpur Union =

Kanakpur Union কনকপুর ইউনিয়ন
- Union Council
- No. 8 Kanakpur Union Council
- Location in Bangladesh
- Country: Bangladesh
- Division: Sylhet Division
- District: Moulvibazar District
- Upazila: Moulvibazar Sadar Upazila

Government
  - Union Parishad Chairman: Rubel uddin

Population
  - Total: 18,458
- Demonym(s): Kanakpuri, Konokpuri
- Time zone: UTC+6 (BST)
- Website: konokpurup.moulvibazar.gov.bd

Kanakpur Union (Bengali: কনকপুর ইউনিয়ন) is a union parishad under Moulvibazar Sadar Upazila of Moulvibazar District in the division of Sylhet, Bangladesh. It has an area of 23.5 square kilometres and a population of 18,458.

== History ==
The etymology of the union is of two words; "Kanak" and "Pur". The word Kanak comes from Sanskrit and means gold or possibly imitative of clanking metal. The word Pur is also from Sanskrit and means city. Therefore, the literal translation would be the city of gold.

== Geography ==
Kanakpur Union is located in the part of Moulvibazar Sadar Upazila and shares borders with the Mostafapur Union in the east. It has an area of 23.5 square kilometres.

== Demography ==
Kanakpur has a population of 18,458.

== Administration ==
Kanakpur constitutes the no. 8 union council of Moulvibazar Sadar Upazila. It contains 49 villages.

=== Villages ===
- Haridatta, Shaoniya, Abda, Bachandar, Satyapur, Barhal, Halgar
- Rakha, Nagra, Audatta, Ballabhdatta, Bhadgaon, Binshona, Rangdas
- Kobiraji, Dojbali, Poilpara, Chondibhandar, Buddhimontopur, Khagrakandi, Bagmara
- Maijpara, Kandipara, Bidya'r Mahal, Islampur, Damiya, Fatehpur, Durlabhpur
- Dattabinshona, Banidhupi, Dvipiya, Thekshaliya, Harmahal, Dhoupasha, Khasharikona
- Doliya, Srirampur, Srirainagar, Poton, Bajekrati, Kanakpur
- Shariya, Goyghor, Noldariya, Rajapur, Borkapon, Raypur, Mamrokpur, Nandiura

== Economy and tourism ==
It has two bazaars.

== Education ==
The union has a literacy rate of 56.61%.

=== Primary ===
It has 14 state primary schools and 1 private primary school. They are as follows:

1. Bhadgaon Government Primary School
2. Buddhimontopur Government Primary School
3. Damiya Abda Government Primary School
4. Raypur Mamrokpur Government Primary School
5. Naldariya Government Primary School
6. Kanakpur Government Primary School
7. Durlavpur Government Primary School
8. Haridatta Government Primary School
9. Binshona Government Primary School
10. Dipiya Government Primary School
11. Baro Haal Government Primary School
12. Fatehpur Government Primary School
13. Shah Bondor Government Primary School
14. Sardar Bari Reg. Primary School

It also has 3 kindergartens: Sunrise KG School, Shah Jalal KG School and Srirainagar KG School

=== Secondary ===
It has one high school called Bhadgaon Taher un-Nessa High School.

=== Religious ===
There are six madrasas and they are as follows:

1. Bhadgaon Imdad ul-Uloom Madrasa
2. Buddhimontopur Muhyi us-Sunnah Dakhil Madrasa
3. Buddhimontopur Hafizia Madrasa
4. Damiya Hafizia Madrasa
5. Raypur Mamrokpur Title Madrasa
6. Shah Bondor Madrasa

== Language and culture ==
The native population converse in their native Sylheti dialect but can also converse in Standard Bengali. Languages such as Arabic and English are also taught in schools. The union has 47 mosques:

1. Borkapon Jame Masjid and Rajapur Satyapur Borkapon Jame Masjid
2. North Bhadgaon Jame Masjid, West Bhadgaon Jame Masjid, South Bhadgaon Jame Masjid, Bhadgaon Bakhsh Bari Jame Masjid and Bhadgaon Sardar Bari Jame Masjid
3. Chok Rajpur Jame Masjid
4. Islampur Jame Masjid
5. Bagmara Jame Masjid
6. Khagrakandi Jame Masjid
7. Buddhimontopur Jame Masjid and West Buddhimontopur Jame Masjid
8. Abda Bazar Jame Masjid, North Abda Jame Masjid and Rajapur Abda Jame Masjid
9. Damiya Jame Masjid and Damiya Shah Murad Jame Masjid
10. Bochondhor Jame Masjid
11. Raypur Jame Masjid
12. Mamrokpur Jame Masjid
13. Noldariya Jame Masjid
14. North Kanakpur Jame Masjid and Kanakpur Bus Stand Jame Masjid
15. Durlavpur Jame Masjid
16. Shah Bandar Jame Masjid
17. Srirampur Jame Masjid and Srirampur Panjegana Masjid
18. Rakha Jame Masjid, Rakha Peer Bari Jame Masjid and Rakha Master Motin Bari Panjegana Masjid
19. Nagra Jame Masjid
20. Rangdas Jame Masjid
21. Kabiraji Jame Masjid
22. Binshona Jame Masjid, Binshona Master Yusuf Bari Panjegana Masjid, Dattabinshona Panjegana Masjid and Binshona Rezaq Ullah Bari Panjegana Masjid
23. Syed Abdul Hamid Waqf Estate and Panjegana Masjid
24. Poton Panjegana Masjid
25. Halgor Panjegana Masjid
26. Srirainagar Panjegana Masjid
27. Poilpara Al-Khair Panjegana Masjid
28. Audatta Panjegana Masjid
29. Dhoupasha Panjegana Masjid
30. Dipiya Panjegana Masjid
31. Maijpara Ashroyon Prokolpo Panjegana Masjid

It also has 9 eidgahs:

1. Bhadgaon Eidgah
2. Bochbondor Eidgah
3. Buddhimontopur Eidgah
4. Naldariya Eidgah
5. Kanakpur Eidgah
6. Durlavpur Eidgah
7. Rakha Eidgah
8. Dipiya Eidgah
9. Shahbondor Eidgah

== List of chairmen ==
List of chairmen
| Number | Name | Term |
|---|---|---|
| 01 | Abu Bakr | April 1984 - June 1988 |
| 02 | Muhammad Salamat Ali | July 1988 - February 1992 |
| 03 | Muhammad Fazlur Rahman Ghani | March 1992 - January 1998 |
| 04 | Kamal Ahmad | February 1998 - 17 October 2011 |
| 05 | Mamunur Rashid Chowdhury | 17 October 2011 - 16 October 2016 |
| 06 | Rezaur Rahman Chowdhury | 2016–2021 |
| 07 | Rubel Uddin | 2021–present |
