= Mohammad Elias =

Bangladeshi politician

- মোহাম্মদ ইলিয়াস

Member of Bangladesh Parliament
- In office 1986–1987
- Succeeded by: Ahad Miah

Personal details
- Party: Bangladesh Muslim League

Mohammad Elias is a Bangladesh Muslim League politician and a former member of parliament for Moulvibazar-4.

== Career ==
Elias was elected to parliament from Moulvibazar-4 as a Bangladesh Muslim League candidate in 1986.
