= Shafiqur Rahman (Moulvibazar politician) =

Bangladeshi politician

Member of Parliament for Moulvibazar-4
- In office February 1996 – June 1996
- Preceded by: Md. Abdus Shahid
- Succeeded by: Md. Abdus Shahid

Personal details
- Born: 10 February 1959
- Died: 19 February 2009
- Political party: Bangladesh Nationalist Party

Shafiqur Rahman (10 February 1959 – 19 February 2009) was a Bangladesh Nationalist Party politician and a member of parliament for Moulvibazar-4.

== Career ==
Rahman was elected to parliament from Moulvibazar-4 as a Bangladesh Nationalist Party candidate in February 1996.
