= A.A.T.M. Multilateral High School =

Coordinates: 24.3838°N 91.8980°E

- Shamsher Nagar, Kamalganj Upazila, Moulvibazar District, Bangladesh

Information
- School type: Public School
- Founded: 1929
- Founder: Haji Ustwar
- Gender: Co-Educational
- Language: Bengali

A.A.T.M. Multilateral High School (Bengali: এ.এ.টি.এম বহুমুখী উচ্চ বিদ্যালয়) is a secondary school situated in Shamsher Nagar, Kamalganj Upazila, Moulvibazar District, Bangladesh. It was established in 1929 as ME Madrasa by the late Haji Mohammad Ustwar. The madrasa was upgraded to a high school in 1960. It is now named after Abbas Ali Tale Mohammad, abbreviated as A.A.T.M. The late Khurshed Ahmed was the first student who passed matriculation from this school.
