= Hosne Ara Wahid =

Bangladeshi politician (1955–2020)

Husna Ara Wahid
- হোসনে আরা ওয়াহিদ

Member of the Bangladesh Parliament for Reserved Women's Seat-39
- In office 14 July 1996 – 13 July 2001
- Preceded by: Position established
- Succeeded by: Fahima Hossain Jubly

Personal details
- Born: 28 February 1955 Moulvibazar, East Bengal, Dominion of Pakistan
- Died: 6 April 2020 (aged 65) Moulvibazar, Bangladesh
- Education: Moulavibazar Government College
- Occupation: Politician

Hosne Ara Wahid (28 February 1955 – 6 April 2020) was a Bangladeshi secondary school teacher, NGO manager, and Awami League politician who served as Member of Parliament (MP) for the 39th seat reserved for women from 1996 to 2001.

== Early life and career ==
Wahid was born on 28 February 1955 in Moulvibazar to her parents Abdul Mofiz and Ambia Khatun. She is the eldest of eight children, with five brothers and two sisters. Her father was a Pakistani Civil serviceman who died during the 1982 flood in Bangladesh. She passed her Secondary School Certificate (SSC) group science in 1969 from Sylhet Government Girls High School when her father was in Sylhet for his job. Her Higher Secondary School Certificate (HSC) was completed at the Sylhet Government Women's College in 1972. After that her father returned to Moulvibazar where she completed her bachelor's degree in science in 1975 from the Moulvibazar Government College.

In 1983, Wahid joined Pathfinder, an International NGO which works for family planning and child welfare in Bangladesh, funded by United States Agency for International Development. She worked there as a project manager for 13 years. In 1996, she was selected as a member of Parliament for five years. She visited several countries on behalf of the NGO and of the Bangladesh Government, and addressed the United Nations General Assembly Third Committee (SOCHUM).

She was also a secondary school teacher, Sr Vice president of Moulvibazar District Awami League, vice chair of the Moulvibazar district Red Crescent Society, and a life member of the Moulvibazar Press Club.

== Personal life ==
In 1977, she married Abdul Wahid, who was the former General Secretary of the Moulvibazar District Awami League. They have four children, two boys, two girls.

Hosne Ara Wahid died on 6 April 2020 in Moulvibazar, Bangladesh.
