= Md. Abdus Shahid =

Bangladeshi politician

Mohammed Abdus Shahid
- মোঃ আব্দুস শহীদ
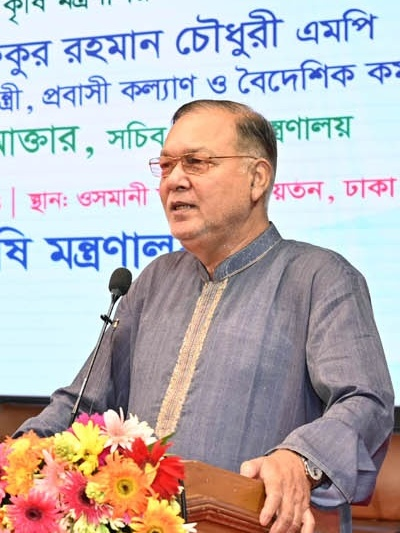
- Abdus Shahid addressing at a seminar on 7 July 2024

Minister of Agriculture
- In office 11 January 2024 – 6 August 2024
- Preceded by: Mohammad Abdur Razzaque
- Succeeded by: Jahangir Alam Chowdhury

Member of the Bangladesh Parliament for Moulvibazar-4
- In office 14 July 1996 – 6 August 2024
- Preceded by: Shafiqur Rahman
- In office 5 March 1991 – 24 November 1995
- Preceded by: Ahad Miah
- Succeeded by: Shafiqur Rahman

9th Chief Whip of Jatiya Sangsad
- In office 25 January 2009 – 24 January 2014
- Speaker: Mohammad Abdul Hamid; Shirin Sharmin Chaudhury
- Preceded by: Khandaker Delwar Hossain
- Succeeded by: A. S. M. Feroz

Personal details
- Born: 1 January 1948 (age 78) Sylhet, East Bengal, Dominion of Pakistan
- Party: Bangladesh Awami League

Mohammed Abdus Shahid (born 1 January 1948) is a Bangladesh Awami League politician and a former minister of agriculture of Bangladesh. He also served as a member of the Jatiya Sangsad seven consecutive times representing the Moulvibazar-4 constituency. He was the former chief whip of the ruling party in the 9th parliament.

== Early life ==
Abdus Shahid was born on 1 January 1948. He has a master's degree in communication.

== Career ==
Shahid was elected to parliament in 1991 from Moulvibazar-4 as a candidate of the Awami League. He received 75,321 votes while his nearest rival, Ahad Miah of the Jatiya Party, received 60,215.

Shahid was re-elected to parliament in June 1996 from Moulvibazar-4 as a candidate of the Awami League. He received 91,811 votes while his nearest rival, Ahad Miah of the Jatiya Party, received 59,825.

Shahid was re-elected to parliament in 2001 from Moulvibazar-4 as a candidate of the Awami League. He received 96,329 votes while his nearest rival, independent candidate Mujibur Rahman Chowdhury, received 70,364. He was the appointed the chief whip of the opposition when the Awami League was the opposition party.

Shahid was re-elected to parliament in 2008 from Moulvibazar-4 as a candidate of the Awami League. He received 131,740 votes while his nearest rival, Bangladesh Nationalist Party candidate Mujibur Rahman Chowdhury, received 79,599. In his wealth statement he stated he made around 200 thousand as a businessman and chairman of Global Link Limited. He was appointed chief whip of the Jatiya Sangshad.

Shahid was elected unopposed the 2014 election from Moulvibazar-4 as a candidate of the Awami League as it was boycotted by opposition parties.

Shahid was re-elected to parliament in 2018 from Moulvibazar-4 as a candidate of the Awami League. He received 211,613 votes while his nearest rival, Bangladesh Nationalist Party candidate Md Mozibur Rahman Chowdhury, received 93,295. He was a member of the Parliamentary standing committee on the Ministry of Finance. He laid the foundation stone of a new academic building of Abul Fazal Chowdhury High School in 2018 but construction could not be completed by 2023.

Shahid was re-elected to parliament in 2024 from Moulvibazar-4 as a candidate of the Awami League. He was appointed the Minister of Agriculture. He warned against corruption after assuming his office.

Shahid was arrested after the fall of the Sheikh Hasina led Awami League government in October 2024. He was placed in four day remand in a case filed over the death of a bus driver in anti-Hasina protest on 5 August. The Anti-Corruption Commission began an investigation against Shahid.
