= Educational Institute Identification Number =

Unique identifier for Bangladeshi educational institutions

Educational Institute Identification Number (EIIN) is a unique identifier for secondary and higher secondary schools, university affiliated colleges, universities, technical institutes and alia madrasahs of Bangladesh issued by the Bangladesh Bureau of Educational Information and Statistics, which is part of the Bangladeshi Ministry of Education. (Note: Multiple references:)

EIIN is not used for registered kindergartens and primary schools. In this case, the EIMS number is used as a identifier. Institutions like medical and nursing colleges, Institutes of Health Technology and Medical Assistant Training Schools which are controlled by the Directorate General of Medical Education (DGME) and unregistered institutions like qawmi madrasas do not have EIIN.

EIIN is used as a identifier in Wikipedia and Wikidata.
