= Rajnagar Upazila =

Rajnagar রাজনগর
- Upazila
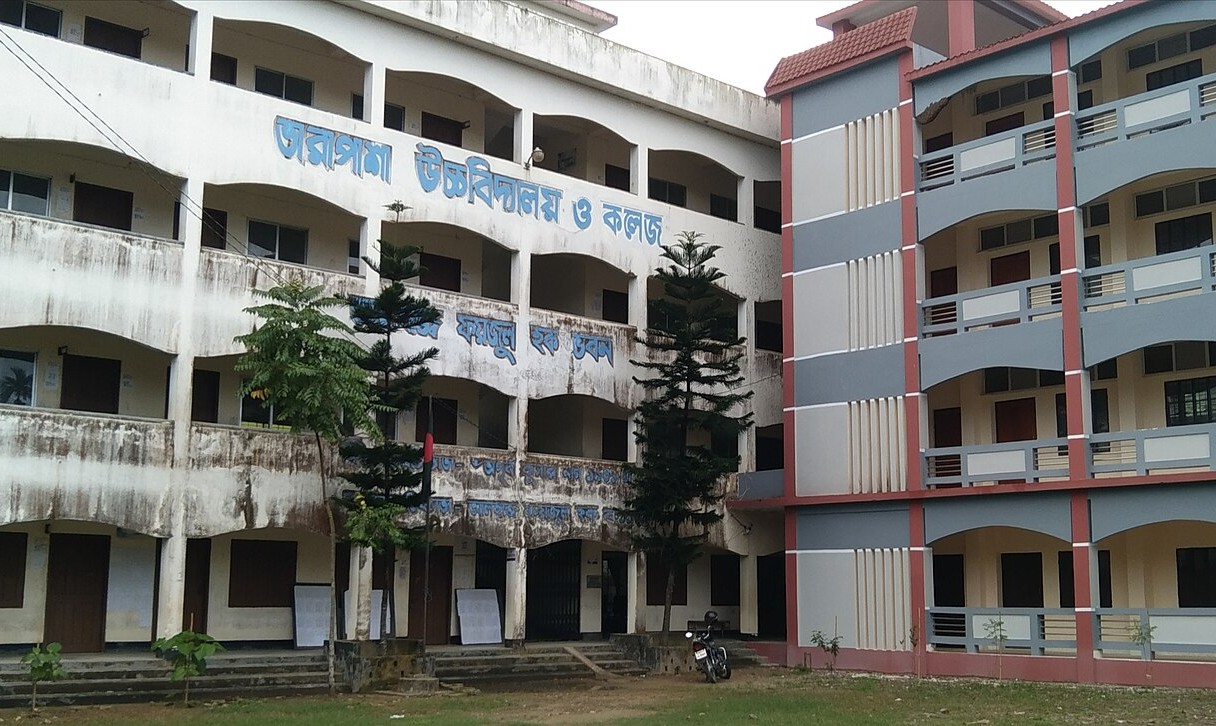
- Tarapasha High School and College
- Nickname: City of the King
- Country: Bangladesh
- Division: Sylhet
- District: Moulvibazar

Government
  - MP (Moulvibazar-3): Mohammad Zillur Rahman (Bangladesh Awami League)
  - Upazila Chairman: Shahjahan Khan (Awami League)

Area
  - Total: 338.15 km^{2} (130.56 sq mi)

Population (2022)
  - Total: 250,806
  - Density: 741.70/km^{2} (1,921.0/sq mi)
- Demonym(s): Rajnagari, Rajnogori, Raznogori
- Time zone: UTC+6 (BST)
- Postal code: 3240
- Area code: 0861
- Website: rajnagar.moulvibazar.gov.bd

Rajnagar Upazila mauza geocode map

Rajnagar (Bengali: রাজনগর) is an upazila of the Moulvibazar District in Sylhet Division, Bangladesh. The district has roughly 43,070 houses and an area of approximately 340 km^{2}. There are three well-known rivers which flow across the Upazila border side of Rajnagar: the Kushiara in the North, the Manu across the southern three unions (Kamarchak, Tengrabazar, and Mansurnager), and the Dholai across Kamarchak and the southern border.

== Etymology ==
The name of the city, Rajnagar is derived from two words, Raj and nagar, meaning "City of the King". It possibly refers to the kings of the ancient Ita kingdom wherein Rajnagar was the capital.

== History ==
It is suggested that the area was inhabited by Buddhists and Hindus as evidence from inscriptions suggests there was an ancient university in Panchgaon, Rajnagar. The terrain was headquarters of the ancient Ita Kingdom founded by Raja Bhanu Narayan and its capital was in the villages of Bhumiura and Eolatoli.. Copper plates have been found from 930 AD in Paschimbagh, Tengubazar Mandir, Rajnagar. The district was also part of the ancient Kamarupa kingdom. In the mid-14th century, Shah Ruknuddin settled and propagated Islam in Kadamhata, Ita Pargana. Ruknuddin's mazar remains in Kadamhata Bazar.

Rajnagar contains many tea gardens and historical places. During the Bangladesh Liberation War, the Panchgaon Factory in Rajnagar Upazila produced cannons under the command of M. A. G. Osmani. A famous historical cannon, nicknamed Jahankosa, built by Janardan Karmakar remains in display in Dhaka. The first Upazila Chairman Freedom Fighter Rana Choudhury is the founder of Rajnagar Degree College (Principal Abdul Ahad Choudhury founded the college in 1982); Major General Abdu Rab is the co-founder of that college. The present Upazila Chairman is Freedom Fighter Md. Askir Khan of the Ruling Party Awamileague. For the last two terms Md. Misbahuduzza (Velai) of Awamileague has been the Upazila Chairman of Rajnagar. Munshibazar is one of the most important commercial unions in this Upazila due to the large number of goods and services. The tea gardens produce plenty of different types of tea and fruit as well. It has big Hawrs and hills that makes it unique one in the upazilla.

== Demographics ==
Religions in Rajnagar Upazila (2022)
Religion	Percent
Islam	77.98%
Hinduism	21.95%
Other or not stated	0.07%

According to the 2022 Bangladeshi census, Rajnagar Upazila had 52,294 households and a population of 250,806. 9.36% of the population were under 5 years of age. Rajnagar had a literacy rate (age 7 and over) of 75.30%: 76.30% for males and 74.44% for females, and a sex ratio of 88.48 males for every 100 females. 17,210 (6.86%) lived in urban areas. Ethnic population is 1805 (0.72%).

According to the 2011 Census of Bangladesh, Rajnagar Upazila had 43,070 households and a population of 232,666. 60,790 (26.13%) were under 10 years of age. Rajnagar had a literacy rate (age 7 and over) of 48.62%, compared to the national average of 51.8%, and a sex ratio of 1056 females per 1000 males. 14,134 (6.07%) lived in urban areas. Ethnic population was 1,788 (0.77%).

As of the 1991 Bangladesh census, Rajnagar has a population of 174280. Males constitute are 50.66% of the population, and females 49.34%. This Upazila's eighteen up population is 87249. Rajnagar has an average literacy rate of 27.2% (7+ years), and the national average of 32.4% literate.

== Administration ==
Rajnagar Upazila is divided into eight union parishads: Fatehpur, Kamarchak, Mansurnagar, Munshi Bazar, Panchgaon, Rajnagar, Tengra, and Uttarbhag. The union parishads are subdivided into 143 mauzas and 267 villages.

== Notable people ==
- Begum Serajunnessa Choudhury, businesswoman and politician, was born at Rajnagar in 1910.
- Dewan Abdul Basith, lawyer and politician, was born at Mansurnagar in 1911.

== See also ==
- Upazilas of Bangladesh
- Districts of Bangladesh
- Divisions of Bangladesh
- Thanas of Bangladesh
- Union councils of Bangladesh
- Administrative geography of Bangladesh
- Villages of Bangladesh
- Demographics of Bangladesh
