= Board of Intermediate and Secondary Education, Sylhet =

Autonomous Organisation

Coordinates: 24.897778°N 91.871389°E

The Board of Intermediate and Secondary Education, Sylhet
- Alompur, South Surma, Sylhet; Bangladesh

Information
- Established: 1999
- Website: sylhetboard.gov.bd

The Board of Intermediate and Secondary Education, Sylhet is an autonomous organization responsible for holding public examinations (JSC, S.S.C and H.S.C) in four districts of Sylhet Division. The board was established in 1999.

The present chairman of the board is PROF. MD. Anwar Hossain Chowdhury.

== District under Sylhet Education Board ==
- Habiganj District
- Moulvibazar District
- Sunamganj District
- Sylhet District

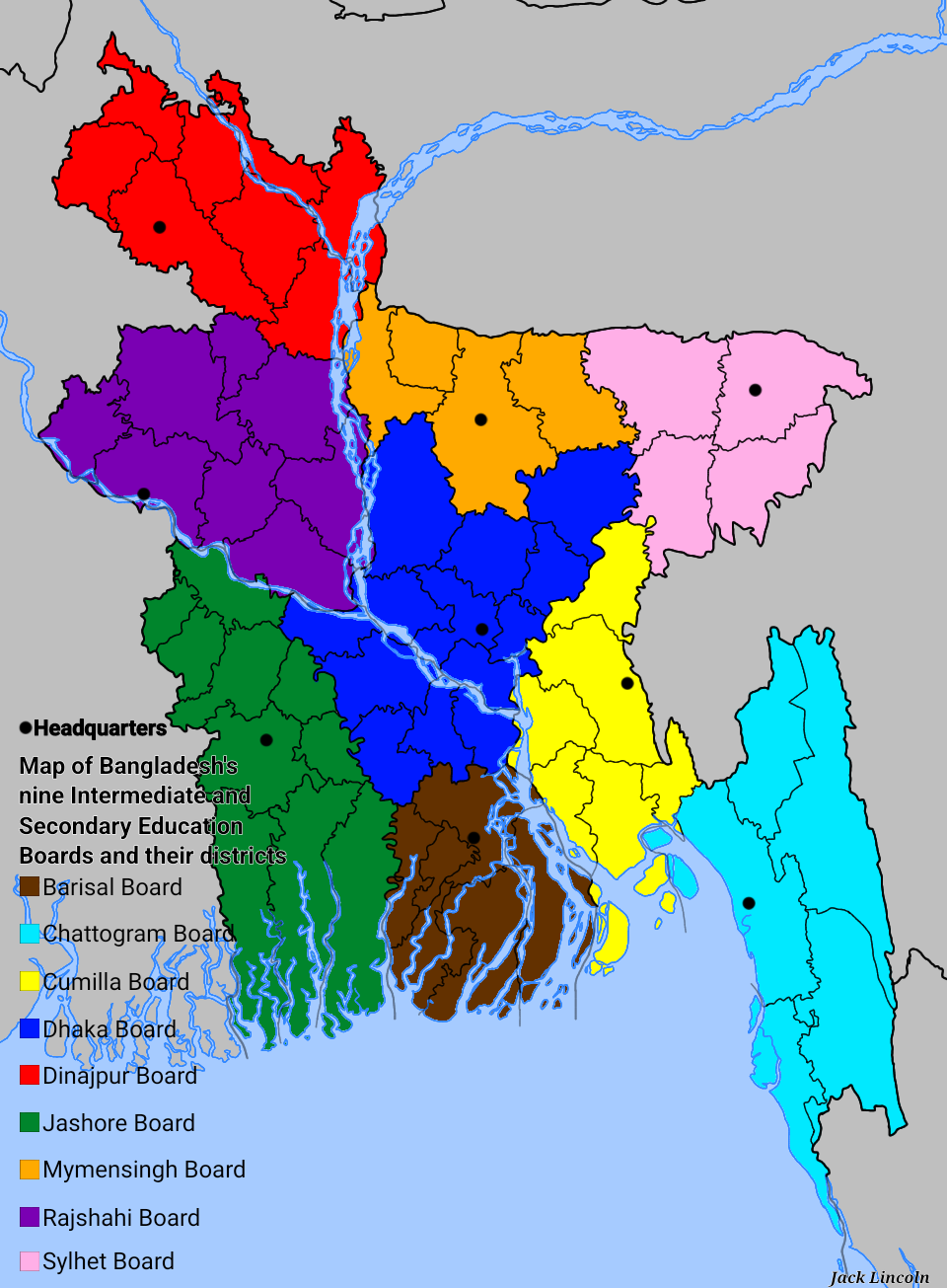
Map of Bangladesh's nine Intermediate and Secondary Education Boards and their districts

== Prominent educational institutions ==
- Sylhet Cadet College
- Dakshin Surma Govt. High School
- Reboti Romon DP High School, Moglabazar
- Jalalabad Cantonment Public School and College
- SCHOLARSHOME
- The Aided High School
- Sylhet Blue Bird High School and College
- Murari Chand College
- Sylhet Government Women's College
- Sylhet Government Pilot High School
- Silam P.L. Bohu Mukhi High School
- Moulvibazar Government High School

== See also ==
- List of Education Boards in Bangladesh
