= Moulvibazar =

Moulvibazar: মৌলভীবাজার
- Town
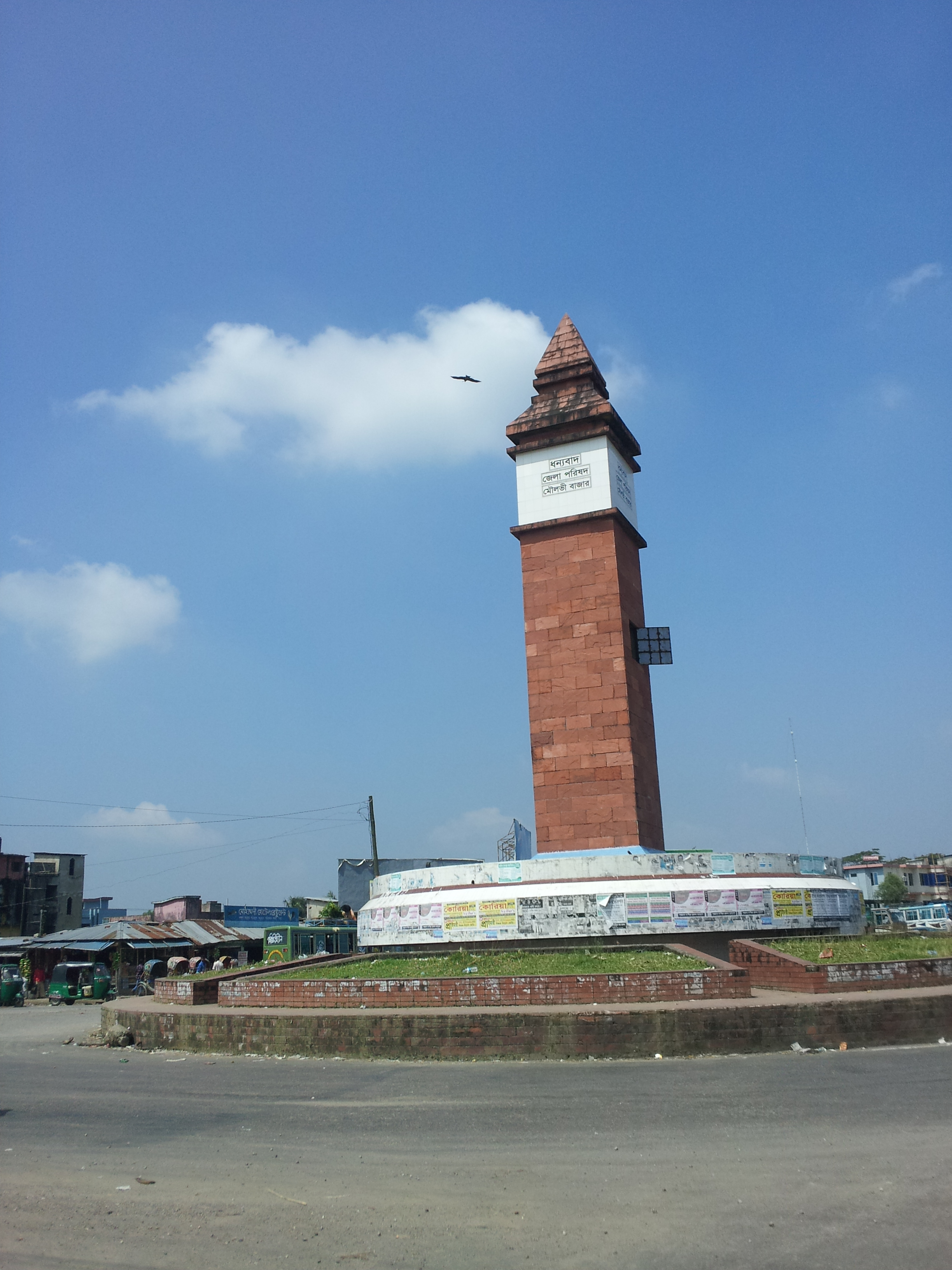
- The Welcome Square of Moulvibazar

- Moulvibazar in Sylhet division Moulvibazar in Bangladesh
- Coordinates: 24°29′10″N 91°46′35″E
- Country: Bangladesh
- Division: Sylhet
- District: Moulvibazar
- Upazila: Moulvibazar Sadar

Government
  - Municipality Mayor: Interim Government (Empty)

Area
  - Total: 10.36 km^{2} (4.00 sq mi)

Population (2022)
  - Total: 68,303
  - Density: 6,593/km^{2} (17,080/sq mi)
- Time zone: UTC+6 (BST)
- Post code: 3200

Moulvibazar (Bengali: মৌলভীবাজার), is a town in north-eastern Bangladesh just south of Sylhet. It is the capital of Moulvibazar Sadar Upazila and Moulvibazar District, and is located on the banks of the Manu River.

== History ==
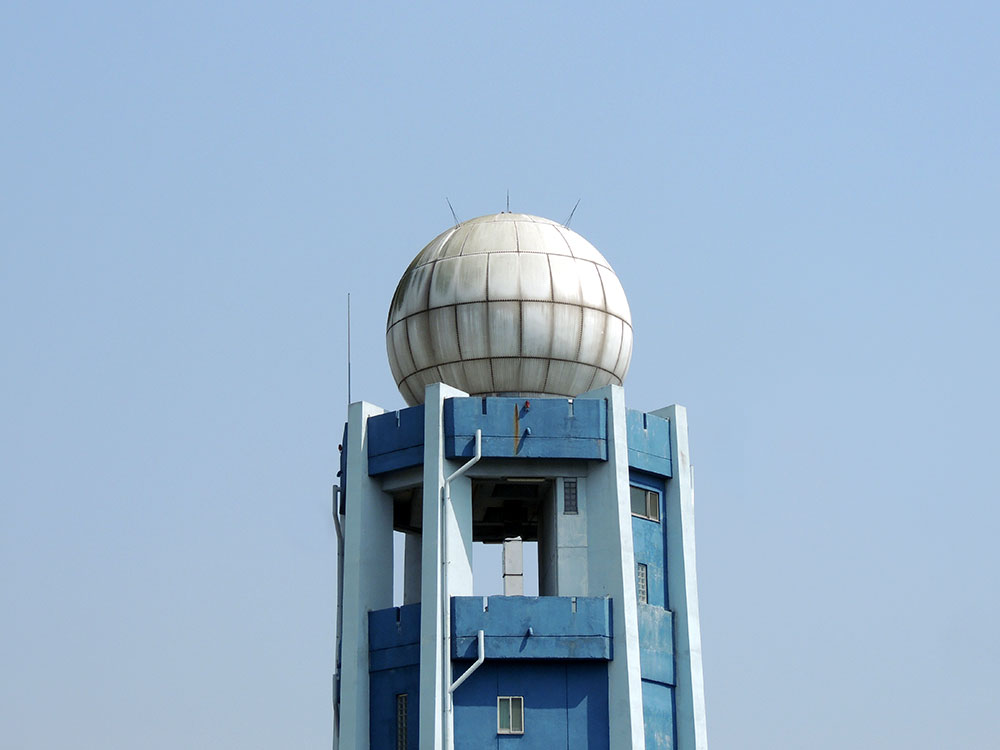
Moulvibazar weather station tower - a project initiated by JICA

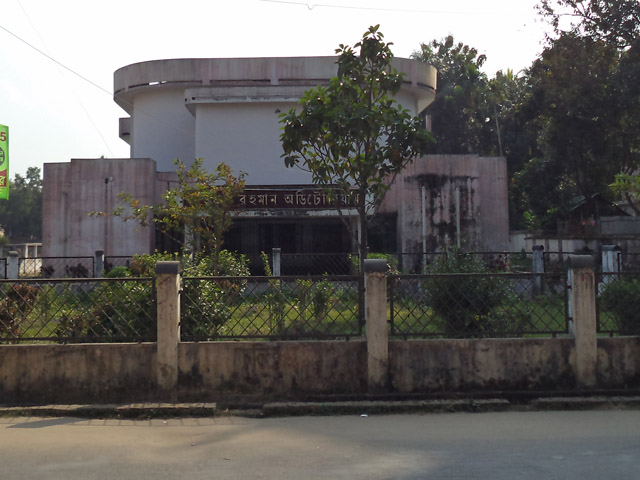
Saifur Rahman Auditorium

In 1771, Moulvi Syed Qudratullah established a bazaar near the banks of the Manu River using his zamindari land. He started importing edible goods, such as fruits and vegetables opening up opportunities for people to purchase as well as sell. The location allowed easy access through river and land transport. The bazaar became the headquarters of South Sylhet subdivision in 1882. In 1891, Moulvibazar Govt. High School, the central school of Moulvibazar was established. The anti-British Khilafat Movement in 1921 also spread to Moulvibazar and campaigners that were present included Chittaranjan Das, Hussain Ahmad Madani and Sarojini Naidu. In 1932, the Ali Amzad Government Girls' High School was opened as a public school.

During the Indo-Pakistani War of 1971 and Bangladesh War of Independence, the Pakistan Army moved its 313th Brigade from Sylhet to Moulvibazar and a battalion from the 313th was kept at Sylhet to form the nucleus of the 202nd ad hoc Brigade. On 20 December, a number of people were killed and wounded by mine explosions at the premises of the Moulvibazar Government High School.

On 22 February 1984, Moulvibazar became the headquarters of the newly established Moulvibazar Sadar Upazila, and Moulvibazar District was renamed from South Sylhet. In 2005, the Saifur Rahman Stadium was established here, acting as a multi-use arena fitting 15,000 people.

== Administration ==
The pourashava is made up of 9 wards:

- Ward 1: North Samoli, Banani, Shoiyarpur, Forest Office, Girzapara, Kashinath, Shamshernagar
- Ward 2: Borobari, Bonosree, Raghunandanpur, East Court, Circuit House, Mission Area, Shonapur, West Borshijura
- Ward 3: Arambag, Kalimabad, Noyagaon, Chubra, West Court
- Ward 4: Madhyapara, Shantibag, Muslim Quarter
- Ward 5: Berry Lake Char, Lakeview, Shahbag, Golbag, Paschim Bazar,
- Ward 6: Borohat, Kushumbag, Baroikona, Boliyarbag, Upazila Complex
- Ward 7: Dargah Mahalla, Kazirgaon, New Hospital, East Gavindasri, Sultanpur
- Ward 8: Darzir Mahal, Dhorkapon, Gavindasri, Sabuzbag
- Ward 9: Borkapon, Daarok, Sheikher Gaon, Khindur, North Mostafapur

== Demographics ==
Religions in Moulvibazar (2011)
Religion	Percent
Islam	83.31%
Hinduism	16.34%
Other or not stated	0.35%

According to the 2022 Bangladesh census, Moulvibazar city had a population of 68,303 and a literacy rate of 86.13%.

According to the 2011 Bangladesh census, Moulvibazar city had 10,840 households and a population of 56,537. 11,652 (20.61%) were under 10 years of age. Moulvibazar had a literacy rate (age 7 and over) of 65.03%, compared to the national average of 51.8%, and a sex ratio of 909 females per 1000 males. Ethnic population was 264 (0.47%).
