= Shaharsree =

Village in Bangladesh

Coordinates: 24.4290°N 91.6263°E

Shaharsree (Bengali: শহরশ্রী) is a village in Mirzapur Union, Sreemangal Upazila, Moulvibazar District, Sylhet Division, Bangladesh.

During the Mughal Rule was known as Pachawoon (Bengali: পাচাউন) Pargana' (Sub district or present time Upazilla).

The village contains the shrines of Shah Sadruddin Qureshi and Shah Badruddin Quraishi, preachers who came to Sreemangal in the early 13th century to spread the message of Islam in this region after Shah Jalal's Conquest of Sylhet in 1303; although many believe that they are one of 360 companions of him. They were born in Quraysh clan of Makkah. Their Dargah is also situated in this village, which is known as Kashiuna Dargah Sharif. Presently Dewan Masrur Ahmed Chowdhury is the President (Motowali) of this Dargah committee. Oros Mahfil of this dargah is observed on 8th Magh of Bengali calendar each year.

There are two mosques; West Shaharsree Jame Masjid and East Shaharsree Jame Masjid. The village also contains a madrasa. There is a cricket club in this village named Star Cricket Club, which is the only club in the Mirzapur Union.

Dewan Naziruddin Ahmed Chowdhury was one of the very aristocratic and renowned zamindars during the British Raj and was a descendant of one of the two saints. He donated vast land property for the welfare of the people and established religious centres like mosque, madrasa, eidgah, graveyard etc. The first mosque in the village, Shaharsree Jame Masjid with its adjoining eidgah was opened by Chowdhury donating his own land. Due to there being no Muslim graveyards in the village, he also established a graveyard in Shaharsree. One of his ancestors was also the private tutor to Maharaja of Tripura. Dewan Eunusuddin Ahmed Chowdhury, elder son of Dewan Naziruddin Ahmed Chowdhury was elected as the first Chairman of the Mirzapur Union Parishad in 1958.
