= G. indica =

G. indica may refer to:

- Garcinia indica, the kokum, a fruit tree species of culinary, pharmaceutical and industrial uses
- Gracula indica, the Southern Hill myna, a bird species

== See also ==
- Indica (disambiguation)
