= Lasubon canyon =

Canyon in Bangladesh

- Floor elevation: 1,640 ft (500 m)

Geography
- Location: Srimangal

Lasubon Canyon (Bengali: লাসুবন গিরিখাত) is an ancient canyon located about 25 km from Srimangal of Moulvibazar District. This canyon is situated in a densely forested hilly area of Sindurkhan Union, bordering the Indian state of Tripura. The word Lasubon in Khasi language means mountain flower or wildflower. Officially known as Lasubon canyon, it is widely referred to as Srimangal canyon by the local people. There are many small and big rocky ridges or jhiri in this canyon. It is known for the discovery of three major canyons in this area. These are popularly known as Krem Clue, Krem Kerri and Krem Ulka in the local Khasi language.

== Formation ==
Some of the gorges in Lasubon are one kilometer and some are less than that. There is a risk of going through the gorges as there is no way to climb on in case the water suddenly falls from the top while going down. Some places are steep stone wallswhere accidents may occur at any time. The gorge area is located within the local Nahar Khasia punji. The whole canyon area falls within Nahar Khasia Punji. The entire area can be explored by a hilly stream called Langulia chhora. This Langulia canal originates from Tripura in India and then enters Bangladesh. The stream crosses about 25 km and finally joins the Bilas Canal at Srimangal. There are hundreds of other small and large rocky canals joining the spiral stream. In which there are some canyons.

500 meters below the hill, these canyons are somewhere big and somewhere narrow in size. As a result, the sunlight is hard to reach in the bottom or inner part of the canyons. Locals refer to it as Ulka. Even without rain, big drops of water constantly fall from the rocks.
