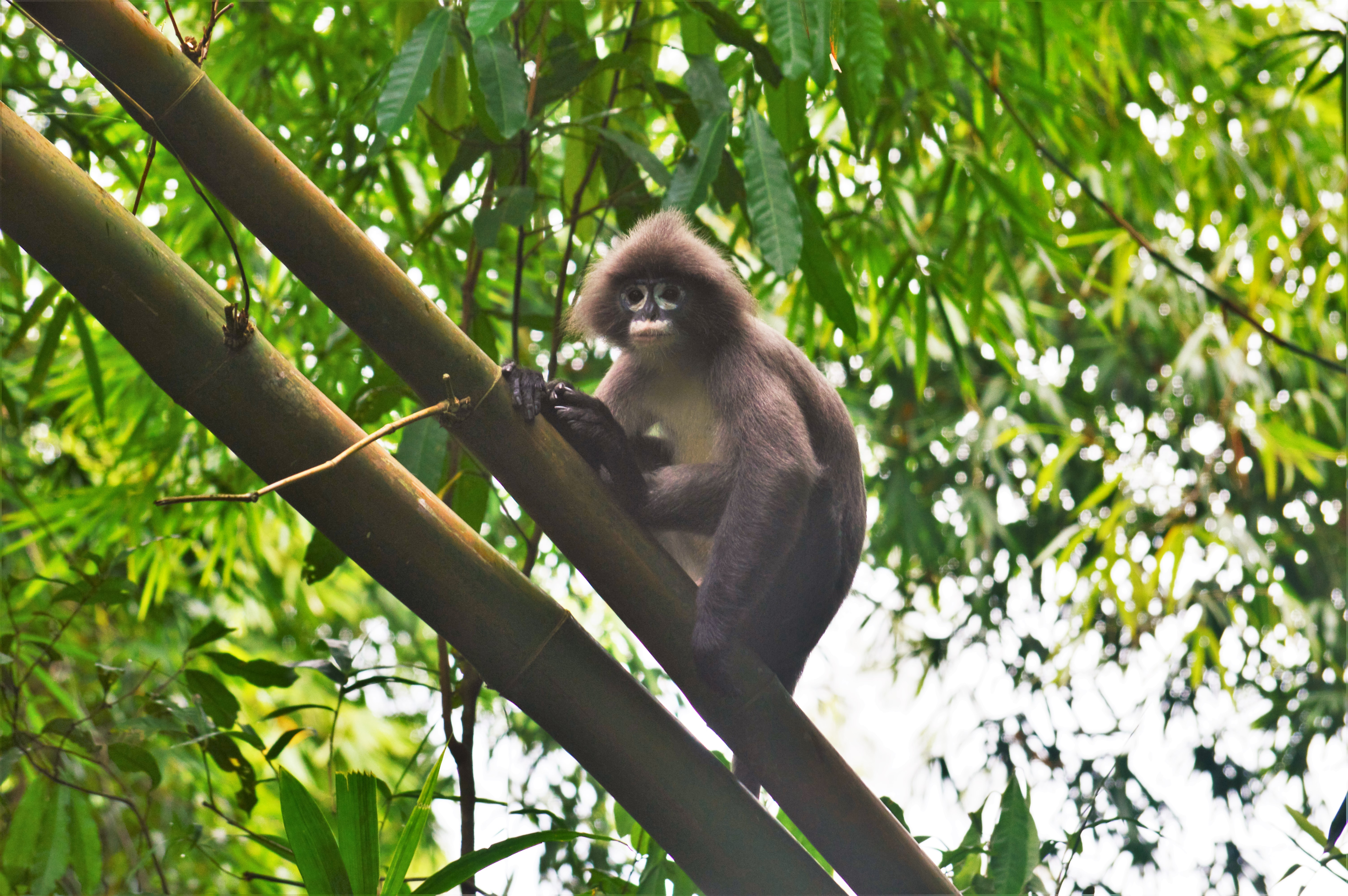
- In Lawachara National Park

Conservation status
- Endangered (IUCN 3.1)

Scientific classification
- Kingdom: Animalia
- Phylum: Chordata
- Class: Mammalia
- Order: Primates
- Family: Cercopithecidae
- Genus: Trachypithecus
- Species: T. phayrei

Binomial name
- Trachypithecus phayrei (Blyth, 1847)
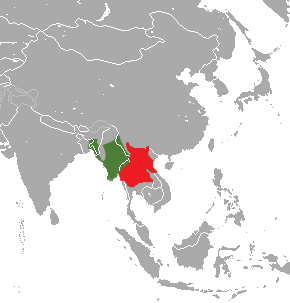
- Phayre's leaf monkey range in green (includes T. melamera)

= Phayre's leaf monkey =

Species of Old World monkey

Phayre's leaf monkey (Trachypithecus phayrei), also known as Phayre's langur, is a species of Old World monkey native to South Asia and Southeast Asia, namely India, Bangladesh, and Myanmar. Populations from further east are now thought to belong to other species. It is listed as Endangered on the IUCN Red List and is threatened by hunting and loss of habitat. The species epithet commemorates Arthur Purves Phayre.

== Taxonomy ==
The scientific name Presbytis phayrei was used by Edward Blyth in 1847 for two young individuals captured alive in the Arakan Mountains in Myanmar. Phayre's langur is one of the most widespread members of the genus, but its actual distribution and intraspecific taxonomy remain controversial. Previously, three subspecies were recognized, namely T. p. crepusculus, T. p. phayrei and T. p. shanicus.

Three separate species T. phayrei, T. melamera (formerly T. p. shanicus), and T. popa sp. nov. have been proposed based on mitochondrial genomes. Currently, the name Phayre's leaf monkey refers to T. phayrei, residing in forests of East Bengal, Northeast India and western Myanmar, specifically, areas to the west of the Chindwin and Irrawaddy Rivers.

== Characteristics ==
Phayre's langur is characterized by white coloration around the ventral, mouth, and eye area. The broad ring-shaped patches around the eyes resemble spectacles, contributing to the local name of "Chasma bandor" in Bengali, or spectacled monkey. The white fur is especially contrasting with the overall deep bluish-brown fur all over its body with darker shades at the head, below the elbows, and at the end of the tail. There is a presence of a sagittal crest on the heads of both adult males and females, giving it a triangular shape. The infants have a straw-colored natal coat, making it easily distinguishable in a group. The average head-body length ranges from 530–580 mm (21–23 in) in males and 495–580 mm (19.5–22.8 in) in females. The tail is usually longer than its body, with an average of 700 mm (28 in) for males and 750 mm (30 in), for females. In comparison to T. melamera and T. popa, it has a shorter tail length. The average mass of Phayre's langur is observed to be around 7.9 kg (17 lb) for males and 6.9 kg (15 lb) for females.

In field studies males and females are differentiated through the shape of the patches around the eyes. Female have cone-shaped white patches bending in towards the nose while males have a rounder shape. This shape difference causes a slightly wider gap in males than in females.

Like most Old World monkeys, it has the dental formula of 2.1.2.32.1.2.3 Distinctive to other colobines Phayre's langur show craniodental adaptations such as medially positioned rows of teeth and stronger masseter pterygoid muscles for seed-eating.

== Distribution and habitat ==
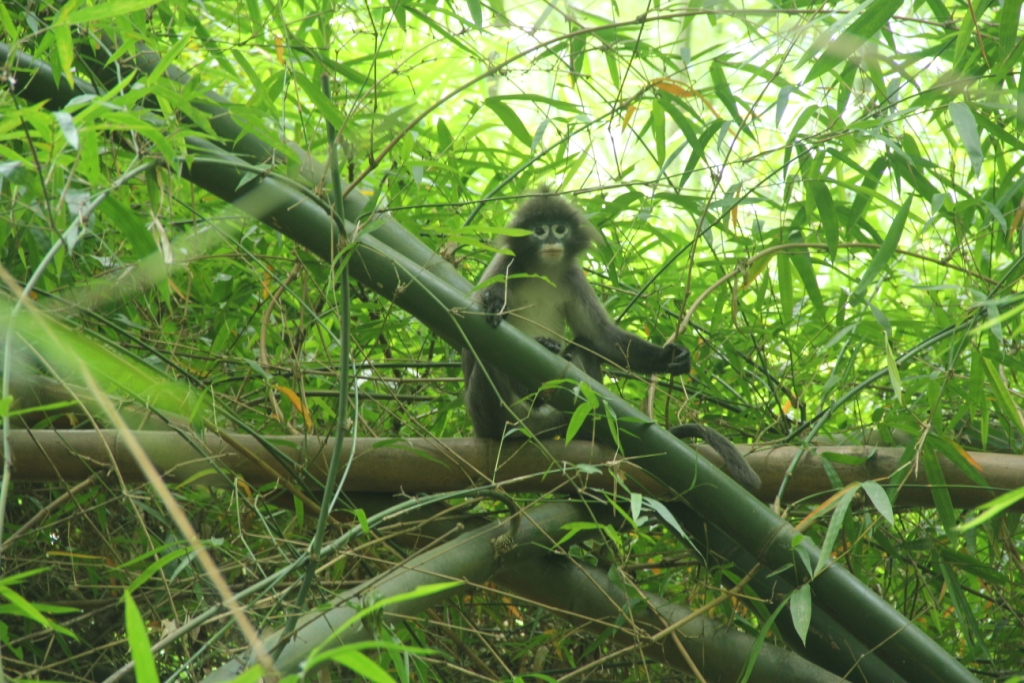
The Phayre's leaf Monkey resting in bamboo plants in Lawachara National Park

Pharye's langur is found in tropical, deciduous, and evergreen forests of North-East India, Eastern Bangladesh, and Western Myanmar. It can also be seen residing in secondary forests such as bamboo clusters and rubber plantations. Tree species with large canopies like Artocarpus chama, Artocarpus lacucha, Ficus racemosa, Trophis aspera, Mangifera indica, and Grewia nervosa, in Bangladesh, are used for resting in their shade. In India, the most common roosting trees range from heights of 6–15 m (20–49 ft) and have an extensive canopy, e.g., Ficus hispida and Triadica sebifera in Mizoram. Currently, a total of 1200 individual langurs have been recorded in India and 376 individuals in Bangladesh, 288 of which resided in the northeastern forests of Bangladesh.

== Behavior and ecology ==
=== Group structure ===
The Phayre's langur usually forms multi-male and multi-female with a presence of a dominant male alpha in the group. All-male groups, one-male groups, and one-female groups have also been observed, though less common. A high level of territoriality is seen within the species and between groups. The groups tend to maintain occupancy in their home range, showing philopatry. Foraging is done by maintaining groups throughout different ranges. While foraging, groups tend to avoid ranging areas of neighboring groups suggesting the formation of borders between them, agonistic interactions are observed in places of overlapping borders.

Female dispersal is also observed between the groups, females that leave the group tend to obtain alpha rank in the new group. Linear dominance is seen in females, where rank has a linear relationship with age. Males on reaching maturation show some dispersal, they either form new multi-male groups or return to their natal group. For males, age and rank dominance also show a linear relationship though, the ranks can change depending on the resource-holding potential, which is shown to decrease in aging monkeys.

=== Reproduction ===
Female Phayre's langurs are pregnant by an average age of 5.3 years with an average gestation period of 205 days. The females show promiscuous behavior, studies do show a preference for more experienced males, usually of higher dominance. Polygynous relationships are common, where males offer protection to copulated females.

Females usually nurse their infants on average 22 months with weaning at around 19–21 months. The natal coat starts to become darker 26 weeks after birth.

=== Communication ===
Vocalization is observed in both males and females. Based on observations in the wild, a loud "kah-kah-kah" is used to sound alarm in the troop, while in the presence of a predator a softer "whoo" call is used. The dominant male alpha uses the "cheng-kong" sound to assemble the group. Additionally, vocalization essential is for maintaining contact with troop members while foraging. In agonistic interactions, barking sounds such as "ngre-go, ngre-go" are used to maintain their group's territory.

=== Activity budget ===
The Phayre's Leaf Monkey is diurnal and arboreal. The average life span of it being 20–30 years, in the wild, and an average of 28.3 in captivity. A study conducted in the Satchari National Park, Bangladesh, found on average the Phayre's leaf Monkey spends, most of its time foraging and feeding (40.7%), the rest is spent traveling (31.8%), resting (18.3%), grooming (7.8%) and playing (1.4%). It is seen that males and juveniles tend to spend more time moving than adult females, who also have the highest percentage of resting among them. It is noticed that the activity patterns have variations based on habitats, seasons, and food availability, for example, food shortages lead to increased travel time. The variation in caloric content of different foods have shown to affect the energy budgets, i.e., poor quality food leads to higher feeding distribution to maintain the caloric requirements.

=== Diet ===
The Phayre's leaf monkey is a folivore. It feeds on leaves, shoots, seeds, flowers, gum, and fleshy parts of fruits. The diet varies between seasons and different regions, showing adaptation to the local flora.

In Dampa Tiger Reserve, the Phayre's langurs feeds on Citrus grandis, Gmelina arborea, Ficus maclellendii, Buetneria pilosa, with a preference towards bamboos such as Musa ornata, Melocanna baccifera and Dendrocalamus longispathus during summer. Plant parts with less fiber and high proteins and sugars such as young leaves are usually preferred while foraging. In Satchari National Park in Bangladesh, they feed primarily on Ficus hispida, Albizia chinensis, and Vachellia nilotica.

The high bamboo consumption in their diets is attributed to the abundance of this plant in North-East India because of its invasive nature. Phayre's langurs living in local rubber plantations in Mizoram majorly consume leaves of Hevea brasiliensis showing that diet is affected by the plant diversity in its home range.

In Tripura, India, it mainly feeds on leaves of Albizia procera, Albizzia lebbek and A. stipulata, Melocanna bambusoides, Macaranga denticulata, Callicarpa arborea, Dillenia pentagyna, Litsea sp., Mikania scandens, Gmelina arborea, Artocarpus chaplasha, Syzygium fruticosum, Ficus racemosa, Ficus hispida, Ficus indica and F. fistulosa.

== Conservation ==
The IUCN Red List has deemed the population of Phayre's langur to be decreasing. The recent reclassification of Phayre's langur has led to the underestimation of the status of the decline in the species' population. It is also listed in the CITES Appendix II, to protect its illegal poaching and trading locally. The major threats to Phayre's langur are habitat destruction, fragmentation, logging, roadkill, ecotourism, electrocution and hunting.

In India, organizations like the Wildlife Trust of India have employed wildlife staff trained in anti-poaching tactics to work in forests, and locals have also been involved. In both India and Bangladesh, Pharye's langur is protected through national and local legislation and through implementation of international conservation laws and policies, i.e., the Wild Life (Protection) Act, 1972, in India and Wildlife (Conservation and Security) Act, 2012, in Bangladesh .

The 'jhooming', a form of shifting cultivation practiced by tribes in India, led to concerns over reducing forestland for the Phayre's langur population, but a study showed that they adapted to the local practice. The regenerating secondary forests through 'jhooming' provide a habitat for the langurs when primary forests are unsuitable to stay in due to anthropogenic factors.
