= Lawachara National Park =

National park and nature reserve in Bangladesh

- IUCN category II (national park)
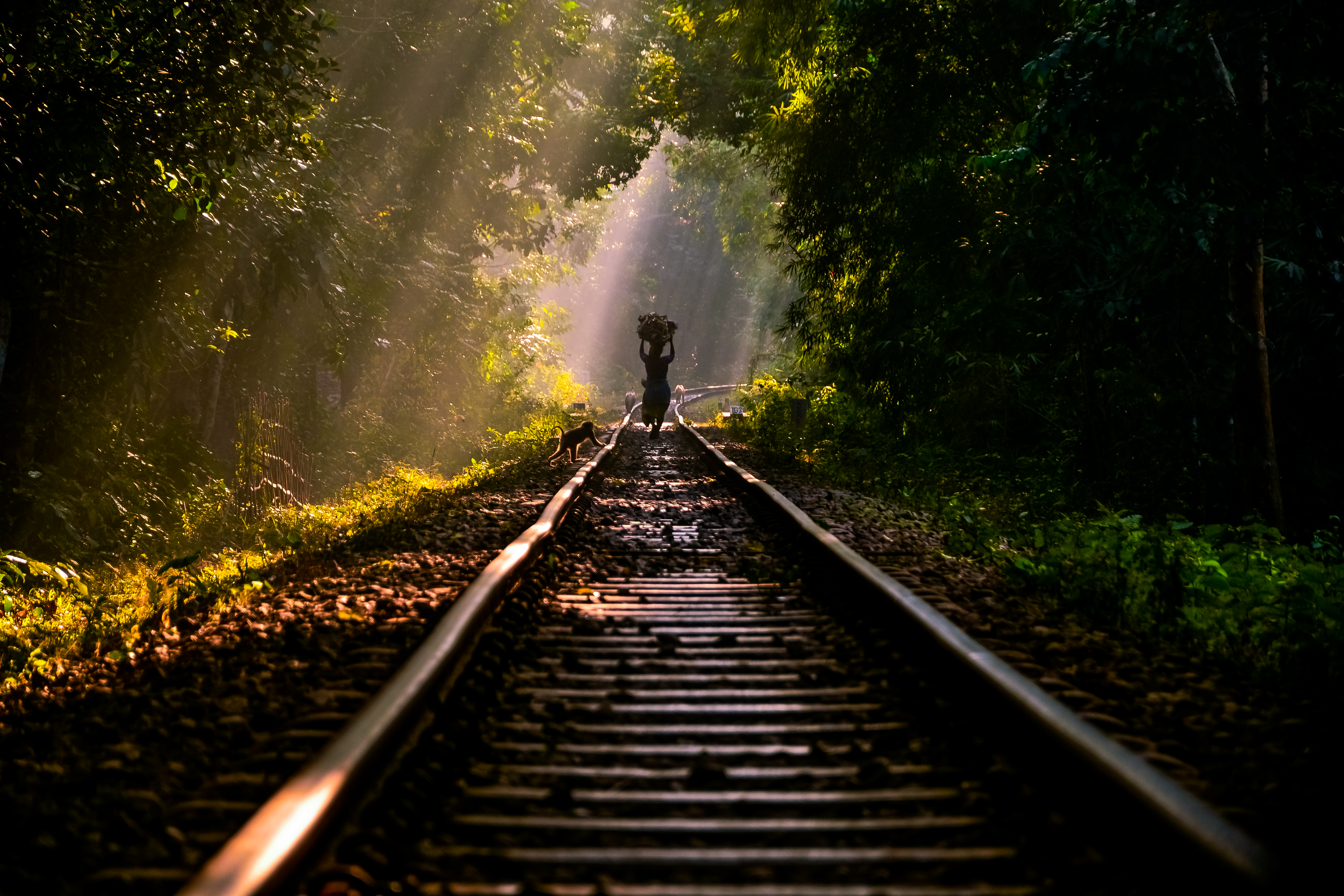

- Location within Bangladesh
- Location: Moulvibazar District, Sylhet Division, Bangladesh
- Nearest city: Sreemangal
- Coordinates: 24°19′11″N 91°47′1″E
- Area: 1,250 ha (3,100 acres)
- Established: 1996

Lawachara National Park (Bengali: লাউয়াছড়া জাতীয় উদ্যান) is a national park and nature reserve in Bangladesh, located in Kamalganj Upazila and Moulvibazar District in the northeastern region of the country. It is located within the 2,740 ha (27.4 km^{2}) West Bhanugach Reserved Forest.

Lawachara National Park covers approximately 1,250 ha (12.5 km^{2}) of semi-evergreen forest biome and mixed deciduous forest biome. The land was declared a national park by the Bangladesh government on 7 July 1996 under the Wildlife Act of 1974.

== Location ==
Lawachara is about 160 km (99 mi) northeast of Dhaka and 60 km (37 mi) from Sylhet. It is 8 kilometres (5.0 mi) from the town of Sreemangal Upazila.

The terrain of Lawachara is undulating with scattered 10 to 50 m (33 to 164 ft) hillocks. Locally known as tila, the hillocks are primarily composed of Upper Tertiary soft sandstone. The park is crossed by numerous sandy-bedded streams (locally known as Nallah), one of which is the Lawachara tributary, from which the park derived its name. The soil of Lawachara is alluvial brown sandy clay loam to clay loam dating from the Pliocene epoch. Shallow depressions filled with water (haor wetlands) are also a feature of the region, as the low-lying areas are often subject to flooding.

The climate of Lawachara is generally pleasant to warm, averaging 26.8 °C (80.2 °F) in February to 36.1 °C (97.0 °F) in June. The humidity is high throughout the year, and Lawachara experiences frequent rains with occasional cyclonic storms.

== Biodiversity ==
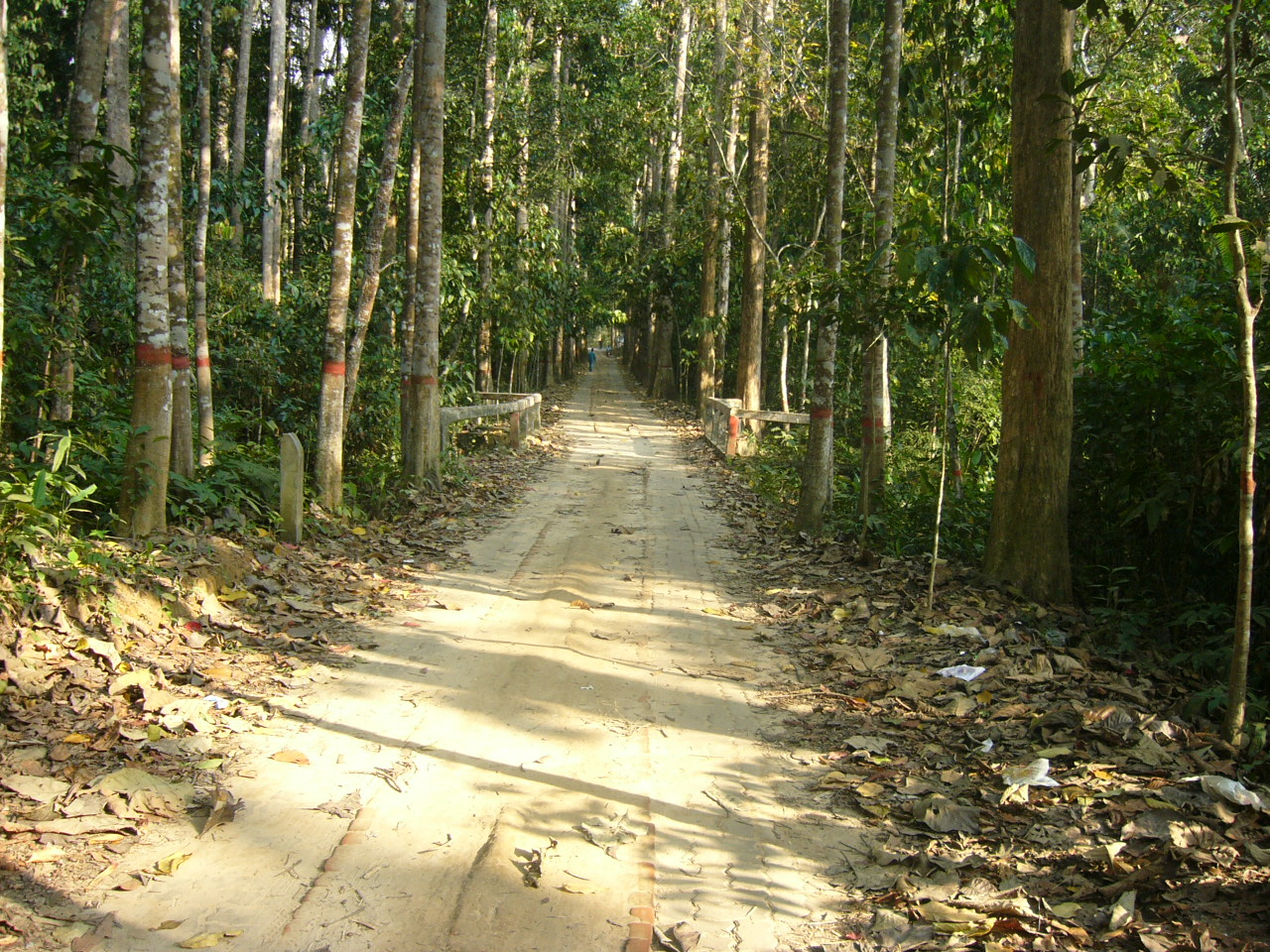
Forest in Lawachara National Park

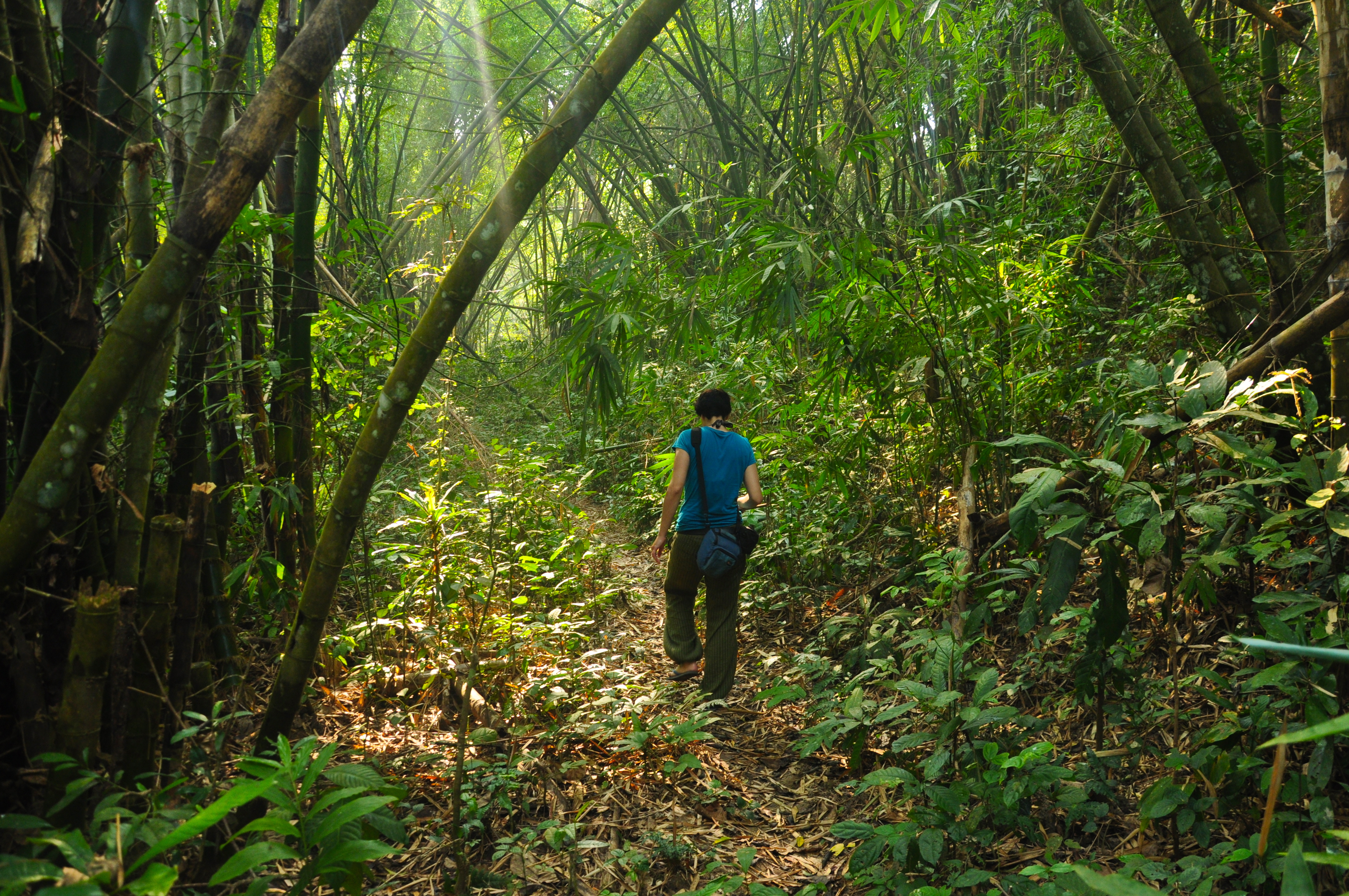
Bamboo grove in Lawachara National Park

Lawachara National Park harbours 460 species, of which 167 species are plants, four amphibian species, six reptile species, 246 bird species, 20 mammal species, and 17 insect species.

=== Plants and animals ===
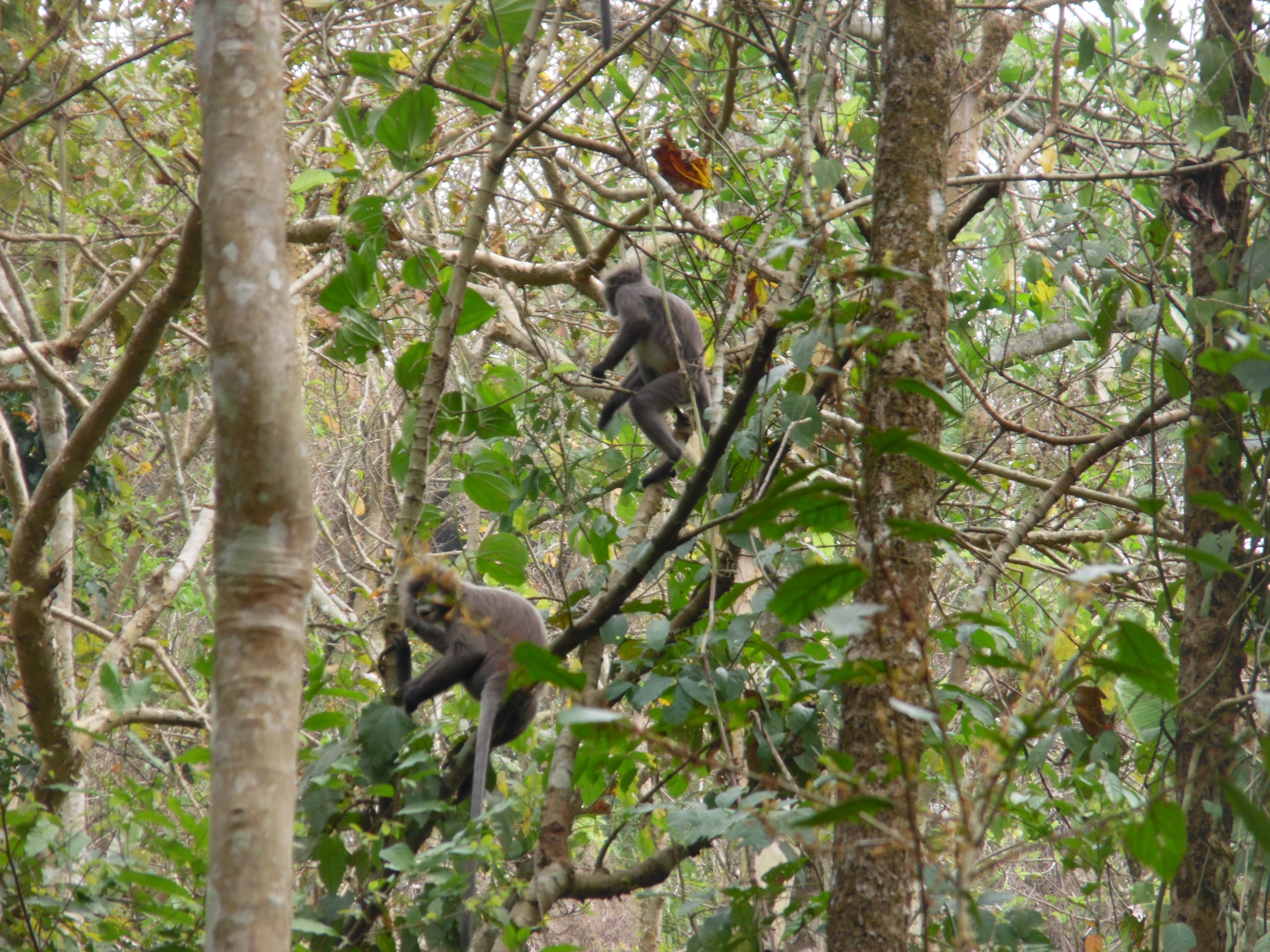
Animals at Lawachara National Park

The forest of Lawachara National Park is of a mixed type, including evergreen forest with Quercus, Syzygium, Gmelina, Dillenia, Grewia, and Ficus species. The upper canopy, meanwhile, is mainly composed of tall deciduous trees, including Tectona, Artocarpus chama, Tetrameles, Hopea odorata. Toona ciliata, and Pygenum. The original indigenous mixed tropical evergreen vegetation had been removed or replaced in the 1920s. It is now mostly secondary forest with small remnant areas of rich primary forest. In the undergrowth are bamboo groves of jai bansh (Bambusa burmanica) and muli bansh (Melocanna baccifera), as well as several fern species and other epiphytes.

159 plant species belonging to 123 genera and 60 families were studied in 2010. It includes 78 species of trees, 14 species of shrubs, 42 species of herbs, and 25 species of climbers. Ficus (fig trees) and Syzygium (brush cherries), each with 7 species, were the most diverse genera. Other notable genera include Terminalia, Dioscorea (yams), Artocarpus, Calamus (rattan palm), Piper (pepper vines), Alpinia, and Curcuma. Threatened indigenous plant species include Bridelia retusa, Zanthoxylum rhetsa, Alstonia scholaris, Phyllanthus emblica, Cassia fistula, Oroxylum indicum, Semecarpus anacardium, and Garuga pinnata.

The western hoolock gibbon (Hoolock hoolock) is a higher primate found in India. It is one of the top 25 most endangered primates and one of the six non-human primate species found in Lawachara. In a 2007 census, only 62 individuals in 17 groups were found in Lawachara and in the greater West Bhanugach Reserved Forest. Yet this is the biggest surviving gibbon population in Bangladesh. The Lawachara population is considered of critical importance as it is likely to be the last viable population of western hoolock gibbons that will survive into the next century.

Other notable wildlife includes Phayre's leaf monkey, Bengal slow loris, capped langur, barking deer, wild boar, leopard cat, Chinese pangolin, Burmese python, and other various species.

== Settlements ==
There are about eighteen villages near Lawachara National Park. Two of them, Punji and Lawachara Punji, are located within the boundaries of the park. Indigenous peoples in the area include the Khasi people, the Tripuri people, and the Monipuri people. The rest of the population are mostly Muslim migrants from Noakhali District, Comilla District, and Assam. There is a mosque located off Srimangal-Bhanugach Road called Lawachara Jame Mosque.

Registered forest villagers have certain rights within the reserve. This includes wood collection for fuel and building materials, hunting, betel leaf production, grazing of livestock, harvesting of other forest products, and limited agriculture in allocated land.

== Chevron controversy ==
Seismic explorations

In 2008, the Bangladesh government permitted the US-based international Chevron Corporation to conduct a 3D seismic exploration in the Lawachara National Park. Chevron claims to give "utmost priority in protecting the biodiversity of the area". Field crews are instructed to avoid drilling shot holes near threatened plant species or areas of wildlife activity.

Environmental impacts

Explosions conducted in Lawachara as a part of Chevron's survey are claimed to frighten wildlife, making them leave the forest at an alarming rate. On 7 May 2008, a hoolock gibbon, in an attempt to flee, allegedly died after jumping onto an electric cable. Damage to residential buildings from the tremors induced by the explosions were also reported, as well as a fire caused by activities of the survey crew. Chevron failed to acknowledge both incidents.

Chevron's seismic exploration follows in the wake of the Magurchara gas field explosion on 14 June 1997, which destroyed 2.8 km^{2} (700 acres) of the West Bhanugach Reserved Forest. Gas exploration in the area was then led by the Union Oil Company of California (Unocal), now a subsidiary of Chevron.

Responses

The survey has also been strongly criticised for violating the municipal laws of Bangladesh on wildlife conservation. It has been noted that the environmental impact monitoring team of the survey (including representatives from IUCN Bangladesh, the Bangladesh Environmental Lawyers Association, and the Nishorgo project), formed in response to public concern, were all funded by Chevron. Lawachara is also mostly maintained by the Nishorgo project, funded by the United States Agency for International Development (USAID). The Nishorgo project has been accused of being more concerned with international corporate economic interests by letting Chevron into the very areas they were supposed to protect.

In essence, Nishorgo project now appears to have created an institutionalised space conducive to the preservation of economic and security interest of the USA in general; and to be specific, to the interest of Chevron when necessary. Therefore, this is no surprise that Chevron had been able to conduct the seismic survey in Lawachhara National Park where an environmental project is in partnership with the 'mighty' USAID. In other words, Nishorgo project provides the necessary structures both for Chevron and the USAID for co-opting actors for necessary legitimacy and thus generating consents accordingly in terms of its programmes and declared norms/values.

— Mohammad Tanzimuddin Khan, Chevron's Seismic Survey, USAID's Nishorgo Project, the Lawachara National Park of Bangladesh: A Critical Review (2008)

== See also ==
- Madhupur tract
