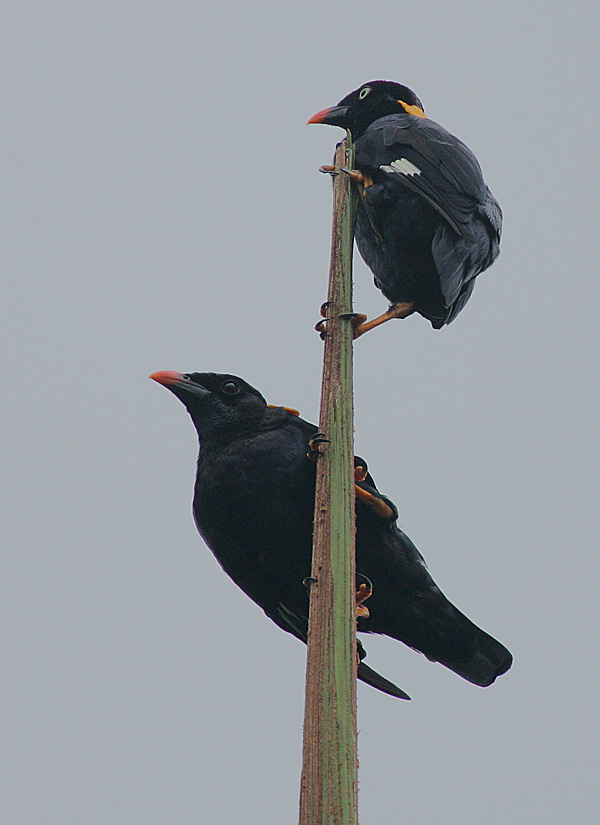
- Female above, male below

Conservation status
- Near Threatened (IUCN 3.1)

Scientific classification
- Kingdom: Animalia
- Phylum: Chordata
- Class: Aves
- Order: Passeriformes
- Family: Sturnidae
- Genus: Gracula
- Species: G. ptilogenys

Binomial name
- Gracula ptilogenys Blyth, 1846

= Sri Lanka hill myna =

Species of bird

The Sri Lanka hill myna or Ceylon myna (Gracula ptilogenys) is a myna, a member of the starling family. This bird is endemic to Sri Lanka.

This passerine is typically found in forest and cultivation. The Sri Lanka myna builds a nest in a hole. The normal clutch is two eggs.

These 25 cm long birds have green-glossed black plumage, purple-tinged on the head and neck. There are large white wing patches, which are obvious in flight. The strong legs are bright yellow, and there are yellow wattles on the nape.

The different shape and position of the wattles and the stouter orange-red bill distinguish this species from the southern hill myna, which also occurs in Sri Lankan forests. The sexes are similar in plumage, but can be distinguished by iris color, which is pale in females and dark in males. Juveniles have a duller bill and smaller wattles, and are less glossy overall.

Like most starlings, the Sri Lanka myna is fairly omnivorous, eating fruit, nectar and insects.

== In culture ==
In Sri Lanka, the Myna bird is known in many names including Sela lihiniya, Mal kawadiya, Kampatiya in the Sinhala language. The name Sela Lihiniya is often mentioned in poems and other similar literature and is quoted for its melodious calls. This bird appears in a 10 rupee Sri Lankan postal stamp. It is also the media icon of Sri Lanka Rupavahini Corporation.
