= Sitesh Ranjan Deb =

Bangladeshi hunter and conservationist (1950/1951–2026)

- সিতেশ রঞ্জন দেব
- Born: 1950 or 1951
- Died: 14 July 2026 (aged 75); Sreemangal, Moulvibazar, Bangladesh
- Occupation: Wildlife conservationist
- Children: Swapan Deb Sonjol

Sitesh Ranjan Deb (1950 or 1951 – 14 July 2026), known as Sitesh Babu, was a Bangladeshi professional hunter who was a notable wildlife conservationist.

== Background ==
Deb grew up in a family that had been hunters, and in his youth, when hunting was not legally restricted, he himself was a professional hunter and wilderness guide. However, his life changed in an accident in 1991 when he unexpectedly came face to face with a bear. He was injured severely, losing part of his face and right eye, before he managed to shoot the bear. He quit hunting and focused on wildlife conservation.

== Zoo ==
Locally, wild animals and their habitat have rapidly diminished as an enlarging human population has led to deforestation, often illegally, for timber and firewood. Even before he stopped hunting altogether he had developed a zoo which has rescued, rehabilitated and freed more than 3,000 animals. The zoo has hosted many rare animal species such as the first recorded Burmese ferret-badger in Bangladesh. His work has been featured in numerous news articles.

== Death ==
Deb died on 14 July 2026 in Sreemangal. His body was taken to the Bangladesh Wildlife Service Foundation so that people and rescued animals could honor him prior to his funeral.
