= Magurchara Punji =

Coordinates: 24.3345°N 91.8023°E

Magurchhara Punji Magursora Punji
- Village
- Interactive map of Magurchhara Punji
- Country: Bangladesh
- Division: Sylhet
- District: Moulvibazar
- Upazila: Kamalganj
- Union Parishad: Kamalganj Sadar
- Ward: 3

Population
  - Total: 155

Magurchhara Punji (Bengali: মাগুরছড়া পুঞ্জি, romanized: Magurchhora Punji, lit. 'Village of the walking catfish stream', Khasi: Magursora Puñji) is a tribal village inhabited by the Khasi ethnic minority. It is located off the Srimangal–Kamalganj Highway in the 3rd Ward of Kamalganj Union, Kamalganj Upazila, Moulvibazar District, Bangladesh. As of 2006, Magurchara Punji had nearly 40 households. It is the larger of the two tribal villages located within Lawachara National Park, the other being Lawachara Punji. It has a population of 155 people.

== History ==
The etymology of the village is of multiple words. Punji is a word in the Khasi language to refer to a cluster of homesteads for one tribe. Magur is the Bengali name for a species of fish called walking catfish. The Bengali suffix Chhara means small stream, and therefore literally, Magurchhara means the small stream of walking catfish.

The 14th of June is remembered as Magurchhara Day. The Magurchhara Tragedy took place at midnight on this day in 1997. During a well excavation, an explosion took place leading to a loss of roughly 14,000 koti Bangladeshi takas (UK £1.4 billion). The explosion was heard around the Kamalganj Upazila. The Akhaura–Kulaura–Chhatak line, Fulbari Tea Estate, Srimangal-Kamalganj highway, local homesteads, and conservation forests and the local biodiversity such as the Lawachara National Park were heavily affected as well as the Bangladesh Power Development Board's 33,000kV main 15 kilometres (9.3 mi) power line which burnt and exploded due to the high pressure. A further 28 tea gardens were also indirectly affected. Around 50 tea gardens in Kulaura, Barlekha and Kamalganj reported issues of no power for a long period. The Akhaura–Kulaura–Chhatak line and Srimangal-Kamalganj highway was closed for 6 months. 695 hectares of forest resources were severely damaged and 200 billion cubic feet of gas, with a market value of 5 billion US dollars, burnt. Within two years after the incident, 87.5 acres of Lawachara National Park was destroyed due to the gas fire, with 20.5 acres being completely destroyed. The day has been commemorated by many organisations due to the government still not responding to the situation. The incident had both national and international coverage.

== Flora and fauna ==
Magurchhara and has green hills. Gibbons and birds live in the forest of the Lawachara National Park. Tea plantations are located in the area surrounding the national park.

== See also ==
- List of villages in Bangladesh
