= Shan State langur =

Conservation status
- Endangered (IUCN 3.1)

Scientific classification
- Kingdom: Animalia
- Phylum: Chordata
- Class: Mammalia
- Order: Primates
- Suborder: Haplorhini
- Infraorder: Simiiformes
- Family: Cercopithecidae
- Genus: Trachypithecus
- Species: T. phayrei
- Subspecies: T. p. shanicus

Trinomial name
- Trachypithecus phayrei shanicus (Elliot, 1909)

Subspecies of mammal

The Shan State langur (Trachypithecus phayrei shanicus) is a subspecies of primate in the family Cercopithecidae. It is found in eastern Myanmar and southwest China. While it is typically considered a subspecies or even a synonym of Phayre's leaf monkey (T. phayrei), it is sometimes listed as a full species.
