= Seven-color tea =

Bangladeshi beverage

Seven Colour Tea Seven Layer Tea
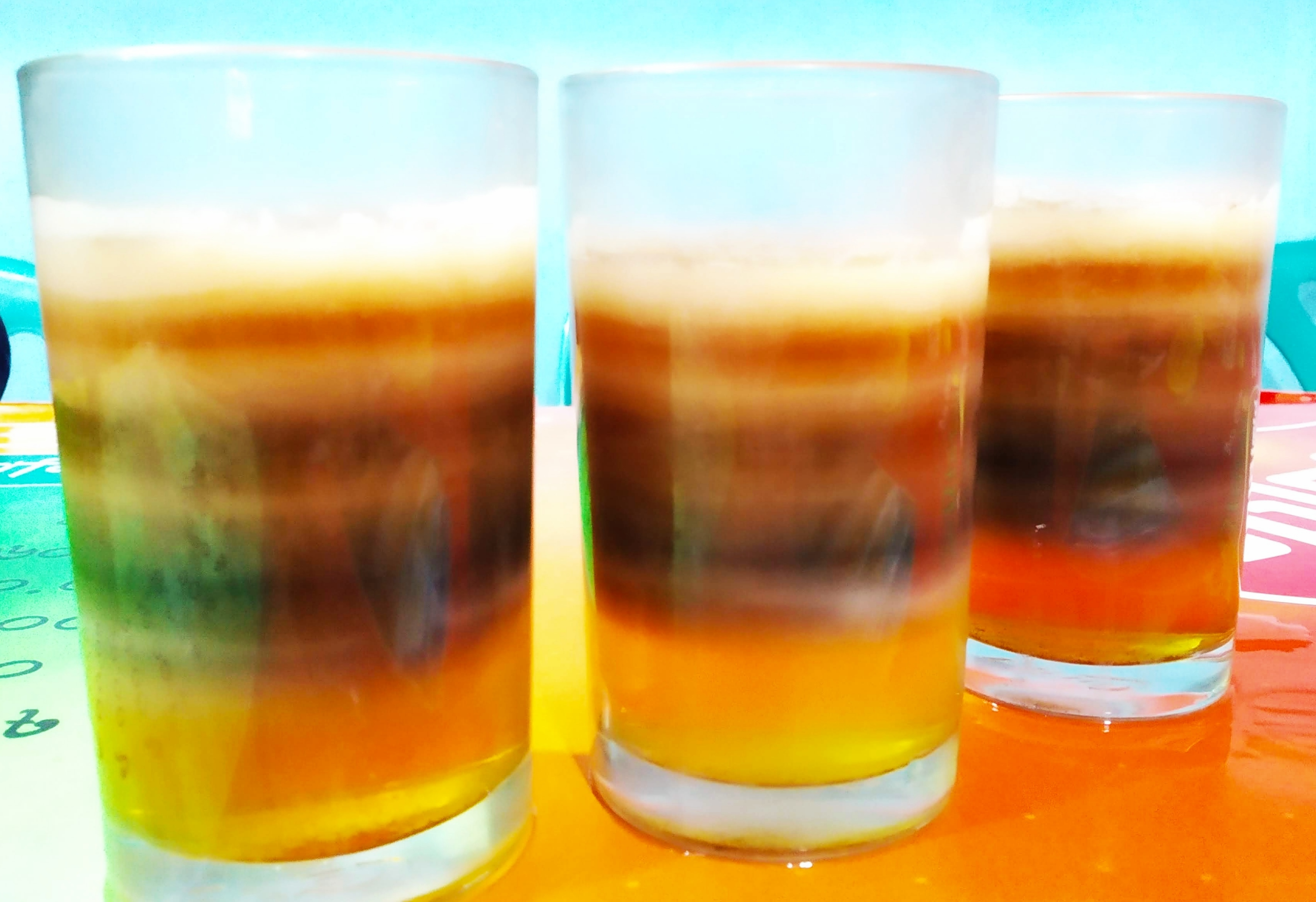
- Seven layer tea
- Course: Beverage
- Place of origin: Bangladesh
- Region or state: Sylhet
- Created by: Ramesh Ram Gaur
- Main ingredients: Tea, condensed milk, cinnamon, cloves and lemons
- Variations: multiple (2+) layer/colour tea

Seven-colour tea or seven-layer tea is a Bangladeshi beverage comprising layers of different teas. Tea is made in multiple permutations of concentration, tea leaf variety and adjuncts such as milk, sugar and flavourings and when combined separates according to density. Each layer contrasts in colour and taste, ranging from syrupy sweet to spicy clove. The result is an alternating dark/light band pattern throughout the drink, giving the tea its name.

Romesh Ram Gour, the operator of a tea shop in Srimongol, Moulvibazar, claims to have devised the drink. It has been widely imitated throughout Bangladesh, with varying numbers of layers.

== Gallery ==
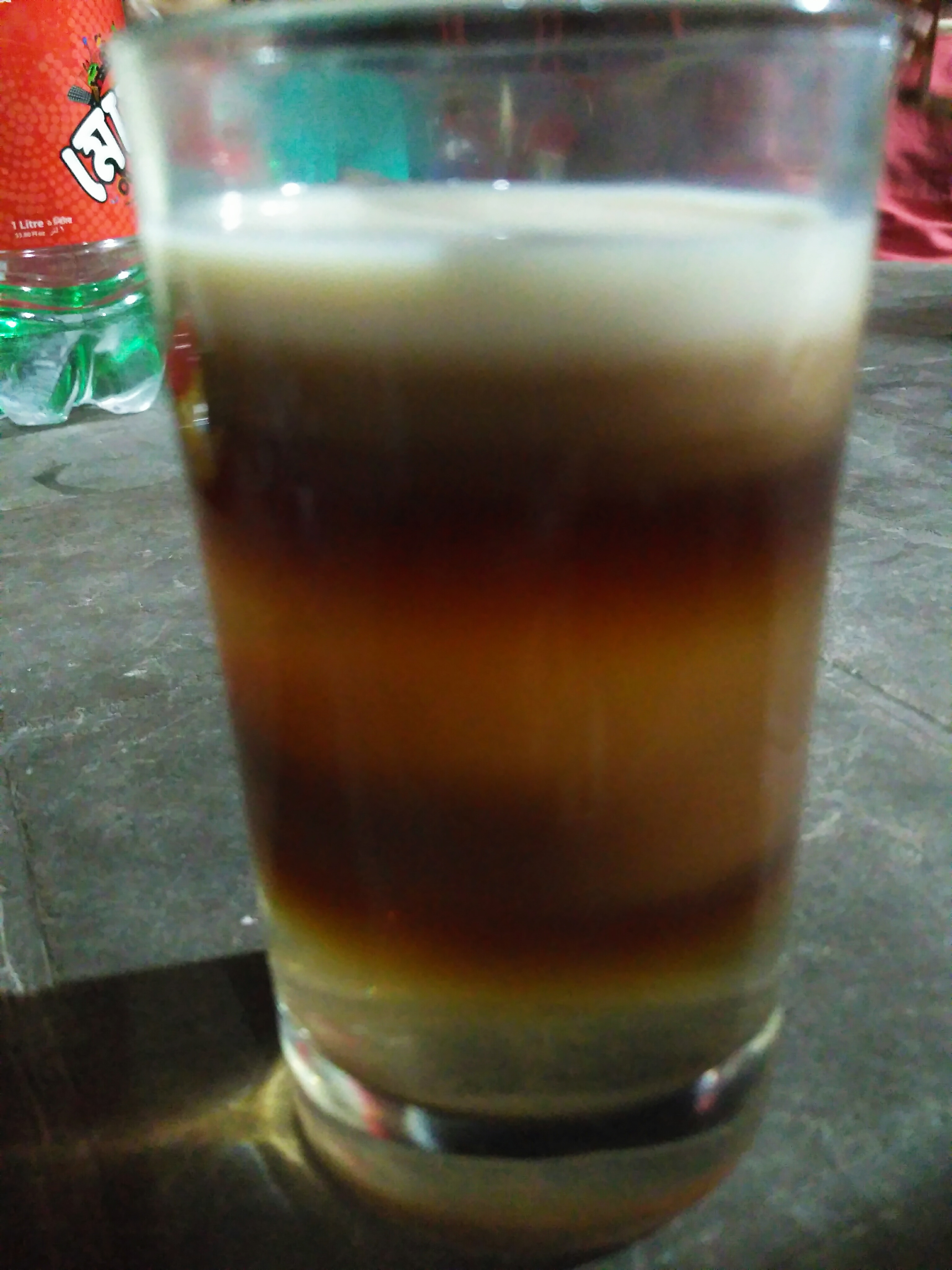
Seven colour tea, Sylhet

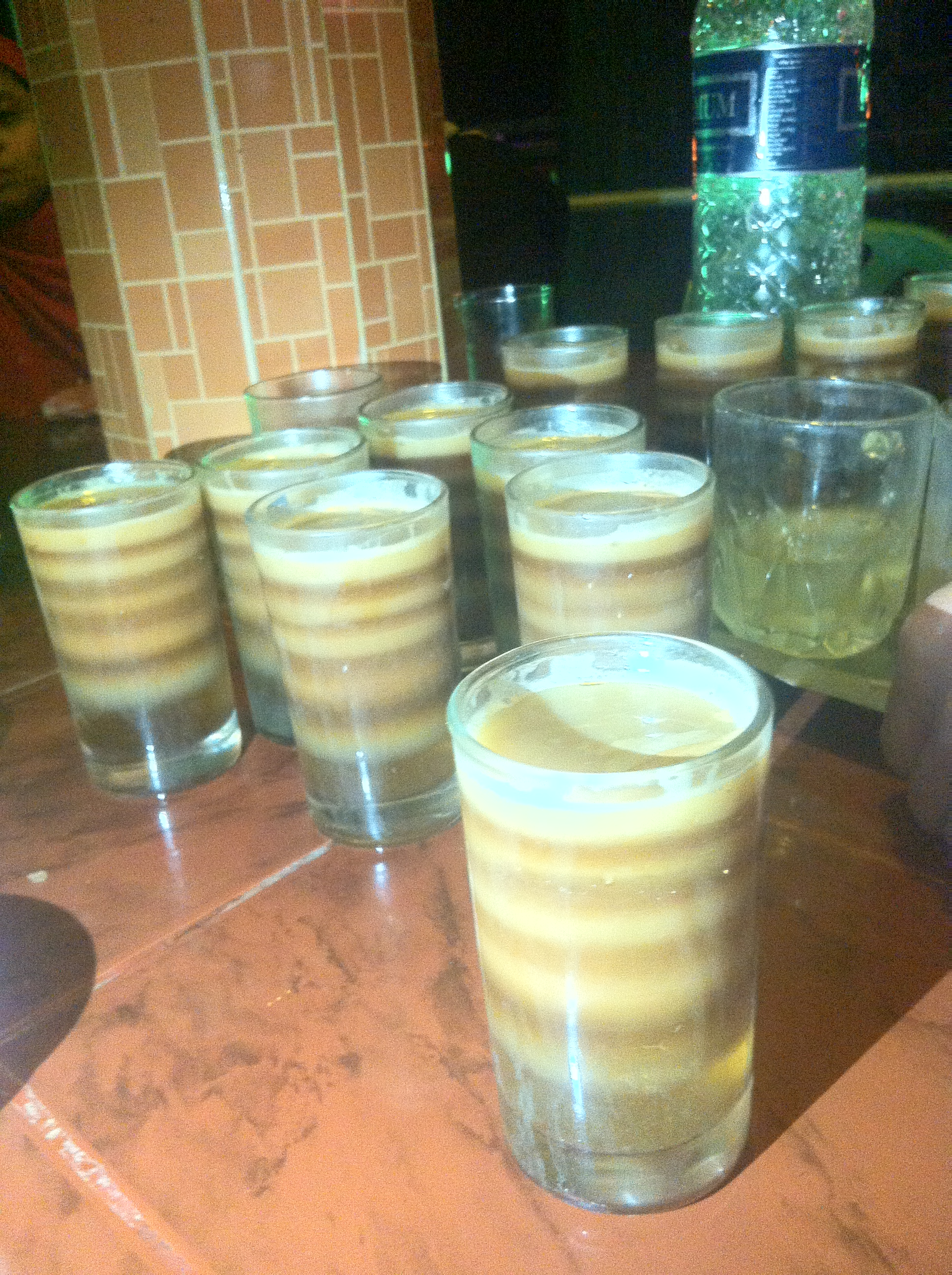
Ten layer tea, Sreemangal, Sylhet

== See also ==
- Tea production in Bangladesh
- Economy of Sylhet
