= Satchari National Park =

National park in Bangladesh

- IUCN category II (national park)
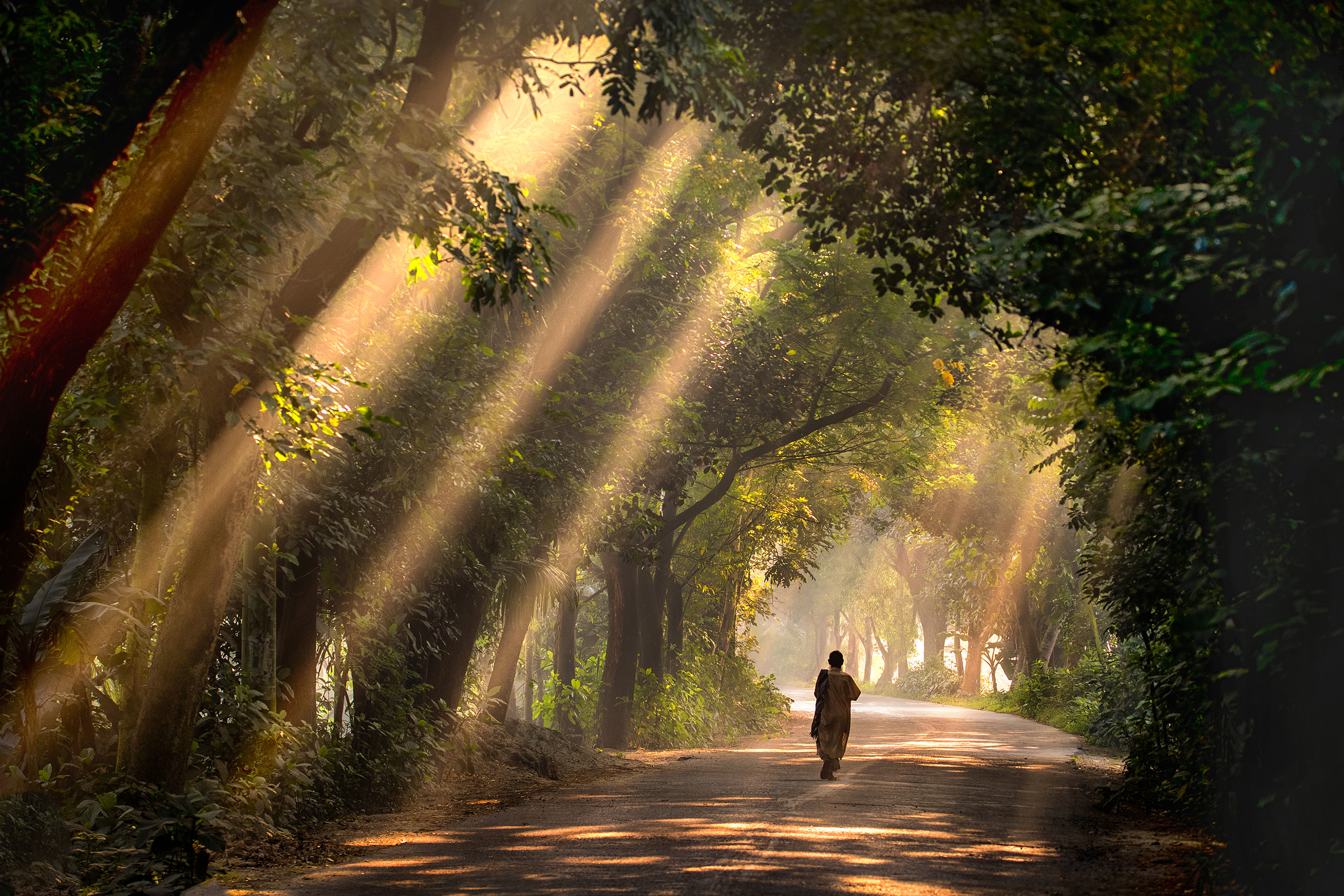

- Location within Bangladesh
- Location: Habiganj District, Bangladesh
- Coordinates: 24°07′12″N 91°27′03″E
- Area: 243 ha (600 acres)
- Established: 2005

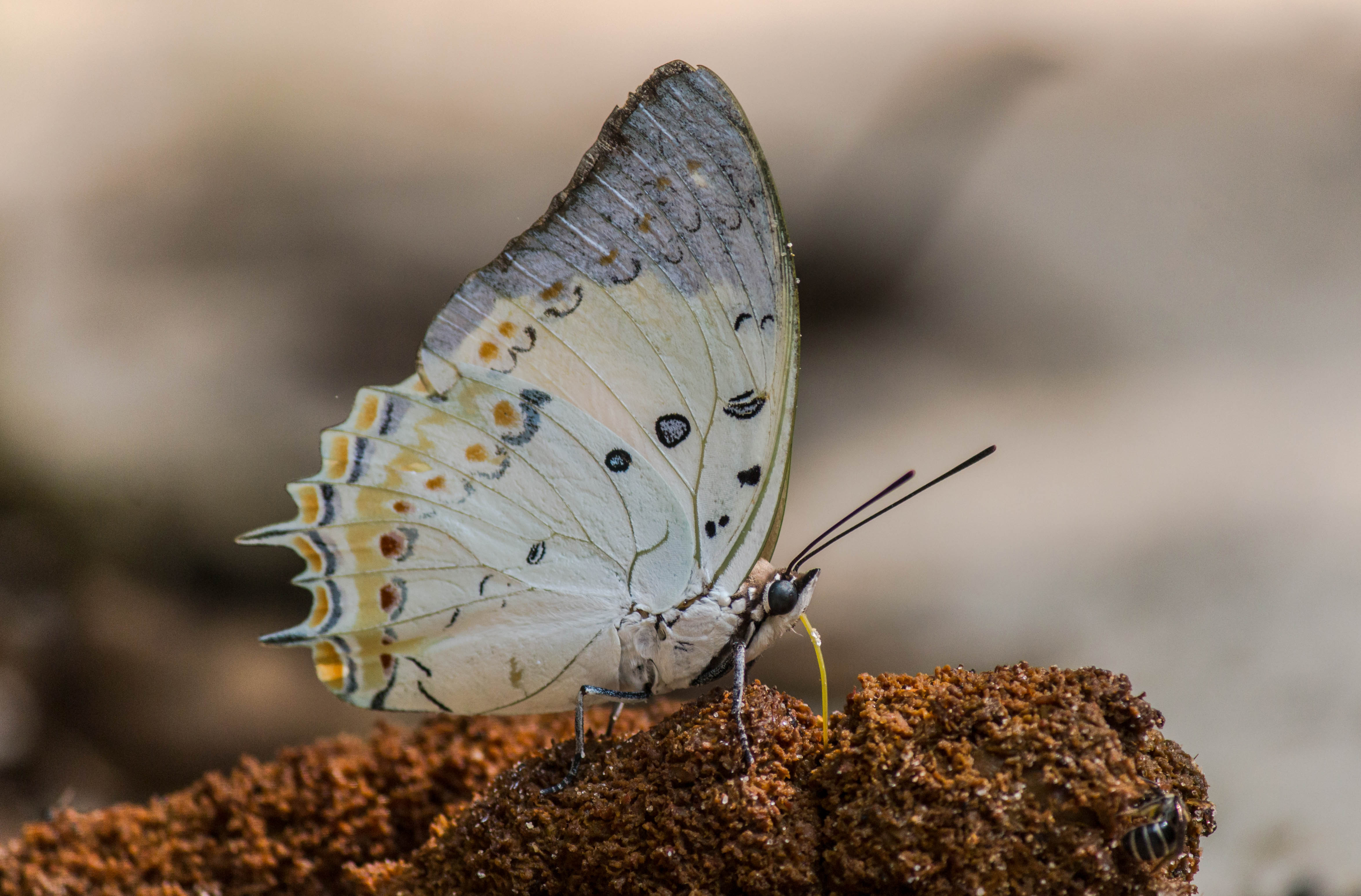
Jewelled nawab in the park

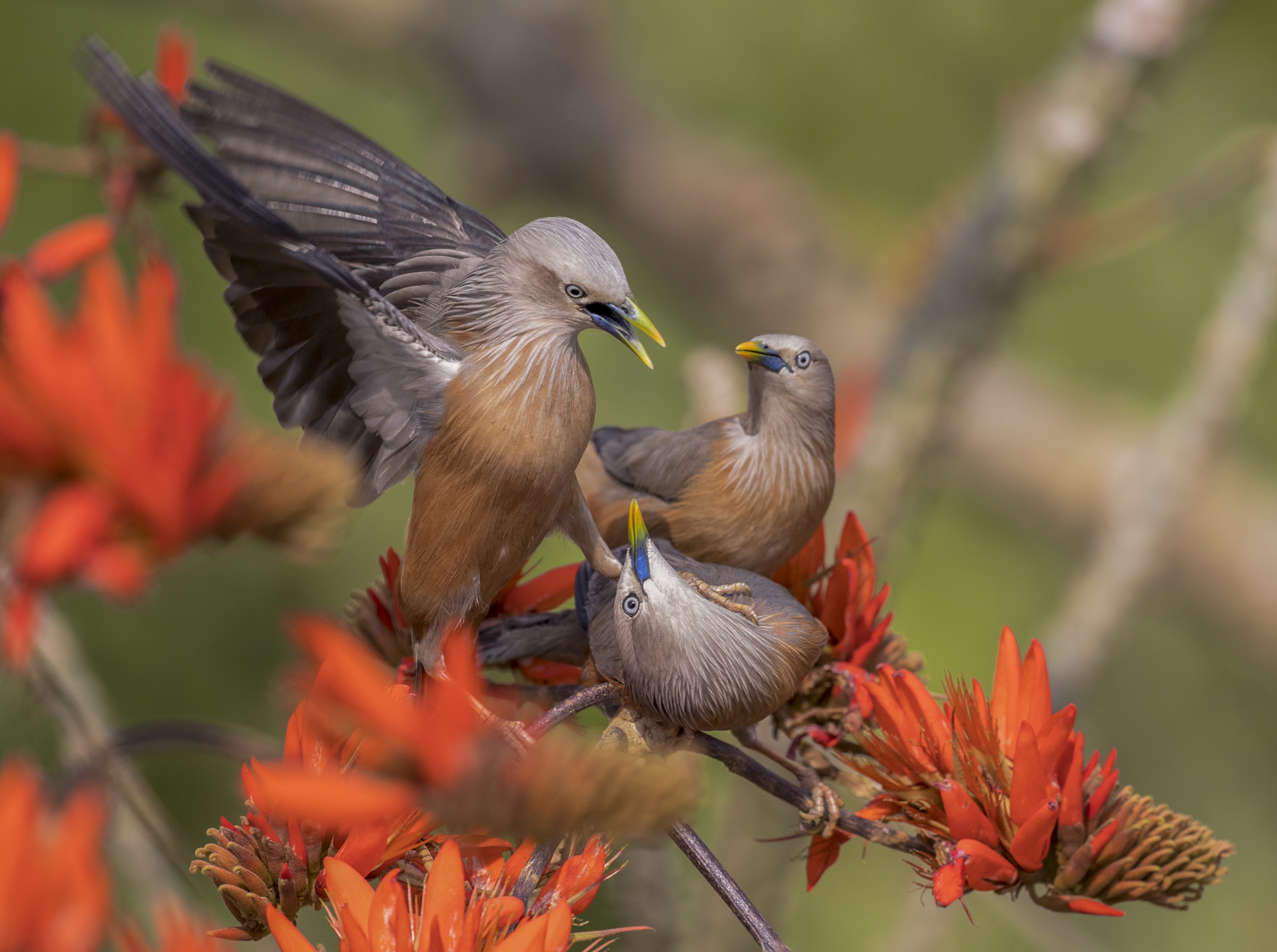
Chestnut-tailed starlings in the park

Satchari National Park (Bengali: সাতছড়ি জাতীয় উদ্যান) is a national park in Habiganj District, Bangladesh. After the 1974 Wild Life Preservation Act, in 2005 Satchari National Park was built on 243 hectares (600 acres) of land. Literally 'Satchari' in Bengali means 'Seven Streams'. There are seven streams flowing in this jungle, and the name 'Satchari' came from there.

== Details ==
The park is situated in Raghunandan hill, under Paikpara Union, Chunarughat Upazila, Habiganj District, under Sylhet region. It is 130 kilometres (81 mi) from the capital city of Bangladesh, Dhaka. There are 9 tea gardens nearby. Satchari tea garden is on the west, and Chaklapunji tea garden is on the east. Approximately 24 families of the Tipra Tribe live in Tipra village as of 2007.

== Plants ==
There are approximately 200 and more trees are in Satchari National Park. Shaal (Shorea robusta), Segun (Tectona grandis), Agar, Garjan, Chapalish, palm, Mehgani, Krishnachur, Dumur (Ficus), Jamrul, Shidha Jarul, Awal, Malekas, eucalyptus, Akashmoni, bamboo trees, and bet trees (regional name Mutra) are the most common species of trees found there.

== Wildlife ==
Wildlife in this park is rich. Red junglefowl, red-headed trogon, oriental pied hornbill, and the range-restricted cachar bulbul are some of them. The critically endangered western hoolock gibbon, as well as Phayre's leaf monkey, capped langur, Bengal slow loris, northern pig-tailed macaque, and rhesus macaque resides here. Asian black bears and Asian wild dogs also reside here in small numbers.

More common species include barking deer, wild boar, fishing cat, leopard cat, jungle cat, large Indian civet, masked palm civet, common palm civet, yellow-throated marten, crab-eating mongoose, golden jackal, Asiatic brush-tailed porcupine, Chinese pangolin and various other species.

== Nisharga Shahayata Prakalpa ==
Beside the National Forest Department, an NGO named "Nisharga", with their "Nisharga Shahayata Prakalpa", observes the park. Besides preserving the forest, they provide eco-tours. The NGO also sells some fancy items there.

== See also ==
- Bhawal National Park
- Lawachara National Park
- List of protected areas of Bangladesh
