= Gracula =

- Diversity and distribution within the genus

Scientific classification
- Kingdom: Animalia
- Phylum: Chordata
- Class: Aves
- Order: Passeriformes
- Family: Sturnidae
- Genus: Gracula; Linnaeus, 1758

Type species
- Gracula religiosa Linnaeus, 1758

Diversity
- See text

Synonyms
- Eulabes

Genus of birds

Gracula is a genus of mynas, tropical members of the starling family of birds found in southern Asia and introduced to Florida in the United States.

== Taxonomy ==
The genus Gracula was introduced in 1758 by the Swedish naturalist Carl Linnaeus in the tenth edition of his Systema Naturae. The genus name is from Latin graculus, an unknown bird sometimes identified as the western jackdaw. Of the seven species listed by Linnaeus, George Gray designated the common hill myna (Gracula religiosa) as the type species.

Until recently only two species were recognised, G. religiosa and G. ptilogenys. Previously, all Gracula were considered to belong to a very variable species commonly called the hill myna. Three additional subspecies of G. religiosa are increasingly being considered as distinct species. Formerly, the Sri Lanka hill myna was considered to be a subspecies of the common hill myna, but today all major authorities recognise them as separate. Comparably, the Enggano, Nias, Tenggara, and southern hill mynas have traditionally been treated as subspecies of the common hill myna; a treatment still preferred by some authorities.

=== Species ===
Four extant species are recognized:

Image	Scientific name	Common name	Distribution
	Gracula ptilogenys	Sri Lanka hill myna	Sri Lanka.
	Gracula religiosa	Common hill myna	Nepal, Sikkim, Bhutan and Arunachal Pradesh, the lower Himalayas
	Gracula indica	Southern hill myna	southwest India and Sri Lanka
	Gracula venerata	Tenggara hill myna	Indonesia

A 2020 study found that the subspecies G. religiosa miotera or Simeulue hill myna, which is endemic to Simeulue, Indonesia and has not been recognized in recent taxonomic arrangements aside from HBW (Handbook of the Birds of the World), also likely represents a distinct species and was likely driven to extinction in the wild in the late 2010s due to unsustainable collecting for the wildlife trade. The paper recommends rescuing the last genetically pure captive individuals for the purpose of captive breeding.

=== Former species ===
Formerly, some authorities also considered the following species (or subspecies) as species within the genus Gracula:

- Magpie-lark (as Gracula picata)

== Description ==
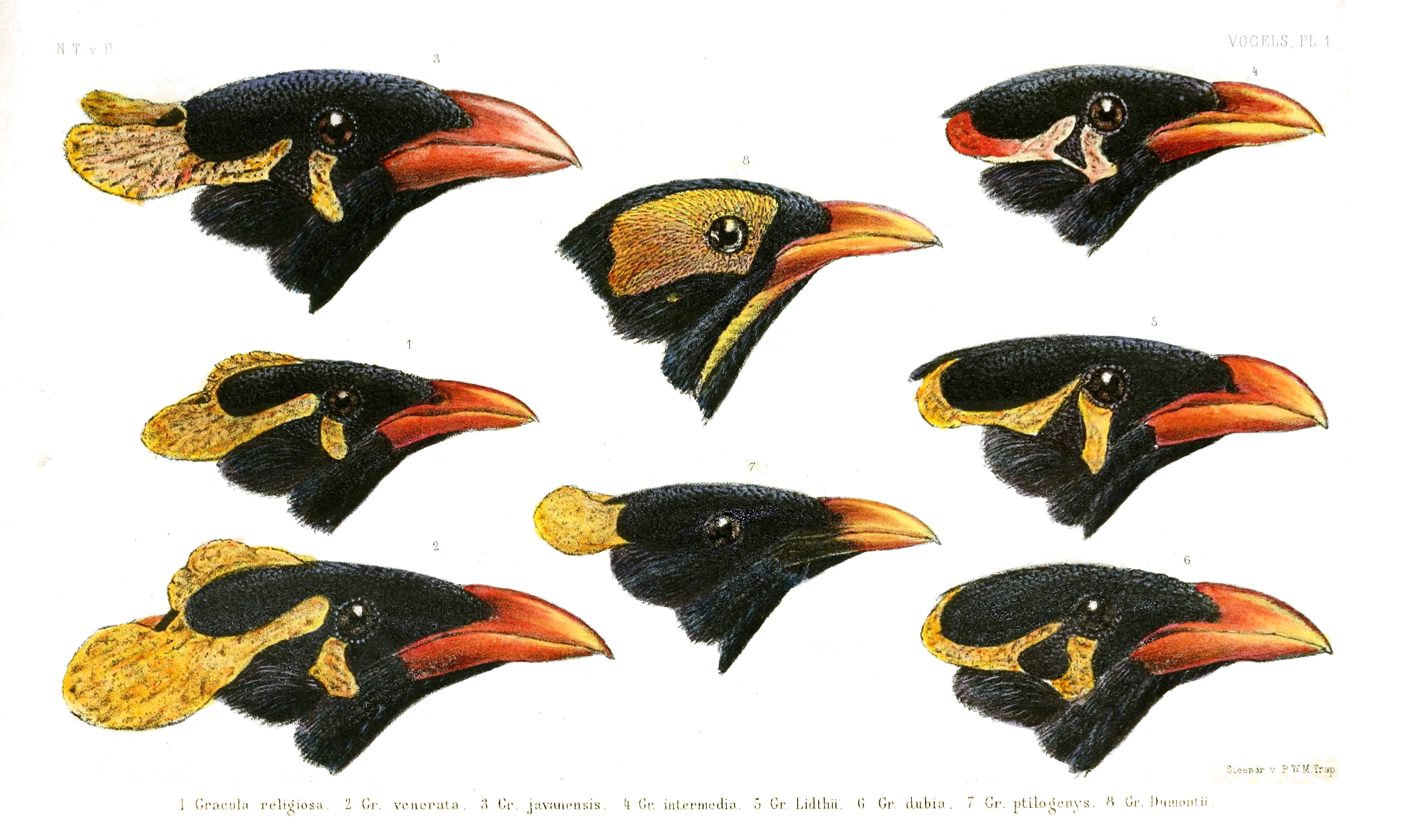
Variations in the wattles and head patterns

These 25–30 cm (9.8–11.8 in) long birds have glossy black plumage and large white wing patches which are obvious in flight. The bill and strong legs are bright yellow or orange, and there are yellow wattles on the head, the shape and position of which vary with species. The sexes are similar, but juveniles have a duller bill.

=== Vocalisations ===
Hill mynas are renowned for their ability to mimic the human voice. It has been claimed that the hill mynah is the best talking bird and the best mimic in the world.

== Distribution and habitat ==
This genus has representatives in tropical southern Asia from India, Bangladesh and Sri Lanka east to Indonesia, and the common hill myna, a popular cage bird, has been introduced to the United States.

== Behaviour and ecology ==
=== Breeding ===
The hill mynas are resident breeders typically found in forest and cultivation. The nest is built in a hole and the usual clutch is two or three eggs.

=== Food and feeding ===
Like most starlings, the hill mynas are fairly omnivorous, eating fruit, nectar and insects.
