= Victoria High School, Sreemongol =

Secondary school in Bangladesh, Sylhet, moulubibazar, sreemongol

Coordinates: 24.3133°N 91.7352°E

Information
- Established: 1924; 101 years ago
- Grades: Class VI to Class X

Victoria High School is a secondary school in the town of Sreemangal, Moulvibazar District, Bangladesh. It was established in 1924 under British rule. The school was managed by an executive committee under the supervision of the education ministry.The school offers classes from Class VI to Class X. It is one of the oldest schools in Sylhet Division.
