= Mirzapur Union (Sreemangal) =

Mirzapur মির্জাপুর
- Union councils of Bangladesh
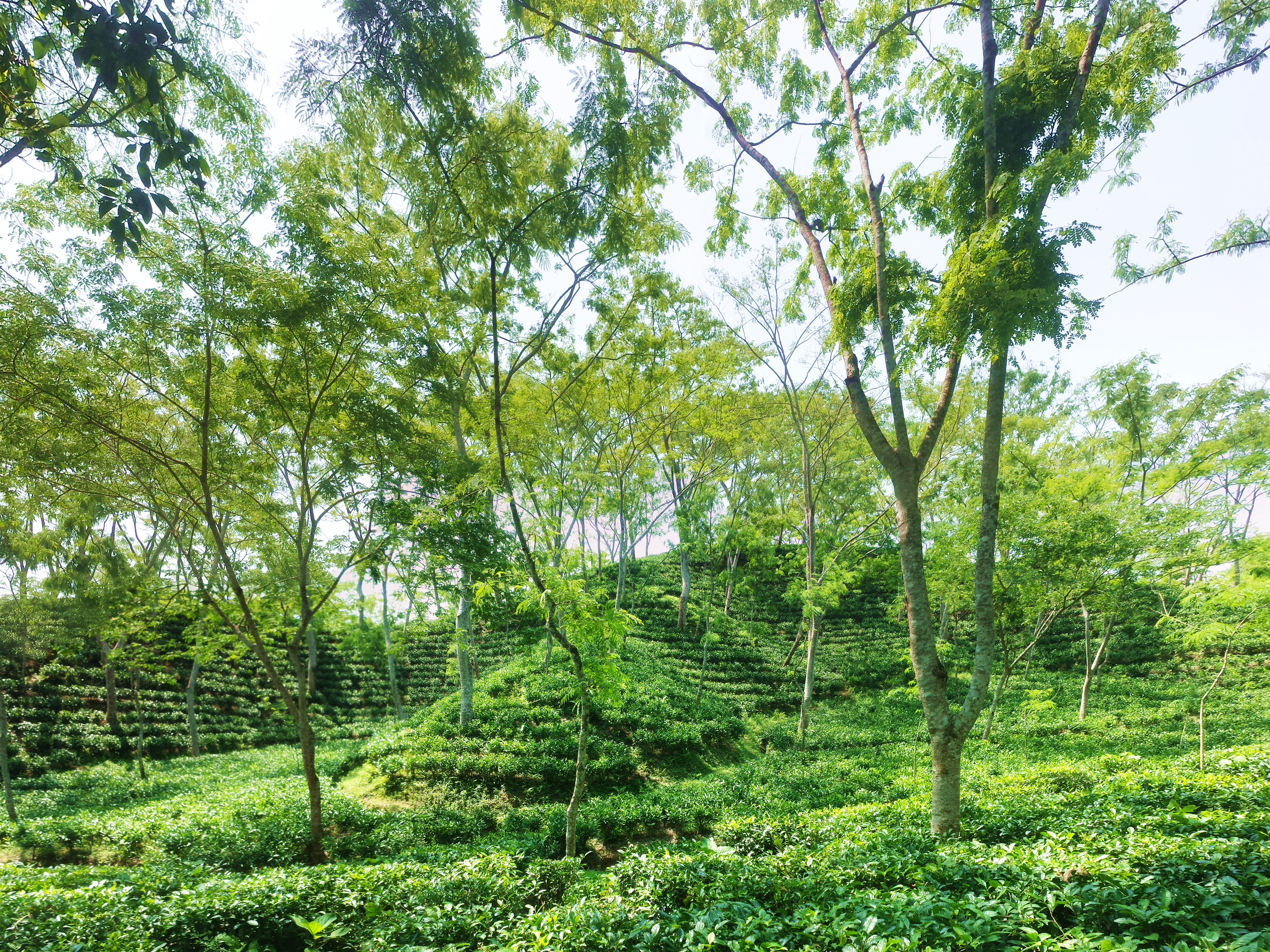
- Tea gardens of Sreemangal
- Interactive map of Mirzapur
- Country: Bangladesh
- Division: Sylhet Division
- District: Moulvibazar District
- Upazila: Sreemangal

Area
  - Total: 47.72 km^{2} (18.42 sq mi)
- Postal Code: 3214
- Website: mirzapurup.moulvibazar.gov.bd

Mirzapur Union (Bengali: মির্জাপুর) is a union in Sreemangal Upazila of Moulvibazar District in the Sylhet Division of Bangladesh.

== Area & Population ==
Area The total area of this union is about 11,793 acres.

Population Its total population is 23,944, of which 12,316 are males and 11,628 are females (ref: according to the 2001 census report conducted by the Bangladesh Bureau of Statistics).

== Public representative ==
The current chairman of the union parishad Mislu Ahmed Chowdhury.

== Industries ==
The famous Bangladeshi Tea Brand Ispahani's factory is located here in this Mirzapur union.
