= Tenggara hill myna =

Conservation status
- Endangered (IUCN 3.1)

Scientific classification
- Kingdom: Animalia
- Phylum: Chordata
- Class: Aves
- Order: Passeriformes
- Family: Sturnidae
- Genus: Gracula
- Species: G. venerata

Binomial name
- Gracula venerata Bonaparte, 1850

Species of bird

The Tenggara hill myna (Gracula venerata) is a member of the starling family. It is a resident of Indonesia.
