= Mohammad Tanzimuddin Khan =

Bangladeshi academic

Mohammad Tanzimuddin Khan is a professor of International Relations at the University of Dhaka. He is a member of the University Grants Commission.

== Early life ==
Khan completed his master's degree in International relations at the University of Dhaka. He completed his second masters at the University of Warwick in International Political Economy. He completed PhD in political ecology at the University of New England.

== Career ==
Khan was a member of a citizens probe committee led by Anu Muhammad and formed in October 2015 to investigate leak of questions for medical college entrance exams.

In July 2018, Bangladesh Chhatra League activists assaulted Khan when he tried to protect students demonstrating for quota reform from the Bangladesh Chhatra League. Students protested the attack on Khan and other faculty members. In August 2021, he signed a statement criticizing the harassment of Asif Nazrul by activists of Bangladesh Chhatra League.

Khan was appointed a member of the University Grants Commission along with professor M. Anwar Hossen in September 2024.

=== Political views ===
Khan signed a statement calling for the release of baul singer Shariat Sarkar who had been detained under the Digital Security Act, 2018 for allegedly harming religious sentiments. He has been critical of the Digital Security Act. In September 2023, Khan signed a statement with 47 other academics calling on the government of Bangladesh to release Adilur Rahman Khan and ASM Nasiruddin Elan. He has been critical of the University of Dhaka as a member of the University Teachers' Network in January 2024. He has criticized student politics. He signed a statement criticizing calls for the shut down of the daily Prothom Alo.

== Bibliography ==
- Neoliberal Development In Bangladesh: People on the Margins cowrote with Mohammad Sajjadur Rahman (University Press Limited)
