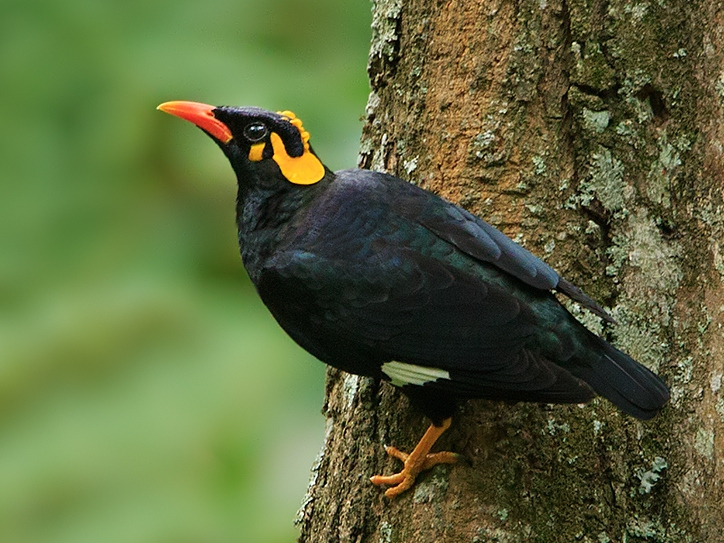
- At Biligirirangan Tiger Reserve

Conservation status
- Least Concern (IUCN 3.1)

Scientific classification
- Kingdom: Animalia
- Phylum: Chordata
- Class: Aves
- Order: Passeriformes
- Family: Sturnidae
- Genus: Gracula
- Species: G. indica

Binomial name
- Gracula indica (Cuvier, 1829)

= Southern hill myna =

Species of bird

The southern hill myna (Gracula indica) is a member of the starling family. It is a resident of the forested regions of south India and Sri Lanka. This species moves around in flocks in the forest, and members of a flock keep in contact with a wide range of vocalizations.

== Etymology ==
The French word for the bird mainate is probably derived from the Indo-Portuguese mainato, from the name of a songbird living near water, and is probably a metaphor since it refers to a man whose job is to wash the clothes of others.

== Description ==
The southern hill myna has a shiny black plumage. It generally measures about twenty centimeters. It can live between 15 and 30 years. The legs are yellow, the beak is bright orange at the base and yellow at the tip. It has white spots on the primary remiges. Like other species of hill myna, the southern hill myna has yellow wattles on the head.

== Habitats and behavior ==
The southern hill myna is present in southwestern India and Sri Lanka. It inhabits tropical and subtropical dry broadleaf forests, mountains, mangrove forests and plantation areas. It is usually found high in the canopy, moving in large noisy groups of about half a dozen, in treetops at the edge of the forest. It hops sideways along the branch. Like most starlings, the hill myna is omnivorous, eating fruit, nectar and insects.

Its voice is melodious, it is able to emit various croaks and calls. The hill myna is considered to be one of the best talking birds, often imitating human sounds and voice, better than parrots. It is also bred in captivity for this particularity. The southern hill myna is claimed to be less vocally gifted than the common hill myna, a very similar species whose range does not overlap.

== Reproduction ==
It builds a nest in a hole in a tree. They are usually two or three eggs in the nest. Male and female birds look alike.

== Conservation status ==
Although the population is declining it is considered "Least Concern" by the IUCN.
