= Sreemangal Upazila =

Sreemangal শ্রীমঙ্গল
- Upazila
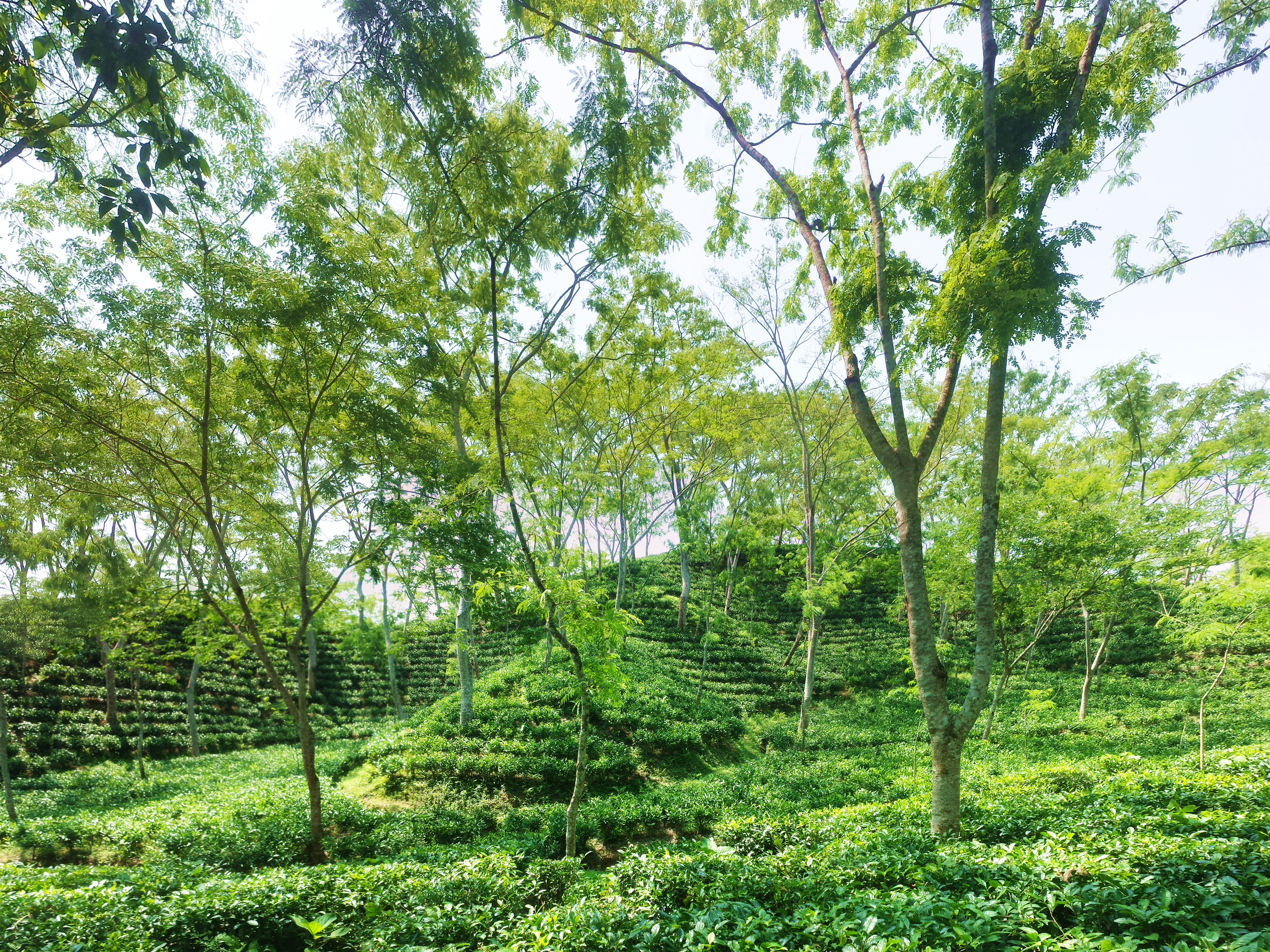
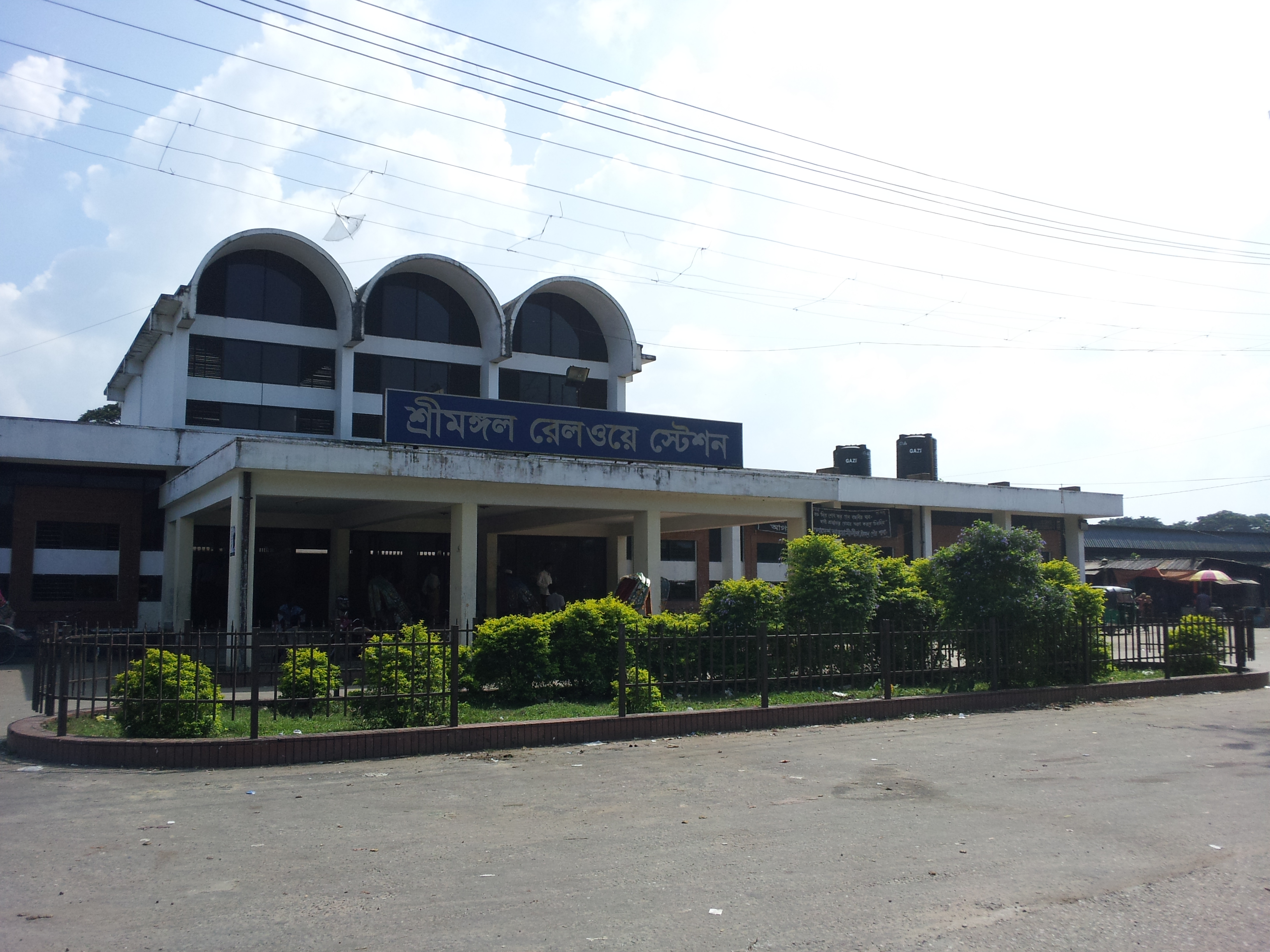
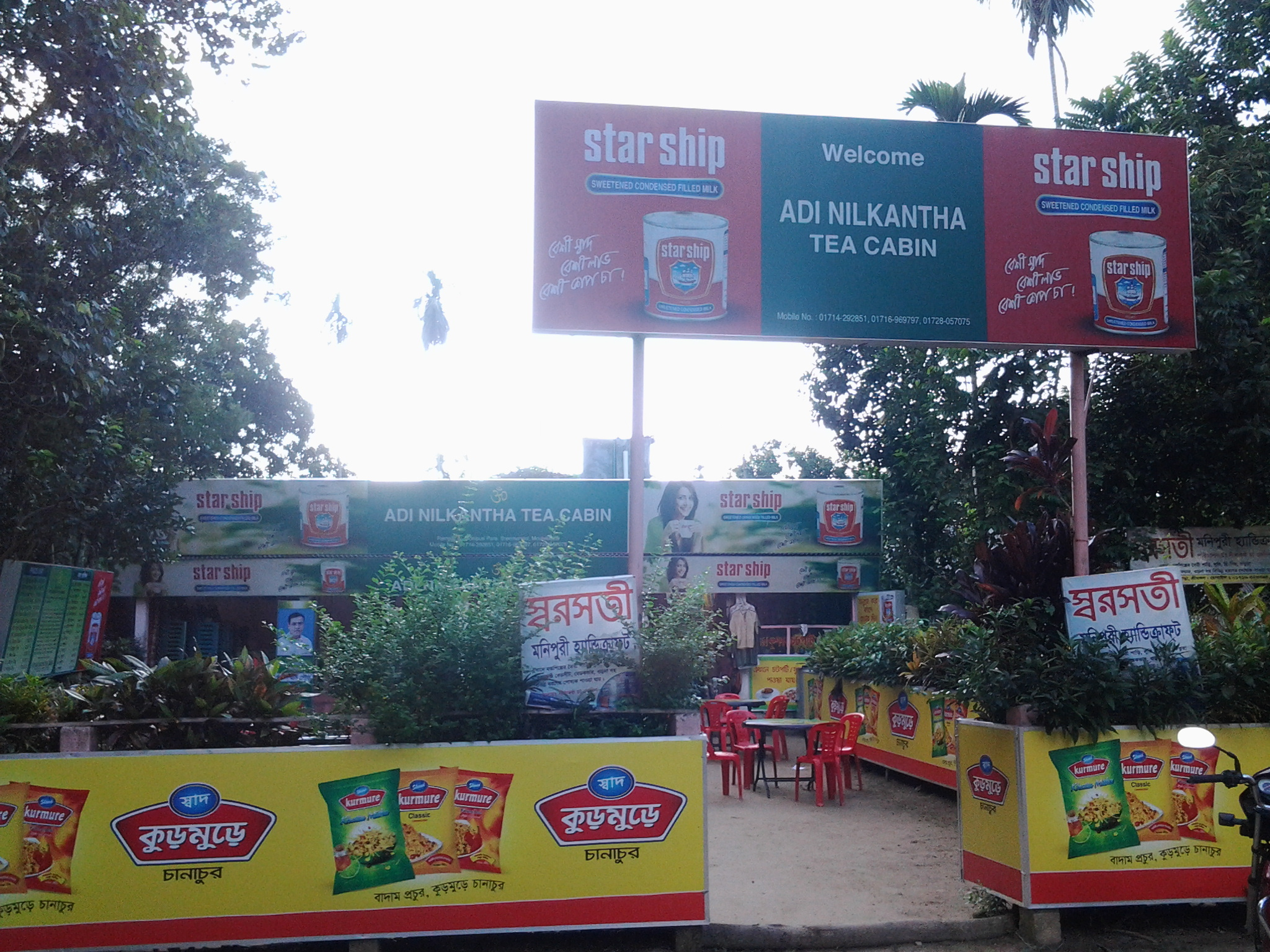
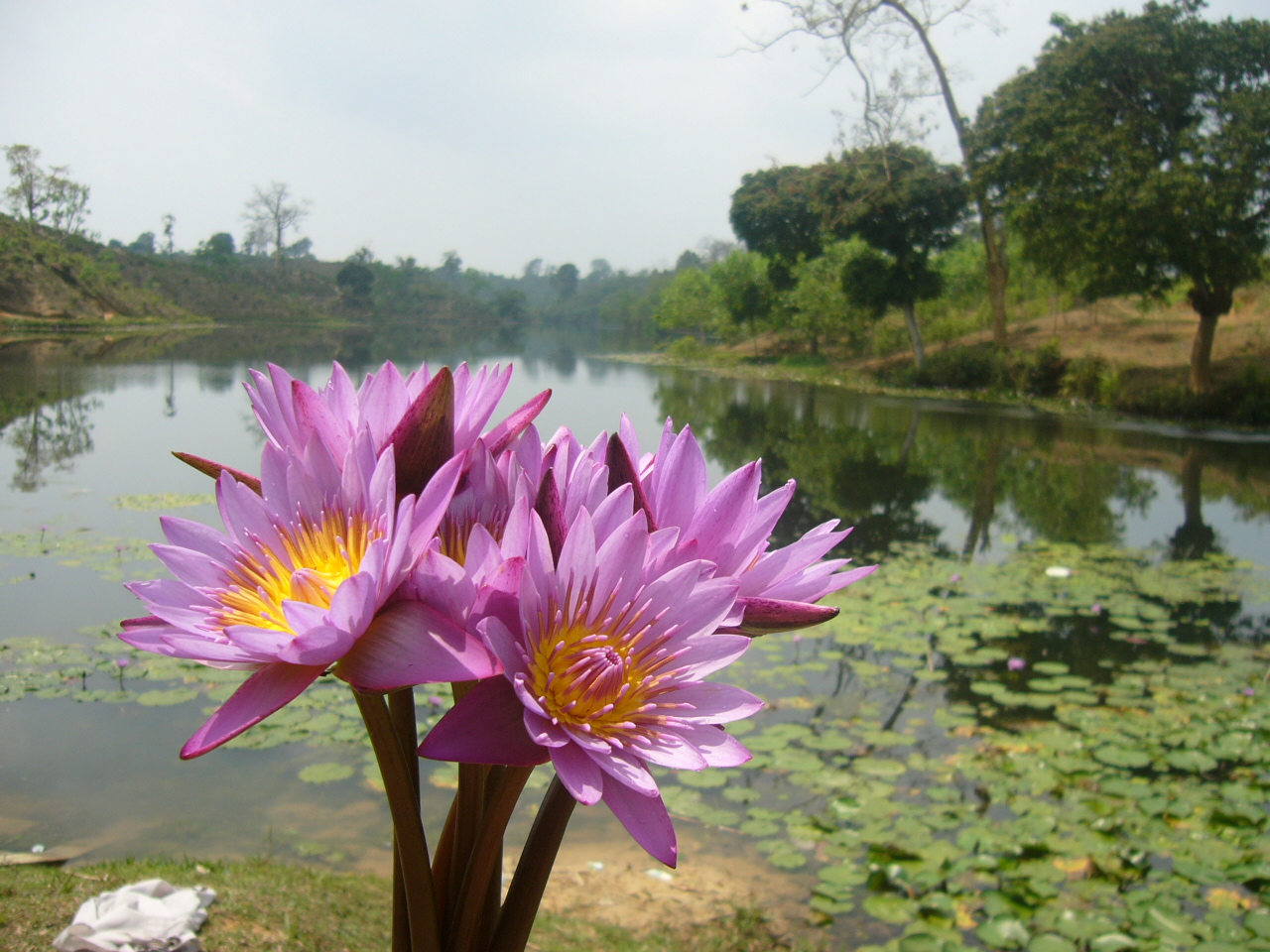
- Tea gardens of Sreemangal Sreemangal Railway station Adi nilkonto tea cabin Madhobpur Lake
- Nickname: Tea Capital
- Country: Bangladesh
- Division: Sylhet
- District: Moulvibazar

Government
  - MP (Moulvibazar-4): Vacant
  - Upazila Chairman: Vacant

Area
  - Total: 450.73 km^{2} (174.03 sq mi)

Population (2022)
  - Total: 361,801
  - Density: 802.70/km^{2} (2,079.0/sq mi)
- Demonym(s): Sreemangali, Srimangali, Srimongoli
- Time zone: UTC+6 (BST)
- Postal code: 3210
- Area code: 08626
- Website: sreemangal.moulvibazar.gov.bd

Sreemangal Upazila mauza geocode map

Sreemangal (Bengali: শ্রীমঙ্গল, romanized: Srimongol) is an upazila of Moulvibazar District in Sylhet Division, Bangladesh. It is located at the southwest of the district, and borders the Habiganj District to the west and the Indian state of Tripura to the south. Sreemangal is often referred to as the 'tea capital' of Bangladesh, and is most famous for its tea fields. Other than tea, the rubber, pineapple, wood, betel, and lemon industries also exist in the upazila.

== History ==
It is believed that the upazila was named after Sri Das and Mangal Das; two brothers who settled on the banks of the Hail Haor. A copper plate of Raja Marundanath from the 11th century was found in Kalapur. During an excavation at Lamua, an ancient statue of Ananta Narayan was dug out. In 1454, the Nirmai Shiva Bari was built and still stands today. Sreemangal thana was established in 1912. The central town later became a pourashava in 1935. In 1963, two peasants were killed by police officers which kicked off the Balishira peasant riots. During the Bangladesh War of Independence of 1971, the Pakistan Army reached Sreemangal on 30 April setting houses on fire and rapes were committed on women. The nearby East Pakistan Rifles camp and local Wapda office premises were among the two mass killing sites. Two mass graves remain in Bharaura with a memorial in North Bharaura.

== Geography ==
Sreemangal is located at 24.3083°N 91.7333°E. It has 65,165 households and total area 450.73 km^{2}. It is bordered by Moulvibazar Sadar to the north, Tripura to the south, Kamalganj to the east and Chunarughat, Nabiganj and Bahubal to the west.

=== Climate ===
Climate data for Srimangal (1991–2020, extremes 1905-present)
Month	Jan	Feb	Mar	Apr	May	Jun	Jul	Aug	Sep	Oct	Nov	Dec	Year
Record high °C (°F)	31.8 (89.2)	34.8 (94.6)	38.0 (100.4)	43.3 (109.9)	38.5 (101.3)	36.5 (97.7)	39.2 (102.6)	37.2 (99.0)	37.7 (99.9)	36.1 (97.0)	35.0 (95.0)	31.9 (89.4)	43.3 (109.9)
Mean daily maximum °C (°F)	25.0 (77.0)	28.3 (82.9)	31.7 (89.1)	32.8 (91.0)	32.2 (90.0)	32.3 (90.1)	32.4 (90.3)	32.8 (91.0)	32.6 (90.7)	31.7 (89.1)	29.7 (85.5)	26.5 (79.7)	30.7 (87.3)
Daily mean °C (°F)	16.2 (61.2)	19.5 (67.1)	23.9 (75.0)	26.4 (79.5)	27.1 (80.8)	27.8 (82.0)	28.0 (82.4)	28.2 (82.8)	27.8 (82.0)	26.2 (79.2)	22.1 (71.8)	17.9 (64.2)	24.3 (75.7)
Mean daily minimum °C (°F)	9.8 (49.6)	12.4 (54.3)	17.4 (63.3)	21.2 (70.2)	23.0 (73.4)	24.8 (76.6)	25.3 (77.5)	25.3 (77.5)	24.8 (76.6)	22.3 (72.1)	16.6 (61.9)	11.8 (53.2)	19.6 (67.3)
Record low °C (°F)	4.0 (39.2)	2.8 (37.0)	8.4 (47.1)	13.5 (56.3)	18.2 (64.8)	18.9 (66.0)	22.0 (71.6)	21.4 (70.5)	20.8 (69.4)	15.7 (60.3)	9.0 (48.2)	5.2 (41.4)	2.8 (37.0)
Average precipitation mm (inches)	7 (0.3)	31 (1.2)	74 (2.9)	213 (8.4)	449 (17.7)	446 (17.6)	352 (13.9)	329 (13.0)	265 (10.4)	174 (6.9)	30 (1.2)	16 (0.6)	2,386 (93.9)
Average precipitation days (≥ 1 mm)	1	3	5	12	19	22	23	22	19	10	2	1	139
Average relative humidity (%)	80	73	70	75	80	84	85	85	85	85	82	81	80
Mean monthly sunshine hours	202.9	220.6	234.1	223.6	195.7	140.0	144.8	157.5	159.7	216.7	239.8	222.0	2,357.4
Source 1: NOAA
Source 2: Bangladesh Meteorological Department (humidity 1981-2010)

== Demographics ==
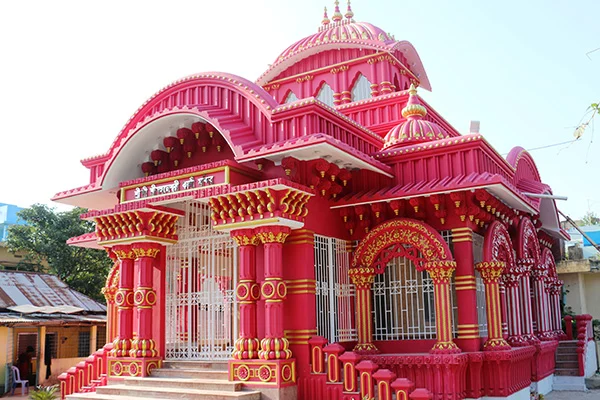
Sri Sri Sreemangal Kali Temple in Sreemangal.

According to the 2022 Bangladeshi census, Sreemangal Upazila had 80,595 households and a population of 361,801. 9.33% of the population were under 5 years of age. Sreemangal had a literacy rate (age 7 and over) of 73.37%: 76.50% for males and 70.34% for females, and a sex ratio of 97.68 males for every 100 females. 34,596 (9.56%) lived in urban areas.

According to the 2011 Census of Bangladesh, Sreemangal Upazila had 65,165 households and a population of 318,025. 74,603 (23.46%) were under 10 years of age. Sreemangal had a literacy rate (age 7 and over) of 48.33%, compared to the national average of 51.8%, and a sex ratio of 1004 females per 1000 males. 39,757 (12.50%) lived in urban areas. Ethnic population was 13,460 (4.23%), of which Santal were 2,796, Khasi 1,665 and Manipuri 735.

As of the 1991 Bangladesh census, Sreemangal has a population of 230,889. Males constitute 51.76% of the total population, and females 48.24%. This Upazila's 18+ population is 124,778. Sreemangal has an average literacy rate of 29.8% (7+ years), and the national average of 32.4% literate. About 58% of this upazila's people are Muslims while 41% are Hindus and others are Christians and Buddhist.

=== Religion and ethnicity ===
Religions in Sreemangal Upazila (2022)
Religion	Percent
Islam	59.13%
Hinduism	39.49%
Christianity	1.33%
Other or not stated	0.05%

Population by religion in Union/Paurashava
Union/Paurashava	Muslim	Hindu	Others
Sreemangal Paurashava	17,337	5,641	345
Ashidron Union	40,482	10,814	345
Bhunabir Union	26,099	12,049	12
Kalapur Union	34,260	9,207	404
Kalighat Union	1,851	23,722	415
Mirzapur Union	21,075	11,626	7
Rajghat Union	1,172	26,766	1,452
Satgaon Union	550	13,348	20
Sindurkhan Union	32,641	4,712	1461
Sreemangal Union	38,456	24,984	518

🟩 Muslim majority 🟧 Hindu majority

Bengali Muslims are the largest group while Bengali Hindus make up a large minority, majority in several unions. Ethnic population is 15434 (4.27%) of which 2513 are Santal, 1741 Garo, 1556 Khasi, 1417 Munda, 1146 Bhumij and 1130 Mahato.

== Economy and tourism ==
Madhobpur Lake is one of the main tourist attractions in the area, and is home to the Great White-Bellied Heron, the only confirmed site in Bangladesh. The Baikka beel is also a nearby body of water and home to the Large-billed reed warbler. Sreemangal has been nicknamed the tea capital of Bangladesh, due to the number of tea gardens in the area, and is the place of origin of the Seven Color Tea. The Bangladesh Tea Research Institute in Sreemangal has made a number of contributions in evolving and standardising the quality of tea, and introducing its research findings to the tea industry of Bangladesh. Pineapples from the Sreemangal area are known for their flavour and natural sweetness. In 2010, the Hum Hum waterfall was discovered and has attracted visitors from all over Bangladesh to Razkandi forest.

== Administration ==
Sreemangal Upazila is divided into Sreemangal Municipality and nine union parishads: Ashidron, Bhunabir, Kalapur, Kalighat, Mirzapur, Rajghat, Satgaon, Sindurkhan, and Sreemangal. The union parishads are subdivided into 108 mauzas and 208 villages.

Sreemangal Municipality is subdivided into 9 wards and 20 mahallas.

== Education ==
According to Banglapedia, Victoria High School, founded in 1924, Bhunabir Dashrath High School & College Founded in 1896, is a notable secondary school. The Jamia Luthfia Anwarul Uloom Hamidnagar is a notable madrasa and Islamic centre in the Sylhet region.

== Notable people ==
- Om family
- Sitesh Ranjan Deb, wildlife conservationist, operates a mini-zoo at Rupashpur.

== See also ==
- Magurchara Punji
- Shaharsree
