= Meitei language in Assam =

Meitei language in Assam (Meitei: ꯑꯁꯥꯝꯗ ꯃꯩꯇꯩꯂꯣꯟ/অসামদা মৈতৈলোন)
- Manipuri language in Assam (Meitei: ꯑꯁꯥꯝꯗ ꯃꯅꯤꯄꯨꯔꯤ ꯂꯣꯟ/অসামদা মণিপুরী লোন)
- Meiteilon/Manipuri lon
- Meitei language written in Meitei script and Bengali script
- Native to: Cachar district; Dima Hasao district (Note: though not declared official language status of this district); Hailakandi district; Hojai district; Karimganj district
- Region: Barak Valley and Brahmaputra Valley (Dima Hasao district and Hojai district)
- Ethnicity: Meitei people
- Native speakers: 300,000 (2024 estimate)
- Language family: Sino-Tibetan family
- Standard forms: Standard Meitei (Standard Manipuri)
- Writing system: Meitei script; Bengali script; Naoriya Phullo script (specific to Assam)

Official status
- Official language in: India: Assam
- Development body: Manipuri Sahitya Parishad, Assam; Department of Manipuri, Assam University

Language codes
- ISO 639-2: mni
- ISO 639-3: mni
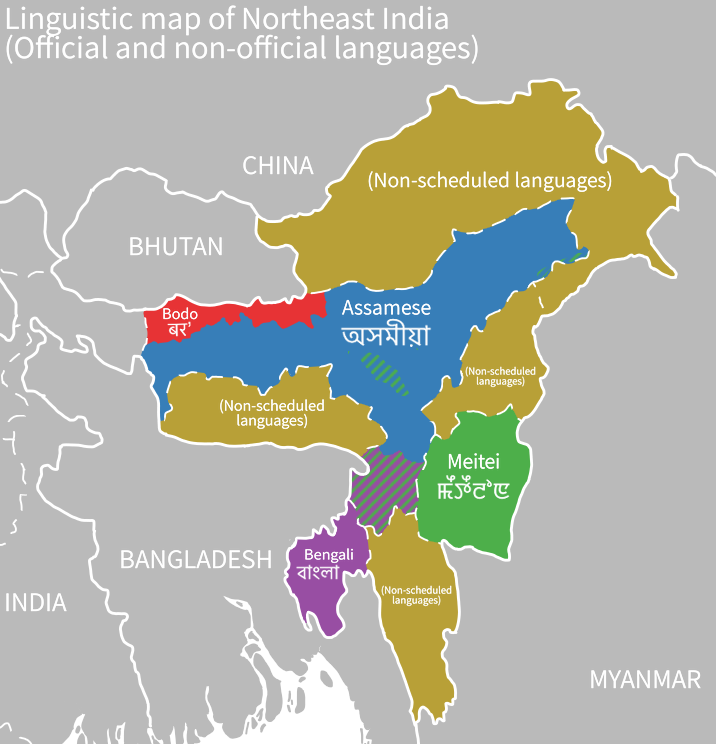
- Meitei (highlighted in green) is official in four districts of Assam state, besides its neighbors.

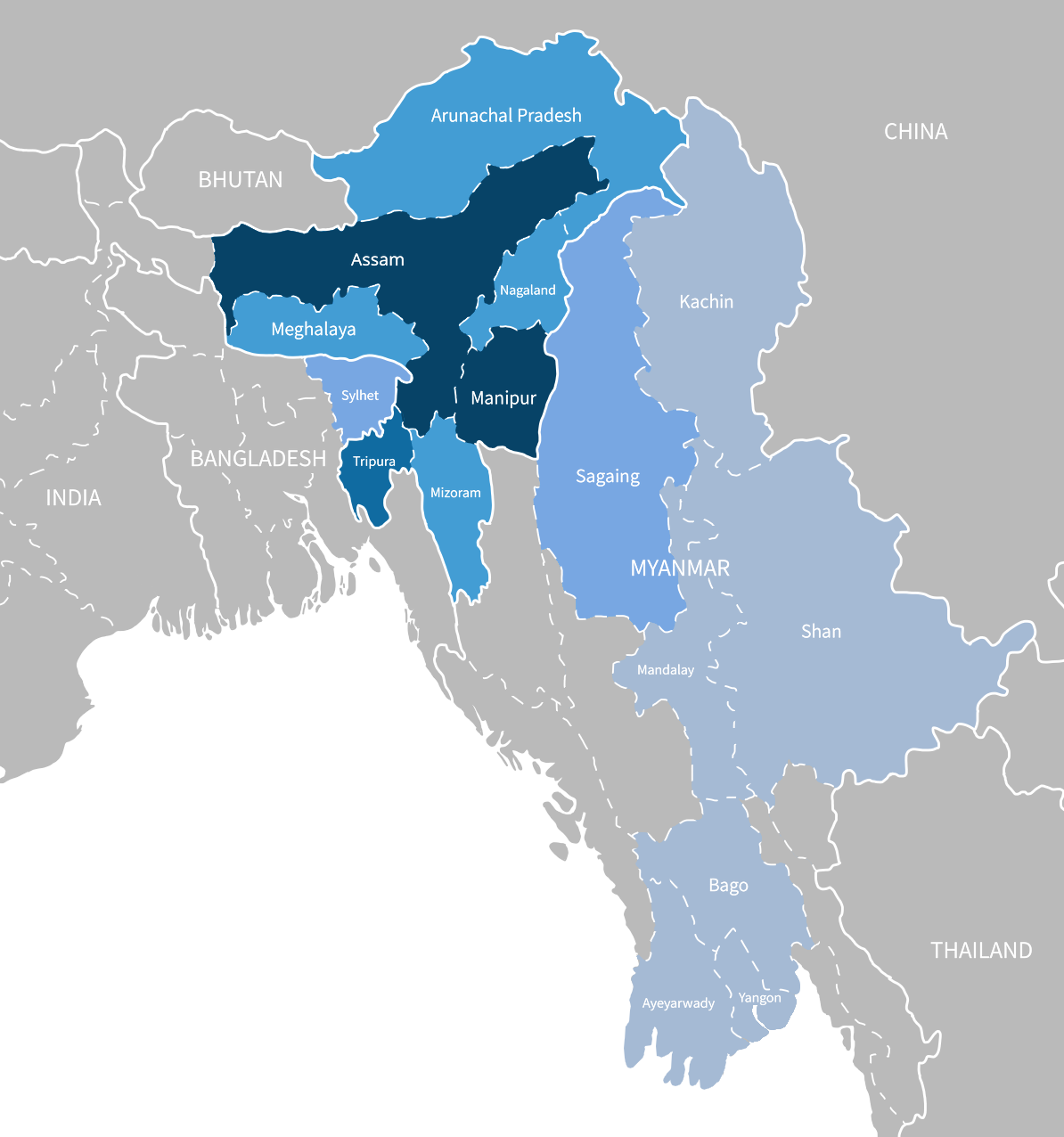
- Meitei (highlighted in dark blue) is recognised as an official, educational and indigenous language in Assam, besides in Manipur.

Meitei language (Meitei: ꯃꯩꯇꯩ ꯂꯣꯟ/মৈতৈ লোন, romanized: Meitei Lon), officially and formally known as Manipuri language (Meitei: ꯃꯅꯤꯄꯨꯔꯤ ꯂꯣꯟ/মণিপুরী লোন, romanized: Manipuri Lon), is one of the official languages of the state government of Assam. It serves as the additional official language in all the three districts of the Barak Valley (Cachar district, Hailakandi district and Karimganj district) as well as in the Hojai district of Assam.

== History ==
Meitei speaking people started living in Assam as a result of migration from Manipur due to the Chahi Taret Khuntakpa (literally, Seven Years' Devastation).

== Geographical distribution ==
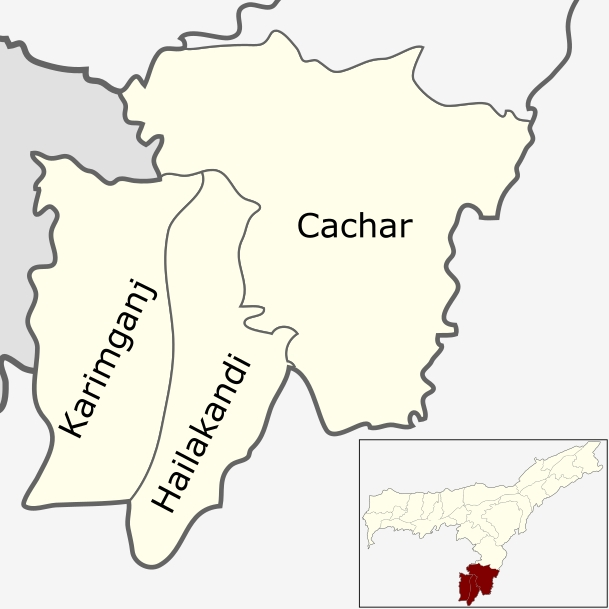
Meitei language speakers have a notable presence in the Barak Valley of Assam.

Meitei language speakers have a notable presence in the Hojai district of the Brahmaputra Valley of Assam.

Meitei language speakers live in all the three districts of the Barak Valley, Cachar, Hailakandi and Karimganj districts, as significant minority population. According to the Ethnologue, it also has a notable presence in Dima Hasao district, besides those of the Barak Valley. It also has a notable presence in the Hojai district of Assam.

== Writing systems ==
=== Meitei Mayek script ===
In 2024, the State Cabinet of the Government of Assam approved the Meitei script to be used in the education of Meitei language across all the academic institutions of Assam. It was done to help the students interested in the Meitei literature (also known as Manipuri literature) to know better about the subject.

=== Meetei Yelhou Mayek script ===
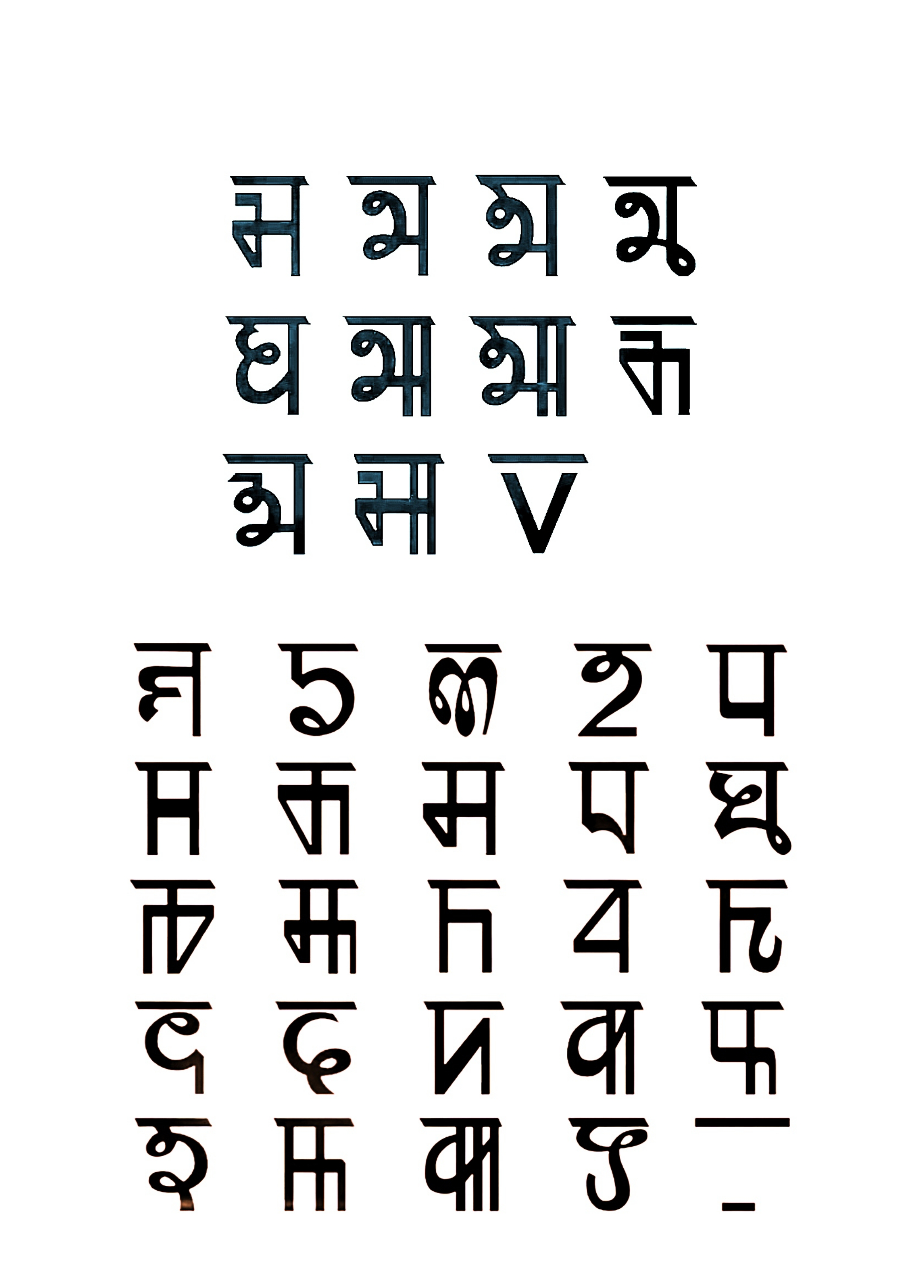
The vowel and consonant letters of the Naoriya Phulo script (invented Meetei Yelhou Mayek), a constructed script developed by Naoriya Phulo for writing Meitei language

A unique form of writing system called "Meetei Yelhou Mayek", distinct from the general Meitei script, was developed by Naoriya Phulo in Cachar, Assam. This script was used to write Meitei language in certain cultural contexts.

== Linguistic movements ==
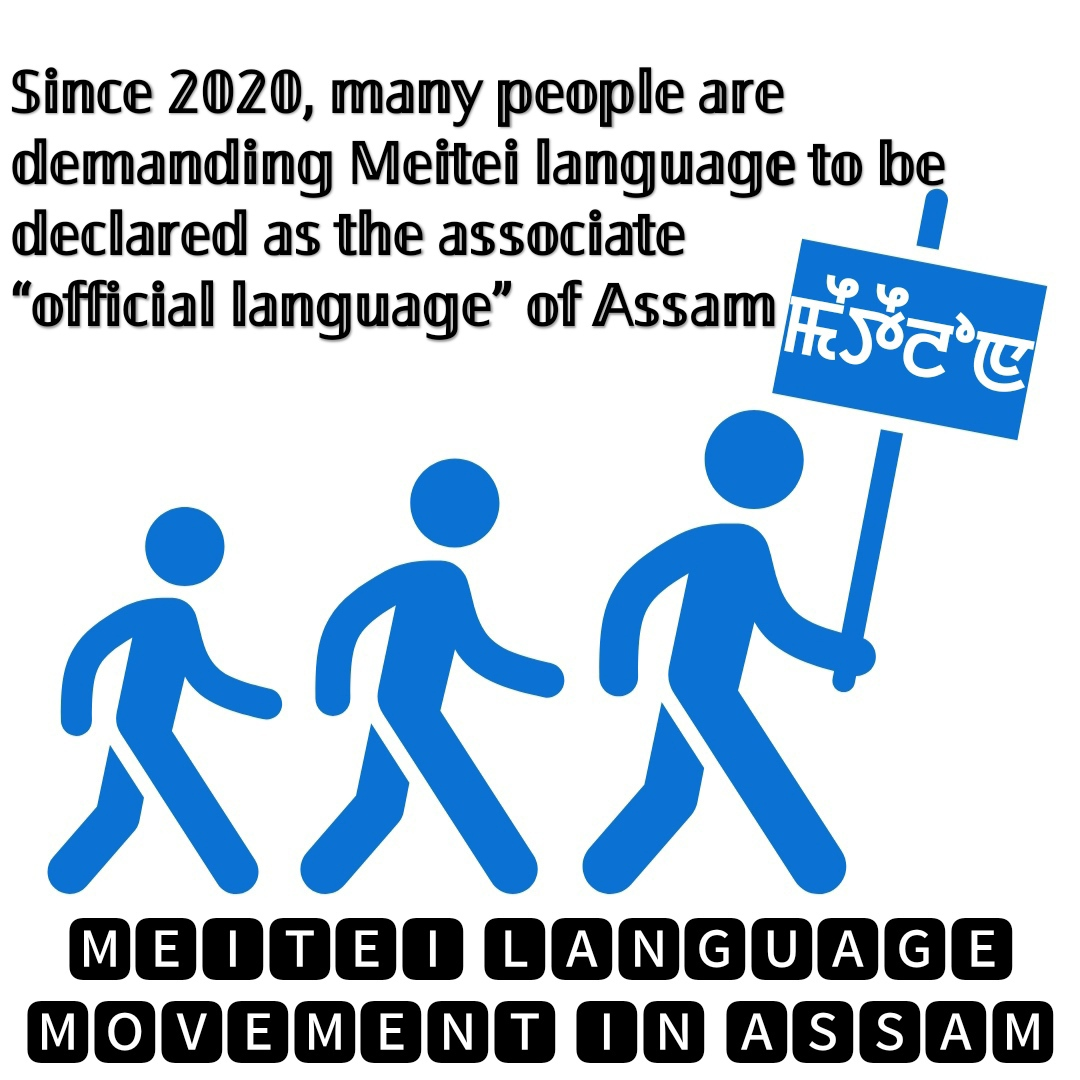
A depiction of the successful historical movement demanding Meitei to be made an official language of Assam

In Assam, many people had organised a language movement, demanding that Meitei language be made one of the official languages of Assam, besides Assamese language. As a part of the movement, in 2023, they walked more than 300 km long march, as a sign of protests demanding their democratic rights. In the same year, Leishemba Sanajaoba, the titular king and an Indian member of Parliament of Manipur, wrote a letter to the government of Assam, to look into the matter. In 2024, the government of Assam approved the request, by declaring Meitei as the additional official language of four districts of Assam, namely Cachar district, Hailakandi district, Karimganj district and Hojai district.

Meitei speaking people from Assam also work on the language movement demanding that Meitei be given the officially recognised classical language status by the Union Government of India.

== Education ==
The Board of Secondary Education, Assam (SEBA) and the Assam Higher Secondary Education Council (AHSEC) provides Meitei language education in the schools of Assam.

Assam University of Silchar has a "Department of Manipuri", providing education up to PhD degrees. Gauhati University also provides Meitei language education as an independent subject.

Meitei language education is offered having independent departments for the language, in different colleges of Assam, including but not limited to the Cachar College, the Gurucharan College, the Lala Rural College, Hailakandi, the Patharkandi College, the Janata College, Kabuganj, etc.

== Literature ==
Starting from 2020, the Government of Assam provides a financial support of ₹5 lakh (equivalent to ₹5.9 lakh or US$6,100 in 2023) every year to the Manipuri Sahitya Parishad, a group that works for the development of Meitei literature (also called Manipuri literature) in Assam as well as other Meitei populated states. Moreover, the government also gave ₹6 crore (equivalent to ₹7.1 crore or US$730,000 in 2023) for the development of Meitei language corpus.

== Language day ==
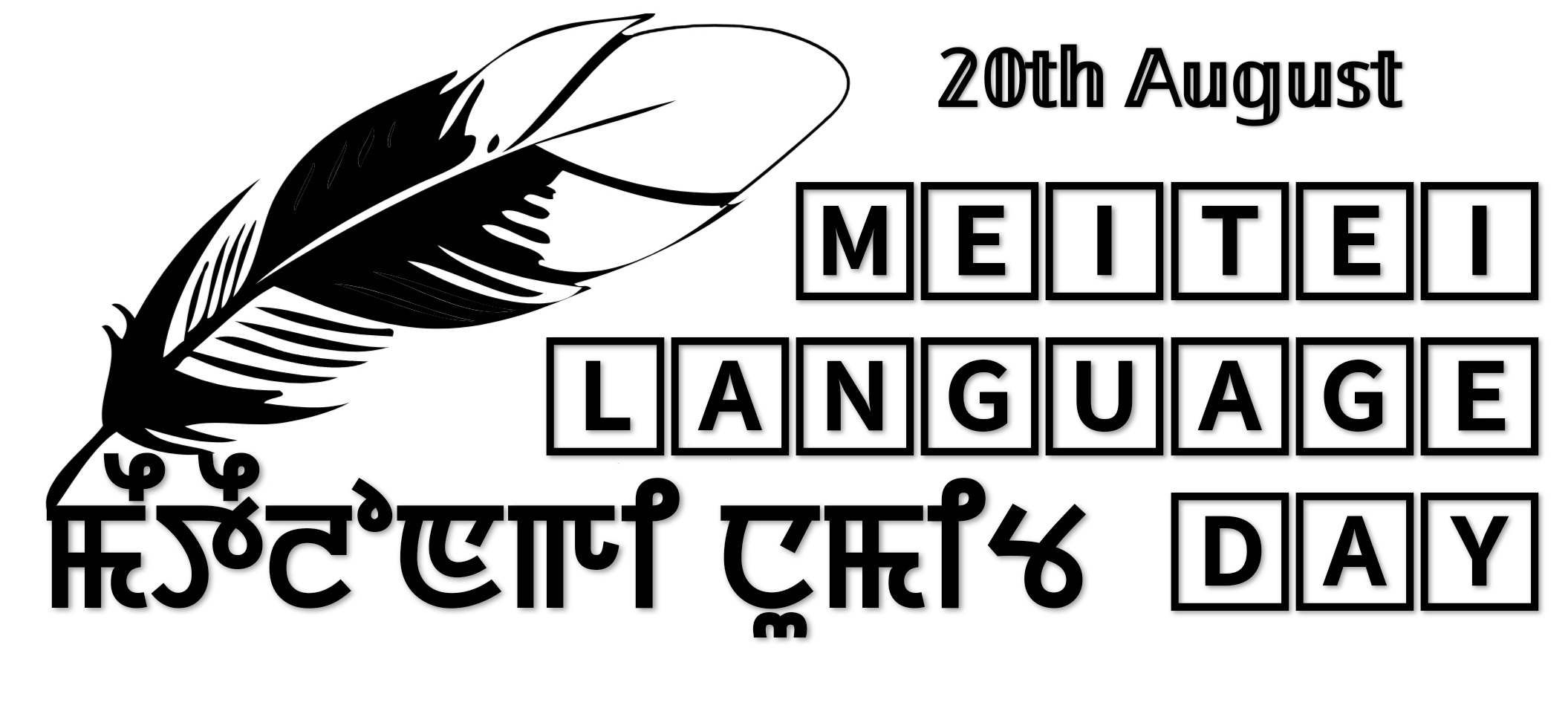
Meitei language day — 20th August

In Assam, Manipuri Language Day, also known as Meitei language day, is celebrated, like it is done in other states every year. The event is celebrated to honour the day on which Meitei was made an official language recognised by the Eighth Schedule to the Constitution of India. The notable groups that celebrate the event are Manipuri Sahitya Parishad, Asam Sahitya Sabha, Department of Manipuri, Assam University.

== Cinema ==
Meitei language movies are often shown in different film festivals in Assam, including the Brahmaputra Valley Film Festival (BVFF), in Guwahati. In 2023, a Meitei language movie named "Nine Hills One Valley", directed by Haobam Pabankumar, was shown in the event.

"Phisakhol" (Meitei: ꯐꯤꯁꯥꯈꯣꯜ) is the first Meitei language movie having its debut in the Silchar city of the Barak Valley in Assam.

== Associations and organizations ==
The following groups took active participation in the historic Meitei associate official language movement in Assam:

- All Manipur Students' Union (AMSU)
- Assam Manipuri Meira Paibi Lup
- Assam Manipuri Sahitya Parishad
- All Assam Manipuri Muslim Youth Front
- All Assam Manipuri Students Union (AAMSU)
- Guwahati Manipuri Coordination Committee (GMCC)
- Manipuri Youth Front of Assam (MYFA)
- Union of Association of Manipuri Writers
- Youth's Action Committee for Protection of Indigenous People (YACPIP)

== See also ==
- Manipuri Literary And Cultural Forum
- Meitei linguistic purism movement
- Meitei poetry day (Manipuri poetry day)
- Bangladesh Manipuri Sahitya Sangsad
- Meitei scheduled language movement
