= Thangjam Leikai =

Thangjam Leikai Thangjam Leikai
- Village
- Country: India
- State: Assam
- District: Cacher
- Sub-Division: Silchar

Population (2010)
  - Total: 850
- Demonym(s): Thangjam, Amoldar
- PIN: 788119
- ISO 3166 code: IN-AS

Thangjam Leikai is a small village in the Cachar district of Indian state of Assam. The village is also known as "Thangjamleikai" in short. It is registered as "Dakshin Mohanpur Part-II" in official revenue document. Non-Meitei people of its surrounding area call this village "Amoldar".

Bengali and Meitei (Manipuri) are the official languages of this place.

== Gallery ==
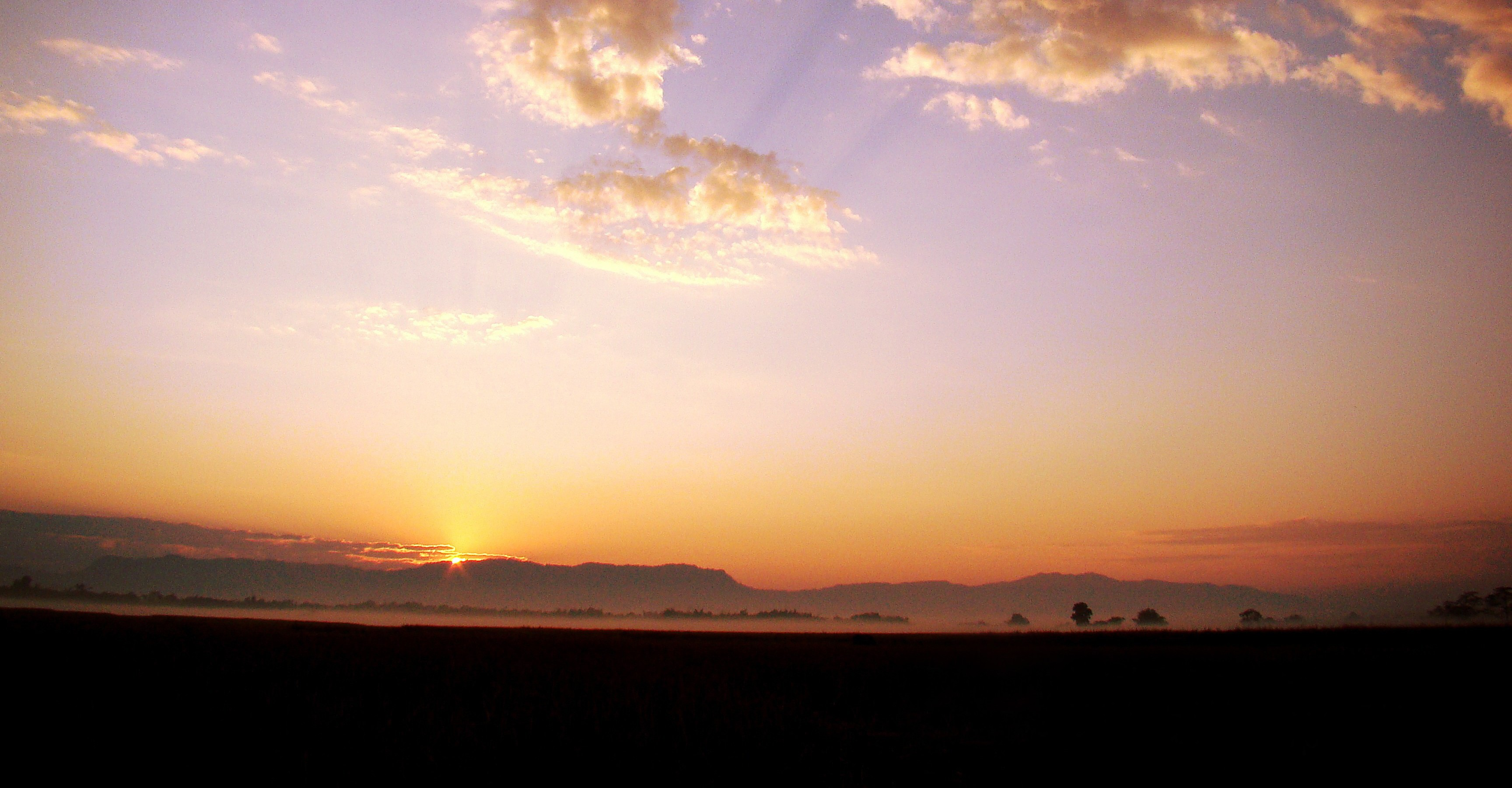
Sunrise in Thangjamleikai

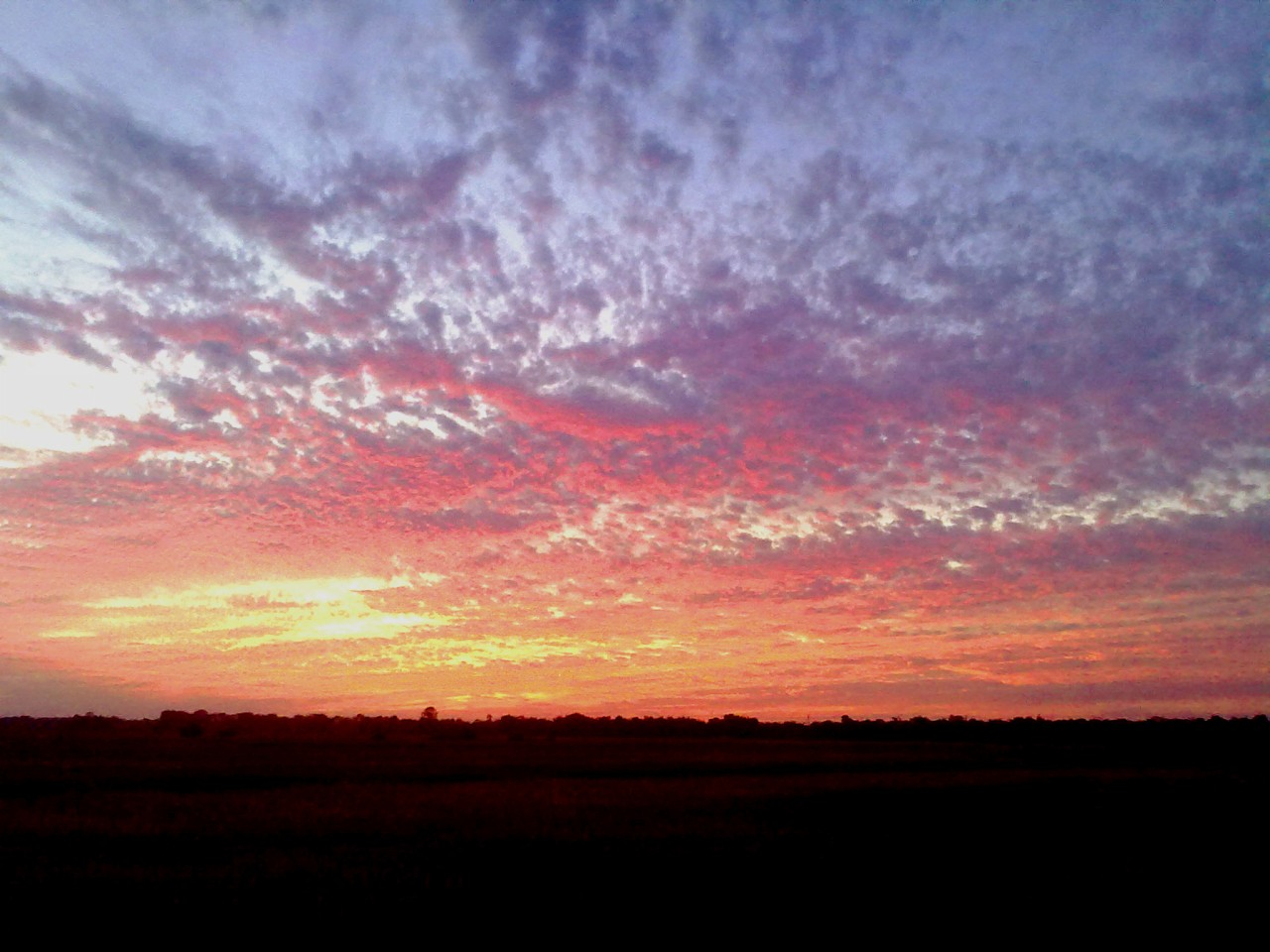
Sunset in Thangjamleikai

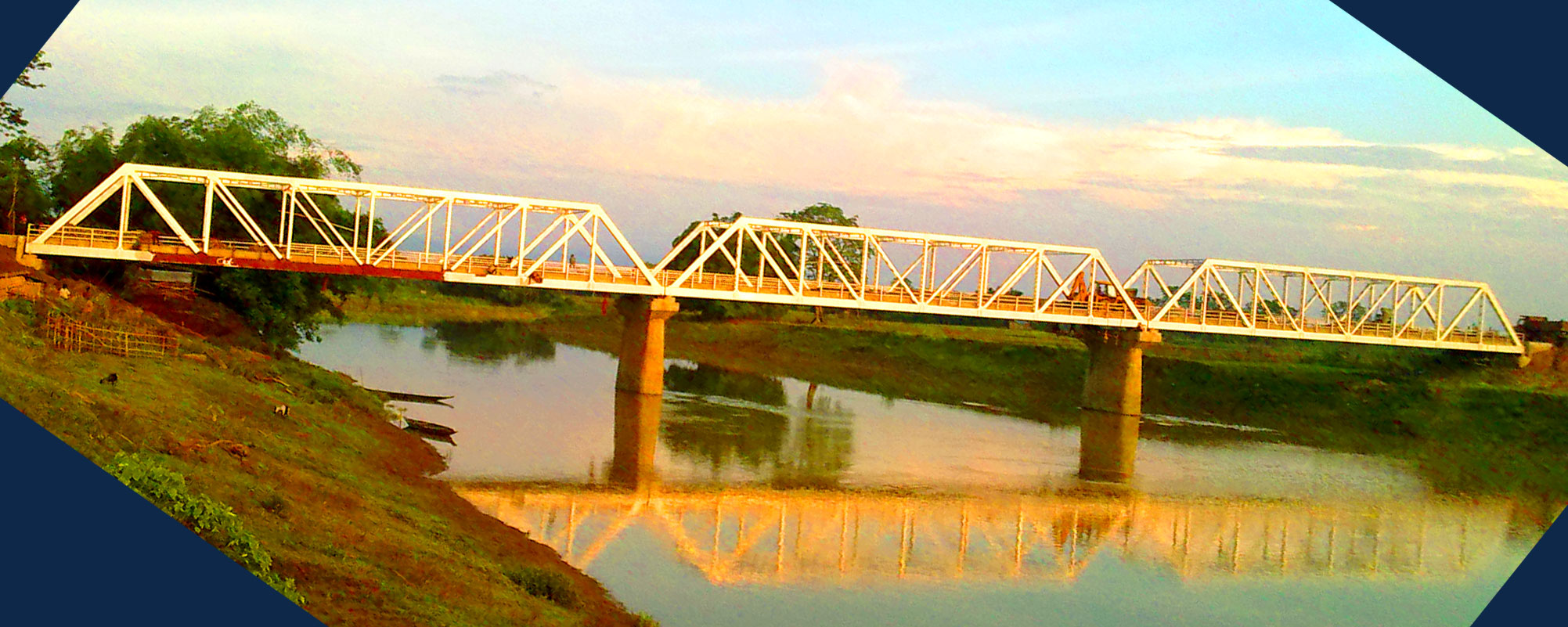
VEIROBI BRIDGE of Thangjamleikai
