= Chatla =

Chatla Bengali: চাতলা হাওর
- Wetland
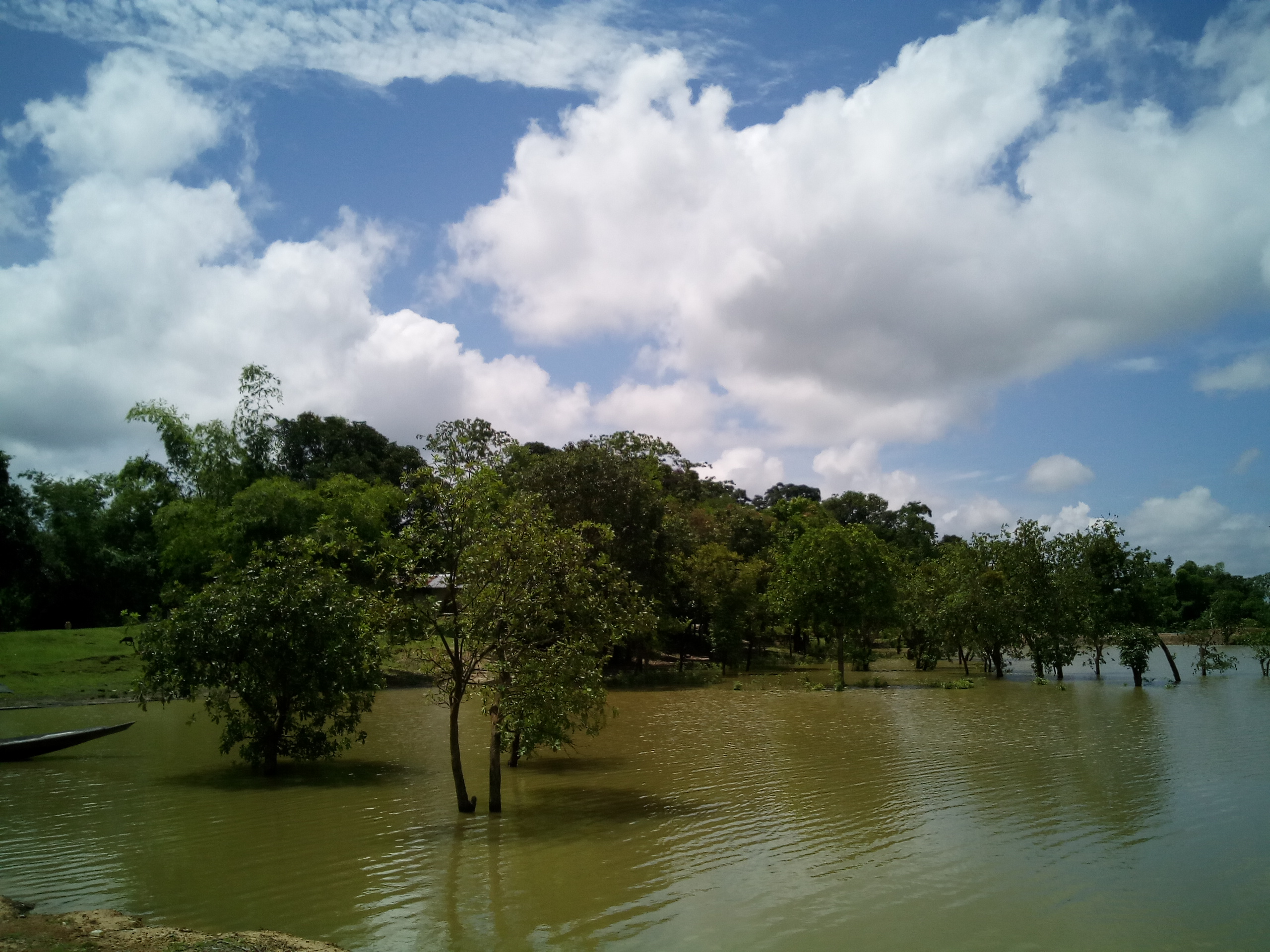
- Chatla on July
- Interactive map of Chatla
- Country: India
- State: Assam
- Headquarters: Silchar
- Time zone: UTC+05:30 (IST)
- Geocode: 24°42′40″N 92°44′30″E
- ISO 3166 code: IN-AS-CA
- Official language: Bengali (Bangla)
- Website: chatlavisit.wordpress.com

Chatla Wetland: (Bengali: চাতলা হাওর) is a seasonal wetland in the state of Assam in India.

Chatla (Chatla Wetland) is one of the lakes in southern Assam in India. It is situated in the Cachar district, and it is a wetland in Assam state. The specialty of Chatla is that during winter season is becomes fully farm land where Rice cultivation is done and after winter from March onward this piece land gets filled up with water and become a lake.Moreover, this (Chatla haor) is the main indigenous tea garden labor during British rule.

Chatla Wetland is located in the District Cachar of the state Assam. The residents of Chatla are mainly of Bengali, Chatla haor’ is a seasonal wetland where people are engaged in agriculture during dry period (October–March) while the wetland act as a fishery during wet period (April- September). Chatla is located near the second largest town of Assam, Silchar. The main language spoken here is Sylheti by the Bengali population. Rice is the staple food and fish is also available.

== Geography of Chatla ==
The climate of Chatla is tropical in nature. The summer is usually hot and humid with heavy rainfall at times. The winter season starts from the month of November and continues till February. The heavy rainfall at Chatla raises flood at times. Chatlar had also seen Four major floods in the year 1986, 1991, 2004 and 2007.

== Transport ==
Chatla is 15 kilometres (9.3 mi) away from Silchar.
