= Kanakpur Part-II =

- city
- Location in Assam, India Kanakpur Part-II (India)
- Coordinates: 24°48′37″N 92°48′27″E
- Country: India
- State: Assam
- District: Cachar

Area
  - Total: 2.12 km^{2} (0.82 sq mi)

Population (2011)
  - Total: 9,519
  - Density: 4,490/km^{2} (11,600/sq mi)

Languages
  - Official: Bengali and Meitei (Manipuri)
- Time zone: UTC+5:30 (IST)
- Vehicle registration: AS

Kanakpur Part-II is a census town in Cachar district in the Indian state of Assam.

== Demographics ==
Bengali and Meitei (Manipuri) are the official languages of this place.

As of 2011 India census, Kanakpur Part-II had a population of 7,089. There are 4,817 males and 4,702 females. Kanakpur Part-II has an average literacy rate of 88.95%, higher than the national average of 74.04%: male literacy is 91.99%, and female literacy is 85.82%. In Kanakpur Part-II, 1,121 persons are under 6 years of age.
