= Subir Kar =

Subir Kar (1941 – 6 February 2019) was a professor, author and litterateur from Barak Valley, India.

Known for having clinical expertise on language, Kar was admired among the intellectual and academic circles of the region. He authored many books during his career as an educationist. He worked in Karimganj College before joining the Assam University. He was former head of the department of Bengali in Assam University

== Personal life ==
Kar was born in 1941. He was married to Shukla Kar. He died on 6 February 2019, after a long battle with cancer with cancer.

== Books ==
- 1857 in North East: A Reconstruction from Folk and Oral Sources
- Barak Upatyakar Bhasa Sangramer Itihas
