= Dainik Prantajyoti =

Indian newspaper

Dainik Prantajyoti (Bengali: দৈনিক প্রান্তজ্যোতি) is a Bengali daily newspaper published from Silchar, Assam.
