= Radhamadhab College =

Degree college in Assam, India

Coordinates: 24.8088°N 92.8008°E

- Seal of the college
- Type: Government College
- Established: 1971
- Affiliations: Assam University, UGC, IGNOU
- Principal: Dr. Debashish Roy
- Faculty: 22
- Administrative staff: 10
- Location: Silchar – 788006, Assam, India, Silchar, Assam, India
- Campus: Urban
- Website: http://www.rmcollege.org/

Radhamadhab College is a provincialised college located at Silchar, Assam, India, and is affiliated to Assam University. It offers courses in 10+2, undergraduate levels. The college also offers short-term courses to its students.
