= Manipuri Poetry Day =

Annual event in India for Meitei literature

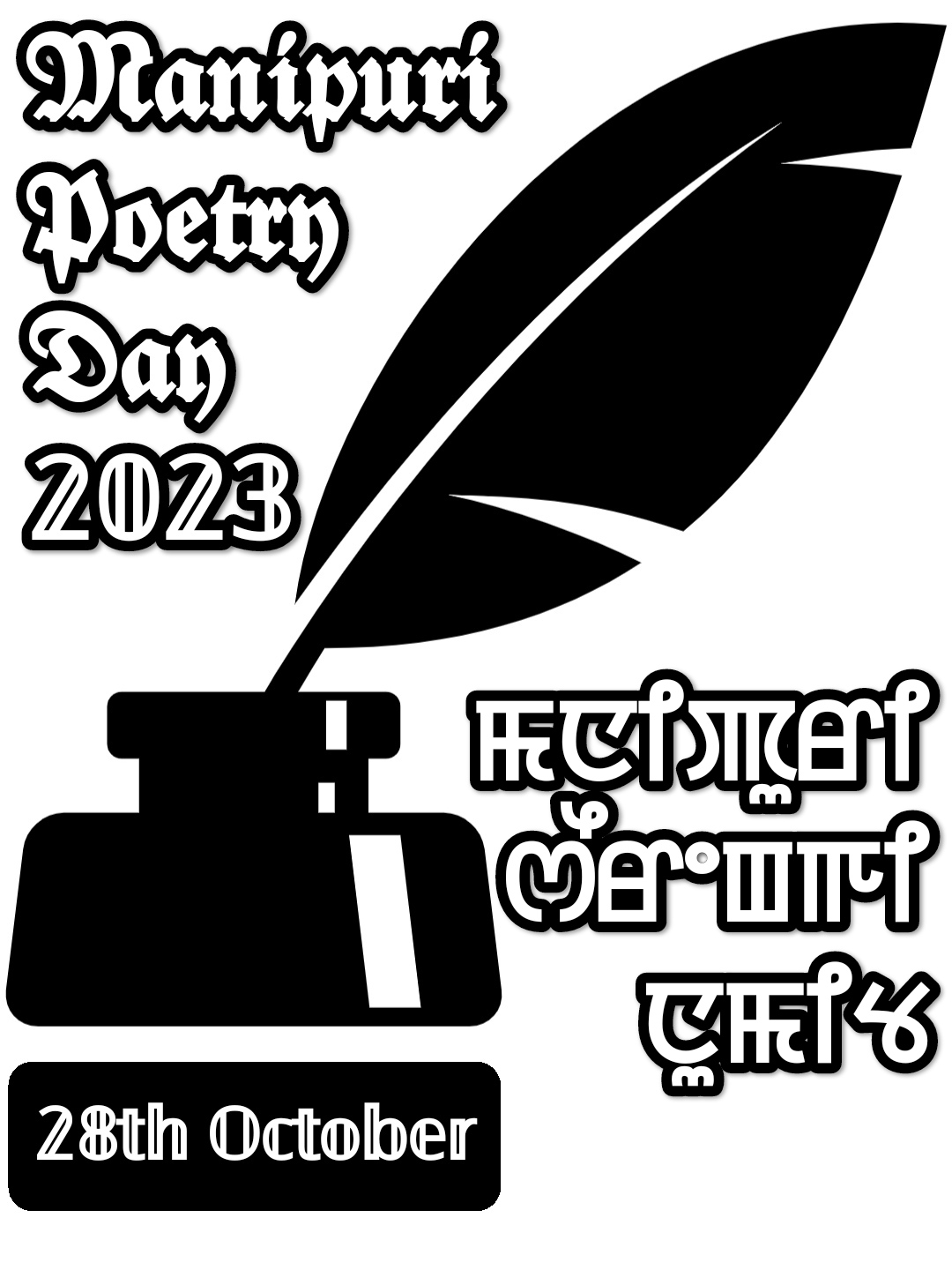
- Native name: Meitei: Meiteilon Sheirenggi Numit
- English name: Meitei poetry day
- Time: Meragee Thanil (full moon day of the Meitei lunar month of "Mera")
- Venue: Manipur, other Northeast Indian states and West Bengal.
- Type: annual literary event
- Theme: Meitei-language poetry
- Organised by: Sahitya Akademi; Divine Life Club, Langthabal; Fiction and Poetry Club, Manipur; JN Manipur Dance Academy; Manipur Dramatic Union, Yaiskul; Naharol Sahitya Premee Samiti, Imphal; St. Joseph University, Nagaland; Manipuri in Kolkata; Manipur Bhavan, Kolkata

Manipuri poetry day (Meitei: Manipuri Sheirenggi Numit), also known as Meitei Poetry Day, is an annual literary event organised to promote Meitei language (Manipuri) poetry. It takes place Manipur as well as in other Meitei-speaking areas, and aims to promote Manipuri literature to the world. It honours the contributions of the Meitei poets as well as the diverse and distinctive literary traditions of Manipur.

== Dates of celebrations ==
- 9 October, 2022
- 13 October, 2019

== Organisers ==
National

- Sahitya Akademi

Manipur

- Manipuri Sahitya Parishad, Jiribam
- Divine Life Club, Langthabal
- Fiction and Poetry Club, Manipur
- JN Manipur Dance Academy
- Manipur Dramatic Union, Yaiskul
- Naharol Sahitya Premee Samiti, Imphal

Nagalan

- St. Joseph University, Nagaland (SJU)

West Bengal

- Manipuri in Kolkata
- Manipur Bhavan, Kolkata

== See also ==
- Meitei language movement
- Meitei Chanu (poem)
- Khamba Thoibi Sheireng
- Numit Kappa
- Tha Tha Thabungton
- Sana Leibak Manipur
