= Silchar Part-X =

- city
- Location in Assam, India Silchar Part-X (India)
- Coordinates: 24.8167°N 92.8°E
- Country: India
- State: Assam
- District: Cachar

Population (2001)
  - Total: 5,313

Languages
  - Official: Bengali and Meitei (Manipuri)
- Time zone: UTC+5:30 (IST)
- Vehicle registration: AS

Silchar Part-X is a census town in Cachar district in the Indian state of Assam.

== Demographics ==
Bengali and Meitei (Manipuri) are the official languages of this place.

As of 2001 India census, Silchar Part-X had a population of 5,313. Males constitute 52% of the population and females 48%. Silchar Part-X has an average literacy rate of 66%, higher than the national average of 59.5%: male literacy is 80%, and female literacy is 51%. In Silchar Part-X, 15% of the population is under 6 years of age.
