= 2022 Silchar Floods =

Natural disaster in Assam, India

- Date: 19 June 2022 – 30 June 2022
- Location: 32 districts of North East India
- Deaths: 200+

The 2022 Silchar Floods were floods that occurred in the state of Assam, India beginning 19 June 2022 as a part of 2022 Assam–Bangladesh floods due to a breach of dyke of the Barak River at Bethkundi. The flooding affected 5.4 million people across 32 districts and caused the deaths of over 200 people across the affected districts. Silchar town, located just 1 km from the dyke was the worst affected, with 90 percent of the town underwater. While there are several reasons that caused the floods in the region to the extent that it did, there is a definite man-made aspect to the degree of damage that it caused. The Chief Minister of Assam, Himanta Biswa Sharma also noted this in his address to the people.

On 2 July, one man named Kabul Khan was arrested for breaching the embankment which caused the floods. He had also taken a video of the breach. By 6 July, 3 more people were arrested for the deed. The Chief Minister of Assam Himanta Biswa Sarma said that the flood was a man made calamity and those responsible would face a harsh punishment. He termed the act as a sabotage.

Silchar city remained submerged for 11 days, with water rising up to 12 feet (3.7 metres) in some places.
