= Cachar Club =

Coordinates: 24°49′45.26″N 92°47′59.94″E

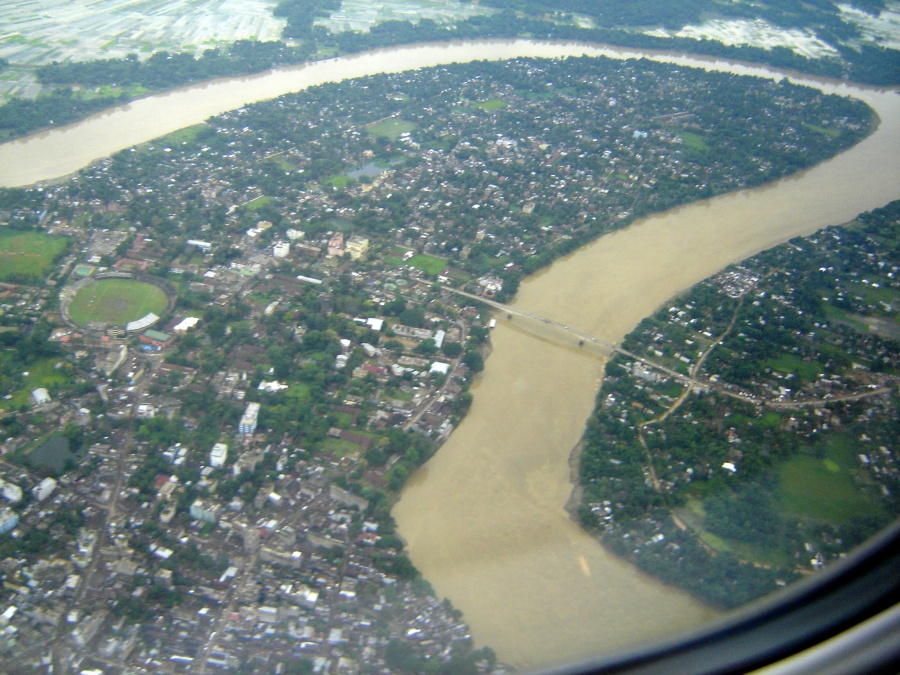
Aerial view of settlement around Sadarghat Bridge over the Barak River in Silchar

The Cachar Club is a club located in Silchar, India. It was opened in 1859 by colonial British who were engaged in the tea planting business. Initially, membership was open to only Europeans, but this opened up to include Indians as well. The club-house is in a colonial style, and was completely renovated in February 2008. The club has a restaurant, bar, accommodation, a health club and conference hall.

The members helped develop the modern game of Polo during the later years of the 19th century.

== See also ==
- List of India's gentlemen's clubs
