= Women's College, Silchar =

Women's higher education institution in India

Coordinates: 24.8239°N 92.7971°E

Women’s College, Silchar
- Logo of Women's College
- Type: Government College
- Established: 1963
- Affiliations: Assam University
- Principal: Dr. Sujit Tiwari
- Location: Shyama Prasad Road, Silchar - 788001, Assam, Silchar, Assam, India
- Campus: Urban
- Website: Official site

Women's College, Silchar, established in 1963, is a higher educational institution in Silchar, Assam, India. It offers three-year and four-year undergraduate courses in languages (English, Bengali, Hindi, and Manipuri), social sciences (Economics, Political Science, History, and Education), and other disciplines (Commerce, Mass Communication, Computer Application, and Environmental Science). Additionally, it offers higher secondary (pre-university) courses in Arts and Commerce entailing the above-stated subjects, and various short-term diploma and certificate courses. It is recognised by the University Grants Commission (UGC), Assam University, Silchar, and Assam Higher Secondary Education Council. The college has been accredited by National Assessment and Accreditation Council (NAAC).
