= Meitei Chanu (poem) =

Meitei language poem by Lamabam Kamal

- by Lamabam Kamal
- Original title: Meitei Chanu
- First published in: Meitei Chanu (magazine)
- Country: Manipur Kingdom (before merging into the Indian Republic (Note: The poem was published in the year 1924 and Manipur was merged into the Indian Republic on 21 September 1949.))
- Language: Meitei language (officially known as Manipuri language)
- Meter: or
- Publication date: 1924

Meitei Chanu (Meitei: /mə́i.təi cə.nu/, lit. "Meitei woman") is a Meitei language poem by Lamabam Kamal. It was first published in a magazine, with the same name, called Meitei Chanu (magazine) in the year 1924. It was republished in the author's book of his collection of poems called "Lei Pareng" in the year 1929. Its central theme is the reconfiguration of the identity of the Meitei people. The poem bountifully reflects the poet's love of his motherland and its heritage.

== Analysis ==
The text of the poem shows the feminization of the language and its literature. The opening stanza of the poem remarkably implies that the idea of a literary tradition is embodied in the form of a temple that remains empty without a goddess for a very long time. This is a metaphor for an important transformation in history as Mother Meitei: ꯏꯃꯥ, romanized: /í.ma/) or the Meitei Lady (Meitei: ꯃꯩꯇꯩ ꯆꯅꯨ, romanized: /mə́i.təi cə.nu/) re-occupies the temple. She is able to return to her temple due to western education, imitation, and feminization of language and literature.

The poet emphasises original and the vernacular inspiration and poetic elements to construct the temple of Meitei Chanu, countering a common belief that the Meitei language is insufficient for literary expression. He also imagines a pan-Meitei consciousness expressed through the temple's construction that could end the sickly (Meitei: ꯁꯤꯔꯨꯝ ꯅꯥꯔꯨꯝ, romanized: /si.rum nā.rum/) Meiteis. Meitei unity is necessary to rebuild the temple .

According to the author, the temple should be made up of flowers and its purpose should be to spread across the world and to bloom in the universities. He says that all Meiteis should consider themselves as the children of Meitei Chanu so that the garland of flowers (Meitei: ꯂꯩ ꯄꯔꯦꯡ, romanized: /ləi pə.reŋ/, symbolising "unity") remains strong.

Nearness (Meitei: ꯑꯅꯛꯄ, romanized: /ə.nək.pə/,) becomes the central point of the Meitei world, thereby softly referring to Imphal as the cosmic holy place to the Meitei ethnicity.

== Bibliography ==
- Singh, Lamabam Damodar (2000). L. Kamal Singh. Sahitya Akademi. ISBN 978-81-260-0856-8.
- Lei Pareng Amasung Thainagee Leirang (in Manipuri). Manipur State Kala Academy, Imphal. 1999. pp. 9–11.
