= Sonai River =

Indian river

The Sonai River was a river in the North 24 Parganas district of West Bengal, India.

Human development activity filled in portions of the river, leaving only sporadic ponds with many dried sections of the river route.

Drained areas near Amudia and Hakimpur near the national border have been used by Jamaat-ul-Mujahideen Bangladesh terrorists as a route to invade India.
