= Janata College =

General degree college in Assam, India

- Type: Public
- Established: 1964
- Affiliations: Assam University
- Location: Kabuganj, Cachar district, Assam, India
- Website: http://janatacollege.in/

Janata College, established in 1964, is a general degree college situated at Kabuganj, in Cachar district, Assam. This college is affiliated with the Assam University.

== Departments ==
=== Arts ===
- Bengali
- English
- Manipuri
- Hindi
- History
- Economics
- Philosophy
- Political Science

Principals of the College 1) Late Sri Binod Behari Nath (Founder Principal) 2) Late Sri Subhas Chandra Nath 3) Late Sri Rajendralal Nath 4) Late Sri Sushil Chandra Dey 5) Late Sri Dilip Kumar Deb Mazumder 6) Dr. Sujit K Ghosh 7) Smt. Nandita Dutta Roy 8) Smt. Nivanani Devi 9) Dr. Suprabir Dutta Roy 10) Sri Subhas Chandra Nath

== See also ==
- Department of Manipuri, Assam University
