= Cachar district =

Coordinates: 25°05′N 92°55′E

- District of Assam
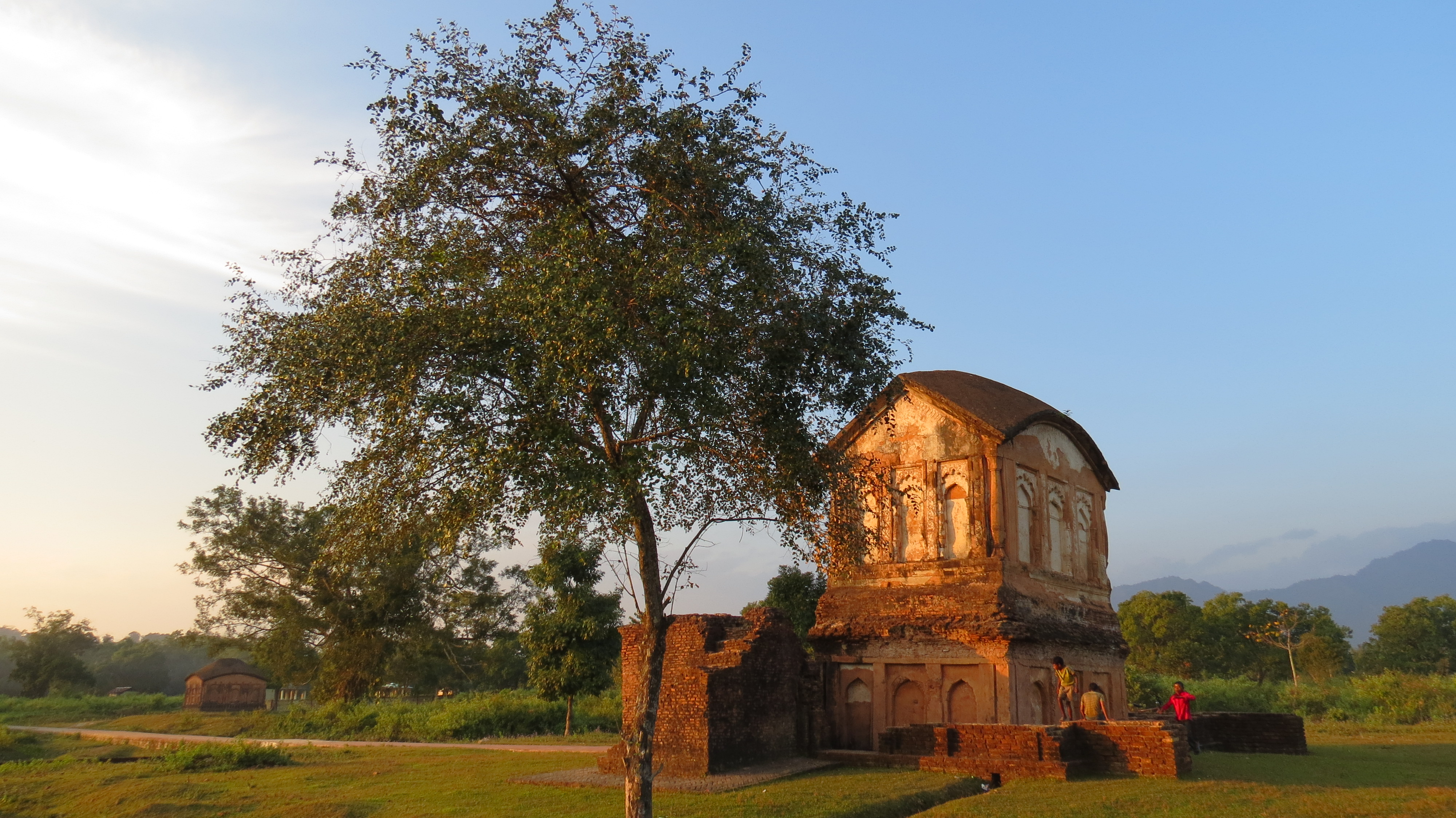
- Ruins of Kachari kingdom

- Location in Assam
- Country: India
- State: Assam
- Division: Barak Valley
- Headquarters: Silchar

Government
  - Lok Sabha constituencies: Silchar
  - Vidhan Sabha constituencies: Silchar, Sonai, Dholai, Udharbond, Lakhipur, Barkhola, Katigorah

Area
  - Total: 3,786 km^{2} (1,462 sq mi)

Population (2011)
  - Total: 1,736,617
  - Density: 458.7/km^{2} (1,188/sq mi)
- Time zone: UTC+05:30 (IST)
- ISO 3166 code: IN-AS-CA
- Vehicle registration: AS-11
- Official language: Bengali
- Associate official language: Meitei (Manipuri)
- Website: cachar.gov.in

Cachar district is an administrative district in the state of Assam in India. After independence, the pre-existing undivided Cachar district was split into four districts: Dima Hasao (formerly North Cachar Hills), Hailakandi, Karimganj, and the current Cachar district. Silchar is Cachar district's center of government.

== Etymology ==
The British believed that the word Kachar is derived from Dimasa Kachari.

Historian J. B. Bhattacharjee stated that Cachar got its name from Bengalis of Sylhet. He argues that, while Sir Edward Gait contended that Cachar got its name from kacharis, Gait also noted that the word "Kachar " was derived from a Sanskrit word meaning " a broadening region. ". Bhattacharjee states that not only were the ruling Dimasa tribe known to people of Sylhet as Kacharis, the Bengalis living in Cachar were known as such as well. J. B. Bhattacharjee in his book quotes Dr. P. N. Bhattacharjee as follows:

Mr. Gait is of opinion that 'the kacharis' have given their name to the district of Cachar , We might as well be told that The Romans gave the name Rome. The fact is that the name has been given to the district by the Bengalis of Sylhet, because it is an outlying place skirting the mountains. The word 'kachhar' is still used in Sylhet in designating a plot of land at the foot of a mountain.

== History ==
=== Pre-independence period ===
According to Bhatera Copper Plate, issued by Govinda-Keasavadeva ruler of Srihatta-Rajya, a proto Bengali kingdom ruled many places which now falls in present day Cachar. Places like Kalain, Salchapra and katakhal find their mention on the Copper plate which dates back to 1049 A.D. The plate also mention of a local Bengali Dialect.

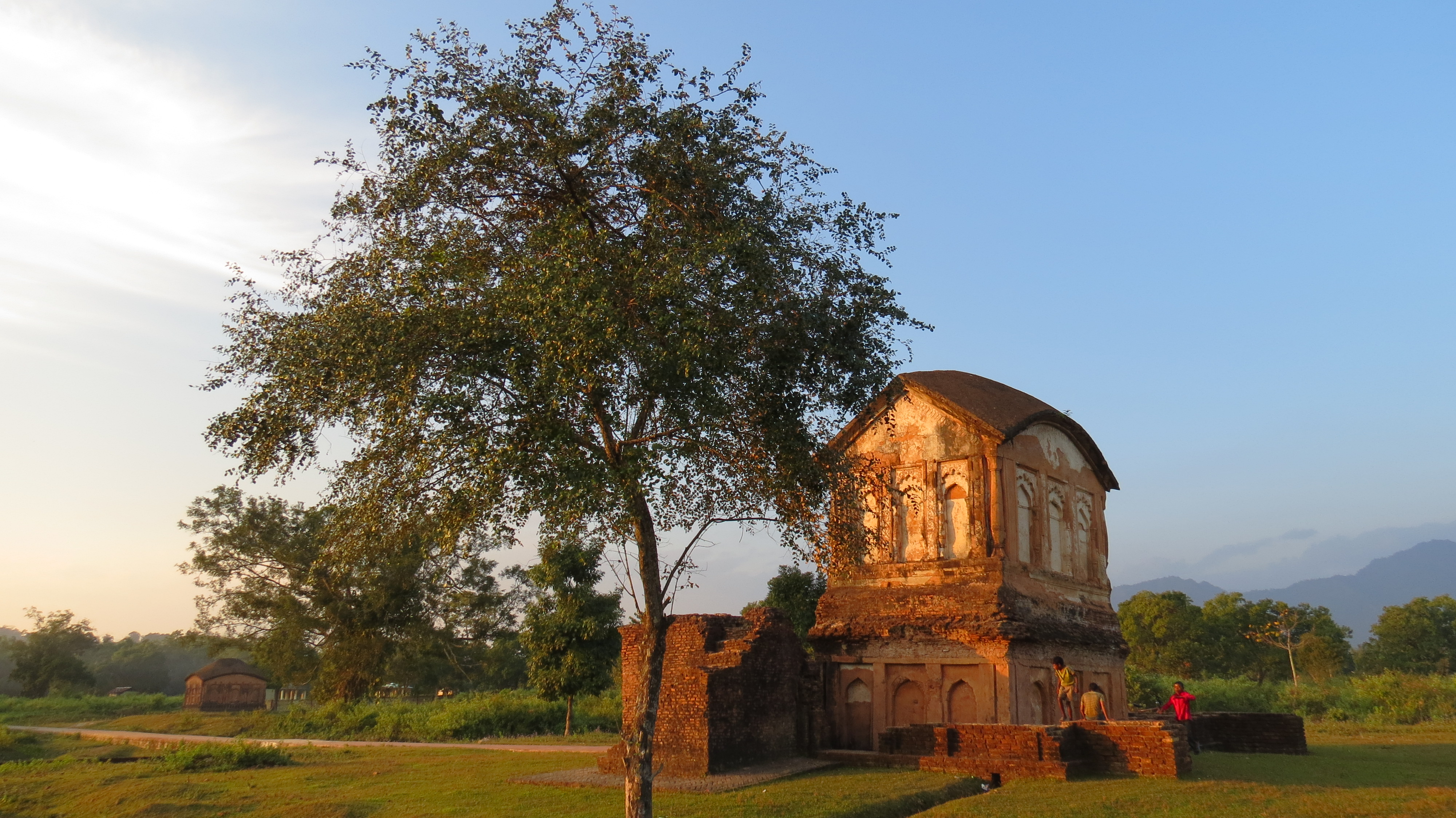
Ruins of Kachari kingdom

In the late medieval period, the elder prince of Dimasa Kachari, Drikpati, and a younger prince, Dakhin, had a conflict. Dakhin and his followers were driven out and built a new capital at the Barak Valley, declaring themselves as Dibrasa or the Children of the Barak River (Di means "River", and Brasa means "Barak"). The Dibrasa were later known as Twiprasa and formed the Twipra Kingdom in the Barak Valley.

In 1562, the Koch dynasty King Chilarai invaded and captured the Barak Valley from the Twipra Kingdom. King Chilarai gave his brother, Kamal Narayan, authority over the region. The descendants of Kamal Narayan ruled the region until the 18th century as Khaspur kingdom. Bhima Singha was the last Koch ruler of Khaspur. He had no sons, only a daughter named Kanchani. Kanchani married Laxmichandra, a prince from the Dimasa kingdom of Maibang. After the last Koch king Bhima Singha died, the Dimasas moved to Khaspur. This led to the merging of the two kingdoms, forming the Kachari kingdom under King Gopichandranarayan, and ruled most of the undivided Cachar district.

Raja Shri Krishna Chandra Dwaja Narayan Hasnu Kacharihe was the most powerful king of the Dimasa Kingdom at Khaspur. During Krishna Chandra's rule, the Manipuri king sought help against the Burmese army. Krishna Chandra defeated the Burmese in battle and was offered the Manipuri Princess Induprabha in thanks. Because Krishna Chandra was already married to Rani Chandraprabha, he asked Princess Induprabha to marry his younger brother, Govinda Chandra Hasnu. During this period, Khaspur was the capital of Cachar. The last king of Cachar was Raja Govindra Chandra Dwaja Narayana Hasnu.

=== British period ===
The British moved into Assam in 1824 during the First Anglo-Burmese War, which was then under Burmese occupation. At the time, the Cachar kingdom was ruled by two leaders—Raja Govindra Chandra Dwaja Narayana Hasnu in the southern plains, and Raja Tularam Thaosen in the North Cachar Hills (Dima Hasao). Raja Govinda Chandra was assassinated on 24 April 1840 at Haritikar. Because he died without a natural heir, his territories were annexed by the British under doctrine of lapse, adding it as the Cachar district of Assam.

The British sent army officer T. Fisher to oversee the region; he established its headquarters at Cherrapunji on 30 June 1830. Fisher was both the magistrate and the collector, later becoming the first Superintendent of the District. The British annexed Cachar plains on 14 August 1832. The district's headquarters moved to Dudpatil in 1833, and later to its current location of Silchar.

Northern Cachar remained a separate principality but came under British occupation in 1854 after the death of Tularam; the British justified this takeover of northern Cachar because of the "misconduct of its rulers." Cachar district became part of the Chief Commissionership of Assam on 6 February 1874.

In the later 19th century, southern Cachar was raided numerous times by the Lushais.

=== Partition ===
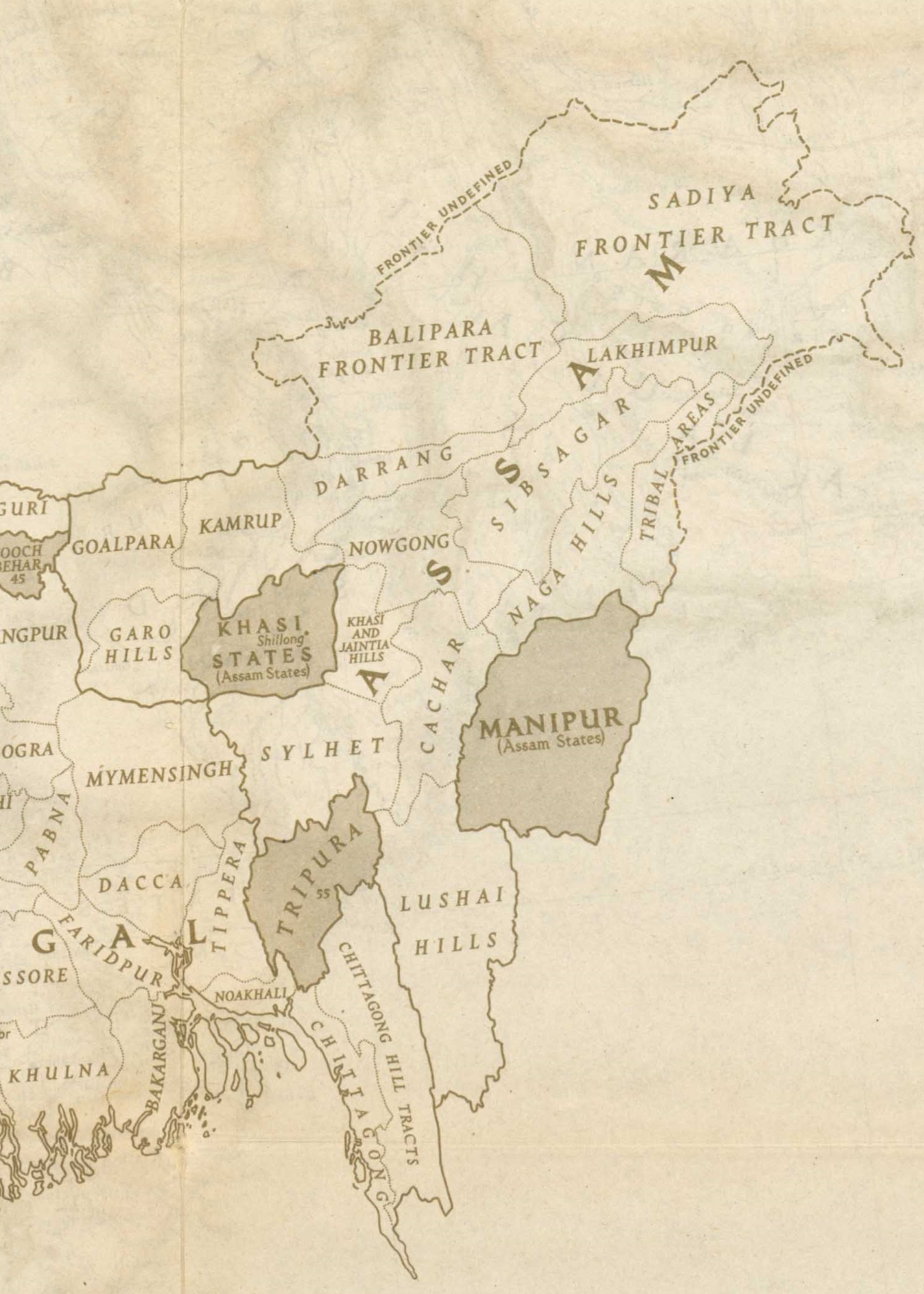
Cachar, Sylhet and Nowgong districts in British India, 1946

Cachar district in India, 1950

After partition of India in 1947, the Karimganj sub-division of undivided Sylhet District of British India became part of the Cachar district of India. Subsequently, internal district boundary altered as North Cachar was separated from Cachar as Dima Hasao district in 1963, followed by Karimganj district. Hailakandi district was formed from Cachar district in 1989.

== Geography ==
Cachar district occupies an area of 3,786 square kilometres (1,462 sq mi). The district is surrounded on the south by Mizoram, to the east by Manipur, to the west by Hailakandi district and Karimganj district, and to the north by the Barali and the Jayantia hill ranges. The Barak River is the main river of the district, along with its tributaries—the Jiri River and Jatinga River from the north, and the Sonai River and Daleswari River from the south. The district consists primarily of plains but also includes several ranges of hills throughout the district. At times, the wetlands of the plains flood, forming lakes. The district is mostly a tropical evergreen forest, with large tracts of rainforests in the north and south of the district.

=== Climate ===
The average annual rainfall of Cachar district is more than 3,000 millimetres (120 in). Its climate is tropical wet; the district has hot and wet summers and cool winters.

== Demographics ==
Historical population
Year	Pop.	±%
1901	301,884	—
1911	339,107	+12.3%
1921	359,376	+6.0%
1931	386,695	+7.6%
1941	437,284	+13.1%
1951	541,891	+23.9%
1961	664,351	+22.6%
1971	823,515	+24.0%
1991	1,215,385	+47.6%
2001	1,444,921	+18.9%
2011	1,736,617	+20.2%
Source: Census of India

=== Population ===
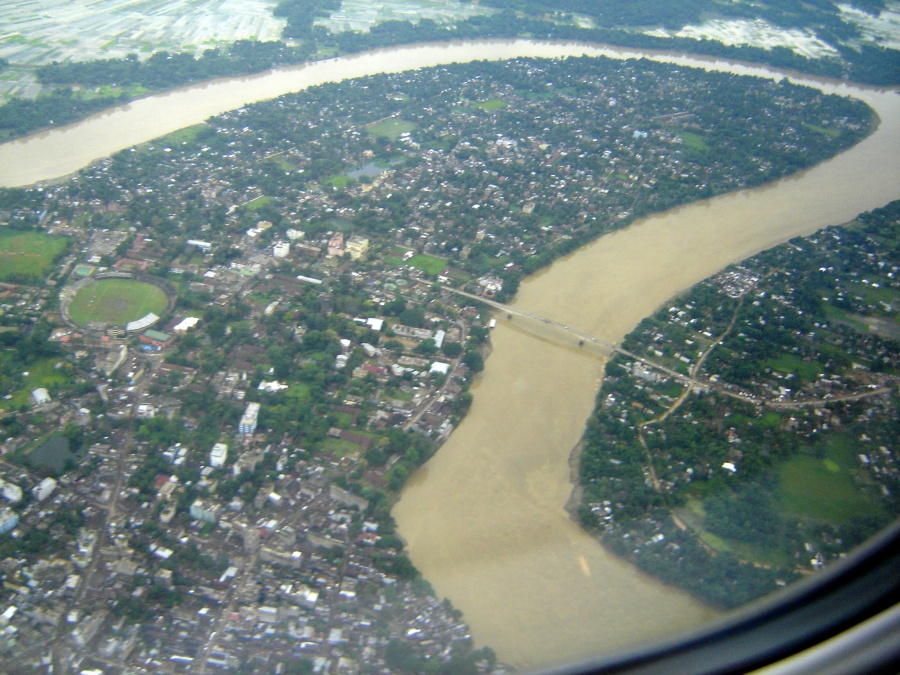
Aerial view of settlement around Sadarghat Bridge over the Barak River in Silchar

According to the 2011 census, Cachar district has a population of 1,736,617. It ranks 278th out of a total of 640 districts in India. The district has a population density of 459 inhabitants per square kilometre (1,190/sq mi). Its population growth rate over the decade of 2001 to 2011 was 20.17%. Cachar has a sex ratio of 958 females for every 1000 males, and a literacy rate of 80.36%. 18.17% of the population lives in urban areas. Scheduled Castes and Scheduled Tribes make up 15.25% and 1.01% of the population, respectively.

=== Religion ===
Hinduism is the main religion in Cachar, including 59.83% of the population. Christians are mainly found in tribal communities, and represent just 2.17% of the total population of the region. Among the Bengalis, Hinduism and Islam religions are equally represented, although Muslims are only 37.71% of the region's total population. Sikhism arrived in Cachar after Guru Nanak's visit to eastern India in 1508. In the early 20th century, most of the Sikhs lived in the northern part of Cachar where they worked for the Assam Bengal Railway.

Religions in Cachar district (2011)
Religion	Per cent
Hinduism	59.83%
Islam	37.71%
Christianity	2.17%
Other or not stated	0.29%

Population of circles by religion
Circle	Hindus (%)	Muslims (%)	Christians (%)	Others (%)
Katigorah	45.00	53.55	1.32	0.13
Silchar	72.19	26.42	1.00	0.39
Udarbond	70.45	26.05	3.13	0.37
Sonai	41.17	56.92	1.76	0.15
Lakhipur	61.04	32.71	5.87	0.38

=== Language ===
Languages in Cachar district (2011)
1. Bengali (75.1%)
2. Hindi (8.49%)
3. Meitei (6.06%)
4. Bhojpuri (3.32%)
5. Bishnupriya Manipuri (1.32%)
6. Dimasa (1.19%)
7. Others (4.49%)

Bengali and Meitei are the official languages of the Cachar district. According to the 2011 census, Bengali is spoken by 75% of the overall population. Although Bengali is the official language, the most common spoken language is Sylheti, often grouped with Bengali as a dialect. Bengalis are the majority ethnic community, but other ethnic groups also live in the district and speak Meitei, Bhojpuri, Bishnupuriya, Dimasa, Rongmei-Naga, Mizo, Khasi, etc. Immigrants from other parts of India are also present and are mainly Hindi speakers.

== Government ==
The district has three sub-divisions: Silchar, Lakhipur, and Katigorah. Silchar is the center of government. There are seven Assam Legislative Assembly constituencies in this district: Barkhola, Dholai, Katigorah, Lakhipur , Silchar, Sonai, and Udharbond. These seven constituencies make up the Silchar Lok Sabha constituency. Dholai is designated for scheduled castes, among the most disadvantaged socio-economic groups in India.

== Economy ==
Silchar is the district headquarters and is one of the most important business centers of Assam. Because of its wet climate, the main crops of the district are rice and tea.

The Indian government identified Cachar as one of the country's 250 most backward districts in 2006; there are 640 districts in India. It currently receives funding through the Backward Regions Grant Fund program (BRGF).

== Arts and culture ==
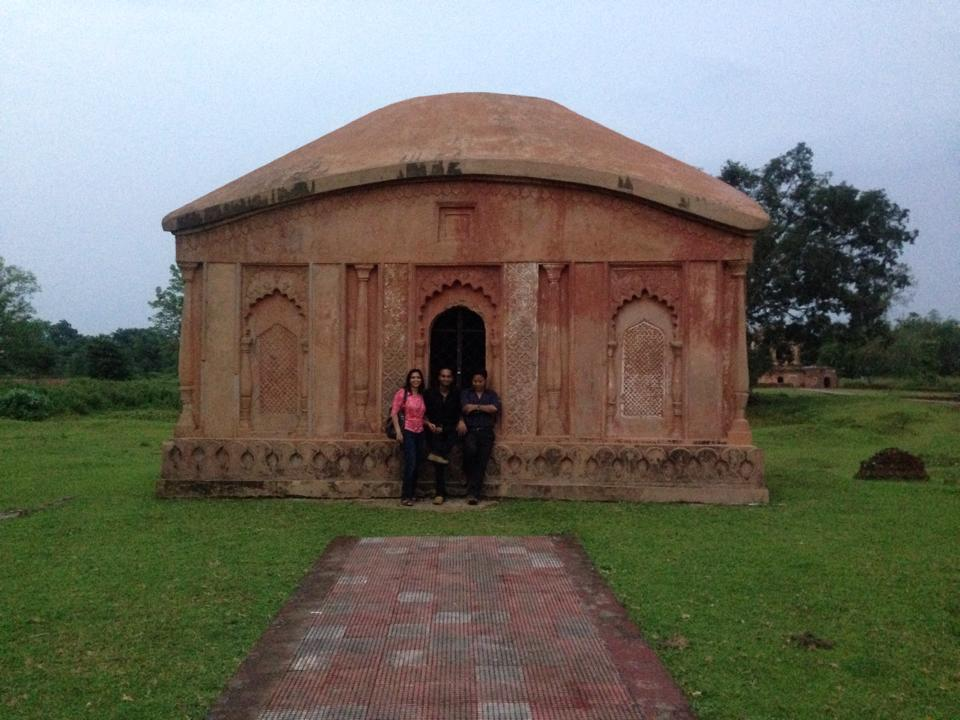
Bar Dwari, Silchar

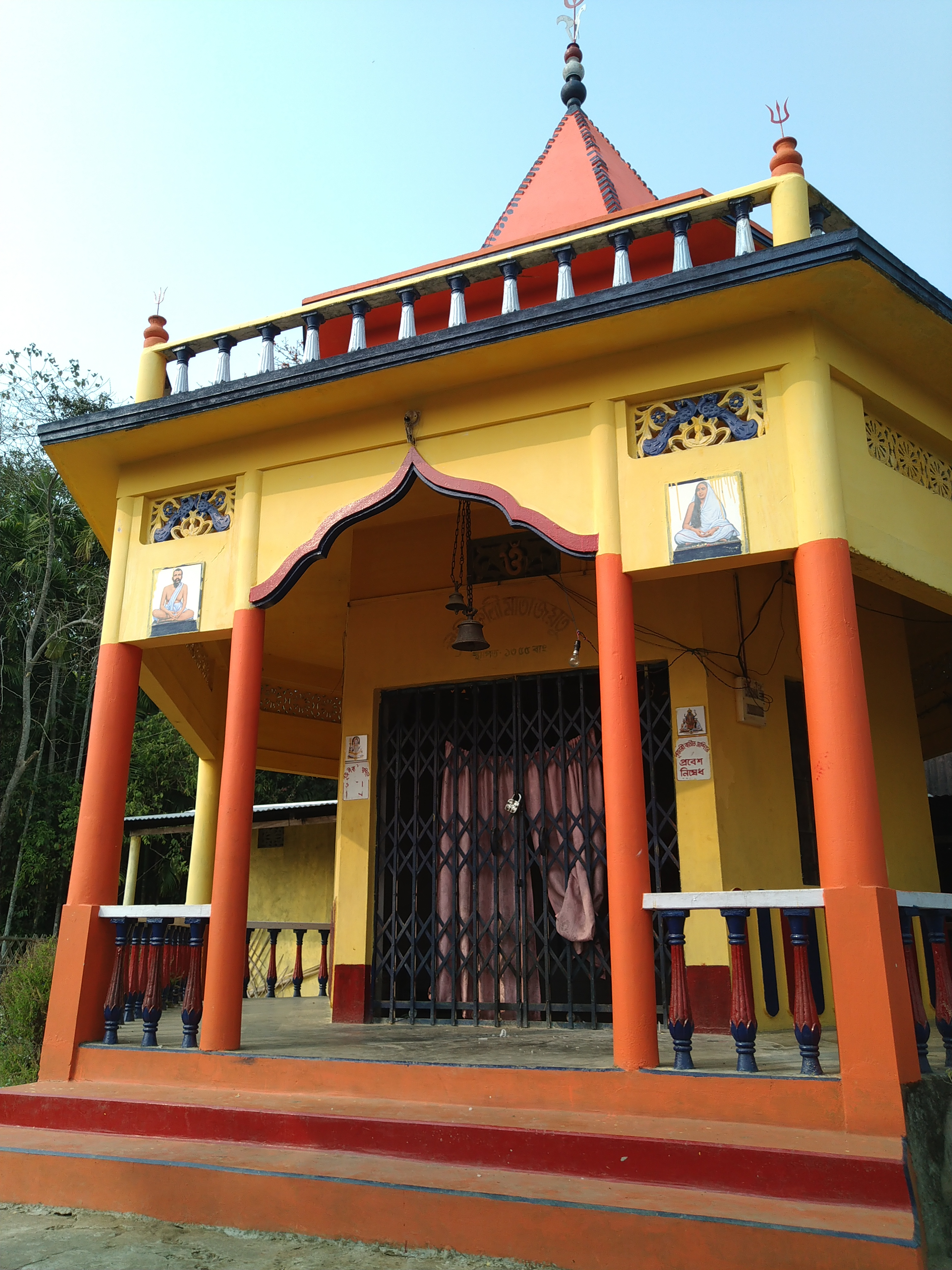
Kali temple of Sonai dungripar.

=== Architecture ===
There are several temples and historic sites in Silchar and Cachar. The village of Khaspur, 20 kilometres (12 mi) from Silchar, features the Sun Gate, Lion Gate, the king's palace, a temple, and other remains of the 17th century Kachari Kingdom. The ruins of Kachari Fort in Dimapur, Nagaland, date to the 13th century. The Baro Dwari, Bishnu Mandir, Kali Mandir, Singh Duwar, and Snan Ghar are other ancient monuments in the Cachar district. Other sites include Badarpur Fort in Badarpur, Bhubaneswar Shiva temple at Chandragiri in Sonai, Nrimata temple at Barkhola, and Siddeshwar temple in Badarpur.

=== Museums ===
Silchar has several museums, including Assam State Museum, the Digboi Centenary Museum, the Railway Heritage Park and Museum, and the Sonitpur District Museum.

=== Parks and recreation ===
Barail Wildlife Sanctuary is the only wildlife sanctuary in the district and was established in 2004. The naturalist Dr. Anwaruddin Choudhury worked to create the sanctuary in the early 1980s. Rare species in the sanctuary included the Hoolock gibbon, the phayre's leaf monkey, the pig-tailed macaque, the stump-tailed macaque, the masked finfoot, and the white-winged wood duck. The sanctuary is also home to tiger, the hoolock gibbon, and the gaur. The Asian elephant is already extinct. The southern part of the district was also recommended as a Dhaleswari wildlife sanctuary but has yet to receive that status.

== Transportation ==
Silchar has an airport, which is located at Kumbhirgram. It is served by regular flights from IndiGo, Air India, and SpiceJet. Broad-gauge railways connect the district to Guwahati in Assam and other parts of India including New Delhi, Kolkata and Chennai; from here, regular train service is provided to all cities in North-East India. Roads connect the district to the rest of the country. In addition, there is regular bus service to cities in North-East India.

== Education ==
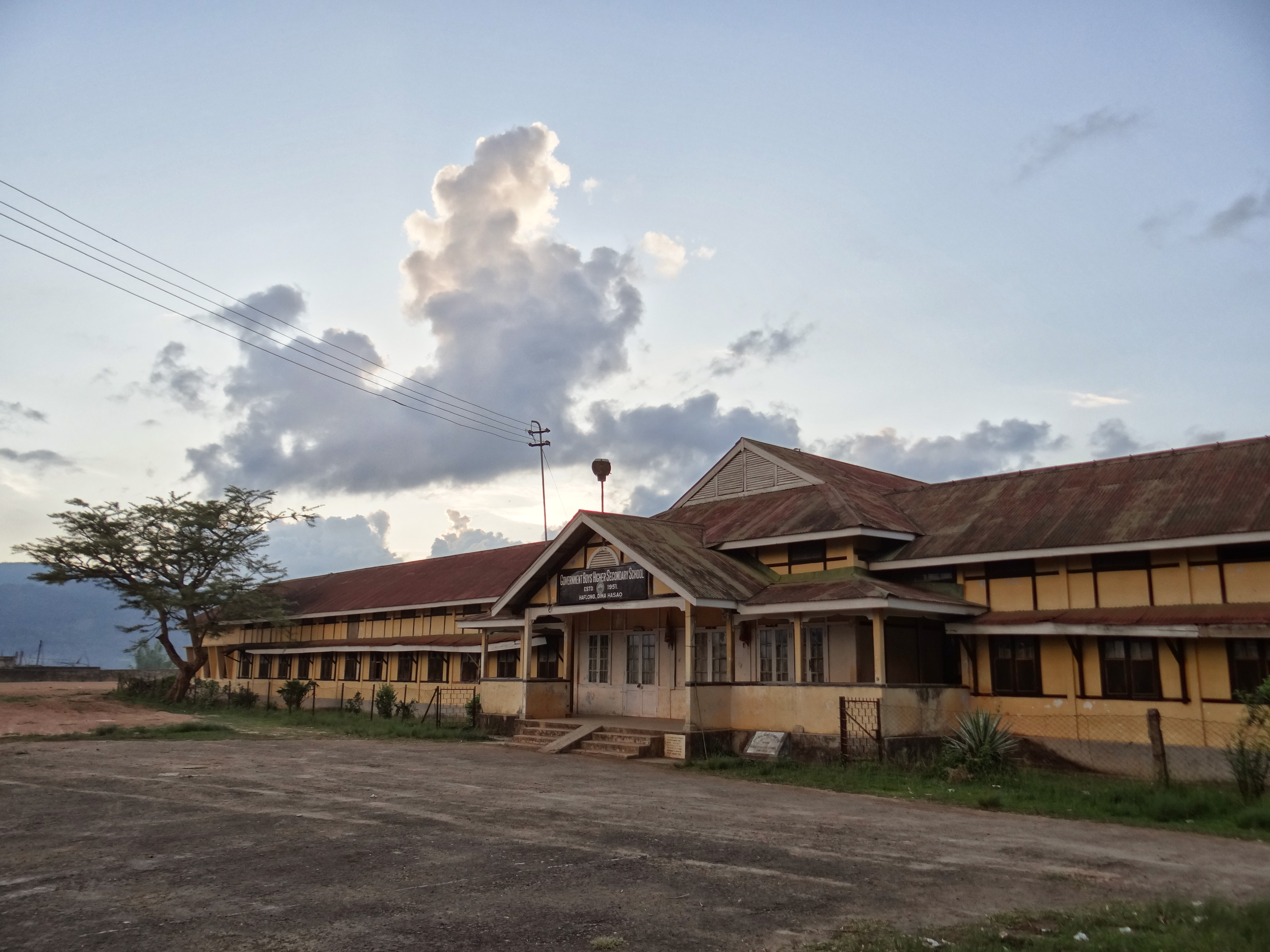
Government Boys School

Language Martyr's Memorial, Silchar railway station

Cachar district has several well-known educational institutions. Silchar is a major learning hub of Assam. The district has a central university, the Assam University, which is situated at Dorgakuna, 18 kilometres (11 mi) from Silchar. It also has National Institute of Technology, Silchar one of the thirty NITs in India. Silchar Medical College and Hospital is also located in Silchar and is the only medical college in southern Assam.

=== Colleges ===
The district includes ten degree colleges.

- Assam University
- Cachar College
- Jagannath Singh College, Udharbond
- Janata College, Kabuganj
- Madhab Chandra Das College, Sonai
- National Institute of Technology, Silchar
- Radhamadhab College
- Silchar Medical College and Hospital
- Women's College, Silchar
- Gurucharan College, Silchar

=== Schools ===
As of 2023, Cachar district includes 1,234 elementary schools and 158 secondary schools. Notable schools include:

- Jawahar Navodaya Vidyalaya, Pailapool
- Kendriya Vidyalayas
