= Cachar College =

Co-educational college in Silchar, Assam, India

Coordinates: 24.8316°N 92.7993°E

- Logo of Cachar College
- Motto: Tamaso Mā Jyotirgamaya
- Motto in English: Enlighten the souls from darkness
- Type: Public college
- Established: 20 June 1960; 66 years ago
- Affiliations: Assam University
- Chairman: Molleti Pushpa Raju
- Principal: Dr. Apratim Nag
- Location: Trunk Road, Silchar – 788001, Assam, Silchar, Assam, India
- Campus: Urban
- Website: www.cacharcollege.ac.in

Cachar College is a public co-educational college located in Silchar, Assam, India. Established on 20 June 1960, it is affiliated with Assam University and recognized by the University Grants Commission (UGC) under Sections 2(f) and 12(B) of the UGC Act, 1956. The college offers higher secondary and undergraduate programmes in the arts, commerce and science streams.

== Accreditation ==
Cachar College is recognized by the University Grants Commission (UGC) under Sections 2(f) and 12(B) of the UGC Act, 1956. The college has been accredited by the National Assessment and Accreditation Council (NAAC) with a 'B' grade.

== History ==
The idea of establishing a second institution of higher education in Silchar was discussed at a meeting held on 25 April 1960 at the Sramik Kalyan Office. Cachar College was subsequently established on 20 June 1960.

The college obtained permanent affiliation for the Pre-University Arts and Commerce streams from Gauhati University in 1961 and was shifted from the premises of Narsing Higher Secondary School to its present campus in the same year.

In 1966, the Government of Assam brought the college under the Deficit Grants-in-Aid system. The Science stream was introduced during the 1981–82 academic session and received government approval for Grants-in-Aid in 1990.

Following the establishment of Assam University in 1994, the college's degree programmes were transferred from Gauhati University to Assam University.

== Location ==
Cachar College is located on Trunk Road in Silchar, Assam. The college is situated about 1 km from Silchar railway station, around 20 km from Kumbhirgram Airport, and about 4 km from the Inter-State Bus Terminal (ISBT), Silchar.

== Campus ==
The college campus occupies approximately 5.3 acres (2.1 ha) of land and houses its academic and administrative facilities. A women's hostel is located within walking distance of the main campus.

== Academics ==
Cachar College offers higher secondary and undergraduate programmes in the arts, science and commerce streams. The higher secondary programmes are affiliated with the Assam Higher Secondary Education Council (AHSEC), while the undergraduate programmes are affiliated with Assam University. The college offers Bachelor of Arts (B.A.), Bachelor of Science (B.Sc.) and Bachelor of Commerce (B.Com.) degree programmes. In addition, it offers self-financed career-oriented courses.

The college has departments in Arabic, Bengali, Economics, English, Hindi, History, Manipuri, Philosophy, Political Science, Sanskrit, Botany, Chemistry, Mathematics, Physics, Statistics, Zoology and Commerce.

== Facilities ==
Cachar College maintains a central library with reading, reference and lending facilities, along with departmental libraries. The college also provides a girls' hostel, computer centre, canteen, health care unit and common rooms for students. In addition, the campus includes digital classrooms and facilities for distance and open learning through a study centre of Krishna Kanta Handiqui State Open University (KKHSOU).

== See also ==
- Department of Manipuri, Assam University
