= Assam University =

Indian university in Silchar, Assam

- Motto: प्रत्यबोधकृतिरुपपत्य
- Type: Public
- Established: 1994 (32 years ago)
- Accreditation: NAAC
- Academic affiliations: UGC; AIU; ACU
- Chancellor: ACM Arup Raha (Retd.)
- Vice-Chancellor: Rajive Mohan Pant
- Rector: Governor of Assam
- Visitor: President of India
- Location: Silchar, Assam, India; 24.684°N 92.751°E
- Campus: Rural
- Website: www.aus.ac.in

Assam University is a central public university located at Silchar, Assam, India. It was founded in the year 1994 by the provisions of an act enacted by the Parliament of India. Former Air Chief Marshal Arup Raha is the Chancellor, the Governor of Assam is the Chief Rector and the President of India is acting as the Visitor of the university. Professor Rajive Mohan Pant succeeded Professor Dilip Chandra Nath as the vice chancellor of the university. The university has sixteen schools which offer Humanities, Languages, Environmental Sciences, Information Sciences, Life Sciences, Physical Sciences, Social Sciences, Law, Technology and Management Studies. There are 42 departments under these sixteen schools. The five districts under the jurisdiction of Assam University have 73 undergraduate colleges as of 31 March 2020. Assam University is an institutional signatory to the Global Universities Network for Innovation (GUNI), Barcelona and United Nations Global Compact (UNGC) for its commitment to educational social responsibilities.

Assam University is the second Central University of Assam after Tezpur University. Both were established in 1994.

== History ==
The history of Assam University is the history of people's struggle in Barak Valley. It is one of the subsequent outcomes of the Bengali Language Movement in the southern part of Assam. The Shaheed Minar built near the front gate of the university commemorates the sacrifices of the martyrs during the historical language movement in 1961.

== Schools and departments ==
The major teaching schools of the university along with the departments under them are:

- Abanindranath Tagore School of Creative Arts and Communication Studies
  - Department of Mass Communication
  - Department of Visual Arts
  - Department of Performing Arts
- Albert Einstein School of Physical Science
  - Department of Chemistry
  - Department of Physics
  - Department of Mathematics
  - Department of Statistics
  - Department of Computer Science
- Aryabhatta School of Earth Sciences
  - Department of Earth Sciences
- Ashutosh Mukhopadhyay School of Education
  - Department of Educational Science
- Deshabandhu Chittaranjan School of Legal Studies
  - Department of Law
- E. P. Odam School of Environmental Sciences
  - Department of Ecology and Environmental Science
- Hargobind Khurana School of Life Sciences
  - Department of Life Science & Bioinformatics
  - Department of Biotechnology
  - Department of Microbiology
- Jadunath Sarkar School of Social Sciences
  - Department of Anthropology
  - Department of History
  - Department of Political Science
  - Department of Social Work
  - Department of Sociology
- Jawaharlal Nehru School of Management Studies
  - Department of Business Administration
  - Department of Hospitality and Tourism Management
- Mahatma Gandhi School of Economics and Commerce
  - Department of Commerce
  - Department of Economics
- Rabindranath Tagore School of Indian Languages and Cultural Studies
  - Department of Bengali
  - Department of Hindi
  - Department of Indian Comparative Literature
  - Department of Linguistics
  - Department of Manipuri
  - Department of Sanskrit
- Sarvepalli Radhakrishnan School of Philosophy
  - Department of Philosophy
- Shushrutu School of Medical and Paramedical Sciences
  - Department of Pharmaceutical Sciences
- Suniti Kumar Chattopadhyay School of English and Foreign Language Studies
  - Department of English
  - Department of Arabic
  - Department of French
  - Department of Linguistics
  - Department of Comparative Studies
  - Department of Urdu
- Swami Vivekananda School of Library Sciences
  - Department of Library & Information Science
- Triguna Sen School of Technology
  - Department of Agricultural Engineering
  - Department of Computer Science & Engineering
  - Department of Electronics & Communication Engineering
  - Department of Applied Science & Humanities
  - Department of Education

=== Department of Manipuri ===
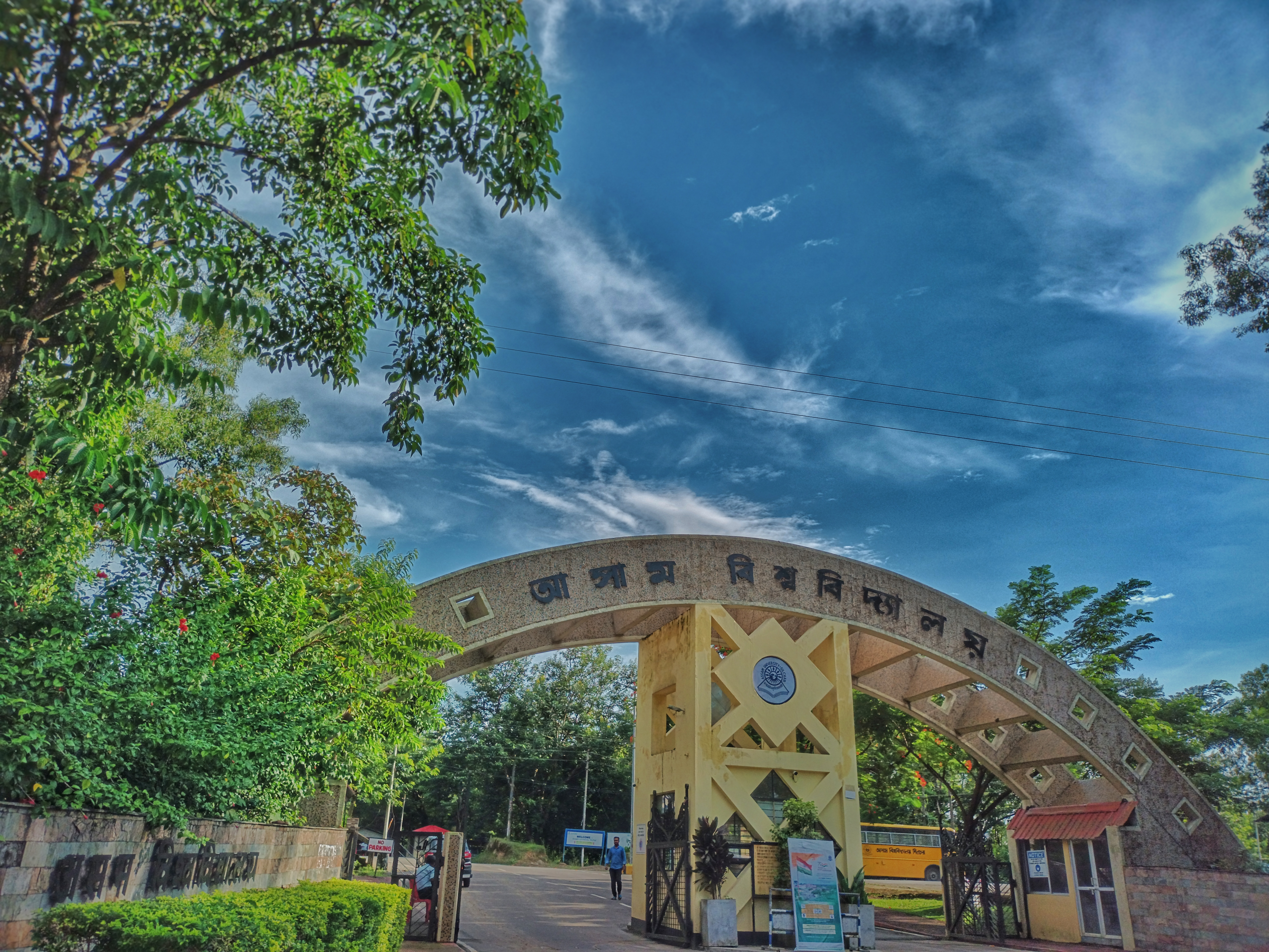
Entrance to the Assam University

Department of Manipuri, also known as Manipuri Department, is an educational department of studies in Meitei language (officially known as Manipuri language), in the university.

In November 1996, the University Grants Commission (U.G.C.) gave the approval of the creation of Department of Manipuri, simultaneously with those of Arabic, Social Work, Business Administration and Computer Science. The classes of these departments commenced on 15 July 1997 for the first time, for which the teachers of the subjects concerned were given appointment in March 1997, four months back.

The Reader and Head of the department is Saratchandrea Singh. Another notable reader is W. Raghumani Singh. Notable lecturers of the department of Manipuri are H. Nanikumar Singh and M. Rajendra Singh.

According to the department's own website, the department of Manipuri focuses on language, culture, folklore, literature and translation theories, offering the degrees of M.Sc. (by course work), M.A. (open course), M.Phil. (by course work and dissertation), Ph.D. (by course work and research work) and D.Litt (by research work). The department of Manipuri of Assam University has an allotment of 100 marks on Folklore in the syllabus of Master's degree of the Manipuri language paper. The colleges affiliated to the Assam University follow the same pattern of 100 marks, dedicated to folklore, in the Bachelor's degree. The mark allotment and the provision of paper for the academic study for Meitei folklore are similarly systematized in the Manipur University. The department of Manipuri of Assam University gives training programs for the students of Ph.D. degree for the specialisation in folklore, so as to uplift the importance of Meitei folklore.

The Department of Manipuri of the Assam University encompasses various departments of the same subject (Manipuri) in colleges affiliated to the Assam University, including but not limited to the Department of Manipuri, Cachar College, the Department of Manipuri, Gurucharan College, the Department of Manipuri, Lala Rural College, Hailakandi, the Department of Manipuri, Patharkandi College, the Department of Manipuri, Janata College, Kabuganj, etc.

== Campus ==
=== Main campus ===
The main campus has an area of 600 acres (2.4 km^{2}). The campus is situated 20 kilometres south of Silchar main city at Durgakuna, near Irongmara village. The university is located in a hilly area with greenery.

For accommodation, there are five hostels for girls and four hostels for boys available on the campus.

=== Diphu Campus ===
It has an area of 90 acres, about 9 km from Diphu, Karbi Anglong district of Assam.

== Transportation ==
The university provides bus service from the university campus to various places, including bus services from Silchar and Hailakandi to the university campus. There is also private transportation like auto-rickshaws.

== Ranking ==
University and college rankings

Assam University was ranked at 97 in the university and in the rank band 101-150 in the overall category by the National Institutional Ranking Framework in 2025.

== Affiliated colleges ==
All the colleges in the six districts of South Assam, viz, Cachar, Hailakandi, Karimganj, North Cachar Hills or Dima Hasao, Karbi Anglong district and West Karbi Anglong district fall within university's jurisdiction. Notable affiliated colleges include:

- A K Chanda Law College, Tarapur, Silchar
- Barkhola College, Silchar
- Cachar College, Silchar
- Diphu Government College, Diphu
- Diphu Law College, Diphu
- Dr S B Institution of Education, Hailakandi
- Eastern Karbi Anglong College, Sarihajan
- Haflong Government College
- Hailakandi Women's College, Hailakandi
- J N Singh College, Silchar
- Janata College, Cachar
- Kaliganj Pioneer College ( Karimganj)
- Kapili College, Donkamukam
- Karimganj College, Karimganj
- Karimganj Law College, Karimganj
- Katigorah A Degree College, Silchar
- Lala Rural College
- Madhab Chandra Das College, Sonai
- M H C Memorial Sc College, Hailakandi
- Nabinchandra College, Badarpur
- Nilambazar College, Nilambazar
- Patharkandi College of Education, Karimganj
- Katlicherra Model College, Hailakandi
- Hailakandi College, Hailakandi
- Rabindra Sadan Girls' College, Karimganj
- Ramanuj Gupta Junior and Degree College, Silchar
- Radhamadhab College, Silchar
- Ramkrishna Nagar College, Karimganj
- Rangsina College, Dongkamokam
- SC Dey College, Hailakandi
- SM Dev College, Lakhipur
- Thong Nokbe College, Dokmoka
- Srikishan Sarda College, Hailakandi.
- Vivekananda College of Education, Karimganj
- Women's College, Silchar
