= Silchar =

Silchar Shilchôr (Bengali)
- City
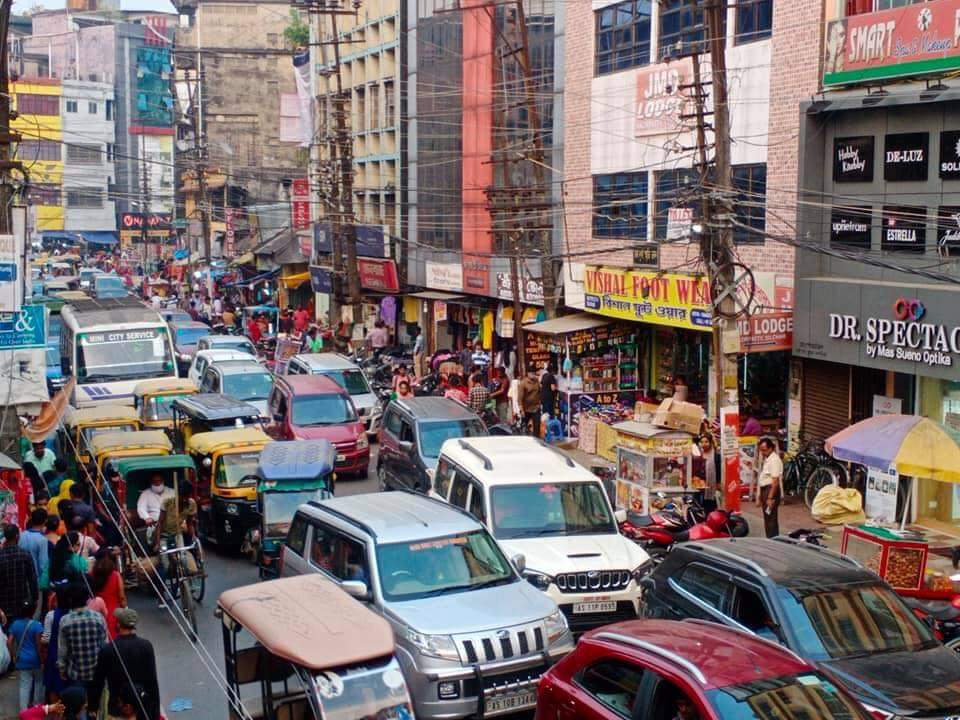
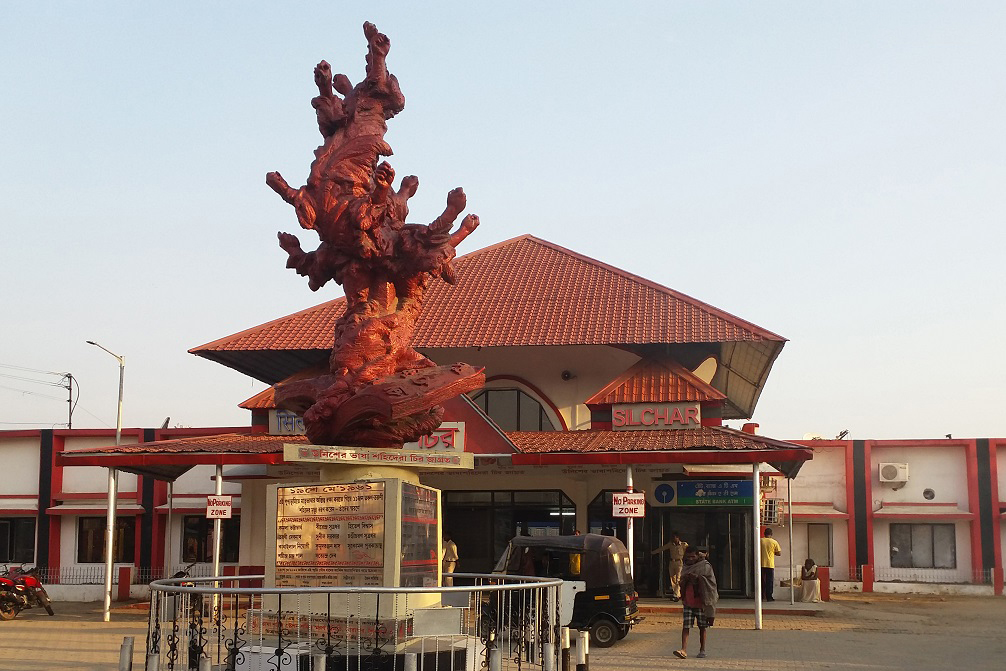
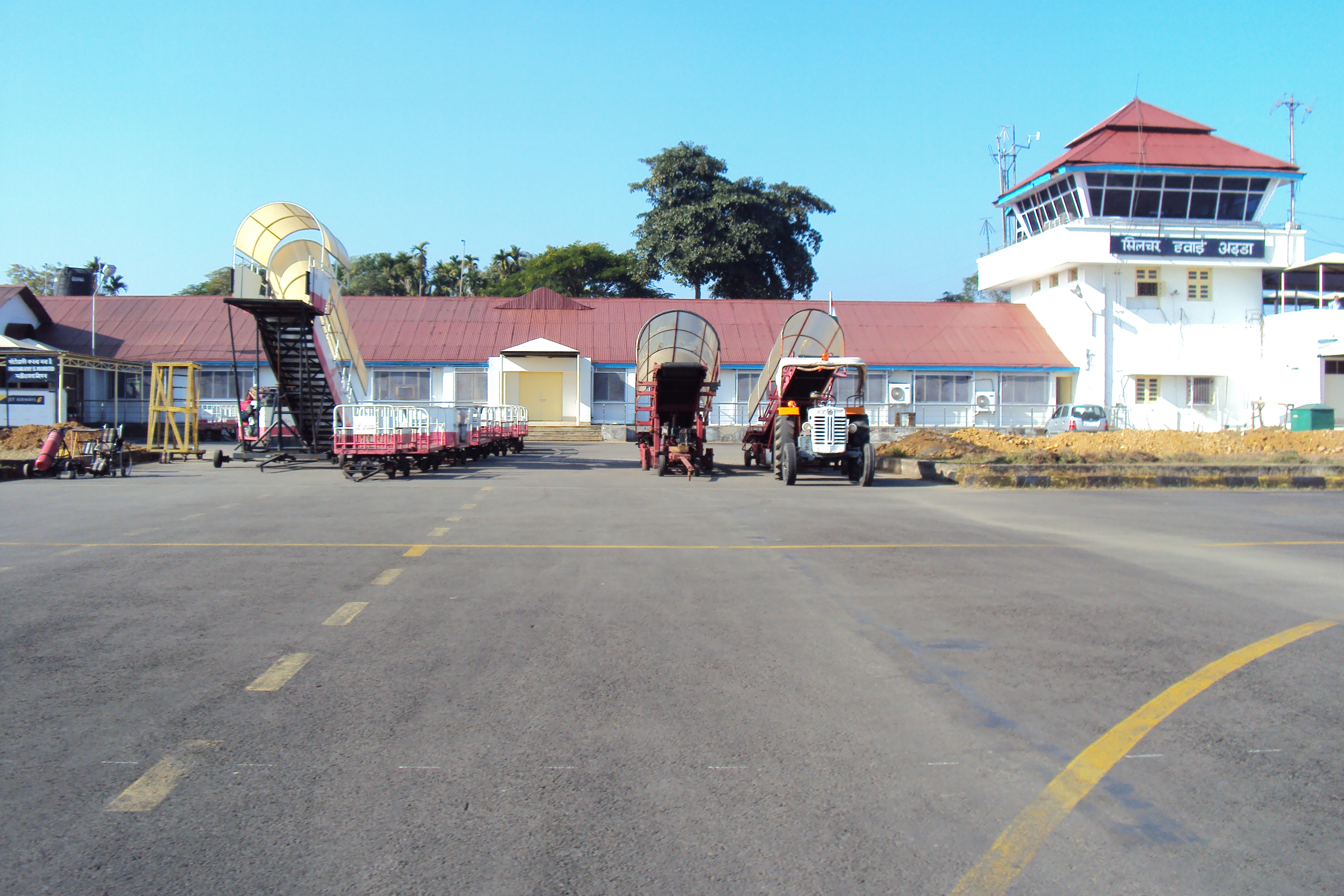
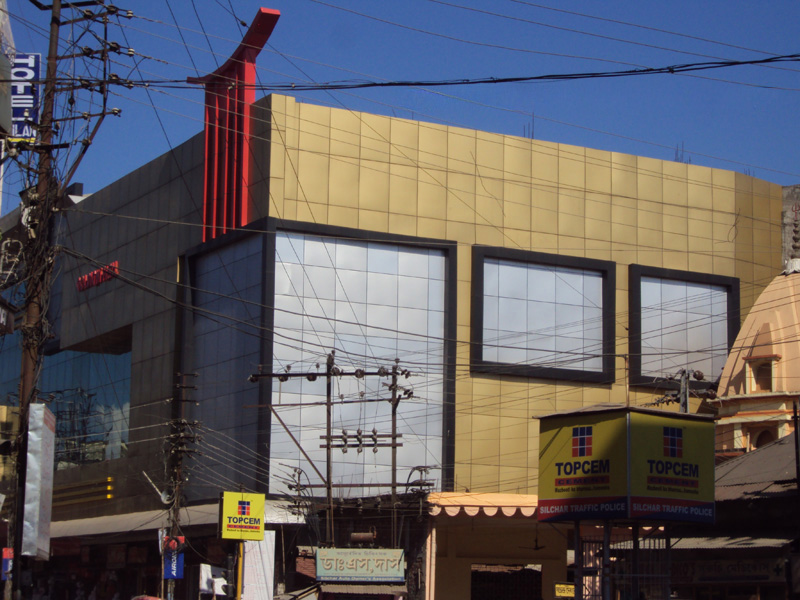
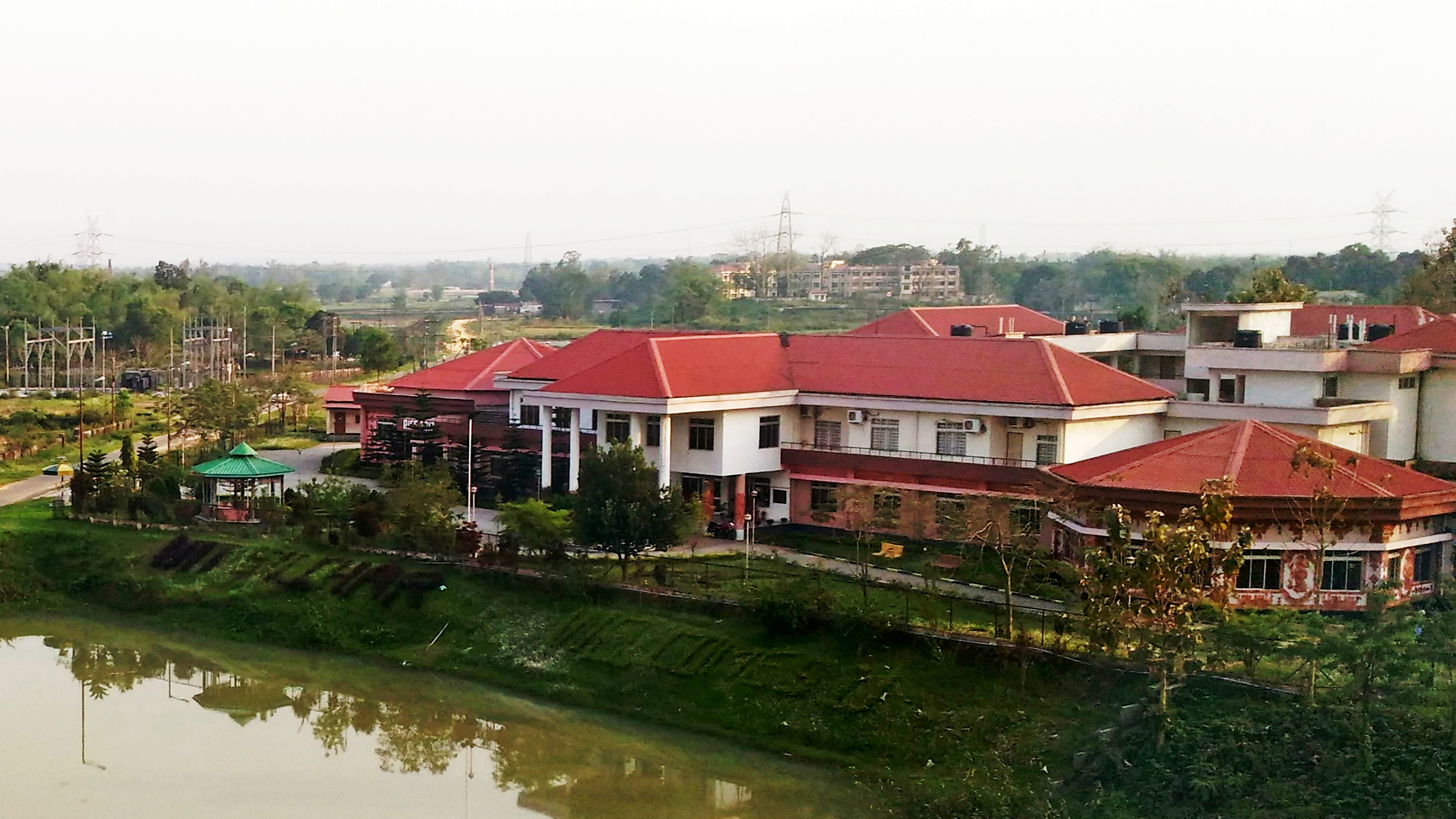
- Clockwise from top: Nazirpatty, Silchar city; Silchar Airport, NIT Silchar, Goldighi Mall, Silchar railway station
- Nicknames: The Island of Peace & The City of Love
- Location in Assam Silchar (India)
- Coordinates: 24.82°N 92.8°E
- Country: India
- State: Assam
- District: Cachar
- Region: Barak Valley
- No. Of Wards: 42
- Established: 1838

Government
  - Type: Municipal Corporation
  - Body: Silchar Municipal Corporation
  - Mayor: Niharendra Narayan Tagore, BJP
  - MLA: Rajdeep Roy, BJP
  - MP: Parimal Suklabaidya, BJP
  - Deputy Commissioner: Mridul Yadav, IAS

Area
  - City: 69.49 km^{2} (26.83 sq mi)
- Elevation: 22 m (72 ft)

Population (2011)
  - City: 172,830
  - Density: 8,524/km^{2} (22,080/sq mi)
  - Metro: 228,985
- Demonym: Silcharian
- Time zone: UTC+5:30 (IST)
- PIN: 788001-788032 & 788118
- Telephone code: +91 (0) 3842
- Vehicle registration: AS-11
- Sex Ratio: 943 ♀️/ 1000 ♂️
- Climate: Cwa
- Official language: Bengali
- Associate official language: Meitei (Manipuri)
- Literacy Rate: 91.05%
- Lok Sabha Constituency: Silchar
- Vidhan Sabha Constituency: Silchar
- Website: www.cachar.nic.in

Silchar is a city and the headquarters of the Cachar district of the state of Assam, India. It is second largest city of Assam after Guwahati in terms of population and GDP. It is located 343 kilometres (213 mi; 185 nmi) south east of Guwahati. It was founded by Captain Thomas Fisher in 1832 when he shifted the headquarters of Cachar to Janiganj in Silchar. It earned the moniker "Island of Peace" from Indira Gandhi, the then Prime Minister of India. Silchar is the site of the world's first polo club and the first competitive polo match. In 1985, an Air India flight from Kolkata to Silchar became the world's first all-women crew flight. Silchar was a tea town and Cachar club was the meeting point for tea planters.

== Etymology ==
The city was founded in Janiganj-Sadarghat area of the town near the Barak bank which was used as a river port. It is theorised that the locals started calling the area 'Shiler Chor' meaning the rocky shore, which got shortened to 'Silchar', which was in turn adopted and popularised by the British.

== History ==
=== Medieval History ===
Since Silchar was only founded after the introduction of the British in 1832, the pre-colonial history of Silchar can be approximated through the history of the region and nearby areas.

==== Tippera, Koch, and Dimasa rule ====
Cachar district, whose headquarters is in Silchar, was ruled by the Manikya dynasty in the 13th century. The initial capital of the kingdom was in Khalangsha in Cachar, which has been identified as Rajghat village in Sonai, 18 km from Silchar. The Tippera eventually moved eastwards to present day Tripura. By the 16th century, Cachar was a part of the Tripura kingdom.

The Tippera kings continued their rule in Barak Valley till mid-16th century, when commander Chilarai of the Koch dynasty defeated the king of Tripura in 1562 in Longai. Longai became the boundary between the Tripura and Koch kingdoms. Bir Chilarai, also known as Shukladhwaja, was the younger brother of the Koch king Nara Narayan. Gosai Kamal, also known as Kamal Narayan, was another brother of Naranarayan. He was made the governor of Barak Valley and ruled the area from Khaspur, 20 km away from Silchar.

Even after the collapse of the Koch kingdom elsewhere, the Koch continued ruling Cachar from Khaspur. The area was ruled by seven more Koch kings after Gosai Kamal: Udita Singha, Dhir Singha, Mehendra Singha, Ranjit Singha, Nara Singha and Bhim Singha. Bhim Singha, the last Koch Raja of Khaspur, only had a daughter called Kanchani who was married off to Prince Laksmichandra of the Kachari Dimasa kingdom of Maibang in 1745. Maibang is in present-day hill district of Dima Hasao, adjacent to Cachar. Laksmichandra was made the governor of a part of the kingdom which is still named after him - Lakhipur, situated 25 km away from Silchar. Laksmichandra became the Raja after Bhim Singha's death and eventually the two kingdoms were merged and present day Cachar came under Dimasa rule. Under the Dimasa kings, Cachar witnessed attacks from the Mughals, the Jaintias, the Manipuri kings, the Burmese, and the Ahoms.

==== Bengali presence in the Kachari Kingdom ====
While the hill areas of the Kachari kingdom i.e. Dima Hasao, had a Dimasa stronghold, the plain areas i.e. present day Cachar had Bengalis constituting the majority. While Bengalis had been inhabiting Cachar before the Koch rule, the Dimasa kings encouraged increased migration of Bengalis from nearby areas as priests, cultivators, and ministers at court. Eventually, the formal conversion of Dimasa kings into Hinduism was carried out under Bengali Brahmins when Raja Krishna Chandra and Raja Govinda Chandra performed the Hiranyagarbha ceremony in 1790.

The kings in turn were great patrons of Bengali literature; Bengali was the court language of the Kachari kings, translation of Sanskrit texts into Bengali was carried out, and the kings themselves composed prose and poetry in Bengali. In fact some of the only surviving written examples of the Bengali tradition in later 18th and early 19th century Cachar are the 27 letters written by Raja Krishna Chandra and Raja Gobinda Chandra to the East India Company.

=== Colonial History ===
==== Burmese Invasion and the Treaty of Badarpur ====
After taking over parts of the Brahmaputra Valley and Manipur by 1823, the Burmese made forays into Cachar as well. The then Governor General of India, Lord William Amherst, saw the British occupation of Cachar as essential towards guarding the nearby British held district of Sylhet from the Burmese. On 6 March 1824, Gobinda Chandra signed the Treaty of Badarpur with the British, who declared Cachar as a British protectorate and recognised Raja Gobinda Chandra as the ruler of Cachar.

The Burmese army attacked Cachar in 1824 and the British declared war on them. Eventually, the two armies clashed in the Burmese stronghold of Dudpatil, 15 km from Silchar and the British were able to drive the Burmese away to Manipur in 1825. The clash in Cachar was the start of the First Anglo-Burmese War, which ended with the Treaty of Yandabo, wherein the Kingdom of Ava agreed to stop attacking Cachar, amongst other areas. Gobinda Chandra was reinstated on the throne but had to pay an annual tribute of Rs.10,000 to the British as per the Treaty of Badarpur, which adversely affected the post-Burmese occupation Cachar's economy.

Gobinda Chandra was assassinated without any heir on 24 April 1830. Though Gambhir Singh of Manipur, who was suspected to be behind the assassination, laid claim on Cachar, it passed onto British hands as per the Treaty of Badarpur. Captain Thomas Fisher, an army officer took charge of Cachar on 30 June 1830 with the headquarters in Cherrapunji. On 14 August 1832 Cachar came under formal British occupation and in 1833 Silchar was made the headquarters. Cachar was part of the Bengal province from 1832 to 1874, when the district was transferred to the new Assam province.

==== Foundation of Silchar ====
There is no mention of any place called 'Silchar' before the annexation of Cachar. Its constituent areas such as Tarapur, Ambikapur, Kanakpur, and Rangpur have been mentioned as villages under Gobinda Chandra, but not 'Silchar'. The earliest mention of Silchar was in 1835 in a report by R.B. Pamberton, and since then it was mentioned in British official documents. Silchar was founded as the administrative headquarters of Cachar around the Janiganj-Sadarghat area of the town. After shifting the district headquarters to Silchar in 1832, Captain Fisher started building Sadar Station in Janiganj. Janiganj existed prior to the British as part of a taluk under the Mirasdars of Ambikapur before being taken over by Gobinda Chandra. In this respect, Captain Thomas Fisher was the founder of Silchar. The Sadar Station and the District Court are still located in and around present day Janiganj.

According to a theorist, Fisher's reasons for choosing Silchar as the administrative centre for Cachar included 'the strategic location of Silchar, its accessibility from Sylhet, availability of land and labour, approach routes to neighbouring hills and prospects of riverine commerce'. The establishment of the Sadar Station was followed by the construction of the treasury and a kutchery. A jail and a police outpost for the Sylhet Light Infantry was constructed in Fatak Bazar, while offices and residential quarters were made in Janiganj. Parts of Janiganj were also allotted to officers and traders.

John Edgars, the successor to Captain Fisher, added to the urban growth of the city. He prepared a blueprint for the planned development of Silchar, paved the roads, and supervised the construction of office buildings, residential quarters, circuit house and the Deputy Commissioner's office. The latter two still survive. Under him, the jail was shifted from Fatak Bazar to its present site, and traders from nearby areas in Bengal were encouraged to settle in the town. Communication facilities were strengthened with the steamer service between Silchar and Kolkata in 1850, the establishment of the Head Post Office in 1852, and the introduction of telegraph in 1861. While Tarapur, Malugram and Itkhola were part of the older settled areas, newer localities such as Central Road, Nazirpatty, Premtola, Tulapatty, and Narshingtola emerged.

==== Silchar under the British ====
Due to the initiatives of Captain Fisher, a medical centre was established in Silchar in 1835, which became a hospital in 1864. The tea industry in Cachar was growing by 1855, which lead to Silchar's emergence as a centre of trade and commerce. The town got its first English education institution in 1863 when Reverend Pyrse started the High Grammar School, which later became the Government Boys Higher Secondary School. In 1864, a charitable dispensary was set up, which later became the Civil Hospital. Silchar got its very first body for self governance In 1882, when a Town Committee was established under the Bengal Municipal Act, 1876. Keating Library, the first library in Silchar, was established in 1876 and was renamed to Arun Chanda Granthagar after Independence. The earliest newspaper in Cachar, called 'Silchar', appeared in 1883. In 1891, the town became a municipality and in 1899 the Assam-Bengal railways reached Silchar, providing easier access to the Port of Chittagong. Silchar was connected to Kolkata through steamers as well.

Silchar witnessed major flooding in June 1929 because of incessant rains and flooding of river Barak. N. G. A. Edgley, District and Sessions Judge of Sylhet and Cachar, was present in Silchar during the floods and supervised the relief activities till 19 June when the Commissioner and Deputy Commissioner returned from Shillong and Haflong, where they were stranded. Buildings in the town sustained major damages and the supply of filtered water was absent from 12 June to 5 July.

By 1934, Silchar town had grown because of good connectivity through road, river, and rail. The population in the town had grown by 60% since 1901 and had access to water supply. The town now had increased amenities, including 'presses, motor works, druggist shop, oil mills, ice factory'. This led to the increase in revenue rates in 1934 by the then Deputy Commissioner P.C. Chatterjee. 1935 saw the establishment of G.C. College as the Guardian College. In 1937, the Cachar Branch of the Kishan Sabha was established with Dwijen Sen as first General Secretary. In 1940, a conference of the Sabha was organised in Silchar to demand better conditions for farmers. The Tebhaga movement of Bengal was organised in Cachar district as well by the Sabha where the local peasants participated. In 1942, the Japanese forces dropped a bomb on Derby Tea Estate 20 km from the town and the Second World War led to the shortage of water, electricity, paper, wood, kerosene. and clothes. Cycle rickshaws were introduced in Silchar the same year.

==== Silchar Polo Club ====
In the 1850s, the British observed exiled Manipuri princes in Silchar play Sagol Kangjei, the predecessor to modern polo which was already popular in nearby Manipur. Captain Robert Stewart, then assistant deputy commissioner, participated in the game with the Manipuri players. In 1859, Stewart, now the deputy commissioner, and Major General Joseph Sherer, assistant deputy commissioner, established the world's first polo club in Silchar, called the Silchar Kangjei Club. It was later renamed to Silchar Polo Club and survives today as the Cachar Club, though no polo is played any more. The first competitive modern form of polo was played in Silchar as well, and the plaque for this feat still stands behind the local District Library.

=== Post independence history ===
After the 1947 Sylhet referendum and Independence of India, the town of Silchar saw a large increase of 10.5% in its population in the decade of 1941–51. This was largely because of the in migration of Hindu refugees from the adjacent district of Sylhet went to East Pakistan. The effect of the partition was felt administratively as well. The Sessions Court of Sylhet had a Circuit Court present in Silchar till Independence. After that, Silchar and the rest of Cachar came under the District & Sessions Judge, Jorhat till 1955 when the District & Sessions Judge of Cachar District took over in Silchar. S. K. Dutta became the first District & Sessions Judge of Cachar District Judiciary.

Apart from the refugees from East Pakistan, Silchar also saw a lot of migration from neighbouring states in the Northeast due to political disturbances which added to the population growth. The 1971 Bangladesh Liberation War saw more in migration from then East Pakistan.

==== Language movement in Barak Valley ====
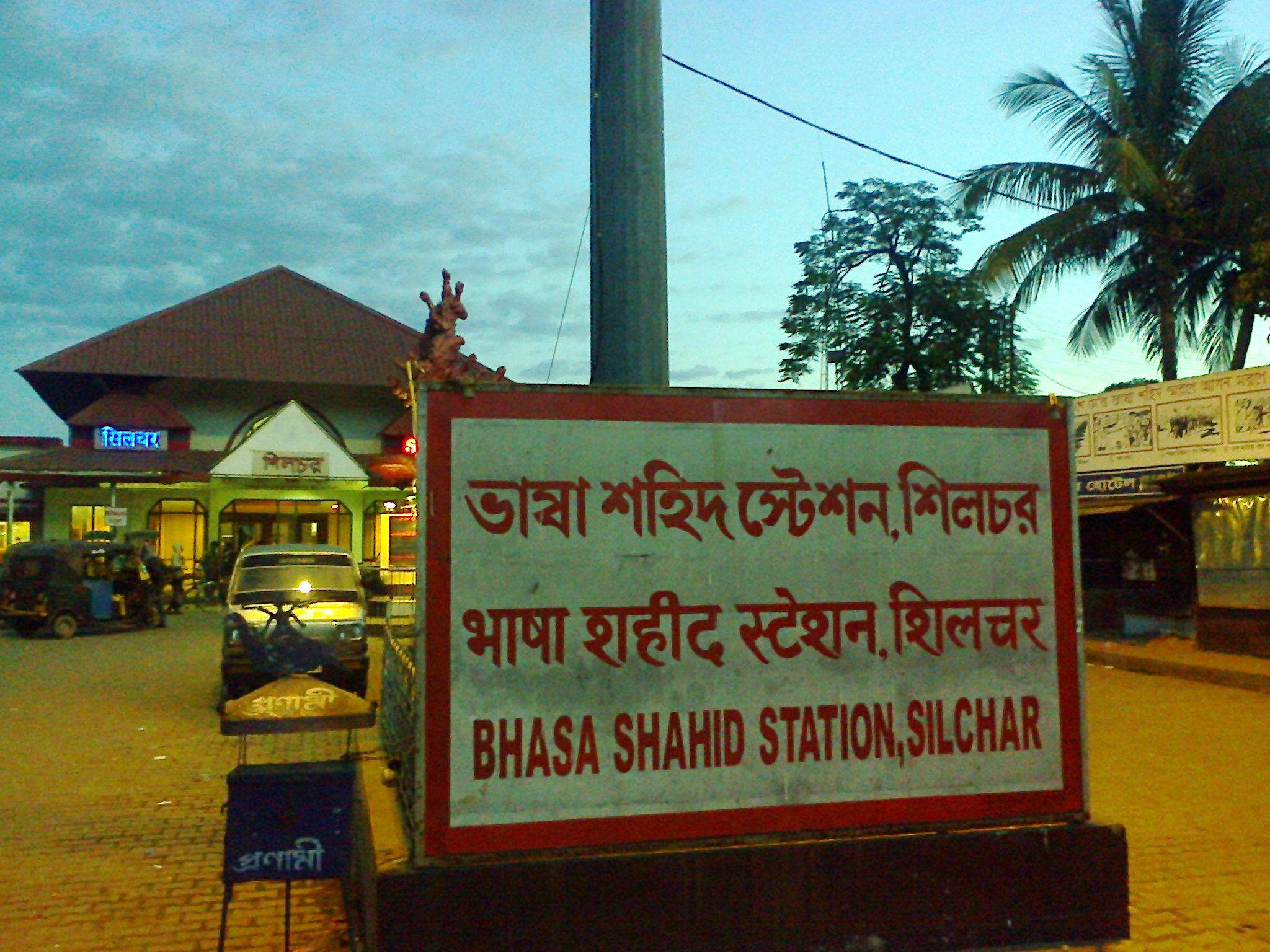
Silchar Railway Station is popularly known as Bhasa Shahid Station.

Silchar saw one of the uprisings in favour of the Bengali language. When the Assam government, under Chief Minister Bimala Prasad Chaliha, passed a circular to make Assamese mandatory, the Bengalis of Barak Valley protested. On 19 May 1961, Assam police opened fire on unarmed protesters at Silchar railway station. Eleven people (listed below) were killed.

- Kanailal Niyogi
- Chandicharan Sutradhar
- Hitesh Biswas
- Satyendra Deb
- Kumud Ranjan Das
- Sunil Sarkar
- Tarani Debnath
- Sachindra Chandra Pal
- Birendra Sutradhar
- Sukamal Purakayastha
- Kamala Bhattacharya

After the revolt, the Assam government withdrew the circular and Bengali was ultimately given official status in the three districts of Barak Valley. Section 5 of Assam Act XVIII, 1961, safeguards the use of Bengali in the Cachar district. It says, “Without prejudice to the provisions contained in Section 3, the Bengali language shall be used for administrative and other official purposes up to and including district level.”

== Geography ==
Silchar is located in the southernmost part of Assam. It is located between longitudes 92º24' E and 93º15' E and latitudes 24º22'N and 25º8'N East and is 35 meters above mean sea level. The city is located in an alluvial flat plain with swamps, streams, and isolated small hills (locally known as tilla) marking its landscape. Apart from Barak river, the other major river is Ghagra river.

Silchar is in Zone V on the Seismic Zonation Map and has witnessed major earthquakes. The earthquake in January 1869 was of magnitude of 7.5 on the Richter scale and caused heavy damage. Other significant earthquakes include those in 1947 (magnitude 7.7), 1957 (7.0) and 1984 (6.0).

=== Climate ===
Silchar has a borderline tropical monsoon climate (Köppen Am) slightly too hot in the "winter" or "cool" season to qualify as a humid subtropical climate (Cwa). During this "cool" season the weather is generally warm and dry with cool to mild mornings; however, the "wet" season begins early as the monsoon moves into the region during April, with the result that for seven months of the year Silchar has very hot and humid weather with heavy thunderstorms almost every afternoon until the middle of October, when there is usually a brief period of hot and relatively dry weather before the "cool" season sets in during November.

Climate data for Silchar (1991–2020, extremes 1901–present)
Month	Jan	Feb	Mar	Apr	May	Jun	Jul	Aug	Sep	Oct	Nov	Dec	Year
Record high °C (°F)	31.0 (87.8)	35.0 (95.0)	39.3 (102.7)	39.4 (102.9)	40.0 (104.0)	39.2 (102.6)	39.8 (103.6)	39.1 (102.4)	39.2 (102.6)	38.0 (100.4)	35.0 (95.0)	31.7 (89.1)	40.0 (104.0)
Mean daily maximum °C (°F)	25.2 (77.4)	27.7 (81.9)	31.0 (87.8)	31.6 (88.9)	31.8 (89.2)	32.3 (90.1)	32.8 (91.0)	33.0 (91.4)	32.8 (91.0)	31.9 (89.4)	29.6 (85.3)	26.6 (79.9)	30.5 (86.9)
Daily mean °C (°F)	18.9 (66.0)	21.3 (70.3)	24.7 (76.5)	26.6 (79.9)	27.7 (81.9)	28.7 (83.7)	29.2 (84.6)	29.3 (84.7)	29.1 (84.4)	27.5 (81.5)	24.0 (75.2)	20.2 (68.4)	25.6 (78.1)
Mean daily minimum °C (°F)	12.3 (54.1)	14.2 (57.6)	18.1 (64.6)	21.2 (70.2)	23.2 (73.8)	25.0 (77.0)	25.5 (77.9)	25.6 (78.1)	25.1 (77.2)	23.2 (73.8)	18.4 (65.1)	14.0 (57.2)	20.5 (68.9)
Record low °C (°F)	5.6 (42.1)	5.0 (41.0)	8.3 (46.9)	13.2 (55.8)	15.6 (60.1)	19.3 (66.7)	19.0 (66.2)	19.4 (66.9)	16.8 (62.2)	14.4 (57.9)	10.6 (51.1)	6.1 (43.0)	5.0 (41.0)
Average rainfall mm (inches)	6.9 (0.27)	46.8 (1.84)	164.0 (6.46)	299.1 (11.78)	452.6 (17.82)	544.5 (21.44)	489.2 (19.26)	428.3 (16.86)	379.5 (14.94)	187.5 (7.38)	28.7 (1.13)	12.6 (0.50)	3,039.7 (119.67)
Average rainy days	0.7	2.5	6.6	13.3	17.7	21.0	22.1	18.7	15.6	7.5	1.9	0.7	128.4
Average relative humidity (%) (at 17:30 IST)	70	62	60	71	77	82	82	80	81	80	77	74	75
Source 1: India Meteorological Department
Source 2: Tokyo Climate Center (mean temperatures 1991–2020)

Silchar has been ranked 30th best "National Clean Air City" under (Category 3 population under 3 lakhs cities) in India.

== Demographics ==
According to 2011 India census, Silchar municipal area has a population of 172,830. The sex ratio of Silchar is 989 females per 1,000 males, which is above the national ratio of 940 females per 1,000 males. Silchar municipal area has an average literacy rate of 82.33%, higher than the national average of 74.04%, with male literacy at 84.15% and female literacy at 80.49%.

The Silchar Urban Agglomeration had a total population of 228,985, of which 115,443 were males and 113,542 were females, with a literacy rate of 91.05%, with male literacy at 93.63% and female literacy at 88.44%.

=== Religion ===
Religion in Silchar City (2011)
1. Hinduism (86.3%)
2. Islam (12.2%)
3. Jainism (0.79%)
4. Christianity (0.59%)
5. Sikhism (0.04%)
6. Buddhism (0.02%)
7. Not stated (0.08%)

Hinduism is the majority religion in Silchar city with around 154,381 followers. Islam is the second most popular religion in Silchar with approximately 21,759 followers. Jainism is practised by 1,408 people, Christianity by 1,052 people, Sikhism by 77 people and Buddhism by 39 people in Silchar city. Around 145 people did not state their religion.

=== Languages ===
Languages spoken in Silchar city (2011)
1. Bengali (91.8%)
2. Hindi (5.36%)
3. Manipuri (2.05%)
4. Bishnupriya Manipuri (0.72%)
5. Others (0.10%)

Bengali and Meitei (Manipuri) are the official languages of this place.

According to 2011 census, Silchar city having a population of 172,830 persons, of which Bengali is spoken by 158,606 people, Hindi is spoken by 9,263 people, Manipuri is spoken by 3,543 people, Bishnupriya Manipuri is spoken by 1,244 people, while Others constitute 0.1% of the city's population according to 2011 census.

== Politics ==
Silchar is part of the Lok Sabha and Vidhan Sabha constituencies. The current member of Parliament from Silchar is Parimal Suklabaidya of the BJP and current MLA is Rajdeep Roy of the BJP.

=== Civic administration ===
Silchar Municipal Corporation is responsible for the municipal governance of the city. The municipal history of Silchar goes back to 1865 when the town was made a municipality under the Bengal District Town Improvement Act, 1864. The municipality was composed to 8 European and 3 Indian members, in addition to the chairperson and the vice-chairperson. This was later withdrawn in 1868. In January 1882, Silchar got a Town Committee under the Bengal Municipal Act, 1876. Mr. Wright, the Deputy Commissioner, was the chairperson and Babu Jagat Bandhu Nag was elected by the committee members as the vice-chairperson. Silchar had been divided into four wards - Janiganj, Ambicapur, Tarapur, and Malugram - but each ward had only 20-50 voters.

The Town Committee had limited powers to impose taxes, which constrained its funds and municipal activities. Yet it carried out some important activities: road construction, creating tanks and cleaning older ones, making public latrines, removable of 'objectional' houses such as distillery and slaughter houses out the town, and draining of swamps to prevent diseases. In 1891, on recommendation of the Deputy Commissioner to the Assam Government, Silchar was turned into a municipality. The first Municipal elections in Silchar were held in February 1900 but only 14.6% of the town was eligible to vote. 12 members were elected, who joined 2 ex-officio members and 6 nominated members to form the municipality. Of these 20 members, 16 were Indians and 4 were Europeans.

From 1882 to 1912, the Deputy commissioners were the chairpersons of the municipality. The chairpersons began to be elected from 1913 onwards. Kamini Kumar Chanda and Mahesh Chandra Dutta were the first elected chairperson and vice-chairperson of the Silchar municipality. The municipality took decisions like construction and repair of roads, buying medicines and taking public health preventive steps, sanitation, and setting prices to guard again inflation. As the pro-Independence sentiments grew, the municipality started to participate as well; reception plans for the Viceroy Chelmsford's visit to Silchar in 1919 were cancelled because of the Jallianwala Bagh massacre, a resolution was passed after the death of Chittaranjan Das in 1925, and members of the municipality proposed a hartal to protest against the Simon Commission's visit to India in 1928. In 1930, the then chairperson Dhirendra Kumar Gupta and member Satindra Mohan Deb were arrested because of their participation in the Civil Disobedience Movement. The municipality took out a resolution in July 1947 against including Cachar within Pakistan and sent a member to Kolkata to submit a memorandum in front of the Boundary Commission.

By 1952, when the first post Independence municipal elections took place, Madhurban was added to the ward list and the town now had 5 wards in total. This period also saw the municipality giving over the control of the fire brigade to the state government, and donation of land to establish educational institutes.

The area under the Silchar Municipal Board was 10 km^{2} in 1971 and 15.75 km^{2} in 1971.

Till 1975, the municipality had elected members, but from 1975 to 1979, a government Executive Officer was in charge. 1975 to 1984 saw an elected body preside over the municipal board, but from 1984, it has been run by state government appointees.

== Industries ==
- ONGC has its base located at Srikona, near Silchar, which is known as Cachar Forward Base with ongoing operations in Tripura, Mizoram and Barak Valley.
- Cachar Paper Mill (CPM) is the only major industrial undertaking in south Assam and the adjoining states of Mizoram, Meghalaya and Tripura. Despite a lack of infrastructure, CPM has a continuous record of improvement in production. During the year 2006–07, the mill recorded the highest annual production of 103,155 metric tonnes, registering 103% capacity utilisation, which was 100% during the previous year.
- Silchar is a cluster centre for cane and bamboo artisans.

== Transport ==
=== Air transport ===
Silchar Airport (IXS) is located at Kumbhirgram, about 22 km from Silchar. It was built during World war II and the current ATC services are provided by Indian Air Force. Silchar has been selected as one of the towns for the construction of 51 low-cost airports across the country. Silchar Airport is the 2nd busiest airport (70 civilian flights/week) in Assam and 4th busiest in North east after Guwahati, Agartala and Imphal and handles approximately 200,000 PAX yearly.

In December 1985, Air India operated the first all-woman crew flight in the world from Kolkata to Silchar which was commanded by Captain Saudamini Deshmukh on a Fokker F-27 Friendship aircraft. ISBT - SILCHAR ISBT from where Bus are runs every day for Guwahati, Shillong, Agartala, Siliguri, Imphal.

=== Road ===
- Shillong–Silchar High-Speed Corridor - connected to Shillong: 166.8 km (103.6 mi) from Mawlyngkhung near Shillong to Panchgram on NH-6 near Silchar, will cut travel time between the two cities from 8.5 hours to 5 hours and act as a continuation of Kaladan Multi-Modal Transit Transport Project offering a new Rs 22,864 crore high-speed highway between the North-East and Kolkata bypassing Bangladesh, executed by the National Highways and Infrastructure Development Corporation Limited (NHIDCL) and expected to be completed by 2030. Also there is an Inter State Bus Terminus in the outskirt of the city commonly known as (SILCHAR ISBT) from where Bus are runs every day for Guwahati, Shillong, Agartala, Siliguri, Imphal

== Education ==
Silchar is home to the main campus of Assam University, a central university that imparts education in both the general and the professional streams. The university, which came into existence in 1994, has 17 schools and 35 post graduate departments. It has 56 colleges affiliated to it. All the colleges in Silchar city are affiliated to the Assam University. Apart from the university, Silchar also has multiple colleges; G.C. College established in 1935, Cachar College, A.K.Chanda Law College, Teacher's Training College established in 1960, Women's College in 1963, Silchar Medical College in 1968, National Institute of Technology (Regional Engineering College) in 1969, and Radha Madhab College in 1971.

=== Technical institutions ===
- National Institute of Technology, Silchar

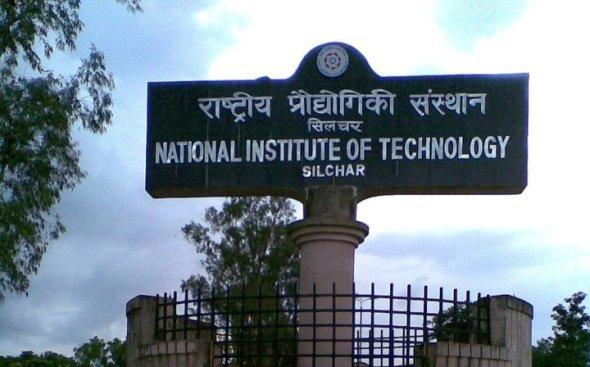
National Institute of Technology Silchar

- Triguna Sen School of Technology, Assam University, Silchar
- Silchar Polytechnic
- National Institute For Automotive Inspection Maintenance & Training (NIAIMT)

=== Colleges ===
- Gurucharan College
- Cachar College
- Women's College, Silchar
- Radhamadhab College
- Silchar College
- Lalit Jain Commerce College

=== Medical college ===
- Silchar Medical College and Hospital, established in 1968, serves the southern region of Assam. There is an Institute of Pharmacy attached to it.
- Government Dental College, Silchar
- S. M. Dev Civil Hospital, Silchar
- Cachar Cancer Hospital, Silchar - Established and is administered by the Cachar Cancer Hospital Society, a non-profit NGO registered under the Societies Registration Act.

=== Law colleges ===
- A. K. Chanda Law College at Tarapur.

== Notable people ==
- B. B. Bhattacharya
- Kalika Prasad Bhattacharya
- Arun Kumar Chanda
- Moinul Hoque Choudhury
- Pritam Das
- Santosh Mohan Dev
- Sushmita Dev
- Ullaskar Dutta
- Rajdeep Goala
- Nurul Huda
- Nihar Ranjan Laskar
- Dilip Kumar Paul
- Kabindra Purkayastha
- Ravi Kannan R
- Rajdeep Roy
- Debojit Saha
- Debattama Saha
- Bir Radha Sherpa
- Rahul Singh

== See also ==
- Satindra Mohan Dev Stadium
- Silchar Part-X
- 2022 Silchar Floods
