= Sylhetis =

Indo-Aryan ethnocultural group

Siloṭi
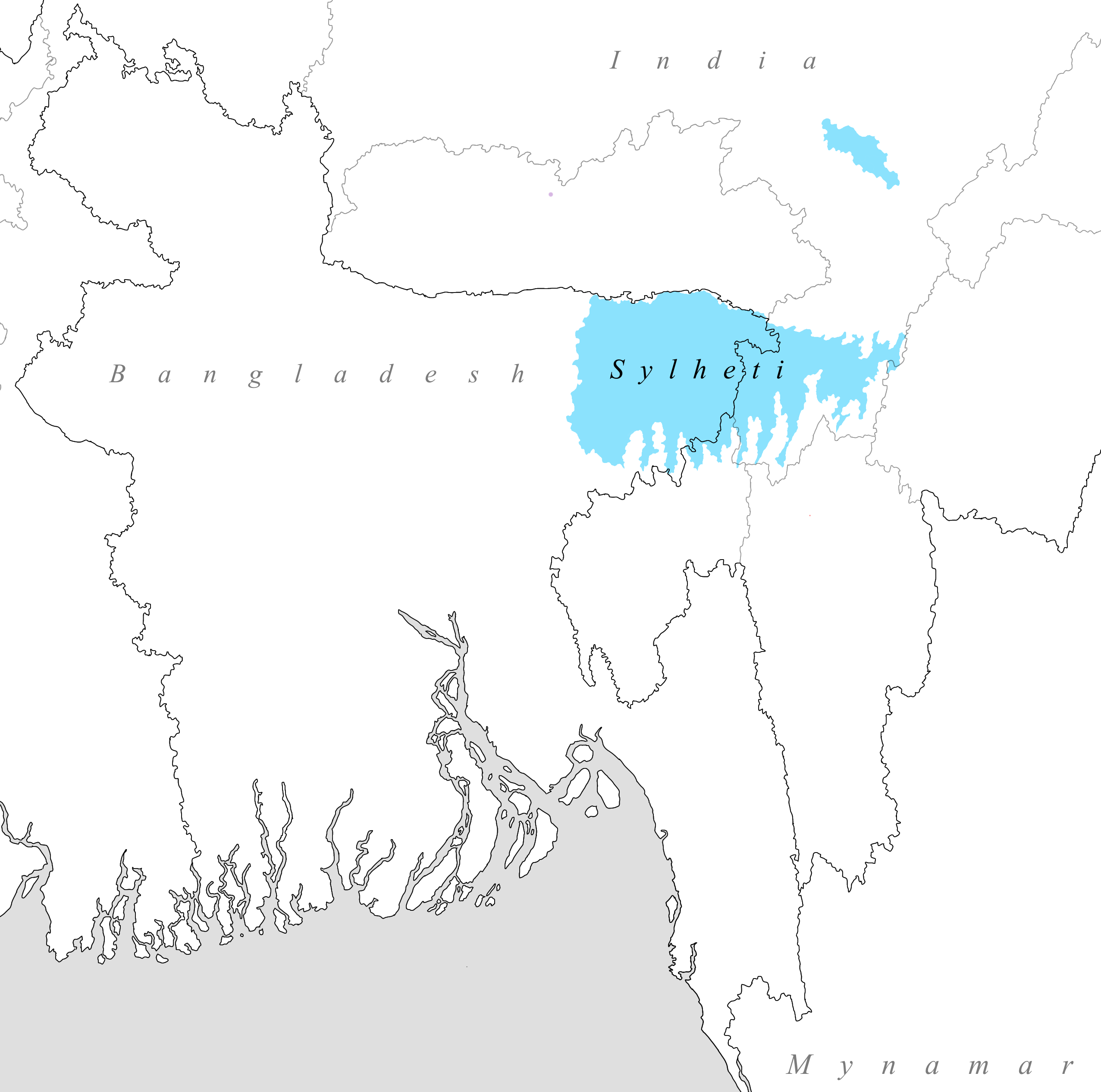
- Map of Sylheti speaking areas of South Asia

Total population
- c. 10.3 million

Regions with significant populations
- Bangladesh (Sylhet Division); India (Barak Valley, Hojai, North Tripura, Unakoti, Shillong); Middle East (GCC countries); Western world (United Kingdom, United States, Canada)

Languages
- Sylheti (L1); Standard Bengali (L2)

Religion
- In Bangladesh; Predominantly: Islam; Minority: Hinduism

Related ethnic groups
- Indo-Aryan peoples; Other Bengalis

The Sylheti (English: /sɪˈlɛti/) or Sylhetis are an Indo-Aryan ethnocultural group, that are associated with the Sylhet region (Sylhet Division of Bangladesh and the Karimganj district of south Assam, India). There are strong diasporic communities in Barak Valley of Assam, India, North Tripura, Shillong, Meghalaya, and Hojai, Central Assam. Outside South Asia, there are significant numbers in the United Kingdom, the United States, and Canada.

They speak Sylheti, an eastern Indo-Aryan language that is considered a distinct language by many and a dialect of Bengali by some others. Sylheti identity is associated primarily with its regional culture and language, alongside a broader cultural and ethnic Bengali identity.

== Etymology ==
The word Sylheti is derived from the ancient name Śrīhaṭṭiya, which takes its name from Śrīhaṭṭanātha, the tutelary deity of the Hindu Nātha dynasty who promoted the early settlement of Nāthas in the Surma and Barak valleys between the twelfth and thirteenth centuries, founding the Śrīhaṭṭa janapada and establishing Śrīhaṭṭanātha idols across the region. The later Hindu monarchs of Sylhet continued to pay tribute to the deity as Hāṭkeśvara or Haṭṭanātha as evident from the Devipurana and copper-plate inscriptions.

== Culture ==
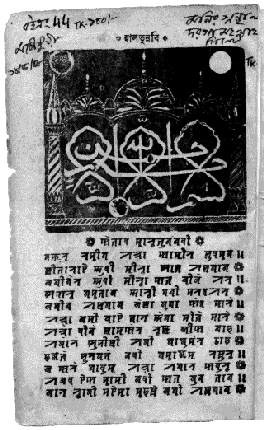
Front page of a Sylheti Nagari book titled Halat-un-Nabi, written in the mid-19th century by Sadeq Ali

Sylheti culture, while considered a subculture of Bengali culture, is distinguished by its unique linguistic, historical, and regional characteristics.

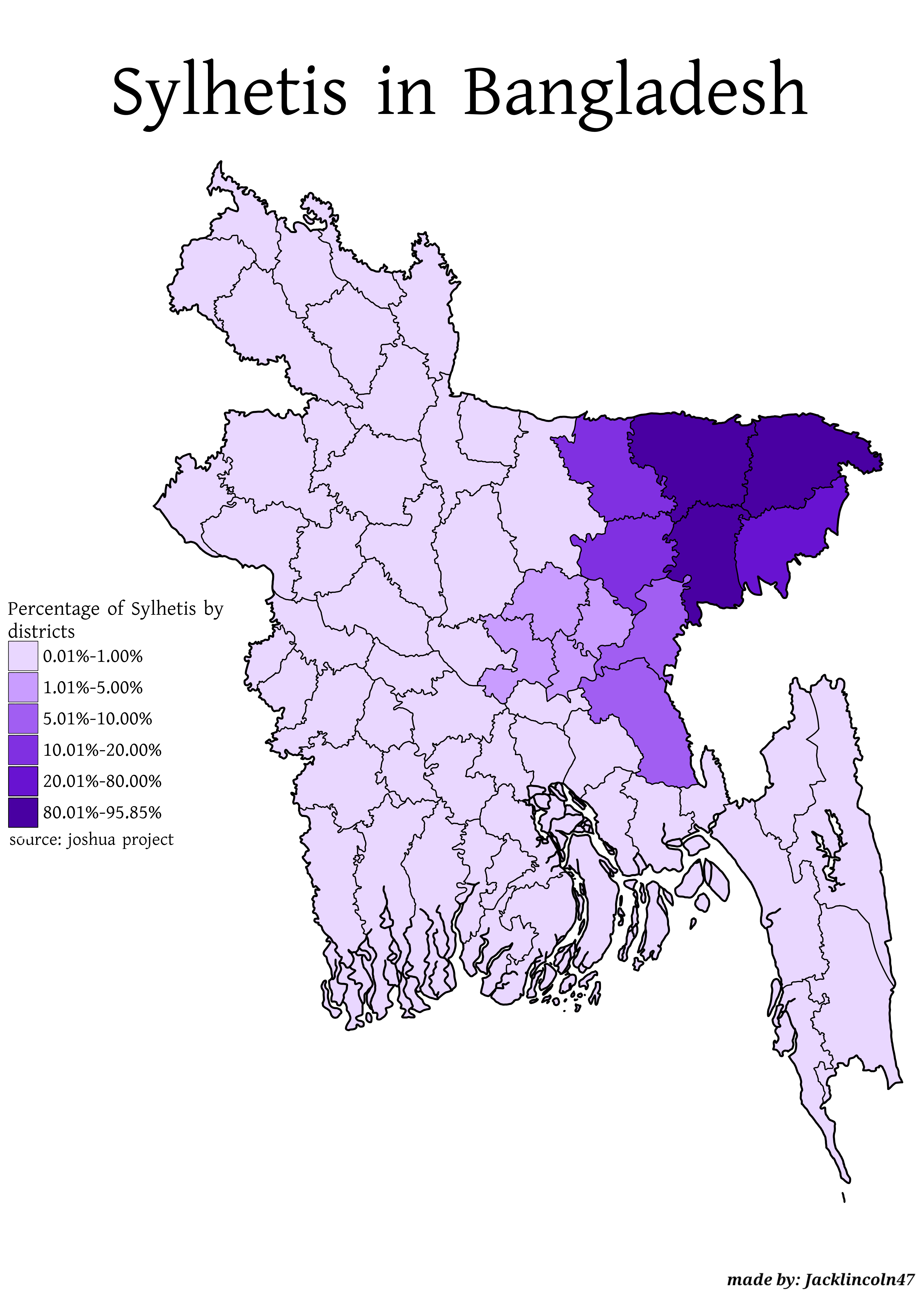
A map showing the distribution of Sylhetis in Bangladesh.

The Sylheti language, which some consider as a dialect of Bengali, while many linguists consider it as a distinct language, is central to Sylheti identity. Its unique phonetic qualities and vocabulary often make it unintelligible to standard Bengali speakers, which contributes to a sense of separateness among Sylhetis. In addition, Sylhetis have a strong regional identity that was strengthened by the historical shifts of the Sylhet region between Assam and Bengal during British rule. These transitions were pivotal in developing a distinct Sylheti identity, due to the region’s geographical isolation and its historical and cultural ties with Bengal. Many Sylhetis today continue to identify with both the broader Bengali and their distinct Sylheti ethnocultural identities.

Sylheti folklore is unique to the region, it is influenced by Hindu, Sufi, Turco-Persian and native ideas. Chandra Kumar De of Mymensingh is known to be the first researcher of Sylheti folklore. Archives of old works are kept in Kendriya Muslim Sahitya Sangsad in Sylhet (also known as the Sylhet Central Muslim Literary Society) – the oldest literary organisation in Bengal and one of the oldest in the subcontinent.

=== Literature ===
==== Sylheti Nagri ====
A distinct linguistic register emerged in the Sylhet region through the development of the Sylheti Nagri script. Though having similar features to the more prevalent Dobhashi literary register of Middle Bengali, the Sylheti Nagri script fostered a unique literary culture of the Sylhet region. Its distinction is marked with its simpler script which is related to the Kaithi script, and its phonology being deeply influenced by the Sylheti vernacular. Its most renowned writer was Sadeq Ali whose Halatunnabi was famed as household item among rural Muslim communities. Manuscripts have been found of works such as Rag Namah by Fazil Nasim Muhammad, Shonabhaner Puthi by Abdul Karim, and the earliest known work Talib Huson (1549) by Gholam Huson. Late Nagri writers include Muhammad Haidar Chaudhuri who wrote Ahwal-i-Zamana in 1907 and Muhammad Abdul Latif who wrote Pohela Kitab o Doikhurar Rag in 1930. From around the middle of 20th century, Sylheti Nagri had faced near-extinction as most Sylheti Nagri printing presses fell out of use or were destroyed during the Bangladeshi Liberation War in 1971. Recently there have been efforts in reviving the script, including from the British Bangladeshi diaspora, as the script is viewed as a unique cultural marker that distinguishes Sylhetis from Bengali identity.

==== Bengali ====
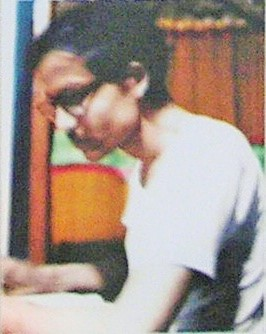
Chittaranjan Deb, writing an article at his Shantiniketan house balcony.

It has been argued that the first Bengali translation of the Mahabharata was written by Sri Sanjay of Sylhet in the 17th century. The 18th-century Hattanather Panchali (Hattanath chronicles) written by Ganesh Ram Shiromani was a Bengali ballad of 36,000 lines which detail the early history of Sylhet though its authenticity is questionable. When Sylhet was under the rule of the Twipra Kingdom, medieval Sylheti writers using the Bengali script included the likes of Dwija Pashupati, the author of Chandravali – considered one of the earliest Sylheti works. Nasiruddin Haydar of Sylhet town wrote the Tawarikh-e-Jalali, the first Bengali biography of Shah Jalal. Gobind Gosai of Masulia wrote Nirbban Shongit, Gopinath Dutta wrote Dronporbbo, Dotto Bongshaboli and Nariporbbo and Nur Ali Khan of Syedpur wrote Marifoti Geet. Songwriters and poets such as Radharaman Dutta, Hason Raja and Shah Abdul Karim, significantly contributed to Bengali literature and their works remain popular across Bengal in present-times. Numerous Bengali writers emerged in Ita, such as Kobi Muzaffar Khan, Gauri Shankar Bhatta and Golok Chand Ghosh. Muslim literature was based upon historical affairs and biographies of prominent Islamic figures.

The first Sylheti to pursue journalism professionally was Nagendra Chandra Shyam, editor of Vabishat and Surma and a pioneer of Rabindra Sangeet in the Sylhet region. Other exponents of Rabindra Sangeet based in Shantiniketan of Sylheti origin include Chittaranjan Deb and Asoke Bijay Raha. In 2021, Shuvagoto Chowdhury was awarded the Bangla Academy Literary Award.

==== Other languages ====
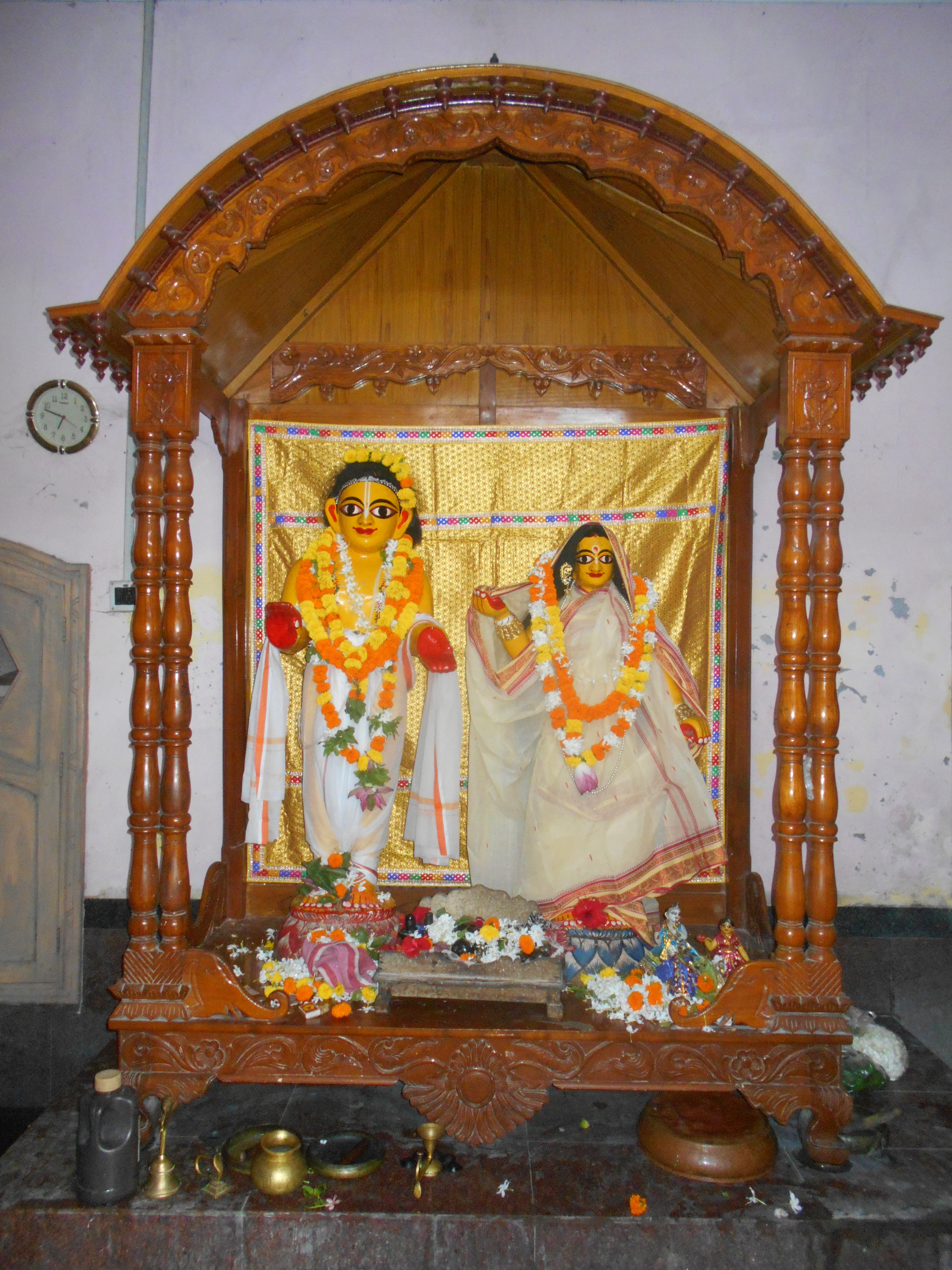
Sanskrit writer Advaita Acharya is venerated across Bangladesh and West Bengal.

Throughout the course of recorded history, Sylhetis have made significant, meaningful, and lasting contributions to the vast and complex corpus of Sanskrit literature, a classical language that had served Sylhetis as a critical medium for religious, philosophical, and scholarly discourse for millennia. These contributions span various periods and demonstrate the enduring intellectual and literary engagement of Sylheti scholars with Sanskritic traditions. During the 15th century, the Naiyayika philosopher Jagadish Tarkalankar emerged as a prominent literary figure in Sylhet, dedicating much of his scholarly life to the composition and compilation of several Sanskrit works. He authored numerous books that were comprehensive in nature and often divided into multiple volumes, indicating the depth and breadth of his scholarly pursuits. Among these works, perhaps the most renowned and influential was the Sanskrit textbook Shabdashaktiprakashika. A contemporary of Tarkalankar was Advaita Acharya (1434–1559) of Laur, a spiritual leader still revered today as a saint. He is best known as a formative figure in the Krishnaite Gaudiya Vaishnavism movement. Acharya contributed two notable works to the corpus of medieval Sanskrit literature: Yogavasishtha-Bhaishta, which explored profound spiritual and philosophical themes, and Geeta Bhaishya, an exegetical commentary on the revered Bhagavad Gita.

In the 16th century, the Sylheti physician Murari Gupta wrote the first Sanskrit biography of Chaitanya Mahaprabhu, thereby contributing to both hagiographical literature and the devotional Bhakti movement that was sweeping across Bengal and beyond during this time. Another highly prolific scholar, Raghunath Shiromani, composed 40 distinct works in the Sanskrit language.

Some works written by Sylhetis have also been translated into other languages. For example, Ashraf Hussain's Manipurer Ladai was translated into English by Dinesh Chandra Sen and included in the Eastern Bengal Ballads.

== Distribution ==
=== Diaspora ===
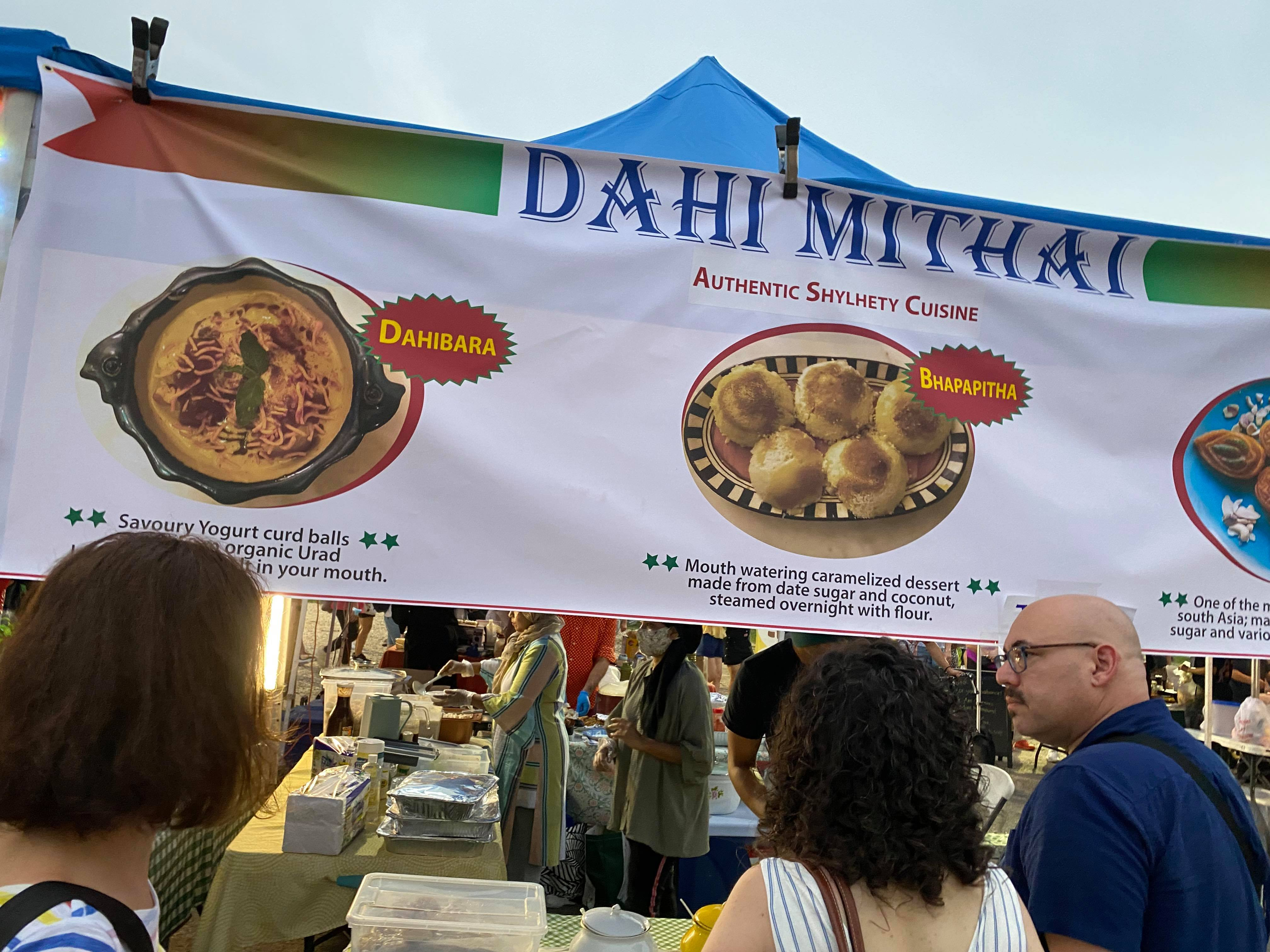
Sylheti food stall at the Queens Night Market in New York City

Lord Cornwallis introduced the Permanent Settlement Act of Bengal in 1793 and it altered the social, political and economic landscape of the Sylhet region; socioeconomic ramification for former landlords was severe as the land changed hands. On juxtapose, colonial administration opened new windows of opportunities for young men, who sought employment merchant ship companies. Young men from Sylhet boarded ships primarily at Kolkata, Mumbai and Singapore. Many Sylheti people believed that seafaring was a historical and cultural inheritance due to a large proportion of Sylheti Muslims being descended from foreign traders, lascars and businessman from the Middle East and Central Asia who migrated to the Sylhet region before and after the Conquest of Sylhet. Kasa Miah, who was a Sylheti migrant, claimed this was a very encouraging factor for Sylhetis to travel to Calcutta aiming to eventually reach the United States and United Kingdom.

==== Barak Valley ====
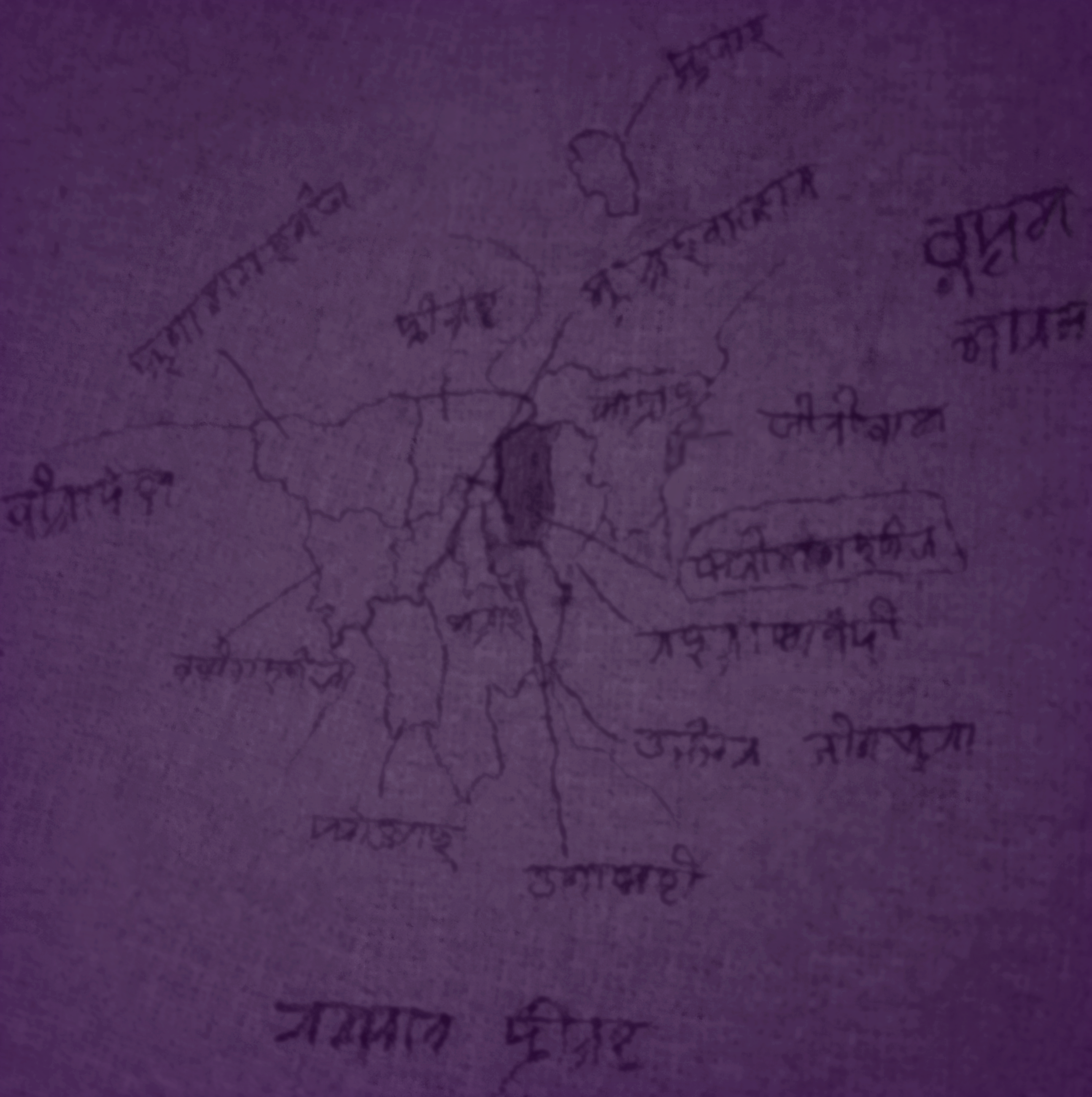
Sylheti nationalist map spotted on a wall in Karimganj, Assam

The Sylheti community in the Barak Valley, contiguous to Sylhet, is the eminent community of this region where they have been able to retain the Sylhet environ in a smaller part of the larger Sylheti state. The Barak Valley consists of three districts in the Indian state of Assam, which are home to a Bengali-speaking majority population as opposed to Assamese. Geographically the region is surrounded by hills from all three sides except its western plain boundary with Bangladesh. Always a part of Sylhet, the Barak Valley hosts the presence of the same Sylheti dialect. Niharranjan Ray, author of Bangalir Itihash, claims that "South Assam / Northeastern Bengal or Barak Valley is the extension of the Greater Surma/Meghna Valley of Bengal in every aspect from culture to geography".

A movement emerged in the 1960s in this Sylheti-majority area of India. Referred to as the Bengali Language Movement of the Barak Valley, Sylhetis protested against the decision of the Government of Assam to make Assamese the only sole official language of the state knowing full well that 80% of the Barak Valley people are Sylhetis. The main incident took place on 19 May 1961 at Silchar railway station in which 11 Sylhetis were killed by the Assamese police. Sachindra Chandra Pal and Kamala Bhattacharya were two notable Sylheti students murdered by the Assam Rifles during the movement.

==== Outside South Asia ====
Today, the Sylheti diaspora numbers around one million, mainly concentrated in the United Kingdom, United States, Canada, Germany, Italy, France, Australia, Portugal, Spain, Sweden, Finland and the Middle East and other European countries. However, a 2008 study showed that 95% of Sylheti diaspora live in the UK. In the United States, most Sylhetis live in New York City, though sizeable populations also live in Atlanta, Houston, Dallas, Los Angeles, Miami, and Detroit.

Some argue that remittances sent from Sylheti diaspora around the world back to Bangladesh have negatively affected development in Bangladesh, where a lack of government initiatives has caused economic inertia.

According to neo-classical theory, the poorest would move to the richest countries and those from densely populated areas would move to more sparsely populated regions. This has clearly not been the case. The brain drain was a movement from core to core, purely on economic maximisation, while it was young Sylheti pioneers with access to financial resources that migrated from a severely overpopulated Bangladesh to the overcrowded streets of Spitalfields, poorest from all parts of Bangladesh migrated to Sylhet for a better life, causing a severe overcrowding and scarcity of resources in Sylhet.

== Religion ==
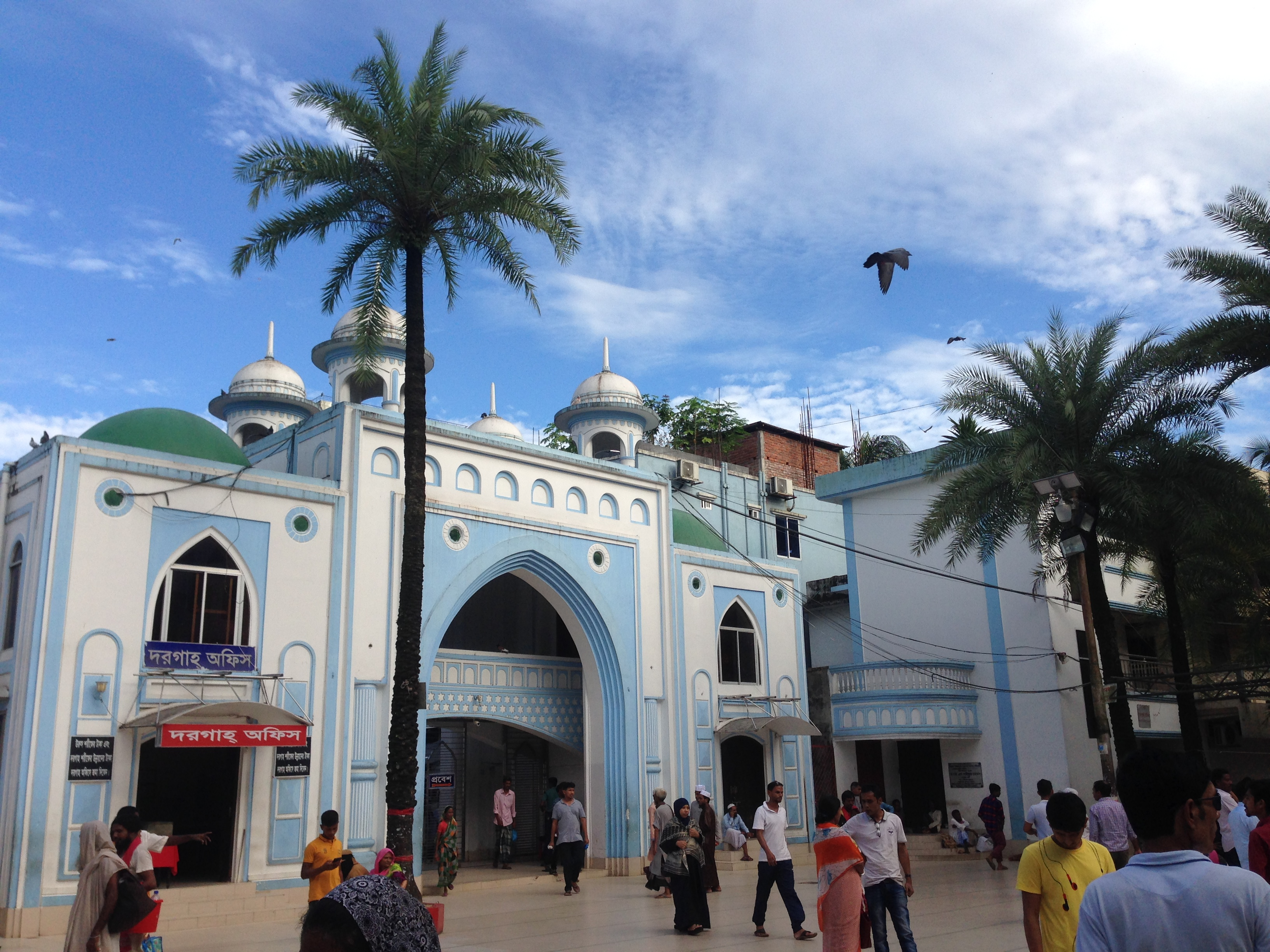
Shah Jalal Dargah is a Shrine of the 14th century Sufi saint Shah Jalal, located in Sylhet, Bangladesh.

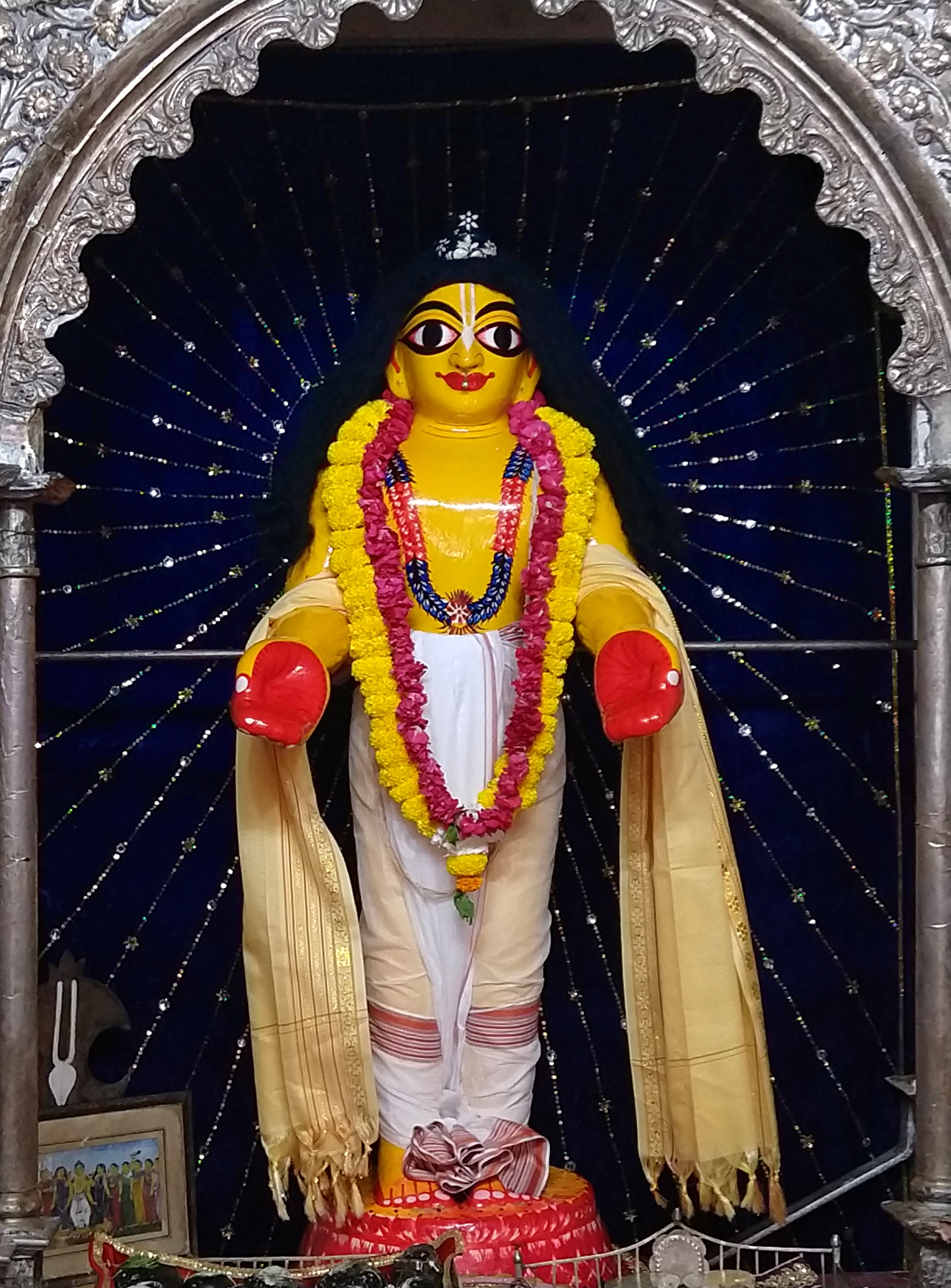
Wooden murti of the Sylheti preacher Chaitanya Mahaprabhu as Dhāmeśvara in Nabadwip, Nadia district, West Bengal.

Sunni Islam is the largest denomination with majority following the Hanafi school of law. There are significant numbers of people who follow Sufi ideals, although the revivalist Deobandi movement is also popular with many being a part of the Tablighi Jamaat. There is a very small minority of Shia Muslims who gather every year during Ashura for the Mourning of Muharram processions. Places of procession include the Prithimpasha Nawab Bari in Kulaura, home to a Shia family, as well as Balaganj, Osmani Nagar and Rajtila.

The Sylheti Ahmadiyya Muslim Community is mostly concentrated in Selbaras, which was the ancestral home of Ahmad Toufiq Choudhury, the current leader of Ahmadiyya Muslim Jama'at Bangladesh. Established in the early 20th century, the community's unique beliefs, particularly the recognition of Mirza Ghulam Ahmad as the Promised Messiah and Mahdi, distinguish them from Sunni and Shia Muslims, often leading to tensions with other Muslim groups.

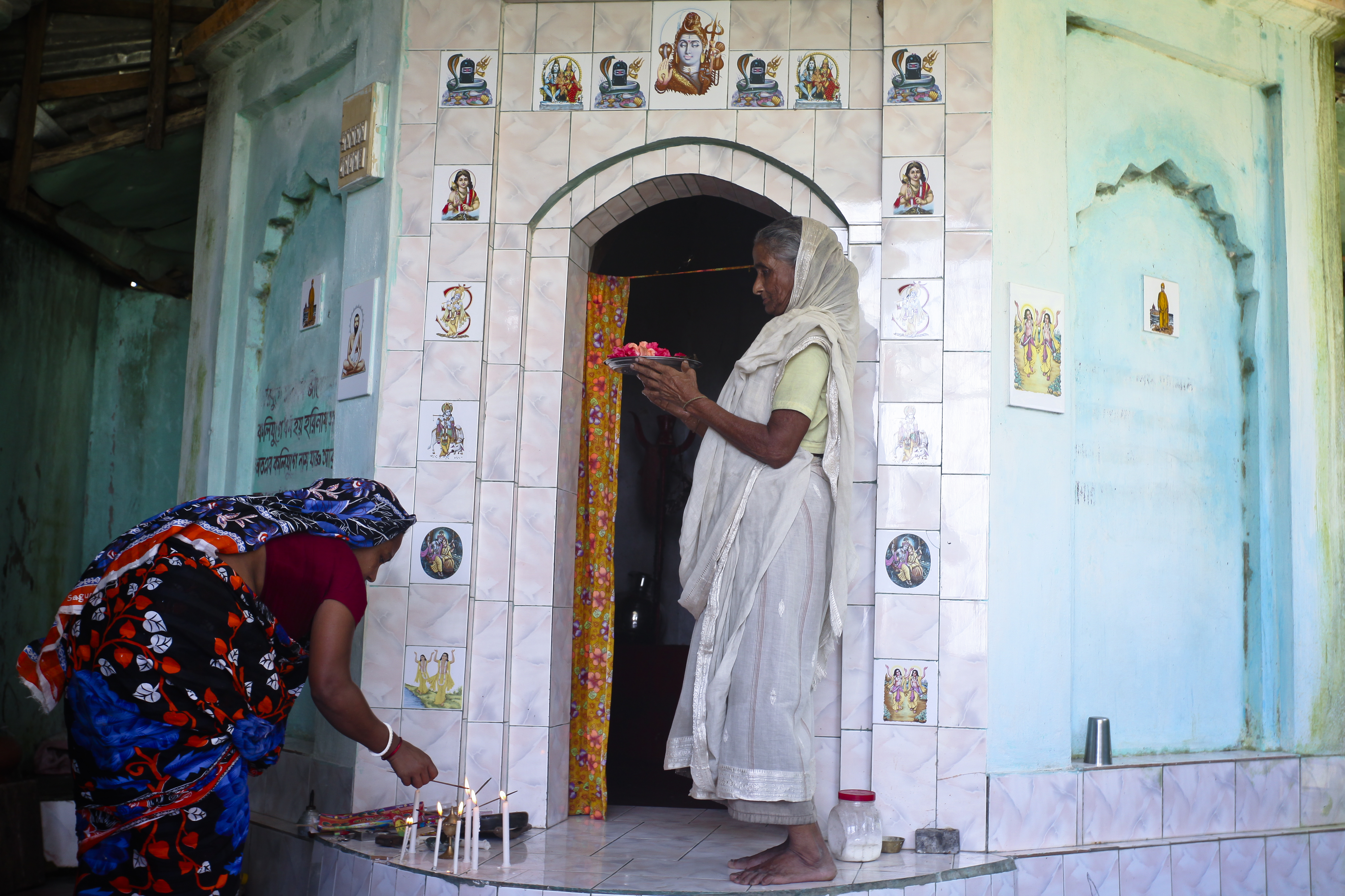
Two Sylheti women partaking in their prayers at a local Hindu village temple

Hinduism today is the second-largest religion among Sylhetis, and Sylhet hosts the highest proportion of Hindus in Bangladesh. After the Partition of India in 1947, Sylhetis that followed Hinduism were targets of persecution. In August 1949, the Hindus of Beanibazar and Barlekha had their houses looted, destroyed and set on fire and they were then assaulted, murdered and raped. Over 800 Sylheti temples were desecrated in the following year. Leading Sylheti politicians belonging to the Hindu community such as Suresh Chandra Biswas, Zamindar of Kulaura Mohini Mohan Kar and Kripesh Chandra Bhattacharya attempted to protest against these atrocities but were arrested. During the Bangladesh Liberation War, the Krishnapur massacre, Makalkandi massacre, Adityapur massacre, Burunga massacre, Galimpur massacre, Naria massacre were major upsets for Sylheti Hindus. The neck of Satis is believed by Sylhetis who follow Hinduism to have fallen in Jainpur village in Dakshin Surma and is now housed in the Shri Shail, which is one of the main Shakta pithas in Sylhet. Chaitanya Mahaprabhu, the founder of the Krishnaite Gaudiya Vaishnavism and part of the Bhakti movement, was a Sylheti and still has many Sylheti followers who worship him as an incarnation of Krishna.

Alongside institutional Islam and Hinduism, Sylheti society has historically preserved a rich layer of folk, indigenous, and religious syncretisms. These belief systems developed parallel to classical Hinduism and Islam and continue to influence rural religious life, ritual practice, and cultural identity for Sylhetis as the Folk deities of Sylhet in addition to Hattanath, the guardian deity of Sylhet city. This religious layer centers on the worship of multiple localized deities—village guardians, fertility mothers, snake goddesses, forest and water spirits. Sylheti religious practice emphasizes immanent sacredness, locating divine presence in trees, rivers, fields, hills, and ancestral sites. Rituals are commonly conducted at open-air shrines beneath ancient banyan, peepal, or jackfruit trees, with stones, branches, or earthen markers serving as aniconic representations of the gods. Offerings of milk, fruits, grain, and sweets are made without strict Brahmanical mediation, and ritual authority frequently rests with women, cultivators, fishermen, and village elders. This synthesis of animism and fertility cults constitutes one of the oldest and most persistent dimensions of Sylheti religious life, demonstrating the region’s deep continuity with polytheism. Muslim communities in the region, particularly in rural areas, often partake in these indigenous rituals. Muslims may honor deities like Badshah (a regional form of Bhairava), making offerings and performing vows for health, protection, and fertility, despite the practices' Hindu origins. This syncretism reflects a long history of cultural fusion where the boundaries between Hindu and Muslim religious life are often fluid. As such, the shared participation in these polytheistic rituals underscores a distinctive feature of Sylheti spirituality, where both Hindus and Muslims engage in folk practices, reinforcing the continuity of ancient religious traditions.

The Bauls are also an integral part of Sylheti religious life, a unique syncretic tradition that transcends rigid religious boundaries. Bauls are itinerant folk singers, poets, and mystics who emphasize personal, emotional experiences of the divine over ritualistic worship. Their teachings and practices emphasize the internal realization of divinity and the unity of the human soul with the Moner Manush. Baul sessions often speak of love, devotion, and the search for the divine within oneself, with a particular focus on the union of the soul (the atman) with the universal spirit. They are revered by Sylhetis who are Muslim or Hindu, reflecting the region’s long-standing tradition of religious pluralism. Rooted in both physical esotericism and impuristic occultism, emphasizes the use of the body (deho hadon) and mind (mon hadon) in spiritual practice. Their rituals, often hidden from outsiders due to their potentially controversial nature, focus on body fluids, the "nine doors" (body openings), and 'Foran' (life force energy) through breathwork. In Baulism, women hold a sacred role, particularly as the Tantric consort (hadon hongini), revered as the source of spiritual success. This relationship is considered more important than the male practitioner, and some Bauls use non-traditional forms of marriage, like the malabodol or garland exchange, which is spiritually binding. Bauls also engage in the use of narcotics, such as marijuana and hashish, believing they enhance mental clarity and aid in their spiritual practices. A controversial practice involves the creation of a ritual substance called Prembhaja, composed of bodily fluids, used in their pursuit of enlightenment, linking their practices to occult traditions. During the time of Lalon, Sylhet was known to have been home to Baul centres.

Other minority religions include Christianity and there was a presence of Sikhism after Guru Nanak's visit to Sylhet in 1508 to spread the religion and build a gurdwara there. This Gurdwara was visited twice by Tegh Bahadur and many hukamnamas were issued to this temple in Sylhet by Guru Gobind Singh. In 1897, the gurdwara collapsed after the earthquake.

== Notables ==
Popular modern writers and poets from the region include Abdur Rouf Choudhury, Dilwar Khan and Chowdhury Gulam Akbar. Muhammad Mojlum Khan is a non-fiction writer best known for writing the English biographical dictionary, The Muslim 100. Prominent Bengali language non-fiction writers include Syed Murtaza Ali, Syed Mujtaba Ali, Dewan Mohammad Azraf, Abed Chaudhury, Achyut Charan Choudhury, Arun Kumar Chanda, Asaddor Ali, Ashraf Hussain and Dwijen Sharma.

Reputed artists and media personalities from the region include Salman Shah who is considered one of the greatest actors in Bangladeshi film industry, Runa Laila who is a prominent singer with international acclaim, Hason Raja and Shah Abdul Karim who are the pioneers of folk music in Bangladesh.

Cricket and football are the most popular sports among Sylhetis. Many Sylheti cricketers have played for the Bangladesh national cricket team such as Alok Kapali, Enamul Haque Jr, Nazmul Hossain, Rajin Saleh and Tapash Baisya. Beanibazar SC is the only Sylheti club which as qualified for the Bangladesh League and Alfaz Ahmed was a Sylheti who played for the Bangladesh national football team. Hamza Choudhury is the first Bangladeshi to play in the Premier League and is predicted to be the first British Asian to play for the England national football team. Bulbul Hussain was the first breakthrough Sylheti professional wheelchair rugby player. Rani Hamid is one of the most successful chess players in the world, winning championships in Asia and Europe multiple times. Ramnath Biswas was a revolutionary soldier who embarked on three world tours on a bicycle in the 19th century.

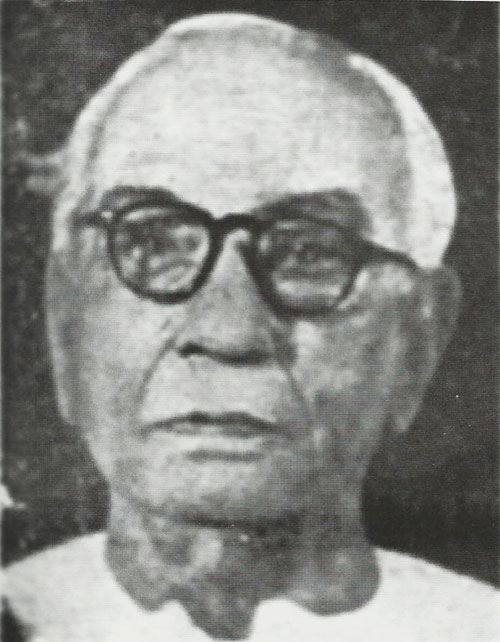
Sundari Mohan Das was a veteran of the Swadeshi movement and founder of Calcutta National Medical College

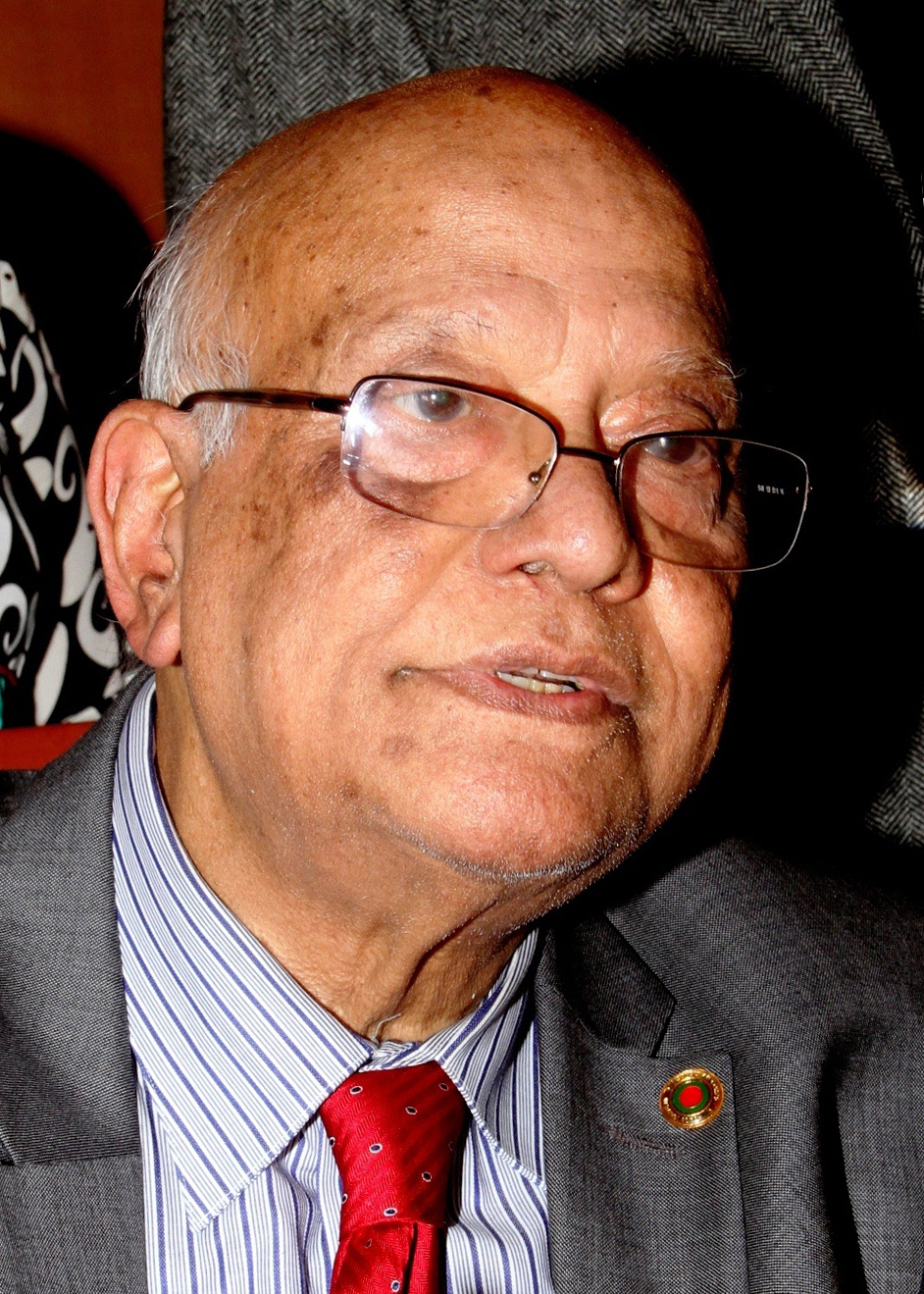
Abul Maal Abdul Muhith, an economist, diplomat, and Bengali language movement veteran who served as Bangladesh's second Finance Minister.

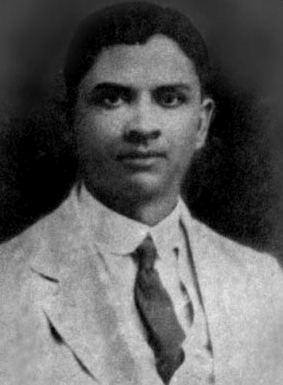
Gurusaday Dutt was the founder of the Bratachari movement which advocated for spiritual and social development

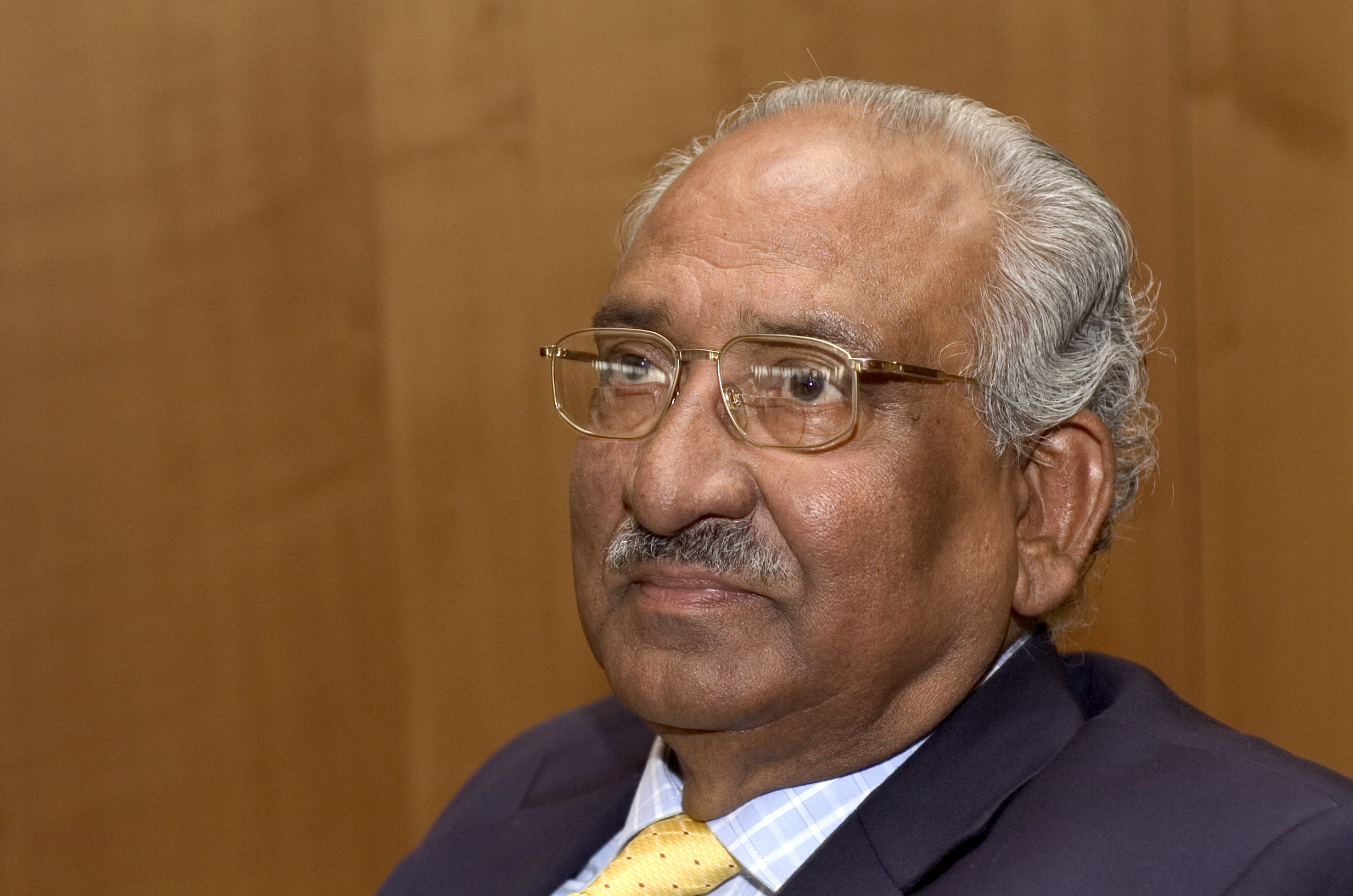
Saifur Rahman (Bangladeshi politician), an economist, politician, and who served as Bangladesh's second Finance Minister.

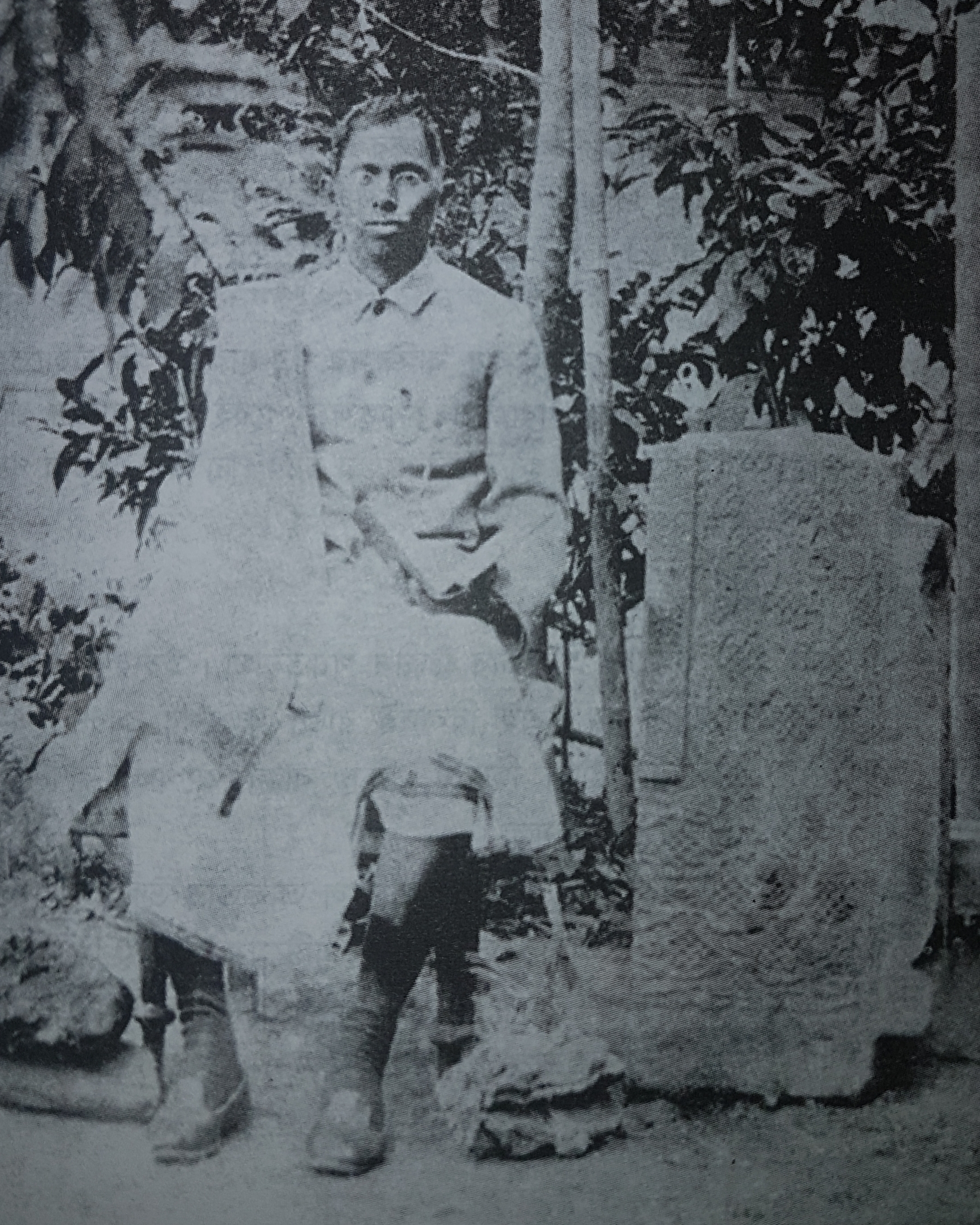
Achyut Charan Choudhury is most well known for his monumental work on the history of the Sylhet

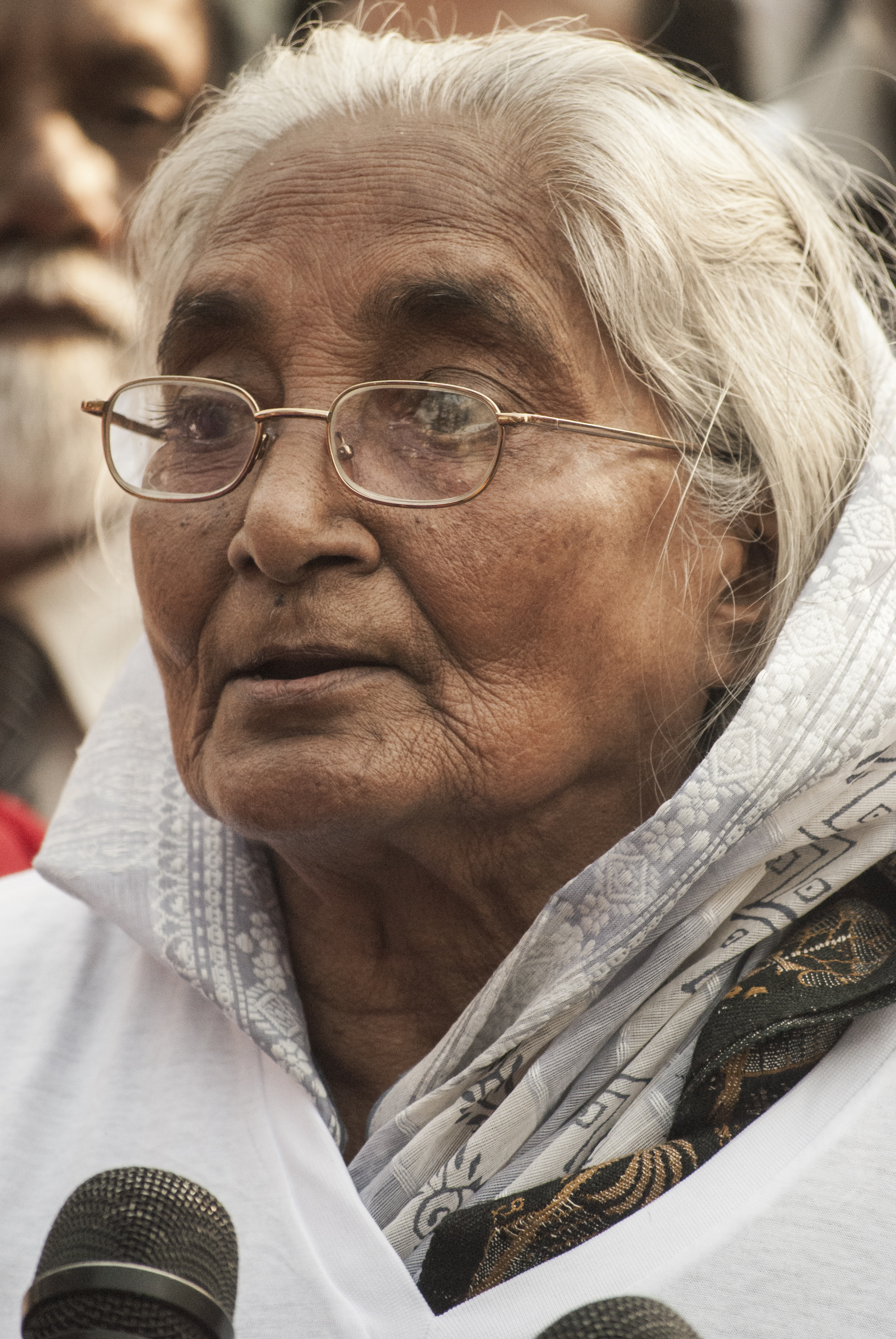
Rawshan Ara Bachchu is a Sylheti activist best known for her role in the Bengali language movement of 1952

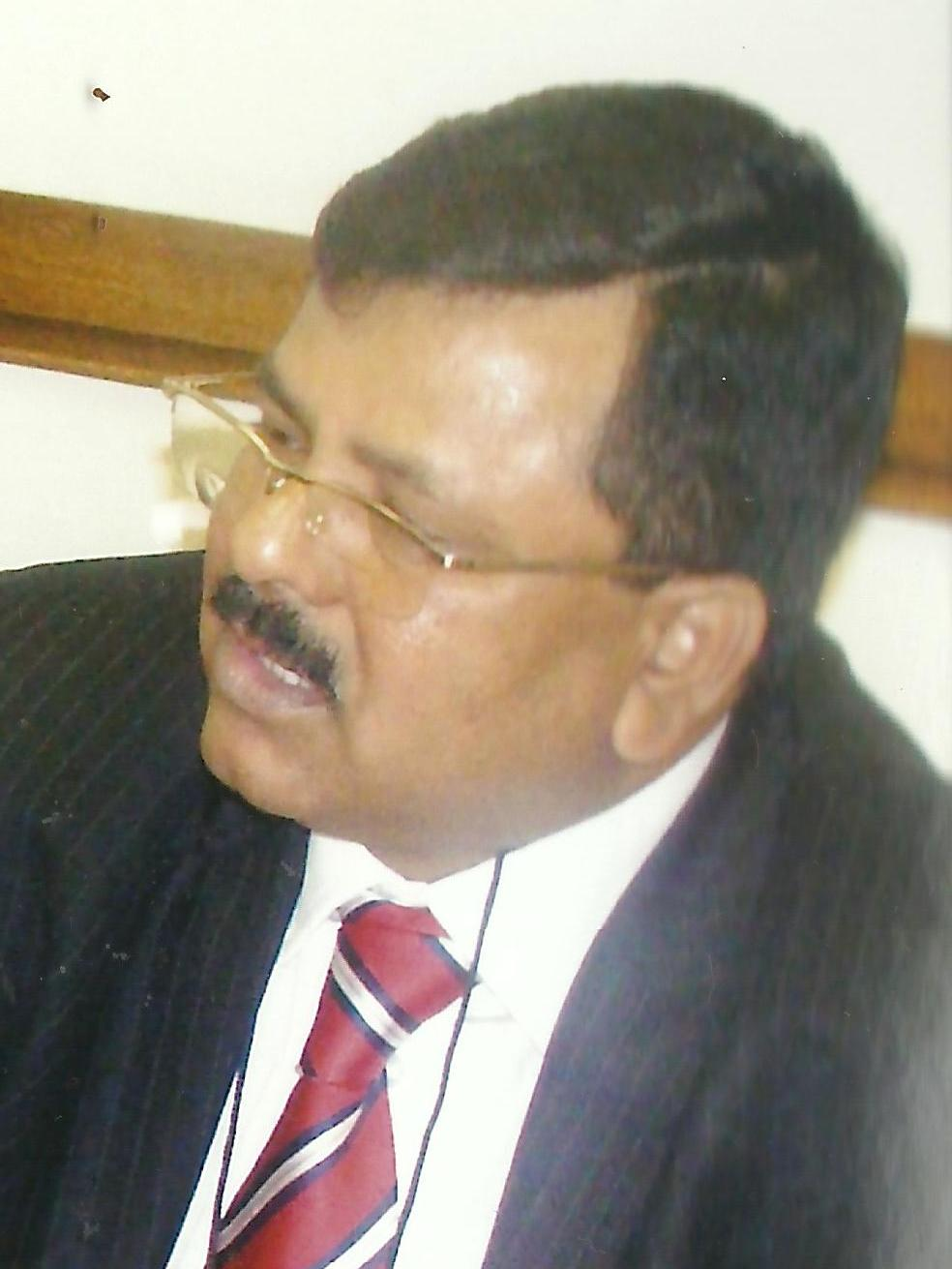
M. Ilias Ali was a prominent politician in Sylhet and served as the Organising Secretary of the Bangladesh Nationalist Party

== See also ==
- History of Sylhet
- World Sylhet Convention
- Lascar (novel)

== General and cited references ==
- Bhattacharjee, Nabanipa (2013). "'We are with culture but without geography': locating Sylheti identity in contemporary India". In Fazal, Tanweer (ed.). Minority Nationalisms in South Asia. Routledge. pp. 53–67. ISBN 978-1-317-96647-0.
- Deb, Pallab; Bhan, Samiksha (2016). Little Sylhet: A Report on The East Bengali Community in Barak Valley, Southern Assam (PDF) (Report). Center for Development Economics. Archived from the original (PDF) on 18 May 2022.
- Mahanta, Sakuntala; Gope, Amalesh (2018). "Tonal polarity in Sylheti in the context of noun faithfulness". Language Sciences. 69: 80–97. doi:10.1016/j.langsci.2018.06.010. S2CID 149759441.
- Rasinger, Sebastian M. (2007). Bengali-English in East London: A Study in Urban Multilingualism. Peter Lang. ISBN 978-3-03-911036-0.
- Khan, Sameer Ud Dowla (21 February 2018). "Amago Bhasha: In celebration of our ethnic and linguistic diversity". Dhaka Tribune.
