= Chandicharan Sutradhar =

Indian language activist

Chandicharan Sutradhar (died 19 May 1961) was an Indian language activist who was martyred in the Bengali Language Movement in Silchar.

== Biography ==
Sutradhar was a member of the Bengali Language Movement. At his workshop, Sutradhar shared information about the Bengali language movement and the problems of the Bengali speaking people with other protesters, such as Birendra Sutradhar.

On 19 May 1961, a satyagraha was organized at the Tarapur railway station in Silchar demanding that Bengali become the medium of education and in protest against the decision of the Government of Assam to make Assamese the state's sole official language. The rail blockade programme had passed off peacefully in the morning. In the afternoon, the Assam Rifles had begun to arrive at the railway station. Around 2:35pm, the paramilitary troops began to beat the protesters with rifle butts and batons and later the police opened fire on the protesters. Within a span of seven minutes, the troops fired 17 rounds of bullets. Sutradhar was among the eleven protestors who died.
