= Hattanath =

- Srihatta
- Other names: Bateshwar
- Region: Sylhet Division

In Hinduism, Hattanath (Bengali: হট্টনাথ hôṭṭônath; Devanagari: हट्टनाथ haṭṭanātha), who is also known as Hatkeshwar (Bengali: হাটকেশ্বর haṭkeśśôr; Devanagari: हाटकेश्वर hāṭkeśvara) or Bateshwar (Bengali: বটেশ্বর bôṭeśśôr; Devanagari: वटेश्वर vaṭeśvara), is the tutelary deity of the city of Sylhet (Śrīhaṭṭa) in present-day Bangladesh. He is a form of Shiva.

== Origins and significance ==
According to Partha Sarathi Nath, Sylhet and the Barak Valley were ruled by the Nātha dynasty of nearby Tripura between the twelfth and thirteenth centuries, which promoted the early settlement of Nāthas and their cultural influence in this region. Among these influences is the patronage of Śrīhaṭṭanātha as the titular deity, from which the city of Sylhet (Śrīhaṭṭa) ultimately takes its name. The Nāthas are considered to be the founders of the Śrīhaṭṭa janapada and were responsible for establishing Śrīhaṭṭanātha idols across the region. The ruins of a Śrīhaṭṭanātha temple are preserved in the headquarters of the Central Muslim Literary Society in Sylhet's Dargah Gate, near the hill of Mona Rai (Monarayer Tila). A Shiva temple known as Śrīhaṭṭanātha from the reign of Isana Deva has been discovered. Mujibur Rahman Chowdhury mentions that the hill was formerly home to an akhara for Nātha Yogi Sannyasis.

হট্টনাথের পাঁচালী (Panchali of Hattanath)

পুনির বিল ছাড়িয়া রাজা ছিলটেতে গেল
punir bil chhaṛiya raja silôṭete gelô
From the beel of Puni, the King went to Sylhet
অট্টনাথের পূজা দিয়া ঠাকুরালি পাইল।
ôttônather pūja diẏa ṭhakurali pailô
Giving Puja to Hattanath, he gained mastery

— A poem written by 18th-century poet Ganesh Ram Shiromani.

Other researchers considered Sylhet's titular deity of Hattanath to have been introduced by the Nagar Brahmin who worshipped Hāṭkeśvara and its presence in Sylhet (Śrīhaṭṭa) is mentioned in the Mahalingarchana Tantra. The Nagar Brahmins later settled down in Gujarat, which can be supposed from Padmanath Bhattacharya's analysis. Both Hattanath and its alias Hatkeshwar are considered to be idols of Shiva, and they can be found in various parts of the Sylhet District such as in Bhatera, Panchakhanda, Gotatikar and Chutkhal.

In the 18th-century, Ganesh Ram Shiromani compiled a series of semi-legendary Bengali ballads which claim to detail the early history of Sylhet. Though the book does not hold much authenticity, it is popularly known as the Panchali of Haṭṭanāth, and mention of Sylhet's final Hindu king Gour Govinda worshipping Haṭṭanāth after returning to Sylhet can be found. Govinda's predecessors were also known to have held convocations to worship Haṭṭanāth. A particularly notable one was held in Brahmachal to rectify those who had deviated from the path of Haṭṭanāth.

== See also ==
- Folk deities of Sylhet
