= Shamshernagar Union =

Union in Moulvibazar, Sylhet, Bangladesh

Shamshernagar Union শমশেরনগর ইউনিয়ন
- Union
- No. 04 Shamshernagar Union Council
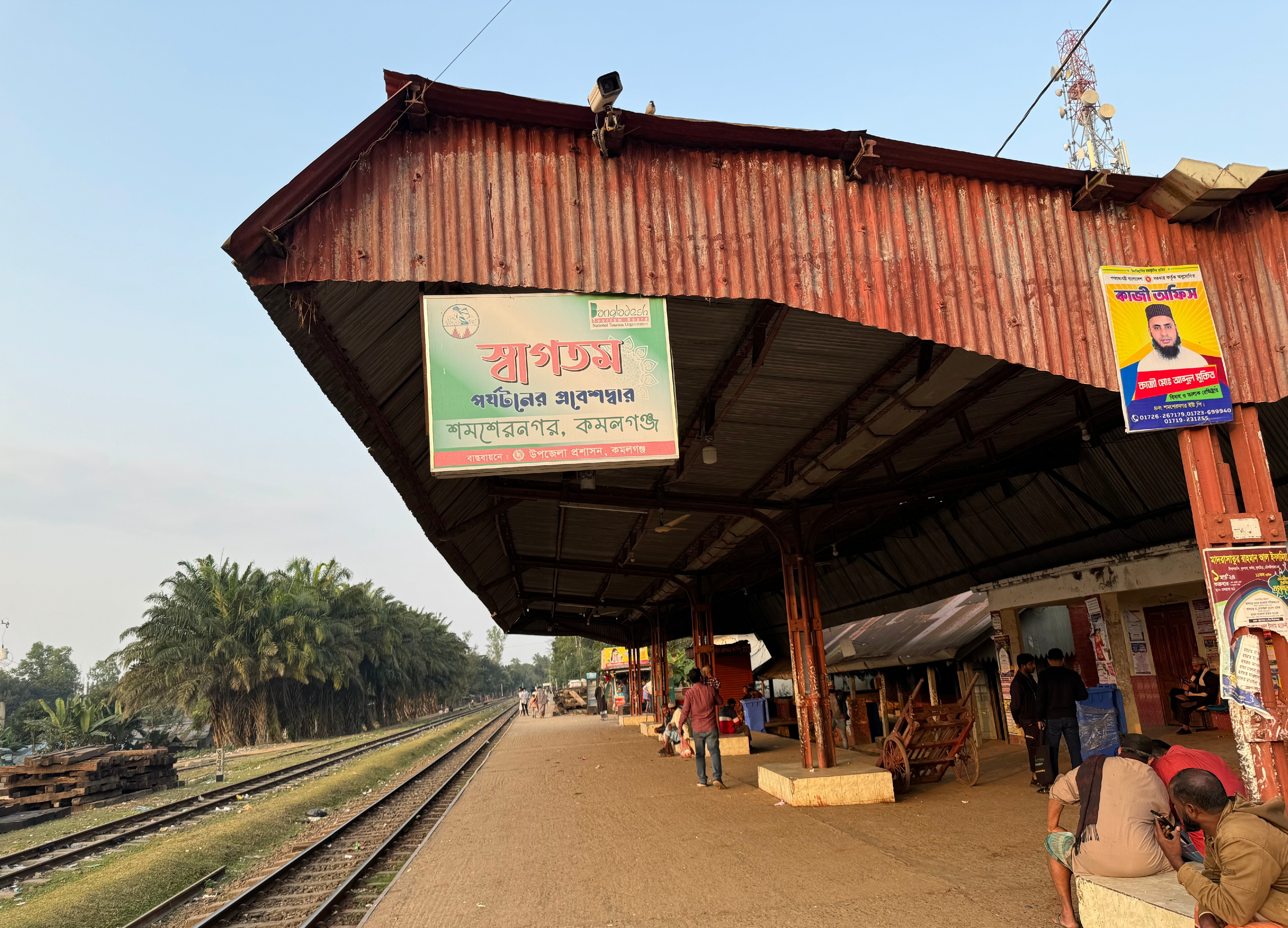
- Shamshernagar Railway Station

- Location within Bangladesh
- Coordinates: 24.4778°N 91.7667°E
- Country: Bangladesh
- Division: Sylhet
- District: Moulvibazar
- Upazila: Kamalganj

Government
  - Union Parishad Chairman: Jewel Ahmed

Area
  - Total: 32.28 km^{2} (12.46 sq mi)

Population (2011)
  - Total: 33,231
  - Density: 1,029/km^{2} (2,666/sq mi)
- Time zone: UTC+6 (BST)
- Website: shamshernagarup.moulvibazar.gov.bd

Shamshernagar Union (Bengali: শমশেরনগর ইউনিয়ন) is a union parishad under Kamalganj Upazila, Moulvibazar District, Sylhet Division, Bangladesh. The union has an area of 32.28 square kilometres (12.46 sq mi) and as of 2011 had a population of 33,231.

== Education ==
Literacy rate: 50.6%

== Places of interest ==
- Shamshernagar Tea Garden
- Shamshernagar Slaughterhouse
- Shamshernagar Airport
- Shamshernagar Golf Course

== See also ==
- Upazilas of Bangladesh
- Districts of Bangladesh
- Divisions of Bangladesh
