= Ashraf Hussain =

Bengali writer (1892-1965)

Sahityaratna Munshi Ashraf Hussain Kavyavinod Puratattvavid
- আশরাফ হোসেন
- Born: Ashraf Hussain; 29 October 1892; Rahimpur, Kamalganj, Sylhet District, British Raj
- Died: 24 January 1965 (aged 72–73); Rahimpur, Kamalganj, Sylhet District, East Pakistan
- Occupation: Writer
- Writing career
- Language: Bengali
- Notable works: Ashraf Dewana, Dilkush Koinnar Baromashi, Maktabi Balyashikkha
- Notable awards: Tamgha-e-Quaid-e-Azam

Munshi Muhammad Ashraf Hussain (Bengali: মোহাম্মদ আশরাফ হোসেন; 1892-1965), was a Bengali poet, researcher and a collector of puthis and folk literature. He was also known for his contribution in the study of the Sylheti Nagri script.

== Early life ==
Ashraf Hussain was born in 1892 in the village of Rahimpur in Kamalganj Thana, Sylhet District, Assam Province, British India to a traditional Bengali Muslim family. His father, Jawad Ullah, was a munshi. Hussain started his education in a local maktab. After studying in a Qawmi madrasa for five years, he earned the title of munshi. He studied in Kaliprasad Middle English School, finishing in the third grade at 1915.

== Career ==
In 1918, he established and taught at a primary school, becoming the headmaster In 1922. He passed his teacher training examination in Silchar Normal School.

From 1918, Hussain also started writing for many magazines and newspapers about local issues. During this time, he grew an enthusiasm of folk literature. Dinesh Chandra Sen decided to include Hussain's Manipurer Ladai (or the Battle of Manipur) to his prominent work, the Eastern Bengal Ballads. Hussain presented a lot of his findings to the University of Dhaka, which would be used in the future for comparative studies. He also wrote a number of articles for renowned journals in Bengal. He also wrote a number of articles for renowned journals in Bengal.

Hussain wrote 12 books. These include Ashraf Dewana, Bhumikomper Kobita and Adam Khan Dewaner Geet. He has 30 works relating to folk literature and some include Dilkush Koinnar Baromashi, Shantikoinnar Baromashi, Lilair Baromashi and Madhumalar Geet. He has also composed 17 textbooks such as Maktabi Balyashikkha, Shahitya Shudha and Nobobidhan Dharapat. The Monthly Islah featured his Sylheter Itihas work.

== Recognition ==
In recognition of his contribution to Bengali literature, the Murshidabad Banga Sahitya Mandal awarded him in 1935 as a Puratattvavid. In 1943, the Assamese government employed and funded his works. The All-Bengal Literary Club awarded him with the titles of Sahityaratna and Kavyavinod in 1952. In 1965, the Pakistani government awarded him the Tamgha-e-Quaid-e-Azam. The Bangla Academy granted economic support to him.

== Death and legacy ==
Hussain died in his own village in Rahimpur on 24 January 1965. Hussain had presented many of his findings to the University of Dhaka, which would be used in the future for comparative studies. He also wrote a number of articles for renowned journals in Bengal. His 125th birth anniversary was commemorated at the Kendriya Muslim Sahitya Sangsad premises in 2017 and attracted quite a large audience.

== See also ==
- Asaddor Ali
