= Nagendra Chandra Shyam =

Indian lawyer and journalist (1890 - 1964)

- Born: 1890; Basudevpur, Sylhet district, British India
- Died: 26 June 1964 (aged 73–74)
- Spouse: Malti Shyam (b. 1919)
- Children: Manujendra Shyam (son)
- Parent: Navinchandra Shyam (father)

Nagendra Chandra Shyam (Bengali: নগেন্দ্রচন্দ্র শ্যাম; 1890 – 26 June 1964), also known by the alias Aniruddha Gupta (Bengali: অনিরুদ্ধ গুপ্ত), was a Bengali writer, lawyer and journalist based in Silchar. He was a pioneering exponent of Rabindra Sangeet in the 20th century Barak Valley, and a devoted steward in the preservation of Bengali literature and culture in the region.

== Early life and education ==
Shyam was born in 1890 to a Bengali (Sylheti) family in the village of Basudevpur in Munshibazar, Sylhet district, British India. He was raised by his father Navinchandra Shyam. He completed his Entrance examination in 1910, and then studied at the Murari Chand College founded by Raja Girish Chandra Roy. He passed his Intermediate of Arts from there and then went to Calcutta. He studied at the City College and then graduated with a Bachelor of Arts from the University of Calcutta.

== Career ==
He first practiced law for a short time in Moulvibazar and then in Silchar for a long time from 1922 AD, gaining great fame and establishment. He was a government lawyer for a short time. Although his main profession was law, Nagendra Chandra Shyam was the first person in Silchar to devote himself to journalism. In the thirties, he edited a popular Bengali monthly called 'Bhabisshat' (Future). He started editing the Bengali weekly magazine 'Surma' in 1936. At that time, the magazine gained popularity among the Sylheti Bengalis and other Bengalis of Assam and eastern Bengal. He also became known as the first journalist of Kamalganj thana. A Bengali literary group was formed by the Sylheti Bangla community in Silchar through his newspaper editing. Apart from this, he was also associated with the newspapers 'Prachyobarta' and 'Bortoman' for a long time. His well-thought-out articles on various subjects have been published in various newspapers and magazines. He was skilled in writing short stories, poems and satirical essays. He used the pseudonym "Aniruddha Gupta" at various times. As he was a fan of Rabindra, he also criticized Rabindra's literature in his study of Rabindra. His critical book on this subject is Roop O Ras. His other book is Rabindranath, Dharma O Samaj.

He took an active role in all the cultural activities of the Sylhet region, which is why he often faced adverse criticism from the Assamese. Despite this, he planned to organize dance and acting events with his wife Malati Devi, family members, friends, and sons. His wife Malati Shyam formed the Silchar Women's Welfare Association, a branch of the AIWC, in 1938 and so, under the management, the Sylheti-Bengali girls of Silchar performed publicly on stage for the first time. Nagendra Chandra founded the "Bani Parishad" in Silchar. He was the founder-principal of the Silchar Law College. He also became the president of the governing body of the local Gurucharan College and the Gandhi Memorial Fund. There were close links with various music academies, Surlok, Bangiya Sahitya Parishat (Bengali Literary Society) and various educational and cultural institutions.

He passed away on June 26, 1964. His son Manujendra Shyam was a cultural figure and a Rabindra enthusiast.
