= Tarani Debnath =

Tarani Debnath তরণী দেবনাথ
- Tarani Debnath
- Born: 1940; Brahmanbaria, Tippera, Bengal, British India
- Died: 19 May 1961 (aged 21); Silchar, Cachar, Assam, India
- Cause of death: Police firing
- Known for: Martyr in Bengali Language Movement of Barak Valley
- Parent: Jogendra Debnath

Tarani Debnath (1940 - 19 May 1961) (Bengali: তরণী দেবনাথ) was a Bengali who took part in the Bengali Language Movement in the Barak Valley in 1961 and became a martyr. On 19 May 1961, while participating in a satyagraha demanding the official status for Bengali language in Barak Valley, he was shot dead by the paramilitary forces.
