= Muhammad Nurul Haque =

Muhammad Nurul Haque was a Bangladeshi cultural activist, social worker, and a writer.

== Career ==
Haque started his own magazine, Abhizan, while still studying at Sylhet Government Aliya Madrasah. He was the founding Secretary of Sylhet Kendriya Muslim Sahitya Sangsad. He edited Al-Islah, the official magazine of Sylhet Kendriya Muslim Sahitya Sangsad, for 48 years. He was a Muslim Nationalist who support the Pakistan Movement. He organized the July 1947 Sylhet referendum that decided whether Sylhet would join the future state of Pakistan or India. He support the Bengali language movement and wrote in favor of making Bengali the State language of Pakistan. On 19 August 1963, he was awarded the Tamgha-i-Khidmat by the Government of Pakistan. In 1971, he support the Independence of Bangladesh following the outbreak of Bangladesh Liberation war and denounced his Tamgha-i-Khidmat award. Jatiya Grantha Kendra awarded him a gold medal for his contribution to Bengali literature. In 1986, he was given a Bangla Academy fellowship.

== Bibliography ==
- Sangbad-patra Sebai Sylheter Musalman (1969)
- Shesh Nabir Bani (1970)
- Alok Stambha (1980)
- Bigata yuger Adasha (1981)
- Hazrat Shaykh Jalal Mujarrader Shishygan (1982)

== Death ==
Haque died on 2 September 1987.
