= World Sylhet Convention =

World Sylhet Convention বিশ্ব সিলেট সম্মেলন
- Status: Active
- Genre: Cultural festival
- Country: worldwide
- Inaugurated: 2014
- Most recent: 2020
- Organizer: Jalalabad Association

The World Sylhet Convention (Bishsho Silet Shommelon) is an annual cultural convection by the Sylhetis residing in the United States, Canada, United Kingdom, Japan, India, Bangladesh and other places. The conference is a symposium of the culture of Sylhet, focusing on the region's food, traditions, language, dance, music, talent and success stories. The contribution of Sylhet to the development of Bangladesh is also presented. The main theme of this convention is to unite Sylhetis from all over the world and connecting them generation to generation. The main program is classified into many events such as traditional Dhamail dance, Manipuri dance, drama, semenner on different topics and so on. Besides cultural events and semenner, the cuisine of Sylhet and various items of clothing including traditional Manipuri weaving in Sylhet is also featured.

== History ==
The Sylheti people had been organizing a social development program and conference called 'Sylhet Convention’' until the partition of India-Pakistan in 1947 to preserve the heritage and culture. Following its roote, the South Kolkata Sylhet Association started a program called Sylhet Festival in the 2010s in Kolkata. Jalalabad Association, Dhaka organized the first International Sylhet Festival in 2014 to strengthen the relations between the residents of Sylhet region living in different countries of the world. International Sylhet Festival was held in Dhaka and Sylhet on a grand stage organized by the Jalalabad Association Dhaka in 2017. In continuation, the World Sylhet Convention was held in New York City next year by the Jalalabad Association of America. A three-day World Sylhet Festival was held in Kolkata in 2019 in the continuation of New York and Toronto convention.

== Venues ==
The World Sylhet Conference is a forum for Sylheti speakers without boundaries.

- 2025: World Sylhet Convention- Michigan
- 2019: World Sylhet Festival- Kolkata
- 2018: World Sylhet Convention- Toronto, Organized By Jalalabad Association of Toronto.
- 2017: World Sylhet Convention- New York City, organized by The Jalalabad Association of America.
- 2016: The International Sylhet Festival was held in Dhaka and Sylhet organized by the Jalalabad Association.
- 2014: International Sylhet Festival- Kolkata,

== See also ==
- Bangladeshi Canadians
- Bangladeshi Americans
- North American Bengali Conference
