= Kamala Bhattacharya =

Martyr of Bengali Language Movement

Kamala Bhattacharjee
- Kamala Bhattacharjee
- Born: 1945; Sylhet, Assam, British India
- Died: May 19, 1961 (aged 16); Silchar, Cachar, Assam, India

Kamala Bhattacharjee was an Indian student who was martyred in the Bengali Language Movement in Silchar in 1961. She is the first female language martyr in the history of the world for her mother tongue.

== Early life ==
Kamala was born to Ramraman Bhattacharjee and Suprabasini Devi, the fifth of seven children in the year 1945 in the erstwhile Sylhet district in Assam. In their family they were three sons and four daughters. She was the third of the four daughters, having a younger sister and a younger brother. Their family had to struggle through many hardships after she lost her father early in her childhood. During the Partition of India, the district of Sylhet was acceded to Pakistan on the basis of Sylhet referendum. In the 1950 East Pakistan genocide, hundreds of Hindus were killed in Sylhet and they migrated to India in large numbers. Kamala's mother too migrated to Silchar in the Cachar district in the year 1950.

Kamala's family used to stay in a rented accommodation in Silchar Public School Road. Her eldest sister Benu took up a nursing job and went to Simaluguri for training. Kamala's elder sister Pratibha was a school teacher. Her family was economically dependent on her earning for their livelihood. In her childhood, Kamala attended the Chhotelal Seth Institute in Silchar. She did not have the financial stability to buy the school text books. She had once asked her eldest sister Benu to buy her a dictionary for her, which her sister could not afford. She used to borrow books from her classmates and copy the text and read them. In 1961, Kamala appeared for the matriculation exams. She was determined to complete her graduation and had planned to learn typewriting before the matriculation results were declared.

== Martyrdom ==
The very next day after the matriculation exams, a picketing was being organized in Silchar railway station demanding Bengali as the medium of education. On the morning of May 19, after taking a bath, Kamala wore the saree of her elder sister Pratibha and prepared to go to picketing. Her elder sister warned her of possible dangers. In the meanwhile, a group of 20-22 girls came to their house to take her. They alleviated her mother's concerns and took Kamala along with them. Kamala's mother gave her a piece of cloth to defend herself from tear gas. Kamala's younger sister Mangala, youngest brother Bakul Chandra Bhattacharjee and her nephew Bappa too accompanied the group. Later during the day, Kamala's mother herself went to the railway station to enquire about their whereabouts. Bakul and Bappa had once been arrested by the police and then released. Kamala washed her mother's feet of the dust, gave her a sharbat and then sent her back home.

The rail blockade programme had passed off peacefully in the morning. In the afternoon, the Assam Rifles had begun to arrive at the railway station. At around 2-35 P.M. the paramilitary police started beating the protesters with rifle butts and batons without any provocation from them. Kamala's younger sister hit by the police . The police had opened fire on the protesters by then. As Kamala tried to raise up, with the slogan in her mouth, Jaan Dabo tobuo joban dabo na, a bullet pierced through her eye and hit her head. Kamala was taken to hospital along with other wounded and bullet hit protesters. She immediately fell on the ground and was succumbed to death . Kamalas youngest brother ' Bakul ' witnessed the whole incident from distant far which he could never forget till his last breath.

== Memorial ==
In 2011, Gopa Dutta Aich unveiled a bronze bust of Kamala Bhattacharjee in the premises of the Chhotelal Seth Institute under the aegis of Shahid Kamala Bhattacharjee Murti Sthapan Committee.

== See also ==
- Sachindra Chandra Pal
