= Sachindra Chandra Pal =

- Sachindra Chandra Pal
- Born: 1942; Habiganj Greater Sylhet, Assam, British India
- Died: 19 May 1961 (aged 19); Silchar, Cachar, Assam, India
- Occupation: Student
- Parent: Gopesh Chandra Pal

Sachindra Chandra Pal (1942 - 19 May 1961) was an Indian student who took part in the Bengali Language Movement in Silchar. He was killed on 19 May 1961. Sachindra Paul Road in Silchar is named in his memory.

== Early life ==
Sachindra Chandra Pal was born in a Bengali Kayastha family, in the village of Madanpur, under Nabiganj police station in the Habiganj sub-division of the undivided Sylhet district in 1942, to Gopesh Chandra Pal. He was the second son among six sons and one daughter. During the Partition, their family migrated to Silchar and settled in the town. Sachindra attended Cachar High School in Silchar and appeared for the secondary examinations in 1961.

== Martyrdom ==
The day after the matriculation exams, a satyagraha was organized at the Tarapur railway station in Silchar demanding Bengali as the medium of education. Sachindra joined the satyagraha. The rail blockade programme passed peacefully in the morning. In the afternoon at around 2:30 PM, a truck carrying arrested satyagrahis were passing by, when suddenly it was set on fire. When the satyagrahis protested, the military personnel posted at the site started firing indiscriminately, killing Sachindra.

== See also ==
- Kamala Bhattacharya
- Birendra Sutradhar
