= Asoke Bijay Raha =

Indian poet, academic, essayist and critic (1910 - 1990)

Asoke Bijoy Raha
- Born: 14 November 1910; Dhakadakshin, Sylhet District
- Died: November 19, 1990 (aged 80); Shantiniketan, West Bengal
- Education: Murari Chand College; University of Calcutta

Professor Asoke Bijay Raha (14 November 1910 – 19 October 1990) was an Indian Bengali poet, academic, essayist and critic. He served as a Professor of Rabindra Sangeet for a long time at the Visva-Bharati University in Shantiniketan.

== Early life and education ==
Asoke Bijay Raha was born on 14 November 1910 to a Bengali (Sylheti) family in the village of Dhakadakshin in Sylhet District, Bengal Presidency. He was the youngest among the four sons and one daughter of Bankabihari Raha and Brahmamayi Devi. He spent his childhood in the tea gardens of Cachar district. When he grew a little bit older, he was then taken by his paternal uncle to Sylhet town to join the English school. After that, he passed his Intermediate of Arts from Murari Chand College in 1931. He then went to the University of Calcutta where he completed his Bachelor of Arts with Honours, and in 1947, he completed his Master of Arts in Bengali literature from Calcutta University as well.

== Career ==
In 1931, Raha completed his Bachelor of Arts with Honours and returned to Sylhet and Karimganj where he taught in numerous schools. In 1946, the Karimganj College was founded and he taught there up until 1951. After that, he joined the faculty at Visva-Bharati University in Shantiniketan, West Bengal. He was the professor of Rabindra Sangeet for forty years and retired in 1974. He was also the principal of Rabindra Bhaban.

In his childhood, Raha was fond of rhymes, yet during his early school years he grew disenchanted with poetry, finding the poems in textbooks stiff and lifeless. Nurtured amid forests and nature, he was instead drawn to prose. Gradually, however, the works of the rural poet Satyendranath Dutta like Phooler Fasal and the poetry of Nobel Laureate Sir Rabindranath Tagore FRAS rekindled his love for verse.

While studying for his Intermediate of Arts at Murari Chand College, Raha began writing poems himself. His first poem was published in Kamala, a magazine from Sylhet town. In 1932, a classmate sent a collection of his poems to Nobel Laureate Sir Rabindranath Tagore FRAS, who read them with interest, added his comments, and blessed the young poet by affectionately calling him “Tarun Chand,” or the young moon.

"আকাশে চেয়ে আলোকবর

মাগিল যবে তরুণ চাঁদ

রবির কর শীতল হয়ে

করিল তারে আশীর্বাদ।"

“When the Tarun Chand (young moon), looking toward the sky, asked for a boon of light, Rabi (the sun), its rays becoming cool, gave him his blessings.”

In 1941, Raha published his first poetry collection, Dihang Nadir Banke (On the Bend of the Dihang River), followed by Rudra Basanta. In 1942, his poem Bhanumotir Math (Bhanumoti’s Field) appeared in Buddhadeva Bose’s Ek Poyshar Series. The collection received high praise in Shanibarer Chithi, edited by Sajanikanta Das.

Most of Raha’s poems are rich in imagery, drawing inspiration from rivers, mountains, and the wilderness. Brevity combined with vivid, colorful description became a hallmark of his poetic style.

His published poetry collections include —

- Dihang Nadir Banke (1941)
- Rudra Basanta (1941)
- Bhanu Matir Math (1942)
- Jaldambur Pahar (1945)
- Urochithir Jhank (1951)
- Jetha Ei Chaitrer Shalban (1961)
- Ghanta Baje (1981)
- Parda Sare Jay (1981)
- Paush Fasal (1983)

In addition, nearly fifty of his poems have been translated into Hindi, English, French, and Spanish, and published in various journals both in Bengal and abroad. Professor Asoke Bijoy Raha was also a reflective essayist and a distinguished critic. The following works belong to that phase of his literary career:

- Jibananander Jagat (Jibanananda's World)
- Rabindranather Jibandebata
- Geetikabye Rabindra Pratibhar Baishistya
- Patrashtak
- Banishilpi Abanindranath

Professor-poet Asoke Bijoy Raha travelled widely across India, engaging in various artistic and cultural activities. In 1966, as a representative of Visva-Bharati University, he visited the then Russian Soviet Federative Socialist Republic at the invitation of the Soviet Land Nehru Award Committee, where he delivered a lecture on “Rabindranath and Internationalism.”

== Death ==
After retiring from Visva-Bharati University, Raha spent his later years at “Suraha,” the residence he built in Purvapalli, Shantiniketan, Birbhum district. There, on October 19, 1990, Professor Asoke Bijoy Raha passed away.
