= Kamalganj Upazila =

Kamalganj কমলগঞ্জ
- Upazila
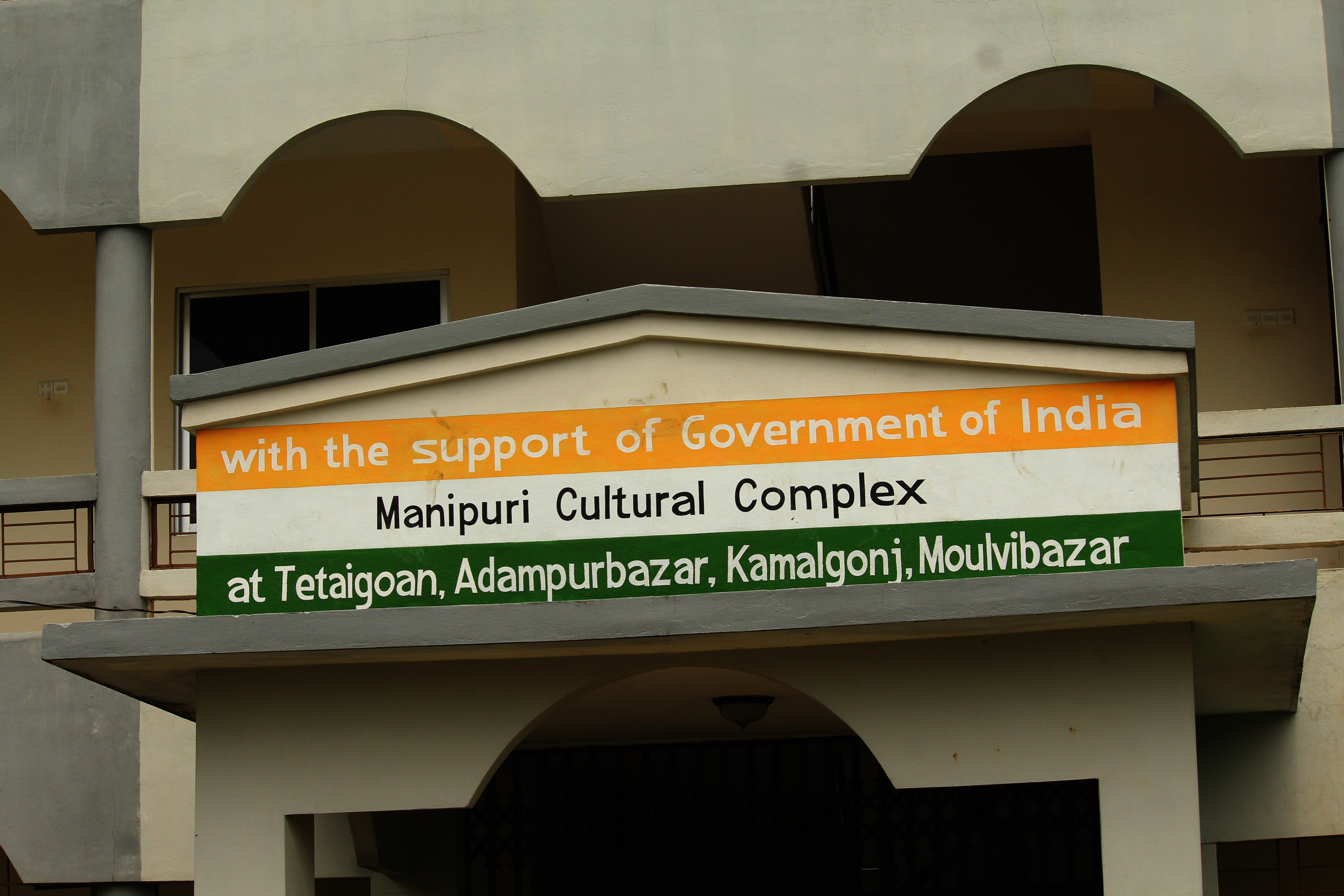
- Manipur Cultural Complex, Kamalgani upazila

- Country: Bangladesh
- Division: Sylhet
- District: Moulvibazar

Government
  - MP (Moulvibazar-4): Vacant
  - Upazila Chairman: Vacant

Area
  - Total: 485.26 km^{2} (187.36 sq mi)

Population (2022)
  - Total: 290,108
  - Density: 597.84/km^{2} (1,548.4/sq mi)
- Demonyms: Kamalganji, Komolgonji, Khomolgoinji
- Website: https://kamolganj.moulvibazar.gov.bd/

Kamalganj Upazila mauza geocode map

Kamalganj (Bengali: কমলগঞ্জ) is an upazila (sub-district) of Moulvibazar District in the Division of Sylhet, Bangladesh.

== Etymology ==
There was a local zamindar by the name of Kinkar Nath Ray who appointed a naib by the name of Kamal Narayan in order to develop the land. Kamal established a ganj (treasured neighbourhood) named after himself. In 1922, Kamalganj was made a thana and in 1983, an upazila.

== History ==
Kamalganj was a part of the ancient Ita Kingdom founded by Raja Bhanu Narayan. The final raja of the Ita Kingdom, Raja Subid Narayan lost a battle in 1610 in which the region became under the rule of Khwaja Usman. However, this rule was short-lived after Mughal General Islam Khan I's attack in 1612. The battle between the Mughal Empire and Khwaja Usman was held in Patanushar, Kamalganj. This led to the death of Afghan leader Khwaja Usman.

A peasant rebellion (krishokproja bidraho) against zamindar of Prithimpasa led by Manipuri leader Panchanan Singh, Baikunthanath Sharma, Themba Singh and Qasim Ali was held in the 1900s in Bhanubil, Kamalganj.

== Demographics ==
According to the 2022 Bangladeshi census, Kamalganj Upazila had 63,936 households and a population of 290,108. 9.19% of the population were under 5 years of age. Kamalganj had a literacy rate (age 7 and over) of 74.88%: 77.60% for males and 72.35% for females, and a sex ratio of 94.49 males for every 100 females. 39,791 (13.72%) lived in urban areas.

According to the 2011 Census of Bangladesh, Kamalganj Upazila had 51,895 households and a population of 259,130. 62,862 (24.26%) were under 10 years of age. Kamalganj had a literacy rate (age 7 and over) of 48.61%, compared to the national average of 51.8%, and a sex ratio of 1028 females per 1000 males. 30,197 (11.65%) lived in urban areas. Ethnic population was 23,134 (8.93%), of which Manipuri were 15,672, Khasi 1046 and Santal 916.

As of the 1991 Bangladesh census, Kamalganj has a population of 191,672. Males constitute 50.98% of the population, and females 49.02%. This Upazila's eighteen up population is 102,877. Kamalganj has an average literacy rate of 28.6% (7+ years), compared to the national average of 32.4%.

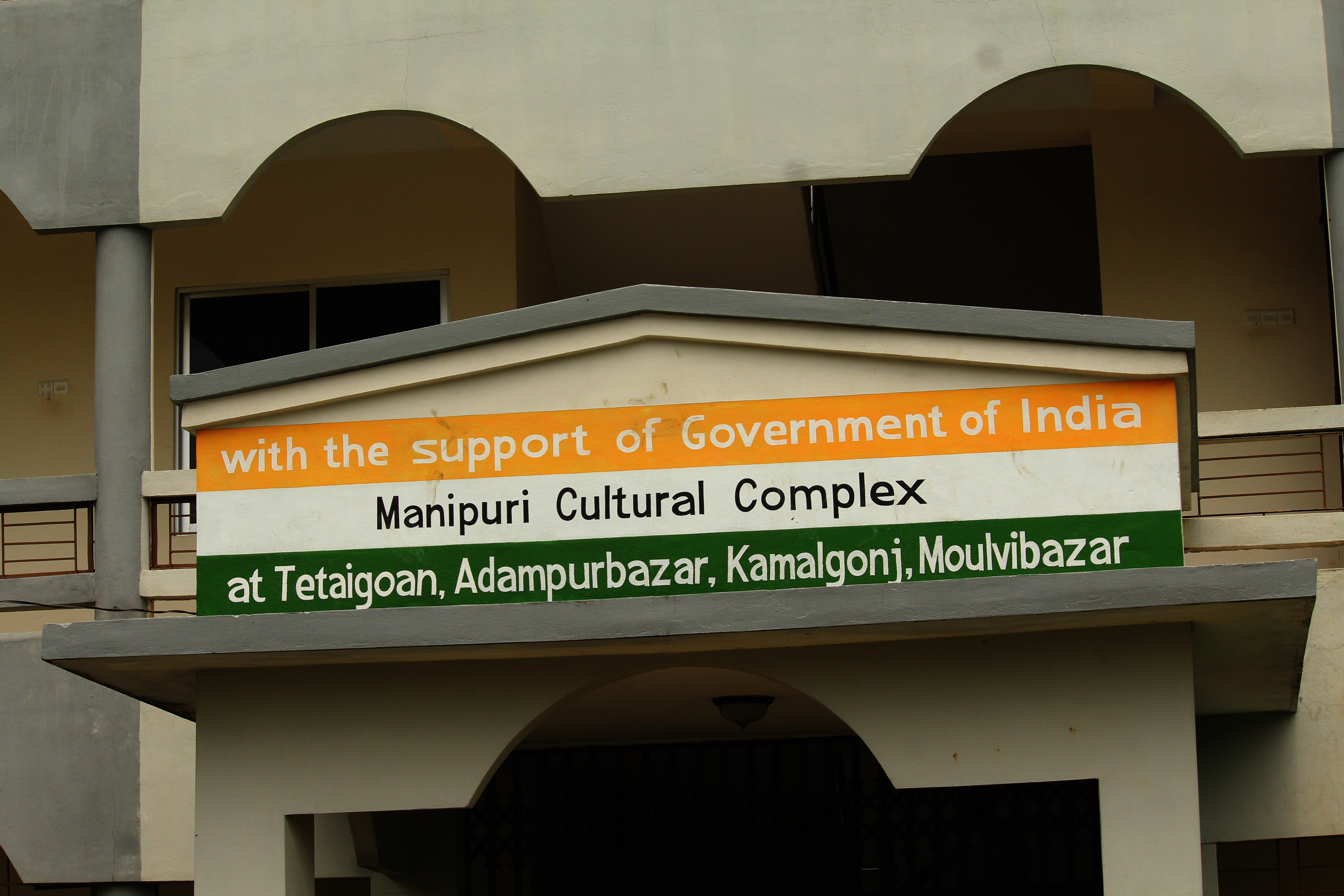
Manipuri Cultural Complex in Kamalganj

Majority of the residents are Bengalis although there is a minority of indigenous peoples such as the Khasi, Manipuris, Bishnupriya Manipuris, Tripuris and Garos.

=== Ethnicity and religion ===
Religions in Kamalganj Upazila (2022)
Religion	Percent
Islam	68.77%
Hinduism	30.22%
Christianity	0.81%
Other or not stated	0.20%

Population by religion in Union/Paurashava
Upazila	Muslim	Hindu	Others
Kamalganj Paurashava	16,931	2,475	2,927
Adampur Union	24,972	4,057	464
Alinagar Union	19,785	11,189	306
Islampur Union	19,944	9,659	903
Kamalganj Union	19,063	4,413	238
Madhabpur Union	11,446	19,274	751
Munsi Bazar Union	12,178	6,762	1
Patanushar Union	22,661	2,759	2
Rahimpur Union	26314	15135	118
Shamsernagar Union	26205	11,944	115

🟩 Muslim majority 🟧 Hindu majority

Population of upazila by ethnicity (2022)
1. Bengali (90.2%)
2. Manipuri (5.41%)
3. Others (4.37%)

Bengali Muslims are the majority but there is a large Bengali Hindu minority. Ethnic population is 28,383 (9.78%) of which Manipuri are 15708.

== Economy and tourism ==
Kamalganj is home to many tourist attractions and natural geography. It contains many tea gardens. Almost around there are fourteen (14) tea garden here.Kamalganj is mainly famous for its natural beauty. This natural place has many tourist spots viz the Lawachara National Park, Madhabpur Lake, Bir Shrestho Hamidur Rahman Monument, Hum Hum Waterfall (Rajkandi Reserve Forest), Grand Sultan Tea Resort & Golf, Camillia Lake, Noor Jahan Tea Garden Other sites include the mausoleums of Shah Kala in Bhadair-Deul (near Shamshernagar Rail Station), Shah Ghayb (north of Bhanugach Rail Station) and Shah Ghazi Malik in Bhadair-Deul. The ruins of the Ita Kingdom can be found across Kamalganj. The forts of Khwaja Usman, his grave and false tomb can be found in Patanushar in the areas of Srisurya and Usmangarh.

== Administration ==
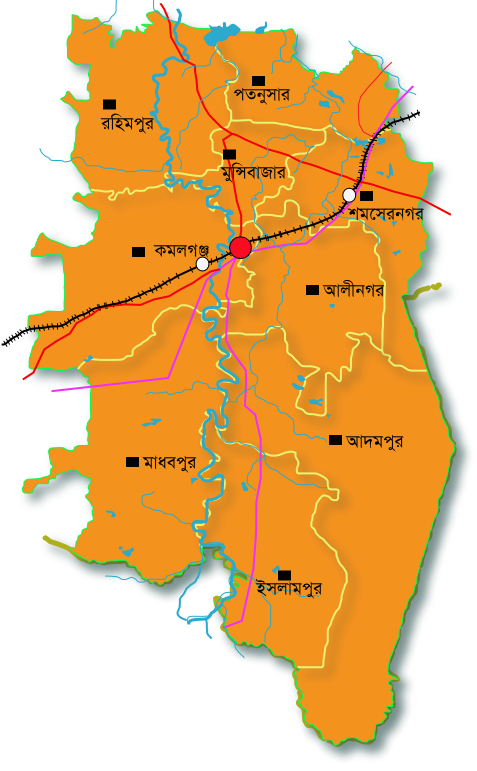
Unions of Kamalganj Upazila

Kamalganj Upazila is divided into Kamalganj Municipality and 9 union parishads: Adampur, Ali Nagar, Islampur, Kamalganj, Madhabpur, Munshi Bazar, Patanushar, Rahimpur, and Shamshernagar. The union parishads are subdivided into 116 mauzas and 253 villages.

Kamalganj Municipality is subdivided into 9 wards and 27 mahallas.

== Notable residents ==
- Chowdhury Gulam Akbar, writer, was born in Dargahpur village in 1921.
- Mohammad Keramat Ali, former Member of the Pakistan National Assembly
- Surendra Kumar Sinha, 21st Chief Justice of Bangladesh
- Ashraf Hussain, poet, writer, researcher
- Gita Rani Kanu, trade unionist.
- Khwaja Usman, Mughal opponent and Baro-Bhuyan chieftain

== Gallery ==
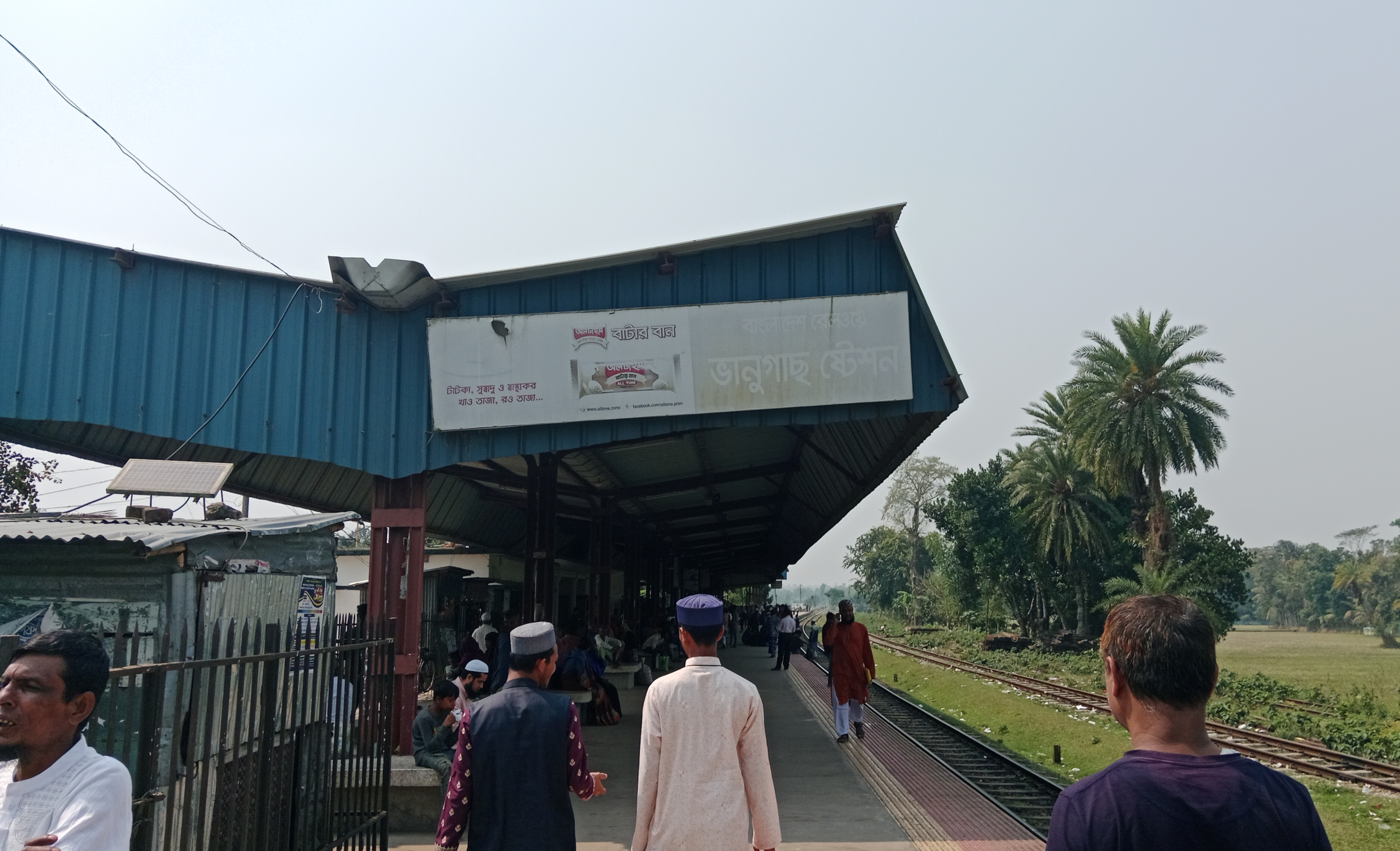
Bhanugach railway station

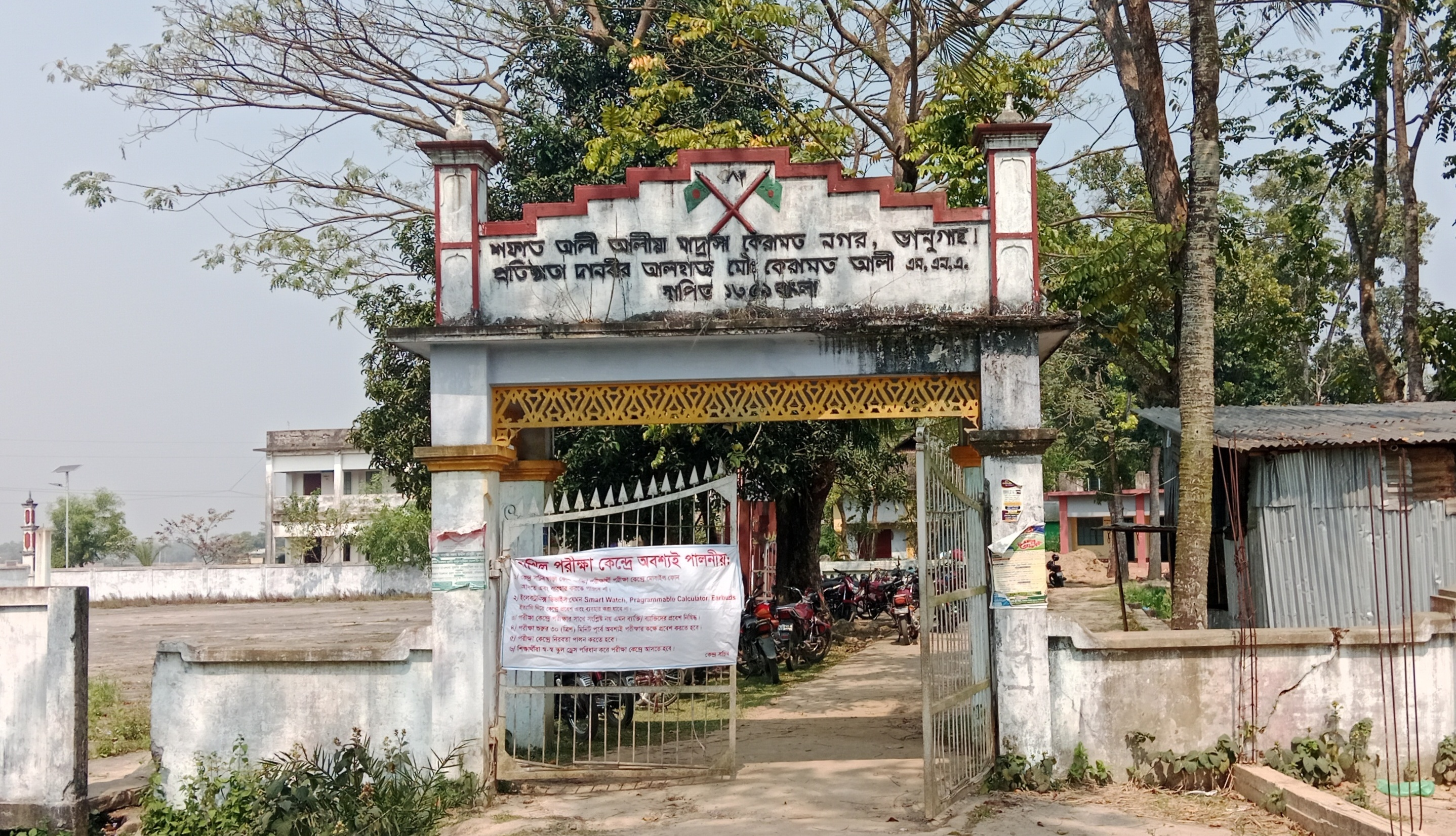
Safat Ali Senior Fazil Madrasah, Keramatnagar

== See also ==
- Upazilas of Bangladesh
- Districts of Bangladesh
- Divisions of Bangladesh
