= Bengali Language Movement (Barak Valley) =

Protest against Assamese as the sole official language

Barak Valley Language Movement
- Part of Bengali language movements in India
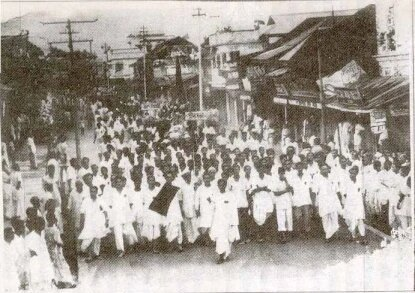
- The condolence procession in Silchar on 20 May 1961 in memory of the deceased language martyrs in results of lathicharge on 19 May 1961
- Date: 1960 – 1961
- Location: Barak Valley, Assam; 24.82°N 92.81°E
- Caused by: Assamese imposition
- Goals: Bengali nationalism
- Methods: Protests, sit-ins, demonstrations
- Result: Bengali become the regional official language
- Location of the movement

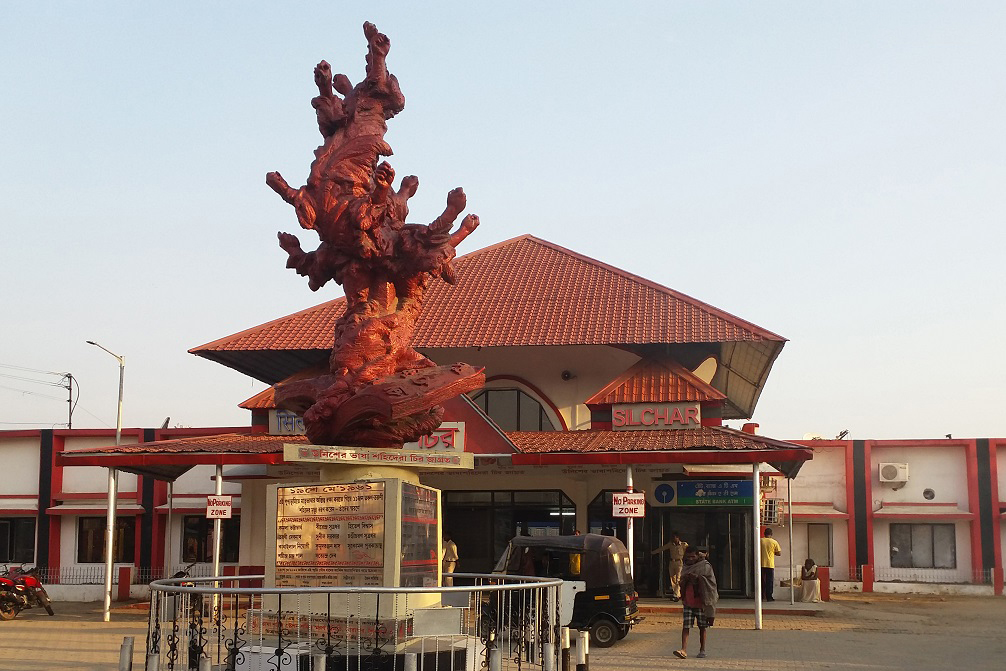
A memorial built in memory of language martyrs

The Bengali Language Movement of Barak Valley was a period of protests that began in 1960 against the decision of the Government of Assam to make Assamese the state's sole official language, even though most Barak Valley residents spoke Bengali. About 80% of the valley's residents are ethnic Bengalis, and the Bengali population in the Barak Valley region consists of both Hindus and Muslims in about equal numbers, constituting the overwhelming majority of the population. There is also a substantial minority of native tribes and immigrants from other parts of India.

The main incident took place on 19 May 1961 at Silchar railway station, in which the Assam Police killed 11 ethnic Bengalis.

== Background ==
Languages spoken in Barak Valley (administratively the erstwhile Cachar district), 1951-1961 Census

The Barak Valley, forming the major part of the erstwhile Cachar district in undivided Assam, though predominantly Hindu (59.6%) and Muslim (39.13%), was overwhelmingly Bengali-speaking (78.73%), followed by Hindi (10.33%), while Assamese was spoken by only a small minority (0.33%). After independence, the growth of Assamese linguistic nationalism in the Brahmaputra Valley was reflected in political initiatives to establish Assamese as the sole official language of the state, extending to the Bengali-speaking Barak Valley. The issue took a decisive turn in 1960 when a proposal was introduced to formalise Assamese as the state's only official language.

In April 1960, a proposal was raised at the Assam Pradesh Congress Committee to declare Assamese as the state's sole official language. On 10 October 1960, Bimala Prasad Chaliha, the then Chief Minister of Assam, presented a bill in the Legislative Assembly that sought to legalize Assamese as the sole official language of the state. Ranendra Mohan Das, the legislator from the Karimganj (North) assembly constituency and an ethnic Bengali, protested against the bill on the grounds that it sought to impose the language of a third of the population over the other two-thirds. On 24 October, the bill was passed in the Assam Legislative Assembly, making Assamese the state's only official language.

== The movement ==
=== Protest ===
On 5 February 1961, the Cachar Gana Sangram Parishad was formed to protest the imposition of Assamese in the Bengali-speaking Barak Valley. On 14 April, the people of Silchar, Karimganj, and Hailakandi observed a Sankalpa Divas in protest against the injustice of the Assamese government. On 24 April, the Parishad left for a two-week padayatra in the Barak Valley, in the regions surrounding Silchar and Karimganj, to raise awareness among the populace. The Satyagrahis, who took part in the padayatra, walked over 200 miles and covered several villages. The procession ended on 2 May in Silchar. Later on, a similar padayatra was organized in Hailakandi. After the padayatra, Rathindranath Sen, the Parishad leader, declared that if Bengali was not accorded the status of official language by 13 April 1961, a complete work stoppage (called a hartal) would be observed on 19 May from dawn to dusk. The Parishad also called for due recognition of the languages of other linguistic minorities.

On 12 May, the soldiers of the Assam Rifles, the Madras Regiment, and the Central Reserve Police staged a flag march in Silchar. On 18 May, the Assam police arrested three prominent leaders of the movement, namely Nalinikanta Das, Rathindranath Sen, and Bidhubhushan Chowdhury, the editor of the weekly Yugashakti.

=== Main incident of 19 May ===
Assam police resort to lathi charge on the satyagrahis at the Tarapur railway station (now Silchar railway station).

On 19 May, the dawn-to-dusk hartal began. Picketing started early in the morning in the sub-divisional towns of Silchar, Karimganj, and Hailakandi. In Karimganj, the agitators picketed in front of government offices, courts, and railway stations. In Silchar, the agitators picketed in the railway station. The last train from Silchar was around 4 p.m., after which the hartal would be effectively dissolved. Not a single ticket was sold for the first train at 5:40 a.m. The morning passed peacefully without incident. However, in the afternoon, the Assam Rifles arrived at the railway station.

At around 2:30 p.m., a Bedford truck carrying nine arrested Satyagrahis from Katigorah was passing by the Tarapur railway station (present-day Silchar railway station). Seeing their fellow activists arrested and being taken away, the Satyagrahis assembled at the railway tracks and broke out in loud protests. At that point, the truck driver and the policemen escorting the arrested activists fled the scene. Immediately after they fled, an unidentified person set fire to the truck. A firefighting team rushed to the spot to bring the fire under control. Within five minutes, at around 2:35 p.m., the paramilitary forces guarding the railway station started beating the protesters with rifle butts and batons without provocation. Within a span of seven minutes, the paramilitary forces fired 17 rounds into the crowd. Several people were hit by bullets and were carried to hospitals. Nine people died that day. On 20 May, the people of Silchar defied curfew to make a procession for the martyrs' bodies in protest against the killings. Two more people were martyred the next day.

== Post-movement effect ==
After the incident, the Assam government had to withdraw, and Bengali was ultimately given official status in Barak Valley's three districts. Section 5 of Assam Act XVIII, 1961, safeguards the use of Bengali in the Cachar district. It states, "Without prejudice to the provisions contained in Section 3, the Bengali language shall be used for administrative and other official purposes up to and including district level".

== Legacy ==
Statue dedicated to martyrs of the Bengali Language movement of Barak Valley, located in Udharbond

In the movement, eleven people were martyred. They were Kanailal Niyogi, Chandicharan Sutradhar, Hitesh Biswas, Satyendra Deb, Kumud Ranjan Das, Sunil Sarkar, Tarani Debnath, Sachindra Chandra Pal, Birendra Sutradhar, Sukamal Purakayastha, and Kamala Bhattacharya. Nine people died on 19 May 1961, and two died later. In subsequent effect, Bijan Chakraborty was martyred on 17 August 1972, and Jaganmay Deb and Dibyendu Das on 1986.

Other than 11 martyrs of 19 May 1961, many protesters of the 1961 language movement were badly beaten by the armed forces with lathis and bayonets. Many received bullet wounds. At least 30 protesters were admitted to Silchar Civil Hospital, while others were released after first aid treatment. Of these 30 activists, some lived with pain and disfigurement from bullet wounds for the remainder of their lives.

This massacre is compared with the one in Bangladesh on 21 February 1952, when students demonstrating for recognition of their language, Bengali, as one of the two national languages of what was then Pakistan, were shot and killed by police in Dhaka, the capital of present-day Bangladesh.

Bhasha Shahid Divas is celebrated every year on 19 May to commemorate those 11 martyrs who sacrificed their lives for the sake of protecting the Bengali language. Various cultural programmes are conducted, rallies are held, and the busts of the martyrs are decorated with flower garlands.

The movement is also credited to Pradip Kumar Dutta, Krishna Kanta Biswas, Manik Miya Laskar, Nishitendra Narayan Thakur, Santosh Chandra Kirtoniya, Bhupendra Kumar Paul, Sita Dey, Monoranjan Sarkar, and Anjali Rani Deb for their organizations and literary support.

The first dictionary of Barak Valley Bengali, Barak Upatyakar Ancholik Bangla Bhashar Abhidhan, was published in 2005 by Jagannath Chakravarty after twenty-five years of independent fieldwork, and was dedicated to the eleven language martyrs.

=== Memorial ===
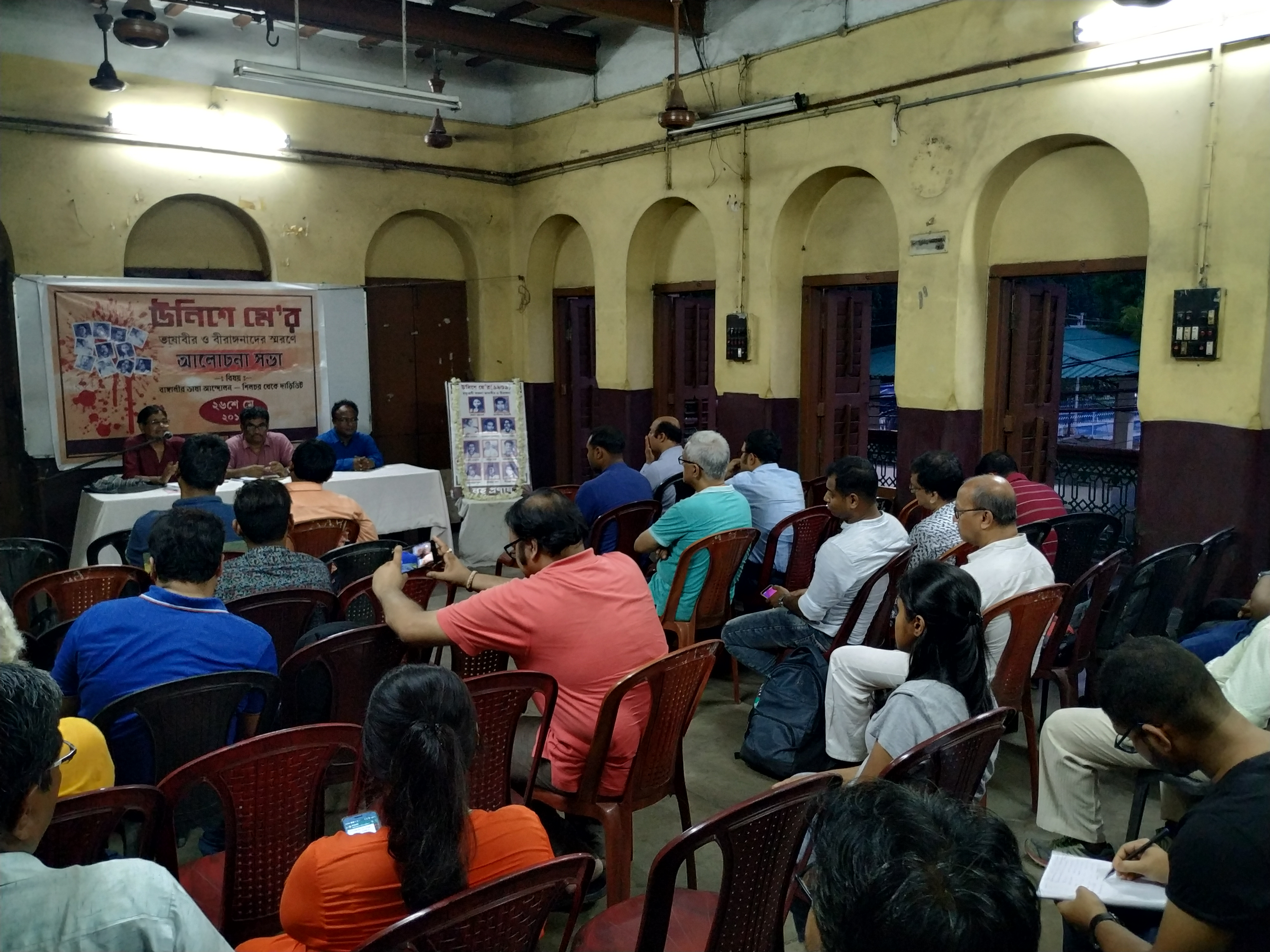
Dr. Mohit Ray, speaking at a commemorative event in Kolkata in 2019.

A martyr's tomb, known as the Shahid Minar, was erected in Silchar in memory of the martyrs. This stone tomb contains the ashes of the brave individuals who chose death for their right to get formal education in their mother tongue in their free country. In 2011, Gopa Dutta Aich unveiled a bronze bust of Kamala Bhattacharya on the premises of the Chhotelal Seth Institute under the initiative of the Shahid Kamala Bhattacharya Murti Sthapan Committee.

== Contemporary issues ==
The Assam government had, on 30 November 2013, issued a circular asking the deputy commissioners of all the state's districts to ensure the use of Assamese as an official language, which generated a lot of protests in the three Barak Valley districts—Cachar, Karimganj, and Hailakandi. However, Section 5 of the Assam Official Language Act of 1960, as amended in 1967, had specified Bengali as the official language. This prompted the state government to issue a fresh circular on 9 September saying that Bengali, the official language of Barak Valley, will continue to be used for all official works.

== See also ==
- Bengali language movement in India
- Bengali language movement in Bangladesh
