= Folk deities of Sylhet =

Hindi gods in Bangladesh and India

The folk deities of Sylhet are the various devas and devis that were traditionally worshipped by the syncretist societies in Bangladesh's northeastern Sylhet Division and the neighbouring Barak Valley in India.

== List of folk deities ==
The folk deities of undivided Sylhet region generally refer to the following seven devas and devis:

=== Rupasi Devi ===
Ruposhi Devi has many similarities with the Shastric deity Shashthi Devi and Subachani Devi. This goddess is associated with auspicious activities such as marriage, women's fertility, childbirth, and child-rearing. The Sheora tree (locally known as Ruposhi tree in Sylheti Bangla dialect) is considered the abode of the goddess. Before a marriage, or after a month has passed following the birth of a child, during a fasting day or before the child's Mukho Bhat eating rice ceremony, Sylhetis set a branch of the Ruposhi tree at the base of this tree or with a banana tree stem in a special vessel (locally called Bherua) and offer prayers. Usually, married women observe the Ruposhi Puja fast, offering fruits and vegetarian food as offerings. In recent times, Brahmin priests have also began performing the puja of Ruposhi Devi. In West Bengal, this deity shares similarities with the worshiped deity "Buri Ma/Buri Thakurani/Buri Gosai."

=== Badshah ===
This powerful male deity is honored as the protector of Sylhet's forests, hills, marshes, and water bodies. His worship is widely practiced among lower-caste Hindus and rural Muslim communities in Sylhet. Specifically, before cutting down forests for collecting wood, bamboo, red soil, sand, etc., or before the fishing season, or even before starting to build a house, both communities offer shinni (a type of offering) to Badshah. Sometimes ganja (cannabis) and fish like "shoul" or "gojaar" are also offered. Sylhetis believe that by receiving the favor of this immensely powerful deity, one can gain unlimited wealth and power. No temples are built for Badshah, and the appearance of the deity is realized by placing Bhoga offerings at the base of ancient vanaspati forest trees (such as Banyan, Ashwattha, or Champak trees) by setting up Badshah's thana/peeth/maqam under it. The worship is not conducted by a Brahmin priest, and worshipers themselves offer raw cow milk, fruits, etc., at the designated place. Badshah is a regional form of the Hindu deity Bhairava.

=== Kalachand ===
This deity is the protector of rice fields, animals, and fruit gardens. He has no idol, and temples for him are very rare. Worship is usually performed under a tree where a stone is placed as his representation. Worship is done without a Brahmin priest. Raw cow milk and fruits are offered as naivedya. Kalachan or Khalasan is believed to be an altered form of the ancient non-Aryan version of Shiva.

=== Sannyasi Baba ===
Sannyasi Baba is a village guardian deity, and his worship is performed under a very old tree in a Sylheti village. The offerings include raw cow milk, fruits, etc. The worship is accompanied by chanting "Horinam Kirton" (the name of Lord Hari is chanted kirtana). A Brahmin priest is not necessary for this worship, and villagers perform the rituals themselves. Shonnashi Baba is also believed to be a modified form of Shiva.

=== Rakhal ===
Like Badshah, Rakhal also has associations with Sylhet's forests, jungles, hills, marshes, and water bodies. Rakhal has no physical form, and worship is done under massive ancient trees where offerings are made. Soaked paddy, raw cow milk, and raw onions are offered. The Sylheti fishing community organises Rakhal Puja at the beginning of the fishing season. This deity is highly respected by both Hindu and Muslim communities, and it is believed that his blessings lead to immense strength and wealth.

=== Dorai (Dohor Ai) Bishohori ===
This goddess is mainly worshiped by the Sylheti fishing community. Depicted as a four-armed naked figure in yellow, adorned with snake-made armlets, anklets, and other jewelry, and in a Notoraj pose standing on a tortoise, she is worshiped secretly under the guidance of a "Gurmir" (a kind of eunuch dancer). During the fishing season, prayers are offered to her to protect boats and their passengers from danger and to ensure a bountiful catch. It is believed that praying to her can fulfill wishes, protect children, and safeguard them from various fears. Dorai Bishahari is considered to be an ancient or evolved form of the serpent goddess Manasa.

=== Kula Devi ===
Kula Devi is worshiped for resolving disputed matters in Sylhet. A person will take a new bamboo "kula" (a type of container), put a drop of vermilion on it, and suspend it in the air with the help of a sharp iron knife. They then pray to Kula Devi using paan (betel leaves), supari (betel nut), and batasha (sweets). The direction the "kula" spins determines which side is victorious in the dispute.
