= Kendriya Muslim Sahitya Sangsad =

Literary organisation located in Sylhet, Bangladesh

Kendriya Muslim Sahitya Sangsad কেন্দ্রীয় মুসলিম সাহিত্য সংসদ
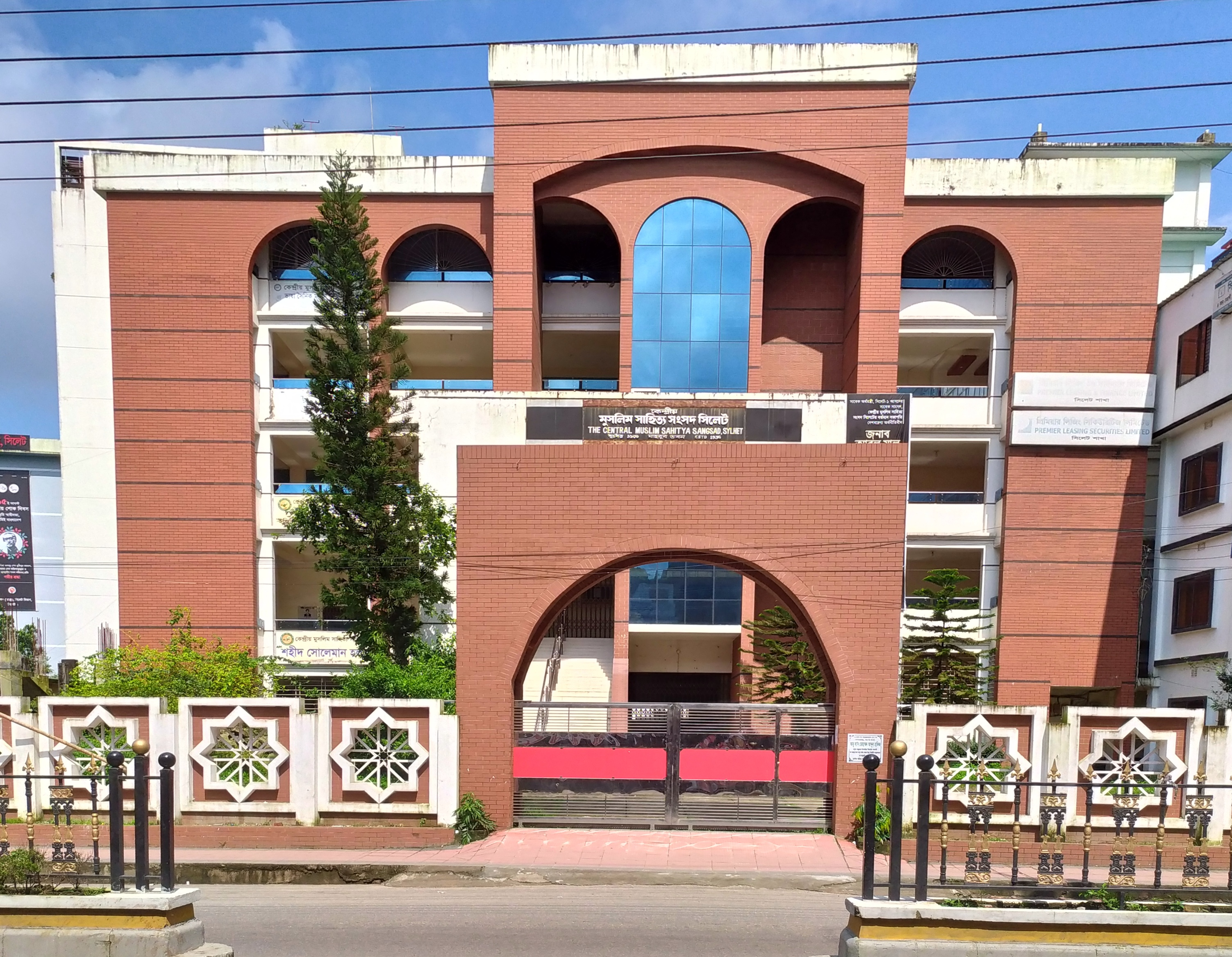
- 24.9018°N 91.8692°E
- Location: Dorgah gate, Sylhet, Bangladesh, Bangladesh
- Established: 1936

Kendriya Muslim Sahitya Sangsad (Bengali: কেন্দ্রীয় মুসলিম সাহিত্য সংসদ) (Sylhet Central Muslim Literary Society) is a literary organisation located in Sylhet, Bangladesh. It is one of the oldest organisations of its kind in South Asia and the oldest in Bangladesh. It was founded on 16 September 1936 by Muhammad Nurul Haque. It has the largest non-government collection of books, magazines, inscriptions etc. Some of them date back to the 13th century AD.

The former presidents of the organisation include many writers, critics and poets from Sylhet such as Syed Mujtaba Ali, Dewan Mohammad Azraf and Dilwar Khan.
