= Sylhet Gitika =

Collection of Sylhet folk tales

Sylhet Gitika (Sylheti: ꠍꠤꠟꠐ ꠉꠤꠔꠤꠇꠣ, Bengali: সিলেট গীতিকা, lit. 'Sylhet Ballads') is the folklore of Sylhet region including the oral narrative poetry, stories, fables, etc. The source of Sylhet Gitika is considered to be the daily lifestyle of the ancient people of Sylhet region, the livelihood of the indigenous people, feudal system of governance, rural folklore, emotional feelings, love-separation, war and humanity. According to the list given by Professor Asaddor Ali, 120 folk tales have been included in the Sylhet Gitika. The lyric poems collected by Chandra Kumar De from Mymensingh, Netrokona, Sylhet, Faridpur, Dhaka, Noakhali and Tripura with the efforts of Dr. Dinesh Chandra Sen, Ashutosh Chaudhury and many others were published gradually from Calcutta University as Purbabanga Gitika and Maimansingha Gitika. Besides, Chowdhury Gulam Akbar selected 10 lyric poems from Bangla Academy in 1986 and published them together as Sylhet Gitika.

== Lyrics included in the Sylhet Gitika ==
Name	Collected from
Chandra Raja	Azid Ali, 1964
Tilairaja	Ramiz Ullah, 1965
Kaludulai	Alam Ullah
Monibibi	Abdul Monnan, 1965
Rangmala	Azefor Ali, 1967
Suratjan Bibi	Lasumia, 1966
Alifzan Sundari	Abdul Malik, 1965
Dewana Modina	
Alal Dulal	
Adhua Sundori Churot Jamal	
Dewan Kotumia	
Dhonai Sadhu	Ashraf Hossain
Polok Jalua	Ashraf Hossain
Modhu Mala	Ashraf Hossain

== See also ==
- Bangladeshi folk literature
- Bengali literature
