= De (surname) =

Origin
- Origin: Bengali Hindu
- Region of origin: Bengal

De or Dey (Bengali: দে), is a native Bengali surname commonly used by the Bengali Hindu community of India and Bangladesh. The surname has been associated mainly with Bengali Kayasthas, but is also found among Suvarna Banik, Teli,Tili Barujibi, Kansari, Tambuli, Baishya Kapali, Tanti and some other castes of Bengal.

== Notable people with the surname ==
=== Academics ===
- Barun Dey (1932–2013), historian
- Bishnu Dey (1909–1982), poet
- Chandra Kumar De (1889–1946), Indian folklorist
- Harinath De (1877–1911), linguist
- Kanny Lall Dey (1831–1899), chemist
- Sambhu Nath De, (1915–1985), doctor
- Sushil Kumar De, Sanskritist
- Shobhaa De (1948), writer

=== Artists ===
- Manishi Dey (1906–1989), artist
- Mukul Dey (1895–1989), artist
- Rani Chanda (née Dey) (1912–1997), artist

=== Bar and the Bench ===
- Niren De, lawyer

=== Businessmen ===
- Ramdulal Dey (Sarkar) (1752–1825)

=== Civil Servants ===
- Brajendranath Dey (1852–1932), ICS officer

=== Films ===
- Deepankar De (1944), actor
- Esha Dey, Indian actress, performer, prominently works in Marathi theatre, films, web series, and TV serials.
- Gita Dey (1931–2011), actress
- Sreejita De (1989), actress
- Susan Dey (1952), actress

=== Journalists ===
- Lal Behari Dey (Mondal) (1824–1892), Indian journalist and author
- Jyotirmoy Dey (1955–2011), Indian journalist and author

=== Music ===
- K.C. Dey, (1893–1962), Singer
- Manna Dey (1919–2013), Indian singer
- Mohini Dey (1996), Bengali Indian bass player, singer and songwriter

=== Social Reformers ===
- Saroj Nalini Dutt (née Dey), M.B.E., (1887–1925), social worker

=== Politics ===
- Ratna De, Indian politician

=== Spiritual Leaders ===
- A. C. Bhaktivedanta Swami Prabhupada, born Abhay Charan De (1896–1977), spiritual teacher and founder of ISKCON

=== Sports ===
- Krishanu Dey (1962–2003), Indian football player

== See also ==
- Dey (disambiguation)
