= Aroti Dutt =

Indian social worker (1924–2003)

- Born: 23 September 1924; Calcutta, Bengal Presidency, British India
- Died: 6 May 2003 (aged 78); Calcutta, West Bengal, India
- Occupation: Social worker
- Spouse: Birendrasaday Dutt
- Children: Devsaday Dutt
- Parents: Satyendra Chandra Mitra (father); Uma Mitra (mother)

Aroti Dutt (1924–2003) was a social worker from India. She was the world president of the Associated Countrywomen of the World for two terms, from 1965 to 1971, and subsequently their Member of Honour. She was also the international vice-president of International Alliance of Women. In India, she was the president of the Saroj Nalini Dutt Memorial Association, an organisation dedicated to Women's work, from 1970 to 2003. She had worked in various capacities in that organisation since 1942. She also founded various other social welfare organisations in India and was associated with many others. She was a graduate of the University of Calcutta and had a Diploma in Social Welfare from the Institute of Social Studies of The Hague, The Netherlands.

== Background ==
Aroti Mitra was born on 23 September 1924 to Satyendra Chandra Mitra and Uma Mitra. She was their only child. Her father was a Freedom fighter and a politician. For a time her father was a member of the Central Legislative Assembly in New Delhi and was also jailed by the British Indian Government for his political activities against British Rule in India, and young Aroti spent her years of childhood travelling to many places in India, and was educated mainly at home. Eventually, when her father became President of the Bengal Legislative Council, Aroti graduated from the University of Calcutta, majoring in philosophy.

She married Birendrasaday Dutt, the only son of Gurusaday Dutt, ICS, in 1942. She used to say that she cannot claim any "inner call" that took her into social service and that she had married into it. Her father-in-law had founded Saroj Nalini Dutt Memorial Association in memory of his wife, a women's organisation dedicated to the welfare of women. The Dutt family are renowned for their work in the field of social welfare, so Aroti took to it soon after her marriage at the age of 18. Her only child, Devsaday, was born in 1948. Her grandsons are Rajsaday (born 1974) and Shivsaday (born 1978)

In 1958, she won a scholarship to do a Diploma in International Social Welfare at the Institute of Social Studies at The Hague, The Netherlands. She received her Diploma for her paper "Social Welfare Planning for low-income countries" in 1959.

== International social work ==
She became the area vice-president for Asia of the Associated Countrywomen of the World at their World Conference in Edinburgh in 1959, and was re-elected at the World Conference in Melbourne in 1962. She represented ACWW at the UNESCO Seminar on Adult Education in England, the UNESCO Seminar on Eradication of prejudice in Munich, the International Council of Women's Conferences in Istanbul and in Bangkok, UNESCO's NGO Conference in Paris, and their Board meetings at Addis Ababa, Bangkok, and Manila. She was invited by the director-general of FAO as a consultant for the planning of the Freedom from Hunger.

She was elected the World President of the Associated Countrywomen of the World at their World Conference at Dublin in 1965, and was re-elected unopposed in 1968.

In 1983, the Associated Countrywomen of the World elected her a "Member of Honour".

She was also a vice-president of the International Alliance of Women and was connected with World View International.

== Social work in India ==
=== Saroj Nalini Dutt Memorial Association ===
Saroj Nalini Dutt (Aroti's mother-in-law) was the one who started Mahila Samitis (Women's Institutes) in rural Bengal in 1916. After Saroj Nalini's death, her husband, Gurusaday Dutt, started the Saroj Nalini Dutt Memorial Association in her memory, to keep alive the valuable social welfare work that she did. The association is run by voluntary work by women.

Soon after her marriage in 1942, Aroti started working for this association and worked in various capacities until 1970, when she became the president and continued till her death in 2003. The concept of Mahila Samiti is based on the development of women–to make them literate and self-reliant by giving them a vocation, as well as assisting them with their health, nutrition, family, welfare, and childcare needs. Each Mahila Samiti has its own rules, while the association provides general supervision, assistance and guidance. During her tenure, she increased the number of basic organizational Mahila Samitis to 67.

The objectives of the association were increased to include –

- To educate women of low income group families, both in urban and rural areas;
- To arrange facilities for maternal and child healthcare and teach hygiene and principles of basic health and child care to rural and urban women;
- To teach Nutrition and Family Planning to improve the quality of life;
- To establish and run vocational training centres for improving the economic condition of women;
- To work for the welfare of children concerning their health, education and other career-building activities;
- To look after aged women, widows and deserted wives and;
- To train women as teachers to enable them to go back to their villages and be teachers there.

She also vastly expanded the association's activities to include an Industrial Training School, a Primary Teachers Training Institute, a Primary school, an Adult High School, Computer training facilities, a Production and "Kantha" centre (to enable the products of the students being sold directly by them), a Non-formal education and Literacy program, an Urban Family Welfare Centre, a Printing Press, a Family Counseling Centre, a "Save Sight" program on an ongoing basis, a Working Women's Hostel, two Old-Age Homes, a library, and a Mother and Baby Clinic. All these activities were Calcutta-centric.

But the activity that gave her the most satisfaction was starting a centralised Rural Training Centre – the Mirpur Training Centre in a village in Bengal, to promote literacy, income generation, health, nutrition, family planning, clean water and sanitation in 100 villages around Mirpur. In this, she received financial assistance from sister Associations within ACWW in Norway and Australia.

=== Other organisations ===
Aroti Dutt was

- the Founder President of the Countrywomen's Association of India;
- the Founder President of the Soroptomist International Club in Calcutta;
- the first National President of Soroptomist International of India; and
- Founder President of the Inner Wheel Club of India;

She had also been –

- Member of the Central Social Welfare Board 1978–80;
- Member of the West Bengal State Social Welfare Board since 1988;
- Chairman of the Family Planning Association for West Bengal;
- President & Trustee of the Bengal Bratachari Society;
- Vice-chairman, Gurusaday Dutt Folk Art Society, Gurusaday Museum;
- Patron of the National Indian Association of Women;
- President of the Sylhet Union.

besides serving on various Committees of the Central and State Governments.

== Literary contributions ==
She frequently wrote articles, both in Bengali and in English, for magazines in both India and abroad. During her lifetime, she published the following books:

- Brikhasakhaey Ek Raat (1977)–in Bengali;
- Bichitra Prithibi, Ajaanaa Manoosh (1985)–in Bengali;
- Over the Rainbow (1999)–in English;
- Jibaner Nana Diganta (2003)–in Bengali.
