= Gurusaday Museum =

Folk arts and crafts museum in Kolkata, India

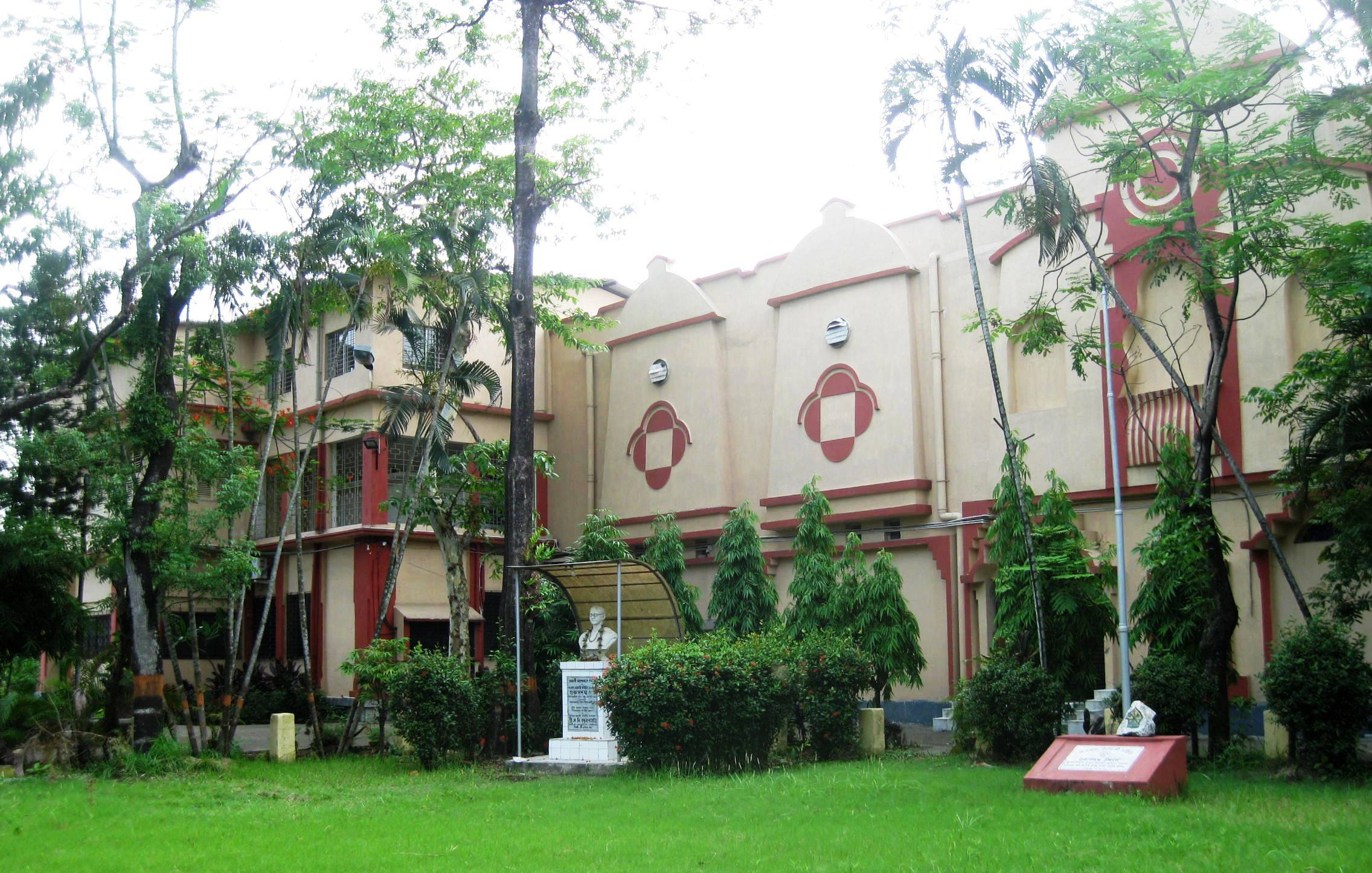
- Established: 1963; 63 years ago
- Location: P6, Diamond Harbour Rd, Diamond Park, Joka, Kolkata, West Bengal 700104
- Coordinates: 22°27′20″N 88°18′12″E
- Type: Ethnographic museum
- Founder: Gurusaday Dutt

The Gurusaday Museum is a folk arts and crafts museum located in Kolkata, India.

== History ==
The eminent Indian ICS officer and folklorist, Gurusaday Dutt collected over 3000 artifacts in the course of his entire career, spanning from 1905 to 1941. The bulk of the artifacts were collected between 1929 and 1939. Dutt has been referred to as, arguably, one of the foremost pioneers in the field of conservation of folk art and culture. The notable Bengali historian Nihar Ranjan Roy once commented: "Gurusaday Dutt had revealed the origin and flow of folk art and culture with the insight of an expert jeweller, who can easily identify a real stone".

After his death his belongings, especially the artifacts, were collected in an estate which was placed under the supervision of a trust of which the two original trustees were his brother-in-law, Major (Honorary) Basanta Kumar De, Commercial Traffic Manager (retired), of the BNR, who was the family nominee on the board of the trust and Shri Subimal Ray, Bar-at-law, formerly Judge of the Supreme Court of India, who was the legal adviser to the trust. Dutt's son, Birendrasaday Dutt, Esq., formerly of the Burma Shell, was also closely involved in the management of these artifacts. Based on the recommendations made by the two members of the trust and his son, the Bengal Bratachari Society founded the museum. Later, these artifacts were shifted to the newly established museum built in Joka, Kolkata. The museum building was formally opened in the presence of the then-chief minister of West Bengal, Dr. Bidhan Chandra Ray in 1961 and the galleries were opened in the presence of the education minister of India, Professor Humayun Kabir in 1963.

The museum was administered by Dutt's daughter-in-law, Aroti Dutt, who was its long-time chairperson. The historian, Barun De, was a family nominee on the board of the museum for several years. The museum is an autonomous body, which has been under the guidance of the Ministry of Textiles of the Government of India since 1984.

== Collections ==
Its collection includes archaeological objects, deities, manuscripts, masks, musical instruments, paintings, textiles and woodwork.

== Present status ==
In 2017, the central government stopped funding for the Gurusaday Museum and since then the museum had resorted to crowd-funding in order to sustain itself. The central government proposed to transfer all the artefacts present in the Gurusaday Museum to the Indian Museum. This decision which may have been taken independently of the staff at Gurusaday Museum was met with widespread criticism. As of December 2022, the museum has been temporarily closed to visitors.

== See also ==
- List of museums in West Bengal
