= Raibenshe =

Bengali folk dance

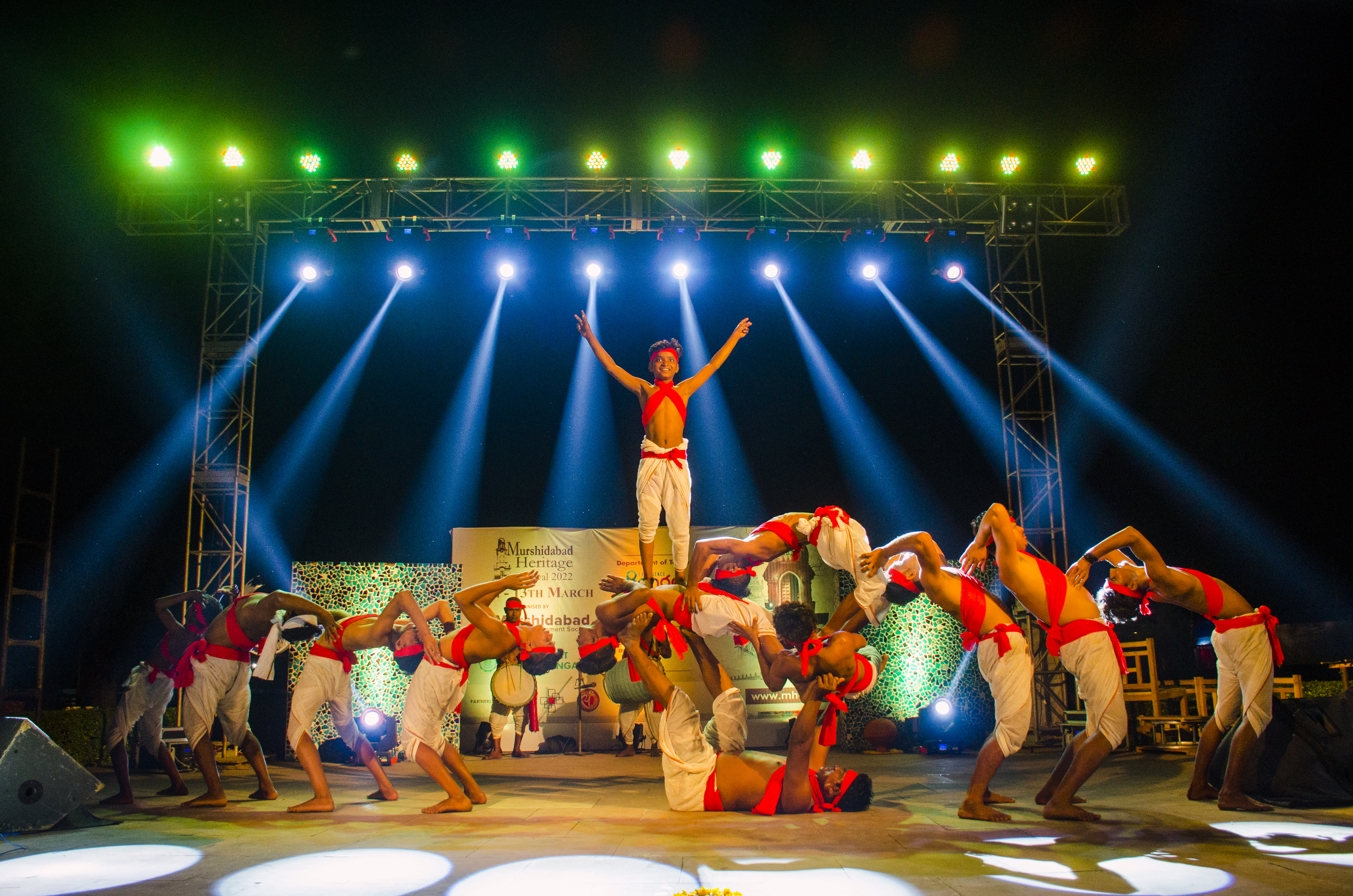
Raibenshe dance at Motijhil, Murshidabad during Murshidabad Heritage Festival 2023

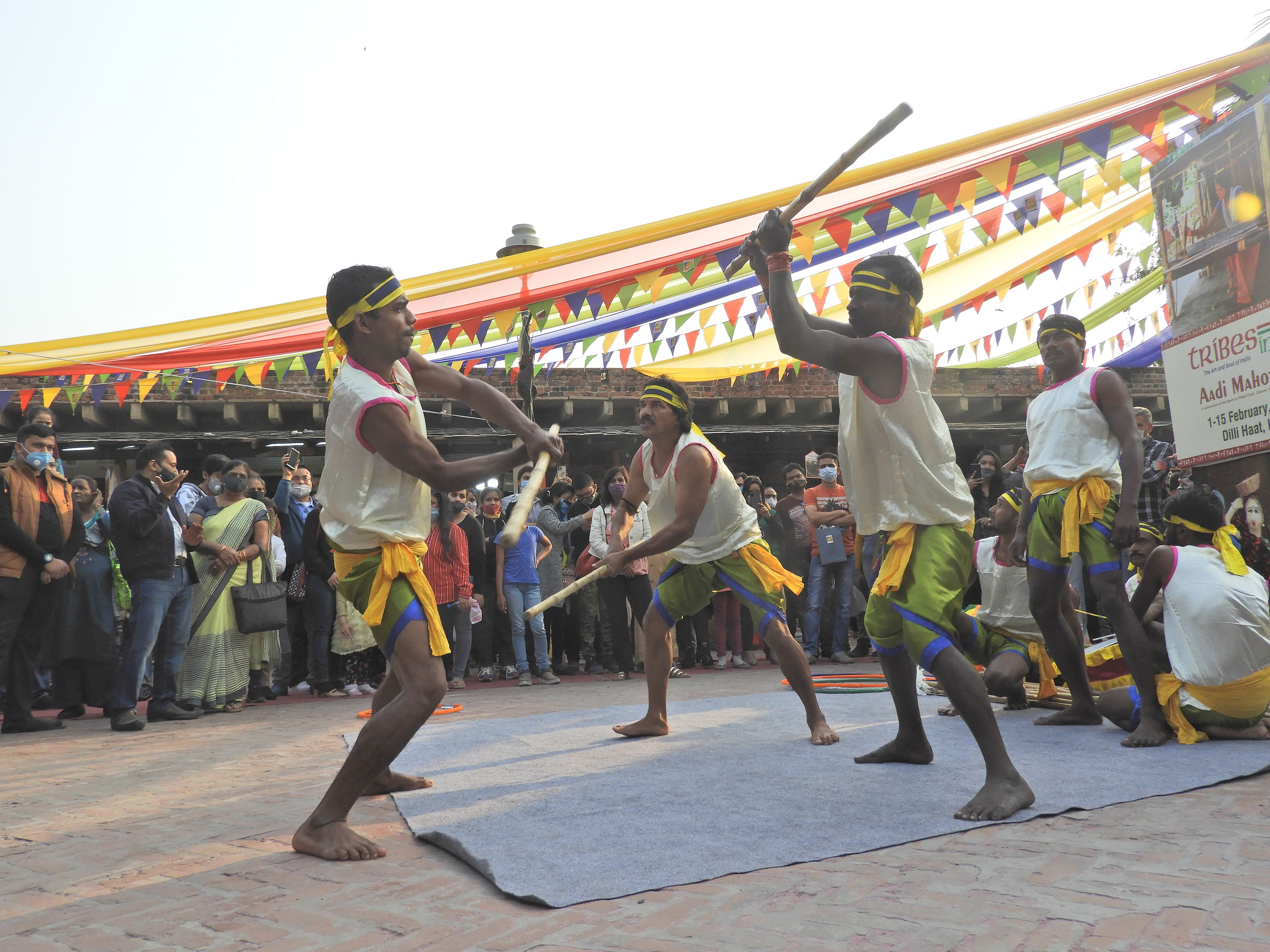
Bambo sticks were one of the swords of the self defence before the discovery of fire arms

Raibenshe (Bengali: রায়বেঁশে), alternatively, Raibeshe (Bengali: রায়বেশে), is a genre of Bengali folk martial dance performed by male only. This genre of dance was once very popular in West Bengal. Presently, it is performed mostly in Birbhum, Bardhaman and Murshidabad districts.

== Dance ==
Traditionally, this dance involves vigorous and manly movements of the body along with the acrobatics of a raibansh (a long bamboo stick), from which its name originated. During the performance, the performers enact the actions of drawing a bow, throwing a spear and waving a sword. The performers wear a brass anklet (nupur) on their right ankle. This dance is accompanied by dhols (drums) and Kanshis (cymbals). This dance was traditionally performed by Bagdi community, who worked as the bodyguards of the landlords in medieval Bengal.

== See also ==
- Gurusaday Dutt
- Bratachari Movement
