= List of museums in West Bengal =

This is a list of museums in West Bengal state in eastern India.

Museum name	City	Theme	Funding
Academy of Fine Arts, Kolkata	Kolkata	Art	
Baker Hostel	Kolkata	Historical	
KMOMA	Kolkata	Modern Art	The Museum will be developed under Government of West Bengal
The Asiatic Society	Kolkata	Social history	
Asutosh Museum of Indian Art	Kolkata	Art & Archaeology	Part of the University of Calcutta, Indian art with special emphasis on the art of Bengal
Birla Industrial & Technological Museum	Kolkata	Science	Exhibits include biotechnology, electricity, physics, life science, mathematics, industry and mining, television and transport
Buxa Fort	Buxa	Historic fort	
Gurusaday Museum	Kolkata	Folk	
Indian Museum	Kolkata	Multiple	Exhibits include antiques, armour and ornaments, fossils, skeletons, mummies, and Mughal paintings
Jorasanko Thakur Bari	Kolkata	Historic house	
Malda Museum	English Bazar	History	
Marble Palace	Kolkata	Historic house	
Nehru Museum of Science and Technology	Kharagpur	Science	
Netaji Bhawan	Kolkata	Memorial hall	
Ramakrishna Mission Institute of Culture	Kolkata	Indian Art and Culture	
Sabarna Sangrahashala	Kolkata	Biographic	
Science City Kolkata	Kolkata	Science	
State Archaeological Museum	Kolkata	Archaeology	Govt of West Bengal
Rabindra Museum	Mungpoo	History	
Victoria Memorial (India)	Kolkata	Memorial hall	
North Bengal Science Centre	Siliguri	Science	Functioning under NCSM, Ministry of Culture, Govt. of India.
South Bengal Museum	Diamond Harbour		
Bishnupur Museum	Bishnupur Bankura	Archaeology	
Acharya Satyendra Nath Bose Smriti Sangrahashala	Kolkata	Memorial / Science	This museum is funded and maintained by Bangiya Bijnan Parishad
Museum of Santal Culture	Bolpur	Culture	

== See also ==
- List of museums in India
