= Bangladeshi folk literature =

Bengali literary genre

বাংলাদেশী লোক সাহিত্য Bangladeshi folk literature
- Bengali literature (By category); Bengali language

Bengali literary history
- History of Bengali literature

Bengali language authors
- Chronological list - Alphabetic List

Major Folk Literature
- Mymensingh Gitika, Sylhet Gitika

Bangladeshi Folk Literature (Bengali: বাংলাদেশী লোক সাহিত্য) constitutes a considerable portion of Bengali literature. Though it was created by illiterate communities and passed down orally from one generation to another it tends to flourish Bengali literature. Individual folk literature became a collective product and assumes the traditions, emotions, thoughts and values of the community.

== History ==
From the third century onwards, the Mouryas, the Guptas, the Palas, the Senas and the Muslims came one after another to rule the land. As a result, they grafted their ways of life and cultural traits on the indigenous population. Subsequently, Portuguese, French and English ships anchored in the harbors of Bengal. They left not only their merchandise but also their customs. Each race left its own mark and it was not only physical but also cultural, which collectively formed the basis of the culture.

== Oral literature and its influence ==
Because folk literature is oral, it tends to rely on some mnemonic devices and patterns of language and style. Bengali Folk Literature includes different types of epic, poetry and drama, folktales, ballads, proverbs etc. and till now existing in community, whether literate or not may be in different form. The folklore of Bangladesh is heavily influenced by different races which were present years ago. The abundant folklore of the present-day Bangladesh, therefore, contains a variety of elements, which is partly to be explained by the historical forces.

== Contents of folk literature ==
Covers all branches of formalized folklore, such as tales, songs, ballads, proverbs, riddles, charms, superstitions, myths, etc.

=== Folk music and song ===
The musical tradition of Bangladesh is lyrics-based, with minimal instrumental accompaniment. We can classify folk songs in seven categories: love, ritual, philosophy and devotion, work and labour, profession and occupation, satire and fun, and mixed. On the other side there are different forms of Folk music, Baul, Gombhira, Bhatiali, Bhawaiya, kavigan, ghatu gan, jhumur, baramasi, meyeli git, jatra gan, sari gan, etc. The Baul tradition is a unique heritage of Bengali folk music, and there are numerous other musical traditions in Bangladesh, which vary from one region to the other. Gombhira, Bhatiali, Bhawaiya are a few of the better-known musical forms. Folk music of Bengal is often accompanied by the ektara, an instrument with only one string.

=== Gitika or ballads ===
Gitika means ballads though it tends to be longer than western ballads. Gitika is of two types: purbabanga-gitika & Nath Gitika.

==== Purbabanga-gitika ====
It's mainly from Mymensingh and includes 'Mahuya', 'Maluya', 'Chandravati', 'Dewana Madina', 'Kanka O Lila', 'Kamala', Dewan Bhavna' etc.

==== Maimansingha gitika ====
Maimansingha gitika or Môemonshingha gitika is a collection of folk ballads from the region of Mymensingh and around of Bangladesh. Chandra Kumar De and Dinesh Chandra Sen were the collectors and editors; the collection was published from Calcutta University, along with another similar publication named purbabanga-gitika.

==== Nath gitika ====
Its on stories of the conversion of Prince Gopi Chandra (Manik Chandra Rajar Gan, Govinda Chandrer Git, Maynamatir Gan, Gopi Chandrer Sannyas, Gopi Chander Panchali etc.) and on the miracles of the Nath guru (goraksavijay, Minchetan).

Chottogram Gitika Published(1993) By Bangla Academy Editing By Momen chowdhury and Collect By Abdus Sattar Chowdhry( 1919–1982)

=== Folk tales ===
Folk tales are stories that are handed down orally from one generation to another. They are in prose and can be simple or complex. Based on subject, meaning and form, folk tales is of fairy tales, mythical tales, religious tales, adventure stories, heroic stories, sage tales, historical tales, legends, animal stories, fables, or comic stories. The lead characters of Bengali folk tales are fate and divinity dependent and execute magical power rather than intellect, wisdom, labour, struggle or work.

=== Folk drama ===
Folk drama is combination of dance, song, music, and acting called as Bhasan, jatra, pala gan, ghatu, gambhira, alkap, kavigan, puppetry, etc. It can be for entertainment or educational purposes. Jatra is the most popular form of Folk drama. In Jatras, legendary plays of heroism, mythological stories, folktales of love and tragedy, and similar countless themes are enacted in open-air theatre. While some folk dramas emphasise songs, others stress dancing or acting. Folk drama are commonly based on stories of Rama and Sita, Arjun and Draupadi, Radha and Krishna, Nimai Sannyas, Behula and Laksindar, Isha Khan Dewan, Firoz Dewan, Zainab and Hasan, Sakhina and Kasem, Hanifa and Jaigun, Rahim Badsha, Rupban, Baidyani etc. Folk dramas usually have a mythical, historical, religious and political flavour.

=== Rhymes ===
Rhymes (Chhara) can be classified into the following groups: nursery rhymes, play rhymes, social rhymes, historical rhymes, satirical rhymes, occupational rhymes, educational rhymes, rhymes for rituals, and magical rhymes. Rhymes are recited or sung to calm and entertain children, many are for fun or to educate people on ethics, morality, mathematics, astrology etc. Some rhymes originated in historical events and preserve the memory of these events.

=== Proverbs ===
Proverbs are the shortest form of folk literature. Generally they are composed on the basis of human experience, pragmatic consideration, and wisdom. Many proverbs are found in the vedas and the upanisads as well as in the charyapada, the oldest specimen of Bengali literature.

The Folk Literature refers not to written, but to oral traditions. It may be in prose or verse, often mythological or historical, it can be narrative epic, occupational verse, ritual verse, praise poems to rulers and other prominent people. Whatever it may contain it highlights the exemplary wisdom of illiterate peoples.

== See also ==
- History of Bengali literature
- Culture of Bengal
- Culture of India
- Culture of West Bengal
- Music of Bangladesh
- Music of Bengal
- Music of India
- Music of West Bengal
- Nath Literature
