= Dey's =

Dey's may refer to:

- Dey's (company), a department store located in and around Syracuse, New York
- Dey's Arena, a series of ice rinks and arenas located in Ottawa, Ontario
- Dey's Medical, a pharmaceutical and ayurvedic medicine manufacturer in India

== See also ==
- Day (disambiguation)
- Daze (disambiguation)
- Dey (disambiguation)
