= Dey (disambiguation) =

Dey was the title given to the rulers of the Regency of Algiers from 1671. It was also used in Tunisia between 1591-1860.

Dey may also refer to:

- Dey (month), the 10th month of the Iranian calendar
- Dollar Euro Yen, a proposed world currency

== People with the given name Dey ==
- Dey Young (born 1955), American actress
- Robert Isaac Dey Gray (c. 1772-1804), British-Canadian lawyer, judge and political figure

== People with the surname Dey ==
- Anind Dey (born 1970), American computer scientist
- Bishnu Dey (1909-1982), Indian Bengali poet
- Claudia Dey (born c. 1972), Canadian dramatist
- Edgar Dey (1883-1912), Canadian ice hockey player
- Esha Dey, Indian actress
- Frederick Van Rensselaer Dey (1861-1922), American writer
- Graeme Dey (born 1962), Scottish politician
- Hussein Dey (1765-1838), Last dey of Algiers
- Joseph Dey (1907-1991), American golf administrator
- K. C. Dey (1893-1962), Indian Bengali actor, singer and music composer
- Krishanu Dey (1962-2003), Indian Bengali football player
- Lal Behari Dey (1824-1892), Indian Bengali journalist and author
- Manna Dey (1919-2013), Indian singer
- Manishi Dey (1906-1989), Indian Bengali artist
- Mukul Dey (1895-1989), Indian Bengali artist
- Peter A. Dey (1825-1911), American civil engineer
- Susan Dey (born 1952), American actress
- Tamal Dey (born 1964), Indian Bengali computer scientist and mathematician
- Ted Dey (1864-1943), Canadian ice hockey owner
- Tom Dey (born 1965), American film director, screenwriter, and producer
- Tracey Dey (born 1943), American singer
- William Dey (1870-1921), Canadian ice hockey player

== Other usages ==
- Dewoin language of Liberia, also known as Dey

== See also ==
- De (surname)
- Dey's (disambiguation)
- Dey Street
- The D.E.Y.
