= Barun De =

Indian historian (1932–2013)

- Born: 30 October 1932; Calcutta, Bengal
- Died: 16 July 2013 (aged 80); Calcutta, West Bengal
- Education: St. Xaviers Collegiate School; Presidency College, Calcutta; St Catherine's Society, Oxford; Nuffield College, Oxford
- Scientific career
- Fields: History
- Notable students: Sumit Sarkar Dipesh Chakrabarty Rudrangshu Mukherjee

Barun De (30 October 1932 – 16 July 2013) was an Indian historian. He served as the first professor of social and economic history of the Indian Institute of Management, Calcutta, founder-director of the Centre for Studies in Social Sciences, Calcutta and the Maulana Abul Kalam Azad Institute of Asian Studies, Kolkata and as the honorary state editor for the West Bengal District Gazetteers. He was chairman of the West Bengal Heritage Commission.

== Early life and education ==
De was born into an illustrious Bengali Brahmo family. His father, Major (Honorary) Basanta Kumar De, was a high-ranking officer of the BNR. His grandfather was Brajendranath De, Esq. ICS. One of his eight paternal aunts was Saroj Nalini Dutt, M.B.E. Uma Bose and Subrata Mitra, both older than him, were his niece and nephew on the paternal side of his family

He studied at European School, Adra and St. Xavier's Collegiate School, Calcutta. He completed his higher studies at Presidency College, Calcutta, where he was a student of Professor Susobhan Chandra Sarkar. He was Debate Secretary of Presidency College's Student Union.

He went to St. Catherine's Society, Oxford where he completed his 2nd B.A. (Honours School). He was awarded the Curzon Memorial Prize for his essay "Macaulay and India". He completed his D.Phil. thesis on "Henry Dundas and the Government of India, 1784–1801" under the supervision of Major (Dr.) C.C. Davies. on a Beit studentship at Nuffield College, Oxford. As the holder of this scholarship he taught students of the college. He was Secretary, Treasurer and President of the Oxford India Majlis.

He formed a lasting friendship with Professor S. Nurul Hasan, the historian and Governor of West Bengal.

== Career ==
De, who became a full professor at the age of 33, held various positions at various times, including a senior professorship of social and economic history and programme directorship of the Post-Graduate Training Programme of the Indian Institute of Management, Calcutta, the founder-directorship of the Centre for Studies in Social Sciences, Calcutta and the Maulana Abul Kalam Azad Institute of Asian Studies, a membership, held for three terms, of the Indian Council of Historical Research, New Delhi, a membership of the West Bengal Higher Education Commission and an honorary state editorship of the West Bengal District Gazetteers.

He taught and worked abroad, among other places, at Duke University as a visiting associate professor, the Indian Institute of Advanced Studies, Shimla, as a senior fellow, Fondation Maison des sciences de l'homme, Paris as a directeur, University of Sydney and University of Milan as a visiting professor, and the University of World Economy and Diplomacy, Tashkent as the India Chair (in the rank of minister-counsellor) for three years, with attachment to the Indian Embassy of Uzbekistan,. He was secretary (1974–76), sectional president (1972) and general president (1988) of the Indian History Congress.

In 2004, he was appointed to a membership of the NCERT textbook review committee. In his post-retirement years, he was chairman of the West Bengal State Archives, Calcutta, a vice president of the Asiatic Society of Bengal, a member of the Board of Trustees of the Indian Museum, Calcutta, and a member of the Heritage Conservation Committee of the Kolkata Municipal Corporation, in which capacity he was among the several people who prepared a list of heritage buildings of West Bengal. The Times of India has described him as "a pioneer of the heritage movement of West Bengal", From 2008 to 2011 he was honorary chairman (in the rank of minister-of-state) of the West Bengal Heritage Commission, of which he was a member from 2001 to 2008.

He was appointed as a Tagore National Fellow by the Government of India, which he held at the Victoria Memorial Hall, Calcutta (2011–2013).

== Research ==
De's research spanned from early- to late-modern periods of Indian history. In the earlier part of his career he wrote on Henry Dundas and the conquest of India, while later on he addressed the Marxist critique of the colonial context of the Bengal renaissance. He was also concerned with the national movement: his popular textbook book, Freedom Struggle, co-authored with Bipan Chandra and Amalesh Tripathi, was censored by the new Central government that came to power in India in 1977. It has been translated into Bengali by Brajadulal Chattopadhyaya. In 1975 he edited a thick volume in honour of Prof. Susobhan Sarkar in which he wrote the main essay on his teacher which reveals his preference for objectivity and critical analysis. He was the editor of 24 Parganas and Darjeeling District Gazetteers. He contributed to the editing of the Jalpaiguri District Gazetteers.

== Views ==
De was well known for his criticism of the emergency of 1975–77.

== Awards ==
- D.Litt. (Honouris Causa), North Bengal University, 2000.
- Banga Samman, 2008–09

== Death and legacy ==
De died due to renal failure in Kolkata on 16 July 2013 aged 80.

The Maulana Abul Kalam Azad Institute of Asian Studies, Calcutta has instituted a Barun De Memorial Lecture. Barun De Auditorium of Jadunath Bhavan Museum and Resource Centre, the museum of the Centre for Studies in Social Sciences, Calcutta, is named after him.

His son, Dr. Bikramjit Dey, is a professor of legal history at the West Bengal National University of Juridical Sciences, Kolkata.

== Publications ==
- Secularism at Bay: Uzbekistan at the Turn of the Century (New Delhi, 2006)
- (ed.) State, Development and Political Culture: Bangladesh and India, (New Delhi, 1997) (co-edited with Ranabir Samaddar)
- (ed.) Mukti Sangrame Banglar Chatra-Samaj (Students of Bengal in the Struggle of Liberation) (in Bengali), (Calcutta: Paschim Banga Itihas Samsad, 1992)
- (ed.) West Bengal District Gazetteers, 24 Parganas, (Calcutta, 1983)
- (ed.) West Bengal District Gazetteers, Jalpaiguri, (Calcutta, 1981) (co-edited with Abani Mohan Kusari).
- (ed.) West Bengal District Gazetteers, Darjeeling, (Calcutta, 1980)
- The Dialectics Between Response to Exogenous and Autochthonous Innovation in India in the Nineteenth and Twentieth Centuries, with Special Reference to Modern Bengal, (Tokyo: United Nations University, 1979)
- (ed.) Perspectives in Social Sciences, 1: Historical Dimensions (New Delhi, 1977)
- "A Biographical Perspective on the Political and Economic Ideas of Rammohun Ray", in V.C.Joshi, (ed.), Rammohun Roy and the Process of Modernisation in India, New Delhi, 1975
- (ed.) Proceedings of the Indian History Congress, (Calcutta: Jadavpur Session, 1974)
- (ed.) Proceedings of the Indian History Congress, (Aligarh: Aligarh Session, 1975)
- (et al. eds.) Essays in Honour of Professor Sushobhan Chandra Sarkar (New Delhi, 1975)
- Freedom Struggle (New Delhi, 1972), (co-authored with Bipan Chandra and Amalesh Tripathi)

== See also ==
- NCERT textbook controversies
