= Gurusaday Dutt =

Indian writer, folk literature researcher and civil servant

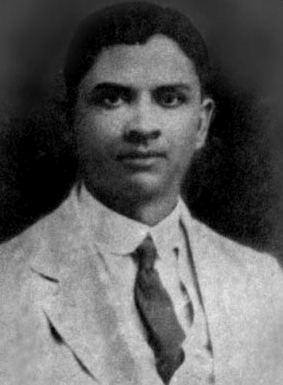
- Gurusaday Dutt
- Born: 10 May 1882; Birasri, Karimganj, Assam Province, British India
- Died: 25 June 1941 (aged 59); Calcutta, India
- Occupations: Civilian, folklorist
- Spouse: Saroj Nalini Dutt (née Dé)
- Children: 1

Gurusaday Dutt (10 May 1882 – 25 June 1941) was a civil servant, folklorist, and writer. He was the founder of the Bratachari Movement in the 1930s.

== Early life and education ==
Gurusaday was the son of the Ramkrishna Dutta Chaudhuri and Anandamayee Debi. His father was a son of the zamindar of Birasri village in Karimganj sub-division of Sylhet district, in eastern Bengal. Members of his family were followers of Vaishnavism. He lost his father at the age of 9 and his mother when he was 14. After their death, he did not get along well with his jyathamashai (father's elder brother), who was then the landlord of the village.

He completed his Entrance (School Leaving) examination at Government College, Sylhet where he stood first in 1898. He stood second in the F.A. examination (prior to Graduate studies) from Presidency College, Calcutta in 1901 and was awarded the Scindia Gold Medal. Despite objection from his jyathamashai, who refused to pay for his further education, he went on a scholarship raised by the Sylhet Union to Emmanuel College, Cambridge, in the United Kingdom. He passed the Indian Civil service (ICS) examination in 1905. In the first part of the examination he stood seventh and in the second part he stood first. Overall he stood first in the examination in that year. He was the first Indian to have stood first in the Open Competitive Service examination. He also passed the Bar examination with a First Class, and was called to the Bar by the Honourable Society of Gray's Inn.

He removed Chaudhuri from his surname while he was at Cambridge.

He repaid the scholarship money to Sylhet Union after working for a few years, so that the Union could help another student from the same district with that money. In 1905, he returned to India and started work as an ICS officer.

He was married to Saroj Nalini Dutt (née Dé), a daughter of Brajendranath Dé. His son was Birendrasaday Dutt, who was a co-founder and an original trustee of the Gurusaday Museum in Joka, Calcutta.

== Career ==
He served with distinction in the Bengal cadre, which in 1905 included the present day Bangladesh and the Indian states of West Bengal, Bihar and Orissa in India. He served in various capacities in the districts of Arrah, Hooghly, Pabna, Bogra, Jessore, Faridpur, Comilla, Dacca, Barisal, Khulna, Birbhum, Bankura, Howrah and Mymensingh, before coming to Calcutta. He was District Magistrate, Mymensingh, Director, Industries and Secretary, Local Self Government and Public Health. He was also the Government Chief Whip in the Bengal Legislative Council. From 1930 to 1933, he was a nominated Member of the Council of State and of the Central Legislative Assembly (the erstwhile Parliament of British India).

== Contributions to social work ==
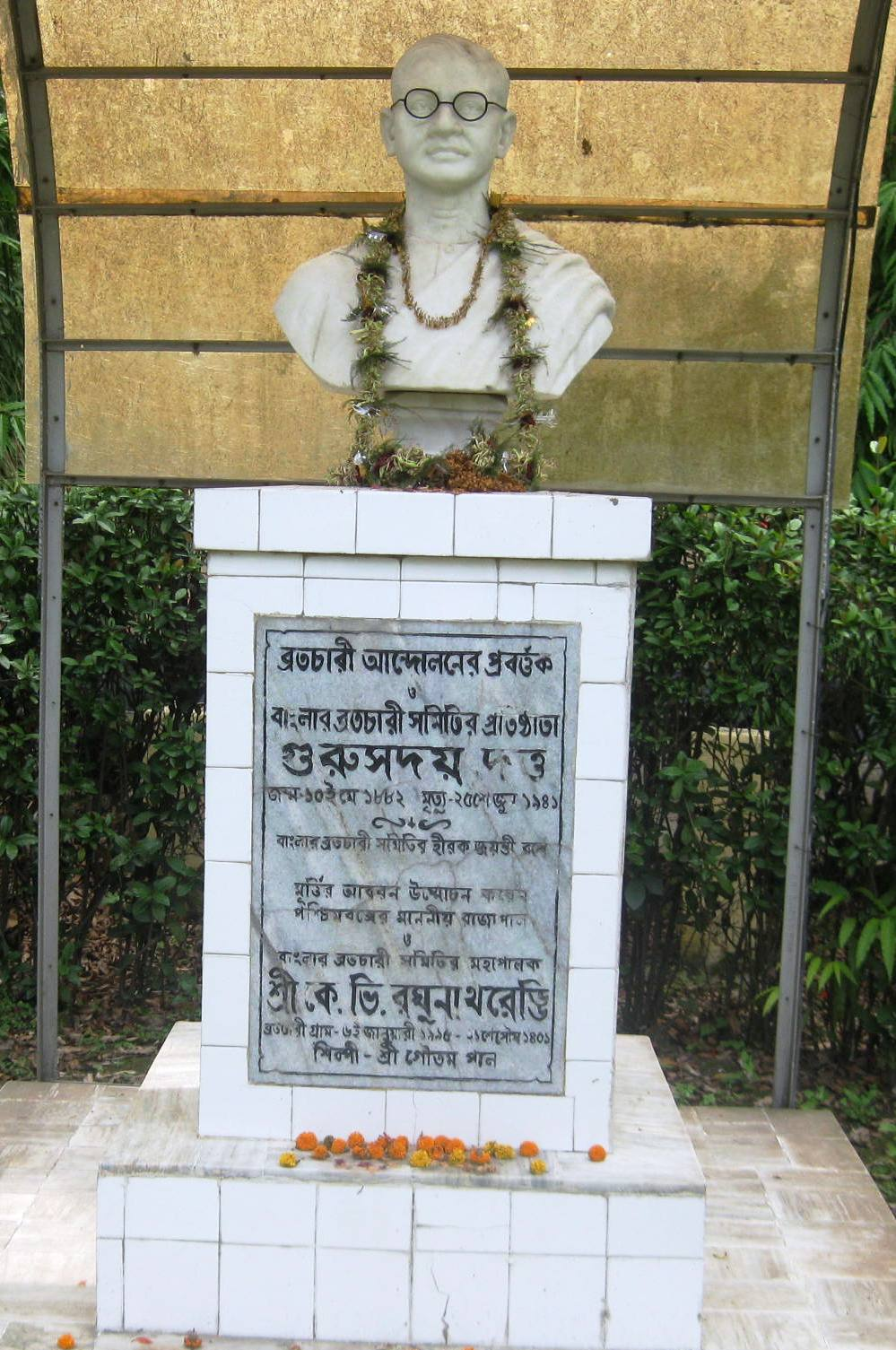
Statue of Gurusaday Dutt in front of Gurusaday Museum, Kolkata, India.

From his youth, Gurusaday started to take active interest in social service and participated in helping fire-fighters and assisting in relief work during floods and other natural disasters. He was one of the social reformers of the first half of the nineteenth century who thought independently about various avenues of service to the rural poor. He realised that in order to establish any progressive idea on firm foundation it was necessary to educate women and make them self-reliant. Saroj Nalini Dutt, who became an eminent Social Worker in her own right, was inspired by Gurusaday to start Mahila Samitis (Women's Institutes) as early as 1913, at Pabna district in British India, where he was then the District Magistrate.

In 1918, Gurusaday started the first Rural Reconstruction Movement in India in Birbhum. He then extended the movement to several districts where he was subsequently posted, like Bankura, Howrah and Mymensingh. This movement was bold and unique, as India was under British Rule at the time. In fact, he was advised by his senior officer that he should spend time in the Club socialising with other officers rather than pursuing activities to promote rural development and social welfare.

He was the first amongst civilian officers to set an example of the dignity of labour, by manually working with a group of followers to eradicate the water hyacinth, a plant that covers ponds and makes water unusable. He would also re-excavate silted irrigation canals with a band of workers. In those days, it was unthinkable for a Magistrate to work manually with common people.

In 1922, he started a Society for co-operative irrigation in Bankura, which he later extended to Mymensingh and Birbhum.

He headed the Indian delegation as a representative of the British Indian Government at a meeting of the Agricultural Institute at Rome in 1924.

In 1925, he lost his wife at a very early age. He established the Saroj Nalini Dutt Memorial Association, in February 1925, as a Central Training Institute for training crafts and basic education to provide livelihood to women who had been deprived from receiving formal education in early life and lived at the mercy of relatives. He thought of non-formal education many years before it was officially started. His pioneering work was started when most women in India were still behind the purdah (veil), and would not dare to come out in the world to create a future for themselves. This organisation became the apex organisation for Mahila Samitis (Women's Institutes) in Eastern India, and was later affiliated to the Associated Country Women of the World (ACWW) and the International Alliance of Women.

In October 1925, he started Bangalakshmi, a monthly magazine that is still published.

In 1929, he started a magazine called Gramer Daak that dealt with agrarian and rural matters of concern.

It was at Mymensingh that he started a Folk Dance Revival Society. He revived the Jaari dance, being inspired by the secular nature of the dance and its spirit of unifying both Hindus and Muslims, at a time when communal tensions were running high.

In 1929, it was during Dutt's fourth visit to England that he attended All-England Folk Dance & Folk Song Festival. This inspired him to set up the Bangiya Palli Sampad Raksha Samiti (translated as Cultural Heritage Protection Society of Bengal) on his return.

In 1930, he discovered the Raibeshe folk dance, a martial dance of un-divided Bengal, in Birbhum. He studied the origins of the dance and discovered its rich cultural past and its connection with the army of Raja Man Singh of Rajasthan. Subsequently, he also revived the Kaathi, Dhamail, Baul, Jhumur, Brata and Dhali dances from different parts of un-divided Bengal.

In 1932, he started the Bratachari movement. In his words in The Bratachari Synthesis, first published in 1937,

the Movement is to bring back to humanity, in all countries, the ideal and practice of the wholeness of life which, alike in the individual, the national and the international sphere has been so grievously shattered in the modern world in every country by the fragmentary outlook on, and treatment of, life in education, science, work, play and social functioning.

In its aim to re-establish life on its fundamental unity, while preserving the inherent values of the individual and regional diversities, the Bratachari movement relies on a system of simultaneous physical, moral and spiritual culture with the threefold objectives of i) shaping of life in accordance with a fully balanced ideal comprising the five Bratas or ultimate ideals which are of universal application, and adopting a course for their pursuit for the integration of the culture of the body and the soul, and of the thought, speech, and behaviour; ii) the pursuit of rhythmic discipline for bringing about unification, harmony and joy as well as inner transformation; and iii) bringing men and women of every country in touch with the regional culture of their own soil and with the arts and crafts, dances and songs, and customs and manners of their own region, thus providing a natural cultural medium for their healthy all-round growth. By this threefold sadhana (devotion), the Bratachari system seeks to enable men and women in each land to become, simultaneously, truly national and truly international.

In 1934, the Bangiya Palli Sampad Raksha Samiti was renamed as The Bengal Bratachari Society. In 1936, he started a magazine Banglar Shakti for The Bengal Bratachari Society.

Gurusaday Dutt did extensive research in the field of Folk art, crafts and folk dances of Bengal. He collected objects of folk art and crafts from the countryside. He had great compassion for the artists and craftsmen who created unique art objects without any training or technical knowledge. Folk art was neglected and not appreciated in those days. He wrote in different journals about the wealth and beauty of folk art and left his collection on his death to The Bengal Bratachari Society.

== Contributions to art and culture ==
Gurusaday Dutt was mostly known for his interest and contributions to Bengal's folk art, folk dance and folk music. He spent a lifetime collecting and studying art objects and handiwork from the remotest corners of undivided rural Bengal collecting items of folk art such as Kalighat paintings, patuas' scrolls, embroidered kanthas, terracotta panels, stone sculptures, wooden carvings, dolls and toys, moulds used for making patterns on sweets or mango-paste etc. Gurusaday Dutt also wrote extensively on folk culture. Rabindranath Tagore and C.F. Andrews wrote in the foreword of the biography of his wife, Saroj Nalini Dutt, which he wrote. Gurusaday Dutt also wrote a good deal about the Bratachari movement.

== Controversies ==
His fearless independence and indomitable spirit of nationalism brought him into conflict with the British Government on more than one occasion. In 1928, at Howrah, in connection with the Bamangachi Firing case, he condemned the firing on a crowd of protesters by the police led by a British officer. The matter was raised in the British House of Lords and Lord Birkenhead, then Secretary of State for India in the British Government, had to answer angry questions. British Parliamentarians wanted Dutt, referred to as this Indian officer, punished for having the audacity to question a British officer’s action. As a punitive measure he was transferred out of Howrah to Mymensingh.

His stay in Mymensingh was also cut short when he failed to give orders as required by him by the British Indian Government to deal with protesters against The Salt Act imposed by the Government. M.K.Gandhi had called for a satyagraha against this Act. He was transferred to Birbhum by telegram (then the fastest means of communication), which was an unprecedented way of dealing with an ICS officer in those days.

== Organisations founded ==
- Mymensingh Folk Dance and Folk Music Society (1929)
- Pallisampad Raksha Samiti (1931)
- Bratachari Lokanritya Samiti (1932)
- South India Bratachari Society (1932)
- Sarbabharatiya Bratachari Society etc.
- In 1941 he also set up the Bratachari village(Bratacharigram) near Calcutta, and the Bratachari Janashiksha Pratishthan. The Bratachari movement founded by Gurusaday Dutt (from vrata, vow) was a movement for spiritual and social improvement. The movement aimed at creating a sense of world citizenship as well as national awareness among people, irrespective of caste, religion, sex and age. The movement aimed to nurture the mind and the body and to encourage people to work for national and individual improvement through encouraging traditional and folk culture, especially folk dance and folk song. The bratacharis, or followers of the movement, pledged themselves to build their moral fibre and serve the country on the five principles of knowledge, labour, truth, unity and joy. They aimed at developing the mind and body through dance as well as by undertaking to perform good deeds. The Bratachari movement did not catch on all over India and slowly died away after the death of its founder. In 2011, the Mamata Banerjee Government again made Bratachari education compulsory in Primary schools in West Bengal, after the Marxist Communist Government withdrew it from the School curriculum in 1984.
- Gurusaday Museum (1961).

== Publications ==
Gurusaday Dutt wrote many books and articles, which are listed below. The latest book to be published is "Banglar Lokashilpa o Lokanritya" (in Bengali), which is a collection of his essays and articles on Folk Art and Folk Dances of Bengal in various magazines between 1928 and 1941(his death), that were painstakingly obtained from the old magazines at Bangiya Sahitya Parishad's library by his grandson Devsaday Dutt and granddaughter-in-law Priyadarshini Dutt. The book has been published by Subhromani De and Subhadra De of Chhatim Books in 2008.

- Bhajar Banshi (1922) (in Bengali) (A book of rhymes for children)
- Palli Sangskar (in Bengali) (1925)
- Village Reconstruction (1925)
- Agricultural Organisation and Rural Reconstruction in Bengal (1919)
- Ganer Saji (in Bengali) (1932)
- Indian Folk Dance and Folklore Movement (in Bengali) (1933)
- Bratachari Synthesis (in Bengali) (1937)
- Patuya Sangit (in Bengali) (1939)
- Bratacharir Marmakatha (in Bengali) (1940)
- A Woman of India] (1941)
- Bratachari: Its Aim and Meaning (1942)
- The Folk Dances of Bengal (1954)
- Shrihatter Lokasangit (in Bengali) (1966)
- Folk Arts and Crafts of Bengal (1990)
- Art of Kantha (1995)
- Banglar Lokashilpa o Lokanritya (in Bengali) (Calcutta: Chatim Books, 2008)
- Goraey Golod (in Bengali)
- Gramer Kaajer ka kha Ga (in Bengali)
- Saroj Nalini
- Palli Sanskar O Sangathan (in Bengali)
- Paaglamir Puthi (in Bengali)
- Purir Mahathwa (in Bengali)
- Gaaner Saaji (in Bengali)
- Banglar Samrik Krira (in Bengali)
- Chaander Buri(in Bengali)
- Bratachari Shakhaa (in Bengali)
- Bratachari Marmakatha (in Bengali)
- Patua Sangeet (in Bengali)
- Bratachari Parichoy (in Bengali)
- Srihotter Lokageeti (in Bengali)
- Banglar Bir Jodha Raebeshe (in Bengali)

== Death and commemoration ==
He died at the age of 59 of cancer. After he died, his son, Birendrasaday Dutt, took the initiative in renaming Ballygunge Store Road, where he had built himself a house, after him.

His portrait adorns the walls of Mahajati Sadan in Calcutta.

Biographies have been written on his life and works in Bangladesh by Shankar Prasad De, Amitabha Chowdhury, Shaikat Azgar and Naresh Banerjee.

A Medal in his honour, known as "The Gurusaday Dutt Medal" along with a Cash prize, was endowed by his grandson, Devsaday Dutt, at the University of Calcutta, which is given to the student who stands First in the Post-Graduate Examination in Geography, from 2008 onwards.

Gurusaday Dutt Scholarships are also being awarded by the Sylhet Union (Srihatta Sammilani), Kolkata for brilliant students pursuing post-graduate studies.

His articles initially published in the 1930s in journals such as Prabashi, Banglar Shakti, Bangalakshmi and Aloka (in Bengali), have been republished in a book entitled Banglar Lokashipla o Lokanritya in August 2008.

== Family ==
His daughter-in-law, Aroti Dutt, was an eminent social worker, and was the World President of the Associated Countrywomen of the World for two terms and President of the Saroj Nalini Dutt Memorial Association, Calcutta. His grandson is Devsaday Dutt, FCA (England & Wales) and his great-grandsons are Rajsaday Dutt FCA, MBA (Darden School) and Shivsaday Dutt MBA (Kelley School).

== See also ==
- Bratachari movement
- Saroj Nalini Dutt
- Gurusaday Museum
