= Satyendra Chandra Mitra =

Indian politician

Satyendra Chandra Mitra সত্যেন্দ্রচন্দ্র মিত্র
- Born: 23 December 1888; Noakhali, Bengal, British India
- Died: 27 October 1942 (aged 53); Calcutta, Bengal, British India
- Occupations: Revolutionary, Statesman
- Spouse: Uma Mitra
- Children: Aroti Dutt
- Parent(s): Uday Chandra Mitra; Udaytara Mitra

Satyendra Chandra Mitra (23 December 1888 – 27 October 1942) was an Indian freedom fighter, who started his political career as a revolutionary aligning himself with the Jugantar Party. In 1916 he was arrested and interned at Janjira Char, located in the midst of the Padma River (present-day Bangladesh) and was subsequently released after the Great War. Continuing his studies he qualified as an Advocate in the High Court of Calcutta and joined the Swaraj Party, founded by Deshabandhu Chittaranjan Das.

The British Administration at the time, disturbed by the success of the Swaraj Party, feared a revolution. Consequently, Mitra was imprisoned in Mandalay Jail in Burma from 1924 to 1927 along with fellow leaders of the Swaraj Party, Netaji Subhas Chandra Bose and Anil Baran Roy.

Upon his release, he was elected unopposed to the Central Legislative Assembly, the forerunner to the Indian Parliament, in 1927. He was a member of The Age of Consent Committee in 1927-28 that was composed of parliamentarians tasked with determining the legal age for girls and boys to marry. This resulted in The Child Marriage Restraint Act in 1929, commonly known as the Sarda Act.

Mitra fought tirelessly for the welfare and release of political prisoners in the Central Assembly. When Pandit Motilal Nehru led the Sawaraj Party, Mitra was elected as the Chief Whip. Subsequently, the Swaraj Party merged with the Congress Party.

In 1934, following defeat in the general election, Mitra returned to Calcutta. Later he became the President of the Bengal Legislative Council (of undivided Bengal) in 1937, holding this position till his death on 27 October 1942. He was survived by his wife Uma Mitra and only child, Aroti Dutt.
