= Dazed and Confused =

Dazed and Confused may refer to:

== Music ==
- "Dazed and Confused" (Jake Holmes song), a 1967 song by Jake Holmes, popularized by Led Zeppelin
- "Dazed & Confused" (Ruel song), 2018
- Dazed and Confused, a 2014 EP by Jake Miller, and its title song

== Other media ==
- Dazed and Confused (film), a 1993 film by Richard Linklater
- Dazed, a British style magazine formerly called Dazed & Confused

== See also ==
- Daze (disambiguation)
