= Chowdhury Gulam Akbar =

Bangladeshi writer

- Born: 16 September 1921; Dargapur village, Maulvi Bazar District, British India (now Bangladesh)
- Died: 29 December 1988 (aged 67); Maulvi Bazar
- Citizenship: Bangladeshi
- Education: Matriculation
- Occupations: Writer, poet, collector of folk literature
- Spouse: Fatema Begum Chowdhury
- Writing career
- Language: Bengali
- Genre: Bengali folk literature
- Subject: Bengali literature
- Notable awards: Muktabuddi Shahitya Shibir Padak (1977), Public Library Padak (1981), Syed Sultan purushkar (1982), Naityalook sylhet padak (1985)

Chowdhury Gulam Akbar (Bengali: চৌধুরী গোলাম আকবর; 16 September 1921 – 29 December 1988) was a Bangladeshi writer. He served in the Bangla Academy of Bangladesh as the collector of Bengali folk literature.

== Early life ==
Gulam Akbar was born on 16 September 1921 in Dargahpur village of Maulvi Bazar District (now Kamalganj Upazila, Moulvibazar District, Bangladesh). He passed the Middle English Examination in 1936. After passing the M.E Examination, he sat for a competitive examination and became a primary school teacher in 1942. Became a teacher he passed Guru training examination in 1952. As a private candidate he passed the Matriculation examination in 1954. After built the teaching career of 25 years, he resigned in 1967. He died in Maulvi Bazar on 29 December 1988.

== Writing career ==
Gulam Akbar had a special fascination for folk literature. After retirement, he was appointed as collector of folk literature by Bangla Academy. He toured the Sylhet region and collected a large number of ballads and songs. He wrote several books on folk literature and also edited many lyrics and folk songs. He wrote many prose on Bengali literature. In his early life he wrote poems and songs. A compiled book collection of his written poems named Amar Kabita was published after his death.

== Notable work ==
- Sylhet Gitika (1968)
- Kholafae Rasheda ba Char Khalifar Punthi (1969)
- Sadhak Kavi Bhavananda (1978)
- Sylhet Nagari Parikrama (1978)
- Radharaman Sangit (1981)
- Lokasahitye Islam (1987)
- Lokasahityer Katha (1988)
- Rastrovasha Ekushya Proshongo (1997)
- Jalalabader Sanskritik Oitihya (1998)
- Rachana o sangraha Sambhar Vol-1 (2007)
