= Maimansingha Gitika =

Collection of Bengali folk tales

Maimansingha Gitika (Bengali: মৈমনসিংহ গীতিকা, lit. 'Mymensingh Ballads') is a collection of Bengali folk ballads originating from the eastern part of Mymensingh (present-day Netrokona), Bangladesh. The ballads were later published in English under the title Eastern Bengal Ballads. The songs were collected and edited by Dinesh Chandra Sen, and the collection was published by the University of Calcutta, together with another similar compilation, Purbabanga-gitika.

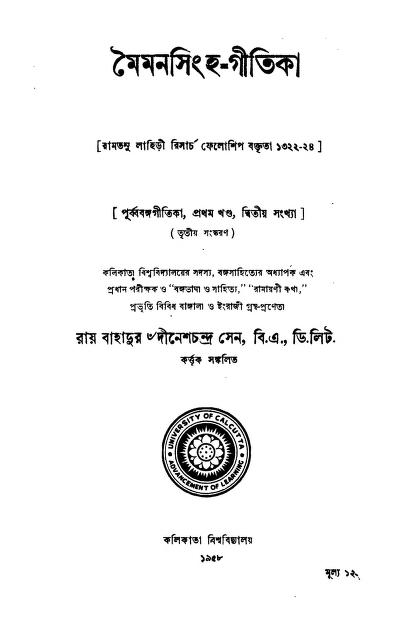
Cover of Maimansingha Gitika

== Historical and geographical context ==
=== Geographic ===
Maimansingha Gitika was first introduced internationally by Dineshchandra Sen, a professor at the University of Calcutta, in 1923. The songs in this collection mostly draw from stories of the Mymensingh District and its adjoining areas, which are regarded as among the richest regions in Bengali folk culture.

This cultural richness was shaped by favourable geography—the triangular zone formed by mountains and rivers, fertile soil, and accessible transport routes. These conditions contributed to both agricultural prosperity and cultural development. Even during periods when folk traditions weakened elsewhere, Mymensingh retained its reputation for music and oral storytelling. Researcher Asaddor Ali from Sylhet argued that some well-known ballads of Maimansingha Gitika were originally connected to the regional culture of Sylhet.

=== Historical ===
The ballads are primarily set in the 18th century, a period often described as part of "premodern Indian literature," when spiritual and religious themes dominated literary expression. Gitikas, being a popular form in Bengali literature, embodied these cultural elements. As such, Maimansingha Gitika not only reflects the literary conventions of its time but also functions as an important historical source, offering insight into the lives, values, and beliefs of people in premodern Bengal.

== Structure and thematic elements ==
According to Zbavitel (1963), the collection contains 55 ballads with over 21,000 lines. Among the most well-known ballads are Malua, Mahua,Chandravati, Kamala, Dewan Bhabna, Dosyu Kenaramer Pala, Rupabati, Kobko O Leela, Kajolrekha, and Dewan Madina. Except for Dosyu Kenaramer Pala, most of these centre on romantic relationships between men and women, ending either happily or tragically. Notably, many of the ballads are named after female protagonists. These heroines are described in vivid and emotional detail. According to Sen, the folk ballads provided women with greater scope for representation compared to elite classical literature, which often limited female expression. A famous song from Mahua pala of Maimansingha Geetika, demonstrating the poetic style is given below:

A song of Mahua pala (in Bengali script)

লজ্জা নাইরে নির্লজ্জ ঠাকুর লজ্জা নাইরে তর
গলায় কলসী বাইন্ধা জলে ডুব্যা মর।
কোথায় পাব কলসী কন্যা কোথায় পাব দড়ি
তুমি হও গহীন গাঙ আমি ডুব্যা মরি।

— Dwija Kanai

=== Collection of heroine-centred ballads ===
One of the most significant ballads in the collection is the story of Chandravati. Zbavitel provides a detailed summary. Chandravati met Jayananda when he came to help her gather flowers. They fell in love and were married through a matchmaker. However, the heroine was devastated when her husband betrayed her and married another Muslim woman. Traumatised, Chandravati turned to the god Shiva. When Jayananda later sought forgiveness, she was deep in meditation and refused to see him. After her meditation ended, only a farewell letter and Jayananda's drowned body remained. Her father then encouraged her to channel her grief into writing, leading her to compose her version of the Ramayan, part of which was later published by D. C. Sen.

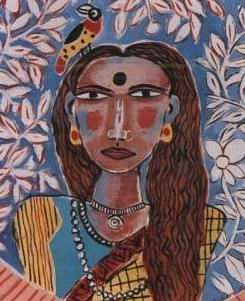
Chandravati

Chandravati's Ramayan "is now considered the first feminist text in its retelling of the Rama narrative from Sita's perspective and its rejection of Rama's normative masculinity."

Sen notes that Chandravati deliberately shifts the focus away from Rama, instead highlighting Sita's suffering. She openly criticises Rama's actions and includes personal reflections as narrator. Rather than glorifying divine figures, she presents a grounded human story. Written not for royal patrons but for ordinary village women, her text directly addresses them, reflecting its oral and communal roots.

Chandravati's conclusion does not offer a happy reunion or spiritual closure. Instead, the heroine finds strength in storytelling itself. The narrative becomes a space where grief and injustice are voiced rather than erased. As a result, the ballad stands as both a story of love and loss, and an act of protest.

Other ballads in the collection follow a similar pattern, often focusing on female characters who endure emotional struggles and display resilience. Ahmed and Chakraborty observe that women in these stories are usually more expressive, courageous, and self-sacrificing than men. Their experiences form the emotional core of the narratives, allowing these oral texts to foreground female voices and perspectives.

=== Hindu–Muslim mixture ===
Another distinctive feature of Maimansingha Gitika is its portrayal of religious harmony. The stories depict characters from both Hindu and Muslim communities, generally showing peaceful coexistence. In the few cases where religion plays a more prominent role, Zbavitel notes that such elements do not dominate the overall tone. Instead, the gitikas reflect a cultural environment where traditions cross religious boundaries. According to Ali, these ballads teach moral lessons that transcend religion, caste, and ethnicity.

This influence goes beyond literature, contributing to awareness of gender identity among rural Bangladeshi women. The accessible language and sympathetic heroines allow women listeners to connect the narratives with their own lives and struggles. The gitikas thus serve as an important example of female voice. Characters like Chandravati are more than literary figures; they are cultural icons challenging expectations of female conformity. In this way, Maimansingha Gitika functions both as a body of storytelling and as a subtle form of social commentary that encouraged early gender consciousness in everyday life.

== Cultural influence and political significance ==
Ahmed and Chakraborty describe Maimansingha Gitika as "one of the most celebrated and affluent treasures of Bengal."

Widely regarded as a cultural treasure, Maimansingha Gitika reflects the values, traditions, and everyday life of rural communities. Ali considers it a key archive of Bengali oral culture. The collection also acquired political significance during the Swadeshi movement following the 1905 partition of Bengal. As Castaing notes, the ballads were presented as examples of indigenous creativity and cultural pride.

Sarkar explains that this period saw a revival of interest in folk traditions as tools for asserting national identity. In Mymensingh and surrounding regions, organisations such as the Suhrid Samiti arranged public performances of the ballads to connect with ordinary people. These events often proved more effective than political speeches in spreading anti-colonial sentiment. Figures such as Dineshchandra Sen treated the ballads not only as literary works but also as instruments for fostering national pride.

Sarkar further observes that certain patriotic songs of the era appealed to both Hindu and Muslim audiences. These examples demonstrate how folk culture could help bridge religious divisions. Placing Maimansingha Gitika in this context shows how oral traditions became part of wider cultural and political mobilisation.

The lasting influence of the collection also lies in its intergenerational role, transmitting folklore, cultural memory, and ethical frameworks. In rural society, the ballads were often performed at family gatherings, weddings, and festivals, reinforcing communal ties and providing oral education. Through rhythm and repetition, values such as loyalty, sacrifice, love, betrayal, and justice were impressed upon listeners of all ages. Over time, characters and narratives from the ballads became shared cultural references that shaped village discussions on morality and social roles.

For women, these performances provided a culturally accepted means of expressing emotion and grievance in the absence of formal platforms. The lyrical and dialogic form of the gitika encouraged emotional engagement. Heroines such as Malua and Chandravati were portrayed not as passive figures but as active agents whose choices carried narrative weight. Their stories offered imaginative alternatives to restrictive social realities, fostering empathy, solidarity, and critique.

In a broader perspective, the gitikas helped cultivate regional identity during a time of colonial disruption and nationalist revival. By focusing on local landscapes, dialects, customs, and relationships, they reinforced a sense of rootedness in eastern Bengal. Their popularity during the Swadeshi movement was no accident: the ballads' rural origins, oral authenticity, and accessibility made them effective for mass mobilisation. Cultural leaders and reformers used them to claim a living heritage distinct from colonial or metropolitan traditions.

Moreover, as Sarkar notes, the integration of inclusive religious imagery in the gitikas represented a deliberate cultural strategy. By emphasising shared values, they offered a counter-narrative to communal tensions. Their depictions of Hindu–Muslim coexistence—though sometimes idealised—served as symbolic resources for imagining pluralism. In this way, Maimansingha Gitika functioned both as a cultural artefact and as an aspirational model.

Today, the collection is studied not only as literature but also as a historical source. Scholars analyse how its narratives reflect everyday life, gender relations, local belief systems, and changing norms. Folklorists, literary historians, and gender theorists use it to explore how oral traditions shape social consciousness. While the performance culture that nurtured the gitikas has diminished, their printed form continues to testify to the voices of ordinary people—especially women—long excluded from the literary canon.

Globally, the collection highlights the richness of Bengali literature. Ali argues that it contributes to world literature by showing how rural oral traditions shape collective memory. The publication of the collection also helped preserve the Bengali language, which risked marginalisation under colonial structures. The success of Maimansingha Gitika encouraged further compilations: three additional volumes were later published, covering more districts. A total of 55 songs were made available to the public after the release of the fourth volume.

== Debates on authenticity ==
Zbavitel raises concerns regarding whether the ballads are genuinely traditional. Some scholars, including poet Jasimuddin, questioned their authenticity as he could not trace similar ballads during fieldwork. Nandagopal Sengupta doubted their antiquity, while Sukumar Sen argued that the texts had been extensively edited.

Zbavitel categorises the criticisms into three types: (1) the absence of such ballads in contemporary Mymensingh villages; (2) the difference between the ballads’ language and the local dialect; and (3) the content—particularly the secular tone and romantic themes, which appeared modern.

In response, Zbavitel suggests that the disappearance of oral traditions over time is not unusual, especially with the passing of older performers. Moreover, these ballads required skilled reciters and were not part of everyday village songs. Eyewitnesses such as Azhual Islam and Krishna Goswami attested to the existence of the ballads from personal memory.

Although the published versions appear in a somewhat different dialect, this was likely due to editorial intervention and limited familiarity with local orthography. The collector, Chandrakumar De, and his team worked with constraints but sought to preserve as much of the oral tradition as possible.

Another factor complicating the debate is the nature of oral transmission itself. Folk ballads are dynamic traditions, changing with each performance to suit the storyteller's memory, the audience's expectations, and the broader social context. Critics who expect fixed textual consistency may be applying standards of written literature that do not align with oral genres. Zbavitel further notes that stylistic features such as repetitive phrasing and thematic structures are consistent with other recognised folk traditions, strengthening the case for the Gitika's authenticity.

Additionally, the processes of collecting, editing, and publishing oral material inevitably involve interpretation. Collectors such as Chandrakumar De functioned not only as archivists but also as mediators who shaped the material in line with early 20th-century cultural narratives. While some alterations are likely, this does not negate the folk origins of the ballads. Instead, it highlights the ways oral literature adapts and survives within changing cultural contexts.

Overall, Maimansingha Gitika may be appreciated both for its literary value and as a record of oral storytelling practices, even if the published texts bear signs of adaptation.

== See also ==
- Sylhet Gitika
- Bangladeshi folk literature
- Bengali literature
- Kajalrekha (Bengali folk ballad)
