= Daze =

Daze may refer to:

- Stunning
- Daze (band), a Eurodance band
- Daze, Burkina Faso, a village in Tenkodogo Department, Boulgou, Burkina Faso
- Dazexiang (lit. Great Swamp Village), a village in Anhui, China, the place of the Dazexiang Uprising in 209 BCE
- Éric Dazé (born 1975), Canadian ice hockey winger
- "Daze", a song by Doug Wimbish from the album Trippy Notes for Bass

== See also ==
- Dazed, a British style magazine
- Dazed and Confused (disambiguation)
