= Uma Bose =

Indian musician

Uma Bose (Hashi)
- Born: 22 January 1921; Calcutta
- Died: 22 January 1942 (aged 21); Calcutta
- Occupation: Singer

Uma Bose (Hashi) (22 January 1921 – 22 January 1942) was a musician.

== Early life ==
Bose was born in Calcutta to Prabha Bose (née Mitra) and Dharani Bose. Her father, who built the Mackinnon Mackenzie building in Calcutta and was a councillor of the Calcutta Municipal Corporation, belonged to an eminent family of builders. On the maternal side of her family, she was a great-granddaughter of Brajendranath De.

== Career ==
Bose was a student of Dilipkumar Roy, with whom she composed several songs.

Mahatma Gandhi once described her as 'The Nightingale of Bengal' in 1937.

== Death ==
Bose died of tuberculosis on 22 January 1942, on her 21st birthday.

== Songs ==
- "Aaj Faguner Protham Diney" (1938)
- "Aakasher Chand Matir Phuletey" (1943)
- "Rupey Barney Gandhey" (1940)
- "Key Tomarey Janatey Parey" (1943)
- "Jibaney Maroney Esho" (1940)
- "Chand Kahey Chameli Go Hey Nirupama" (1938)
- "Jharano Patar Pathey" (1938)
- "Neel Pori" (1940)
- "Andharer Dorey Gatha" (1941)
- "Prokitir Ghomtakhani Khol" (1937)
- "Tomaye Guni Jeno Shuni" (1937)
- "Rangajabaye Kaajki Ma Tore" (1943)
- "Mon Tumi Krishi Kaaj Jano Na" (1937)
- "Nirjharini" (1940)
- "Aji Tomar Kachey Bhashiya Jayee" (1937)
- "O Amar Mon Bholano" (1939)
- "Modhu Murali Baajey" (1940)
