= Bratachari movement =

The Bratachari movement (from vrata in Bengali meaning vow Bengali: ব্রতচারী আন্দোলন) was a movement for spiritual and social improvement in bengal initiated by Gurusaday Dutt in 1932. The movement aimed to raise the self-esteem and national awareness of people of undivided bengal regardless of their religion, caste, sex or age. It was a comprehensive programme of physical, mental, and intellectual culture, based on folk traditions of physical exercise, art, dance, drama, music, singing and social service. The Bratacharis undertake to perform good deeds, strengthen fellowship and develop the mind and body through dance.

== In the words of the Founder ==
Gurusaday Dutt, the founder of the movement, in his book "The Bratachari Synthesis"(first published in 1937) wrote:

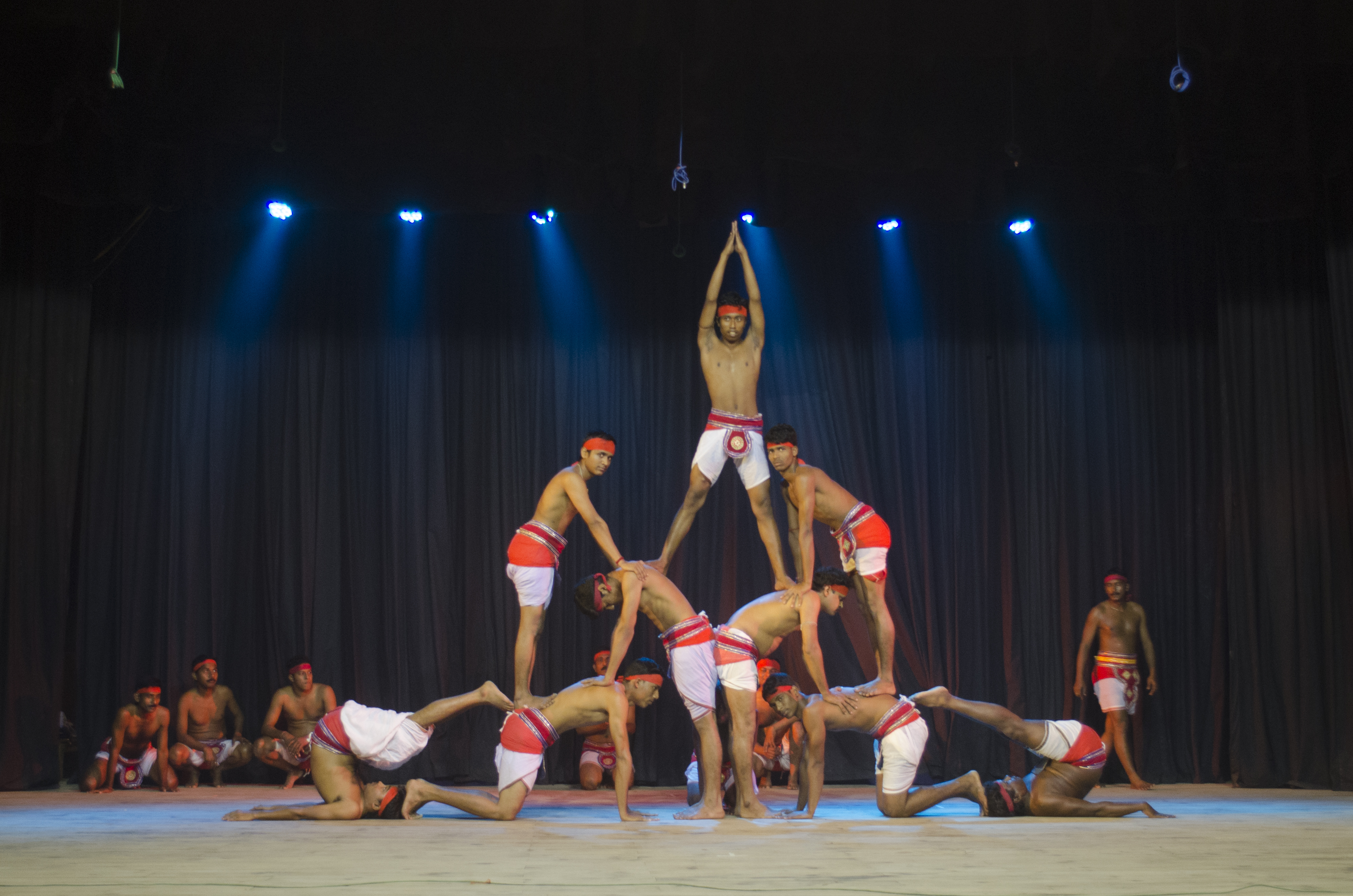
Bratachari Dance

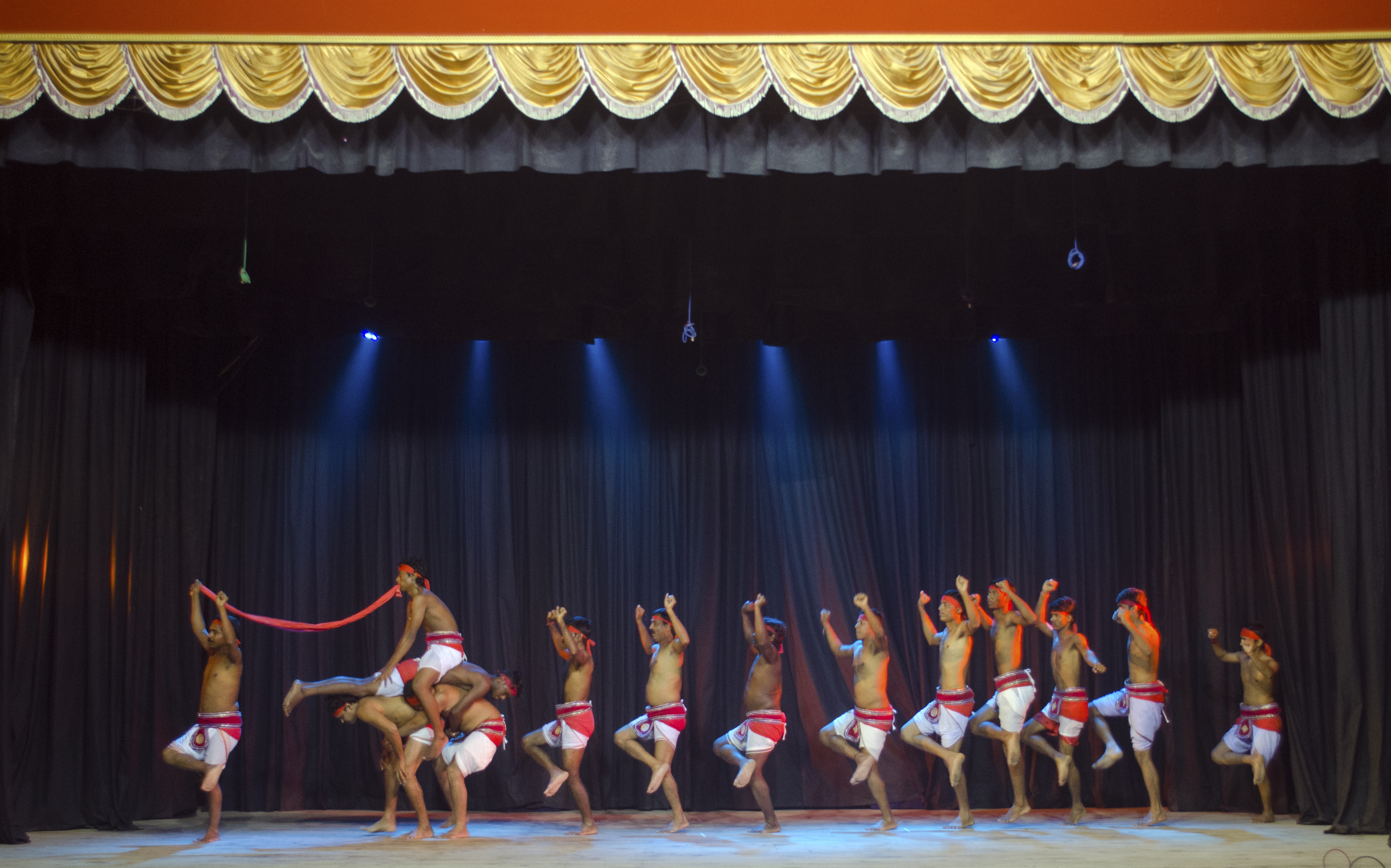
Bratachari Dance

Bratachari purports to present a complete synthesis of life, an integrated system of culture consisting of a complete philosophy of life, coupled with and expressed through a simple scheme of practical training and discipline for the building up of the inner life and character as well as the body, or in other words, for the simultaneous and harmonious cultivation of the body and soul of man.

"Brata" signifies a solemn or sacred purpose, ideal or objective which is pursued as a joyous rhythmic ritual simultaneously through an integrated use of thought, word, and physical movement, and is also used to signify the combined joyous integrated ritual itself. "Chari" denotes one who pursues a purpose, ideal or objective. According to the Bratachari, the whole of life should be regarded as a Brata and should be pursued as a complete whole and as an integrated ritual, inspired by a noble purpose which is at once spiritual and practical. The single Brata or solemn purpose and ritual of life is divided into five bratas representing a five-fold path in the complete realisation of life which, however, must be pursued simultaneously and not in separate compartments. The five bratas are: Knowledge, Labour, Truth, Unity and Joy. The name Bratachari thus denotes one who has solemnly undertaken the duty of building up his or her life through the systematic and integrated pursuit to the five bratas.

Therefore, the ultimate goal of a Bratachari is the attainment of the ideal of the complete man by attaining perfection in self-development in all spheres of life– physical, mental, moral and social; or in other words, the attainment of the ideal of a perfect citizen of the world. At the same time, it is an essential principle of the Bratachari teaching that before one can be a complete citizen of the world, one must, be a complete citizen of a particular regional unit.

The movement seeks to create in each country a nationwide discipline of common citizenship among persons of both sexes, of all castes and creeds and of all ages, by developing a high character, physical fitness in ideal and practice, the pursuit of constructive work, an observance of the dignity of labour and a joyous community spirit through common participation in national dances and songs as well as community dances and community songs.

== The Movement ==
The movement was propagated by the Bengal Bratachari Society which was started by Gurusaday Dutt. It has its office at 191/1, Bepin Behari Ganguly Street, Kolkata 700 012, India. Bratachari societies were established in many places of undivided Bengal. The monthly magazine Bratachari Barta of the Bratachari movement, was published by the Faridpur Bratachari Samiti from November 1934 onwards. Subsequently, in 1936, the monthly "Banglar Shakti" started being published by The Bengal Bratachari Society. It was revived in 2003 and the present Editor is Naresh Banerjee, one of the biographers of Gurusaday Dutt.

The headquarters of the movement is in Kolkata. But it is now independently growing in Bangladesh, particularly in Sylhet and Dhaka, where Bratachari training has been incorporated into the Bangladesh Education system.

The All Bengal Bratachari Training camp is held annually at Bratacharigram in Joka, Kolkata, India. Teachers and youths from all over undergo training in the Bratachari system of education.

On the 125th birth anniversary of Gurusaday Dutt in 2006, the Bengal Bratachari Society organised a torch rally from his birthplace in Bangladesh to his workplace in West Bengal. 19 Bangladeshi Bratacharis participated in the rally. The Bangladeshi group started their rally on 19/12/2006 from Birasri in Sylhet, the birthplace of Gurusaday Dutt, and ran for the next 3 days until they reached Banapol port on the border of India. On the Indian side, 5000 Bratacharis were waiting to receive the Bangladeshi Bratacharis. Two leaders from the two Banglas, exchanged their greetings by exchanging two flamed torches. 'Md.Fahad Bin Aziz Chowdhury', a relative of Gurusaday Dutt, was the team leader in the "International Torch Rally" from Bangladesh.
