= Chandra Kumar De =

- চন্দ্রকুমার দে
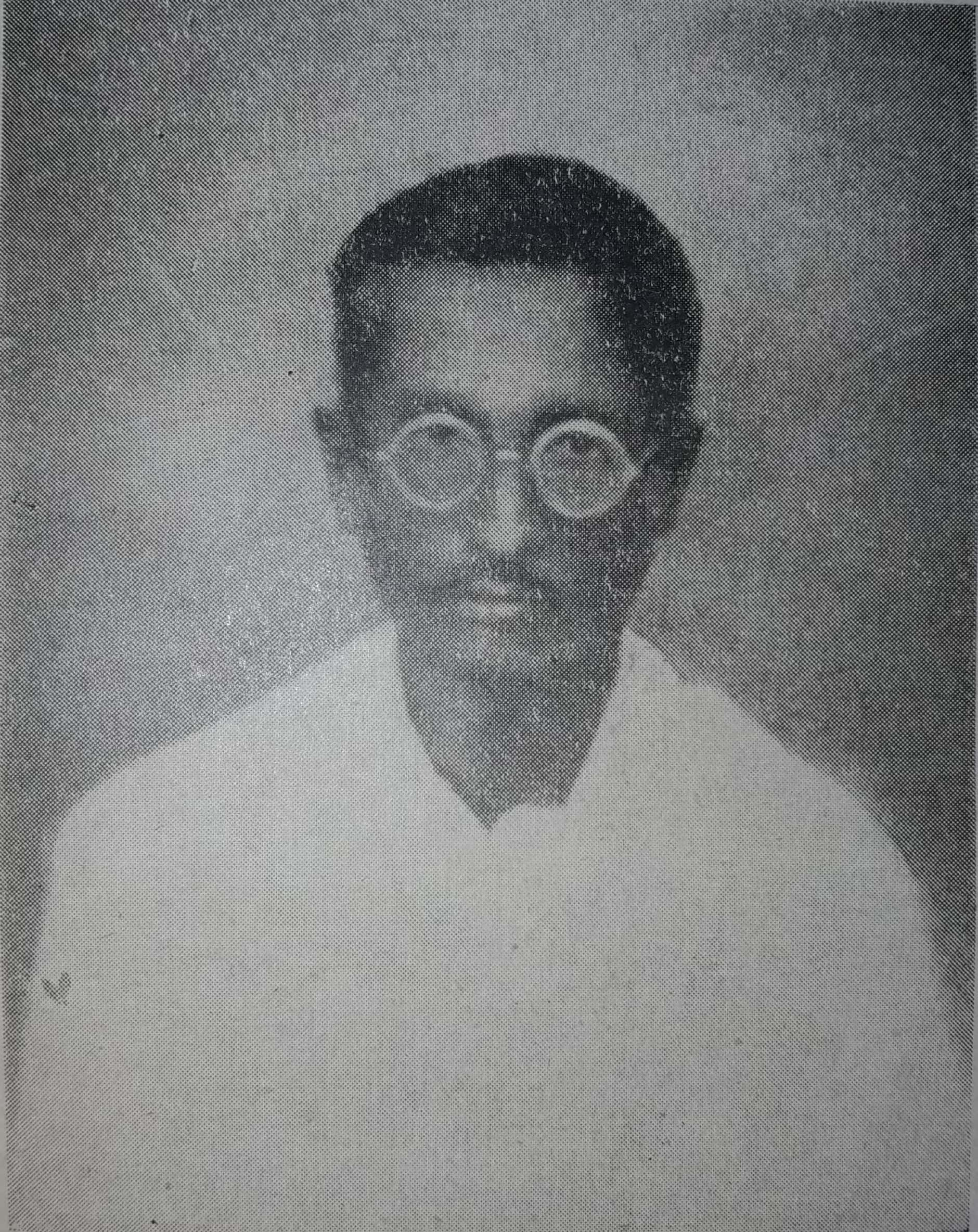
- Born: 1889; Aithar, Netrokona, Mymensingh District, Bengal Presidency
- Died: 1946 (aged 56–57); SK Hospital, Mymensingh, Bengal Province, British Raj
- Occupation: Folklorist

Chandra Kumar De (Bengali: চন্দ্রকুমার দে, romanized: Chôndrôkumar De; 1889–1946) was a writer and collector of medieval folklore and folk ballads of East Bengal villages, mostly in the Greater Mymensingh region which is now in Bangladesh. Today, he is an important folklore collector of Bengal, and his collected ballads are an important part of Bengali folk literature, they were published by University of Calcutta as Moimonshingho Gitika (1923) and Purbabanga Gitika (1923–1932), later published in English as Eastern Bengal Ballads.

== Early life ==
De was born in village Aithor in Netrokona district, his father was Ram Kumar De whose ancestral village was Raghabpur in Netrokona District. He lost both his parents early and had to start working young. Apart from a brief stint at a Sanskrit tol, Chandra Kumar had no formal schooling.

== Career ==
Chandra Kumar initially started working at a grocery shop, at a monthly salary of one rupee. But he was an indifferent worker and soon lost his job. He was later appointed tahsildar by Taranath Talukder on a monthly salary of two rupees. In 1912, Chandra Kumar published some essays on folklore in the Saurabh, a Bengali-magazine published from Mymensingh and edited by Kedarnath Majumder, who had discovered De, and also helped Chandra Kumar get a job at the zamindari of Gouripur. Chandra Kumar's work as gomastha, on a monthly salary of eight rupees, included visits to different villages to collect taxes. It was on these visits that he had occasion to hear kavigan and pala gan, which he started writing down.

Meanwhile, Dinesh Chandra Sen came across Chandra Kumar's essay, 'Mahila Kavi Chandravati' ('Chandravati, the Poetess') in the Falgun 1320 BS (1913 AD) issue of the Saurabh. Dinesh Chandra was impressed by the essay and appointed Chandra Kumar, who was again out of a job, as a folklore collector of Calcutta University at a monthly salary of 70 rupees, along with three other folklore collectors. This appointment freed Chandra Kumar to travel throughout Bengal collecting folklore and folk songs.

Chandra Kumar collected several ballads, many of which were subsequently edited by Dinesh Chandra Sen and included in Maimansingha Gitika (1923) and Purbabanga Gitika (1926). The ballads collected by Chandra Kumar in Maimansingha-Gitika are 'Mahuya', 'Maluya', 'Chandravati', 'Dasyu Kenaram', 'Kamala', 'Rupavati', 'Kanka O Lila', 'Dewana Madina', and 'Dhopar Pat'. The ballads collected by him in Purbabanga-Gitika are 'Bheluya Sundari', 'Maisal Bandhu', 'Kamalarani', 'Dewan Isha Khan', 'Firoze Khan Dewan', 'Ayna Bibi', 'Shyamaray', 'Shiladevi', 'Andha Bandhu', 'Bandular Baramasi', 'Ratan Thakur', 'Pir Batasi', 'Jibalani', 'Sonaramer Janma', and 'Bharaiya Raja'. Besides these, Chandra Kumar also collected some other ballads: 'Adhuya Sundari', 'Suratjamal', 'Kajalrekha', 'Asma', 'Satyapirer Panchali', 'Chandravatir Ramayana', 'Lilar Baramasi', and 'Gopini Kirtan'. Most of these ballads were collected from Mymensingh and Sylhet. Though Dinesh Chandra Sen became famous for publishing these poems, the original credit for collecting these songs and transcribing them must go to Chandra Kumar.

Chandra Kumar died at S.K. Hospital in Mymensingh in 1946.

== Works ==
- Eastern Bengal Ballads, Mymensing, Volume 2, Part 1, by Chandra Kumar De. ed. Dinesh Chandra Sen. University of Calcutta, 1926.
- Eastern Bengal Ballads, Mymensing, Volume 3, Part 1, by Chandra Kumar De. ed. Dinesh Chandra Sen. University of Calcutta, 1932.

== See also ==
- Bengali folk literature
