= Alkap =

Bengali folk performance

Alkap (Bengali: আলকাপ) is a Bengali folk dance popular in the districts of Murshidabad, Malda and Birbhum in West Bengal and Chapai Nawabganj, Rajshahi in Bangladesh. It has also spread to the adjoining areas of Jharkhand and Bihar such as Dumka and Purnia.

== Etymology ==
Kaap means 'kavya' (verse) and Aal means 'part of the verse'. Another meaning of the word Aal is 'sharp'. The word Kaap is also one of the many meanings of 'sam' (সং) - a distorted form of gesture in the arena, or an image of a humorous comedian or social ugly subject.

== Form ==
Alkap is an amalgamation of music, dance and theatrical presentation. An alkap group of ten to twelve performers is led by a sarkar (master) or guru (leader) and includes two or three young men called chhokras, one or two gayens or singers, dohar, choristers, and musicians. Alkap is presented in five parts: Asar Vandana, Chhora, Kaap, Baithaki Gaan and Khemta Pala. The programme is a reflection of rural society and puts the focus on the prevailing socio-economic condition of the rural masses.

== In popular culture ==
Syed Mustafa Siraj's novel Mayamrdanga is about an Alkap team.

Narayan Gangopadhyay's novel Baitalik features Alkap too, as Siraj mentions in the introduction to his first edition of Mayamridanga.
