= Brajendranath De =

Indian member of the Indian Civil Service (1852-1932)

Brajendranath Dey
- Born: 23 December 1852; Calcutta (now Kolkata), West Bengal, India
- Died: 20 September 1932 (aged 79); Calcutta (now Kolkata), West Bengal, India
- Education: Hare School, Canning Collegiate School, Canning College, Lucknow, Calcutta University
- Occupation: Orientalist
- Spouse: Nagendranandini De (nee Bose)
- Children: 5, including Saroj Nalini Dutta, MBE
- Relatives: Barun De (Grandson) Uma Bose(Great Granddaughter) Subrata Mitra (Great-Grandson) Peary Charan Sarkar (Great-Granduncle)

Brajendranath De (23 December 1852 – 20 September 1932) was an early Indian member of the Indian Civil Service.

== Early life and education ==
De studied at Hare School, Calcutta, and then Canning Collegiate School and Canning College, Lucknow. After consistently ranking at the top of his class, he was placed in the first division in all his final examinations. He came first in his school during the entrance examination of Calcutta University and fourth in the first division in the First Arts examination of Calcutta University. A student of English (Honours), he ranked sixth in the first division in his Bachelor of Arts examination. Since he was a first divisioner, he was allowed to take the Master of Arts examination of the Calcutta University soon after the completion of his Bachelors (Honours) examination. He was ranked second in the Master of Arts examination and was awarded the silver medal of Calcutta University.

Later, he travelled to England for his higher studies, on the advice of his grand-uncle, Peary Charan Sarkar and his father's mentor, Raja Dakshinaranjan Mukherjee, the taluqdar of Shankarpore, United Provinces and for some time assistant commissioner of Lucknow. In England, he joined University College, London to appear in the Open Competitive Services examination. Having taken the examination successfully, he joined the Indian Civil Service in 1873, emerging 17th in a batch of 35 successful probationers selected from a total of 360 candidates. He was the 8th Indian member of the ICS. Subsequently, he was called to the Bar by the Honourable Society of the Middle Temple on 7 June 1875. He was admitted to St. Mary Hall, Oxford, where he spent one year, from 1874 to 1875, on a Boden Sanskrit Scholarship, having attended the lectures of Professor Max Mueller and Ruslan. He was the first Indian ICS officer to have studied in a college in Oxford.

His second son-in-law was Sir Sarat Kumar Ghosh, ICS, Chief Justice of Jaipur and Kashmir and the only interim Chief Justice of the High Court of Rajasthan, his fifth daughter and son-in-law were the social reformer Saroj Nalini Dutt, MBE, and Gurusaday Dutt, ICS, Secretary, Local Self Government and Public Health, Government of Bengal, his sixth son-in-law was Lieutenant Colonel Jyotish Chandra De, IMS, 2nd Indian Principal of the Calcutta Medical College, his seventh son-in-law was Captain (Hon.) Dr. Paresh Chandra Datta, first Chief Medical Officer of the B.R. Singh Memorial Hospital, Calcutta then of the East Bengal Railway and Director of Public Health, Government of West Bengal and his third son was Major (Hon.) Basanta Kumar De, Traffic Superintendent General and later Commercial Traffic Manager of the BNR.

Two of his grandsons were Ranajit Datta, chairman and managing director of Braithwaite, Burn and Jessop Limited and the historian Barun De, chairman, West Bengal Heritage Commission. Two of his great-grandchildren were the singer Uma Bose and the cameraman Subrata Mitra.

== Career ==
=== Administrative ===
He took up his first posting in the civil service as assistant magistrate and collector of Arrah, Behar in 1875. He served in districts where the rulers of erstwhile zamindari estates, such as Darbhanga and Dumrao, had a strong presence. After serving in a number of districts in Behar, he was posted in Raniganj, Bengal in 1881. He officiated as the district magistrate and collector of Bankura, Burdwan and Faridpore. He served as the full district magistrate and collector of Khulna, where he was befriended by Dr. Krishnadhan Ghosh, the civil surgeon of the district, and the father of Aurobindo Ghosh. He became the magistrate and collector of Balasore in Orissa and then of Malda and Hooghly. He was the first Indian to be elected as chairman of the Hooghly Municipal Corporation. He was an acting commissioner of the Burdwan Division.

As the district officer of Hooghly, he started the Duke Club, which was meant to be exclusively for Indians. One of his commissioners once told him to not entertain the thought of joining a British club in the district.

After retirement, he remained actively involved in the Calcutta Improvement Trust.

=== Academic ===
While still in service, De translated Kalidas's 'Vikramarvasi' and 'Manichudabadana' from Sanskrit to English. He edited an English-Bengali dictionary and published an article on inter dining in the Madras Social Reformer (1910).

In his post-retirement years, he served as a vice-president of the council of the Asiatic Society, Calcutta.

He was the translator and editor of two volumes in Nizamuddin Ahmad's Tabaqat-i-Akbari. The third volume, which he had left fully prepared, was published posthumously by Baini Prasad and M. Hidayat Hosain.

== Legacy ==
A road in Chinsura, Hooghly is named after him.

At the time of his centenary celebration in 1952, his second son, Basanta Kumar De, Esq., a senior officer of the Bengal Nagpur Railway, published three articles of his reminiscences in the Calcutta Review. This work was entrusted to Tapan Raychaudhuri, then of the Department of Islamic History and Culture of the University of Calcutta.

In 2001, approximately 2,000 photographs of himself and his family members were given in loan by one of his grandsons, Barun De, to the photographic archives of the Centre for Studies in Social Sciences, Calcutta. Later, when the archive was shifted to the newly established Jadunath Bhavan Museum and Resource Centre, CSSSC, Calcutta, the photographs too were deposited there.

== Publications ==
A member of a Kayastha family of Bengal, he was a scholar of Persian and Sanskrit. He edited and translated a few works from those languages into English. They were as follows:

- (ed. & tran.), Kālidāsa's play Vikramorvasi, 'Vikramorvaçi', Canto I., in Calcutta Review, Oct. 1884, pp. 440–2.
- (ed. & tran.), The Tabaqat-i-Akbari of Khwaja Nizamuddin Ahmad: A History of India from the Early Musalman Invasions to the Thirty-eighth year of the Reign of Akbar (in 3 Vols.), (Calcutta, reprint, 1973)
- "Reminiscences of an Indian Member of the Indian Civil Service", in Calcutta Review, (1953–5).
