= Asaddor Ali =

Bangladeshi writer and researcher

Mohammad Asaddor Ali
- মুহম্মদ আসাদ্দর আলী
- Born: Mohammad Asaddor Ali; 1929; Ludorpur, Jagannathpur, Assam Province, British India
- Died: 12 April 2005 (aged 75–76)
- Burial place: Dargah of Shah Jalal
- Occupations: Writer, researcher
- Spouse: Nurunnisa Chowdhury

Mohammad Asaddor Ali (Bengali: মুহম্মদ আসাদ্দর আলী) was a Bangladeshi writer, researcher and historian. His research primarily focused on the history of Sylhet. Due to his achievements, he was awarded the Bangla Academy Literary Award in 2004. His research discovered unknown information about Sylheti folk literature, and he wrote 19 books relating to it.

== Early life ==
Ali was born into a Bengali Muslim family in the village of Ludorpur in Jagannathpur, Sunamganj Subdivision in 1929. He was the third child of a family of five sons and one daughter. His mother, Mastura Khatun, was a teacher at the Ludorpur Ayaan Munshi Primary School. His father's name was Moulvi Muhammad Uthman Ullah.

He studied in a pathshala in the nearby village of Syedpur where he passed second place in the primary exam. He then studied in Government Jubilee High School where he completed his matriculation exams, before completing his I.A. and I.B. in Murari Chand College. Following this, he went to Dhaka University where he did a Master of Arts in Bengali language and Bengali literature. In the Govt. Teachers' Training College, he completed a Bachelor of Education degree from a talent scholarship. He was the first person in his village to graduate from a university.

== Career ==
After graduating, Ali became a teacher at the Madan Mohan College. He left teaching later on to dedicate his life towards research. He started travelling, in search of old manuscripts and books and conversed with thousands of people. He was the founding chairman of the Oitijjo Srishtikari Shahitya Shongothon Shonglap Shahitya Shanskriti Front, and held this role for a number of years. He was a member of the Bangla Academy. He was also vice-chairman and patron for the Kendriya Muslim Sahitya Sangsad for quite a long time. Studying the Mymensingh Gitika, he was able to find evidence that nine of them were actually of Sylheti origin. Ali corrected Ahmed Sharif, who wrote in his PhD thesis that medieval writer Shaykh Chand was from Chittagong, that the latter was actually from the Sylhet region. Ali was also of the opinion that Syed Sultan was a Sylheti. He established a large personal library, which has benefited many future researchers. Ali was the president of the Jalalabad Lekhok Sahitya Sangsad as well as the founding chairman of the Sunamganj Samiti Sylhet. In addition to these, he was a founding member of the Muinuddin Model Woman's College and Sylhet College. He was awarded the Ragib-Rabeya Literary Award in 2001. On 20 December 2004, he was awarded the KEMUSAS Literary Award.

== Research and publications ==
He wrote a total of 19 books. Some of these include:

- Mymensingh Gitika Bonam Sylhet Gitika (Mymensingh Gitika vs. Sylhet Gitika)
- Mohakobi Syed Sultan (The great poet Syed Sultan)
- Charyapade Sylheti Bhasha (The Sylheti language in the Charyapada)
- Lokshahitye Jalalabad (Jalalabad in folk literature)
- Sylheti Nagri Horofe Sylhet Bibhager Musolmander Shahitya Shongskriti Chorcha
- Sylheter Mohakobi Shaykh Chand (Sylhet's great poet Shaykh Chand)
- Sylhet Bibhag Shomporke Kichhu Kotha (Some words relating to the Sylhet Division)
- Sylheti Bhasha (Sylheti language)
- Sylheti Probad Probochon (Sylheti proverbs and adages)
