= Saroj Nalini Dutt =

Indian feminist

Saroj Nalini Dutt MBE
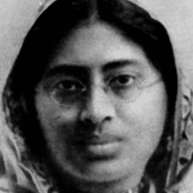
- Saroj Nalini Dutt
- Born: 9 October 1887; Bandel, Hooghly, Bengal Presidency, British India
- Died: 19 January 1925 (aged 37); Calcutta, Bengal Presidency, British India
- Occupations: Social Worker, Feminist
- Spouse: Gurusaday Dutt
- Children: Captain Birendrasaday Dutt
- Parent(s): Brajendranath De; Nagendranandini De (née Bose)

Saroj Nalini Dutt (née De) MBE (9 October 1887 – 19 January 1925) was an Indian feminist and social reformer.

== Background ==
She was born in her father, Brajendranath De's, country house in Bandel, near Hooghly, in Bengal Province. She was brought up with her brothers and sisters and shared with them an education under a tutor and a governess. Members of her paternal family frequently visited the Brahmo Sammilan Samaj in Bhowanipore, Calcutta.

In 1905, she married Gurusaday Dutt. Her only child, Birendrasaday Dutt, was born in 1909.

== Work ==
She was a reformer and a pioneer of the movement for the uplifting of women in Bengal. She pioneered the formation of Mahila Samitis (women's institutes) in Bengal. She started her first Mahila Samiti in 1913 in Pabna district with the object of developing friendly cooperation among the purdahnashin ladies. Subsequently, she started the Mahila Samitis of Birbhum (1916), Sultanpur (1917), and Rampurhat (1918) districts respectively.

She was the secretary of the Indian Section of the Calcutta League of Women's Workers (later Bengal Presidency Council of Women), member of the Council of the Nari Siksha Samiti (Women's Educational League), and Member of the Calcutta Municipal Corporation's committee which was to make suitable arrangements for allowing women to elect councillors. She was also the vice president of the Sylhet Union, an association set up for the promotion of female education in Sylhet district.

== Death ==
She died suddenly of jaundice on 19 January 1925.

== Awards ==
- Member of the Most Excellent Order of the British Empire, 1918.

== Legacy ==
Institutions named after her:

- The Saroj Nalini Dutt Memorial Association (1925).
- A girls high school in Suri, earlier named after its founder, Sir Rivers Thompson, which she helped to reorganise, is now named after her.
