= Dinesh Chandra Sen =

Indian folklorist (1866–1939)

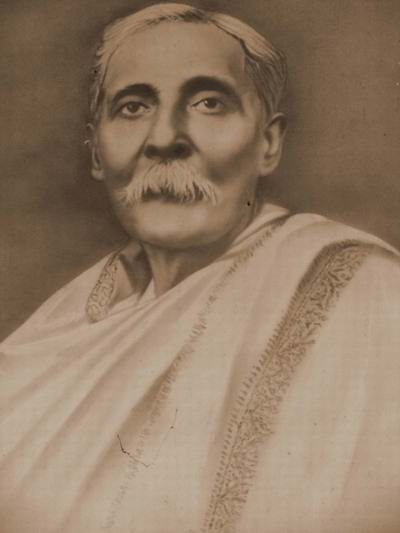
- Born: 3 November 1866; Bagjuri village, Manikganj, Bengal Presidency, British India
- Died: 20 November 1939 (aged 73); Calcutta, Bengal Presidency, British India
- Education: Jagannath University; Dhaka College
- Awards: Jagattarini gold medal

Rai Bahadur Dinesh Chandra Sen (Bengali: দীনেশ চন্দ্র সেন) (3 November 1866 – 20 November 1939) was a Bengali writer, educationist, and researcher of Bengali folklore from the Indian subcontinent. He was the founding faculty member and the Ramtanu Lahiri Research Fellow of the Department of Bengali Language and Literature of the University of Calcutta. He died in Calcutta in 1939.

== Early life and family ==
Sen was born to Ishwar Chandra Sen and Rupalata Devi in the village of Suapur (in present-day Dhaka District, Bangladesh). His mother's family was from Bogjuri in Manikganj District. Hiralal Sen was a cousin on that side. His grandson Samar Sen was a noted Bengali poet.

== Education and career ==
In 1882, he passed his university entrance examination from Jagannath College in Dhaka. In 1885, he passed his F.A. examination from Dhaka College. He passed his B.A. examination with honours in English literature in 1889. In 1891, he became the headmaster of the Victoria School (which was later uplifted to Victoria College) in Comilla. During 1909–13, he was a reader in the newly founded Department of Bengali Language and Literature of the University of Calcutta. In 1913, he became the Ramtanu Lahiri Research Fellow in the same department. He worked on the collection and compilation of Bengal folklore. Along with Chandra Kumar De, he published Mymensingh Gitika (Ballads of Mymensingh), a collection of 21 ballads. In 1921, the University of Calcutta conferred on him the Doctorate of Literature in recognition of his work. In 1931, he received the Jagattarini gold medal for his contribution to Bengali literature. He retired from service in 1932.

== Awards and honours ==
- Jagattarini gold medal, 1932

== Selected works ==
=== In Bengali ===
- Bangla Bhasa O Sahitya (1896)
- Tin Bandhu (Three Friends) (1904)
- Ramayani Katha (Tales of Ramayana) (1904)
- Behula (a folk tale) (1907)
- Sati (1907)
- Phullara (1907)
- Jada Bharat (1908)
- Sukatha (a collection of essays) (1912)
- Grihashri (1916)
- Nilmanik (1918)
- Mukta Churi (1920)
- Saral Bangla Sahitya (1922)
- Vaidik Bharat (Vedic India: based on stories from the Vedas) (1922)
- Gharer Katha O Yugasahitya (autobiographical work) (1922)
- Aloke Andhare (1925)
- Chaukir Vidambana (1926)
- Oparer Alo (1927)
- Pauraniki (Tales from the Puranas) (1934)
- Brihat Banga (Greater Bengal: a social history) in two volumes (1935)
- Ashutosh Smriti Katha (1936)
- Shyamal O Kajjal (1936)
- Padavali Madhurya (1937)
- Puratani (1939)
- Banglar Puranari (1939)
- Prachin Bangla Sahitye Musalmaner Avadan (1940)
- Rakhaler Rajgi

=== In English ===
- History of Bengali Language and Literature (1911)
- Sati (1916)
- The Vaishnava Literature of Medieval Bengal (1917)
- Chaitanya and His Companions (1917)
- The Folk Literature of Bengal (1920)
- The Bengali Ramayana (1920)
- Bengali Prose Style, 1800-1857 (1921)
- Chaitanya and His Age (1922)
- Eastern Bengal Ballads in four volumes (1923–1932)
- Glimpses of Bengal Life (1925)
