= Dutt =

Dutt (/dʌt/) is an Indian family name. Its variation is Dutta.

Notable people with the name include:

== Surname ==
- Amit Dutt, Indian scientist
- Anil Dutt, Indian cricketer
- Anjan Dutt, Indian film personality
- Aroti Dutt, Indian social worker
- Ashok Krishna Dutt, Indian politician
- Ashwini Dutt, Indian film producer
- Avijit Dutt, is an Indian film and theatre personality
- Ayesha Dutt, Indian film producer, model and actress
- Bahar Dutt, Indian television journalist
- Barkha Dutt, Indian television journalist
- Batukeshwar Dutt, Indian independence activist and revolutionary
- Brahm Dutt, Indian politician
- Chi. Guru Dutt, Indian actor
- Ganesh Dutt, Indian lawyer and administrator
- Geeta Dutt, Indian singer
- Gopal Datt, Indian actor and writer
- Guru Dutt Sondhi, Indian sports administrator
- Guru Dutt, Indian film director, producer and actor
- Gurusaday Dutt, Indian civil servant folklorist, and writer
- Gurusai Dutt, Indian badminton player
- Gyan Dutt, Indian music director
- Keshav Dutt, Indian field hockey player
- Krishan Dutt Sultanpuri, Indian politician
- Kyra Dutt, Indian actress
- Maanayata Dutt, Indian entrepreneur
- Mallika Dutt, Indian-American human rights activist
- Michael Madhusudan Dutt, Indian Bengali-language dramatist and poet
- Nalinaksha Dutt, Indian politician
- Narayan Dutt Sharma, Indian politician
- Nargis Dutt, Indian film actress
- Neel Dutt, Indian music composer and singer
- Nikil Dutt, American professor of computer science
- Nirupama Dutt, Indian poet, journalist and translator
- Parvez Dewan, (Dewan Parvez Dutt), Indian author and administrator
- Prabhabati Bose (Dutt), mother of Indian leader Subhas Chandra Bose
- Priya Dutt, Indian politician
- Priyanka Dutt, Indian film producer
- Probodh Dutt, Indian cricketer
- Rajani Palme Dutt, British politician
- Rasamay Dutt, Bengali educationist
- Ritika Dutt, Canadian entrepreneur
- Robin Dutt, German football player
- Romesh Chunder Dutt, Indian civil servant and writer
- Sadhan Dutt, Indian scientist and entrepreneur
- Salme Pekkala-Dutt, Estonian-British communist politician, wife of Rajani Palme Dutt
- Sanjay Balraj Dutt, Indian actor and film producer
- Sanjay Dutt, Indian actor
- Sarah Dutt, New Zealand artist
- Saroj Nalini Dutt, Indian feminist and social reformer
- Shekhar Dutt, Indian bureaucrat
- Subimal Dutt, Indian diplomat3
- Sunil Dutt, Indian wrestler
- Sunil Dutt, Indian movie actor and politician
- Sunil K. Dutt, Indian photographer
- Swapna Dutt, Indian film producer
- Toru Dutt, Indian Bengali-language poet
- Tribhuvan Dutt, Indian politician
- Uday Chand Dutt, Indian physician
- Utpal Dutt, Indian actor, director, and writer-playwright
- Vidya Prakash Dutt, Indian educationist and parliamentarian
- Yashica Dutt, Indian writer and journalist
- Yogendra Dutt, Fijian professional football manager
- Yogeshwar Dutt, Indian wrestler

== Middle name ==
- Anvita Dutt Guptan, Indian film writer
- Brahm Dutt Dwivedi, Indian cabinet minister
- Chandra Dutt Pande, Indian politician
- Kamlesh Dutt Tripathi, Indian theatre personality and professor
- Munishwar Dutt Upadhyay, Indian politician
- Shambhu Dutt Sharma, Indian independence and anti-corruption activist
- Shri Dutt Sharma, Indian politician
- Som Dutt Battu, Indian vocalist
- Sunil Dutt Dwivedi, Indian politician
- Vijay Dutt Shridhar, Indian journalist and writer

== See also ==
- B.C. Dutt-class tugboat, a series of service watercraft
