= Dutta =

Indian surname

Origin
- Origin: Bengali Hindu
- Region of origin: Bengal

Dutta, also spelled Datta (/ˈdʌtə/), is an Indian surname. Its variation is Dutt.

The surname is commonly found among Bengali Kayasthas, Suvarna Baniks, Gandhabaniks and some other castes in Bengal. The surname is also used by the Mohyal Brahmins of Punjab.

Datta means "given" or "granted" in Sanskrit and is also an alternative name for the Hindu deity Dattatreya.

== Surname ==
Notable people with the surname, who may or may not be affiliated with these clans/castes, include:

- Aishwarya Dutta (born 1995), Tamil actress
- Akshay Kumar Datta (1820–1886), writer
- Anandita Dutta Tamuly, record holder in Limca Book of Records
- Aloke Dutta, musician
- Amal Dutta, footballer and coach.
- Anik Dutta, Bengali film director
- Arpita Singh, born Arpita Dutta, painter
- Aswini Kumar Dutta (1856–1923), nationalist leader and philanthropist
- Bhabatosh Datta (1911–1997), economist and academic
- Bhaktivinoda Thakur (1838–1914), born Kedarnath Datta, Hindu religious leader
- Birendra Nath Datta, writer
- Bhupendranath Datta, revolutionary and sociologist.
- Chitra Singh, born Chitra Shome, singer.
- Chitta Ranjan Dutta, retired Major General of Bangladesh Army and Pakistan Army
- Debasish Dutta, Indian origin mechanical engineer and higher education administrator
- Dhirendranath Datta (1886–1971), Bengali lawyer and politician
- Divya Dutta (born 1977), film actress.
- Durjoy Datta, writer
- Guru Dutt, actor
- Himangshu Dutta (1908–1944), composer
- Indrani Dutta, Bengali television actress
- Jyotirmoy Datta, writer, journalist, poet and essayist
- J. P. Dutta (born 1949), film producer, writer and director
- Jyoti Prakash Dutta, Bangladeshi short-story writer
- Kalpana Datta, Indian independence activist
- Kamini Kumar Dutta, Pakistani politician
- Kanailal Dutta, Indian independence activist
- Lara Dutta, actress
- Mitra Dutta, Indian-American physicist
- Mohan Dutta, Indian-American media academic and activist
- Monikangana Dutta, model and actress from Assam
- Moumita Dutta, Indian physicist working at ISRO
- Munmun Dutta, actress
- Narendra Nath Dutta, Indian physician
- Nikita Dutta, actress
- Premananda Dutta, Bengali revolutionary attached with Chittagong Rebellion
- Phulrenu Guha, born Phulrenu Dutta, politician and social activist.
- Radha Raman Dutta, music composer
- Rabindranath Datta, poet and educator
- Rono Dutta, CEO of Interglobe Aviation Limited
- Samadarshi Dutta, Bengali film actor
- Sunjay Dutt, actor
- Satyendranath Dutta (1882–1922), Bengali poet.
- Shanta Dutta, microbiologist
- Sudhindranath Dutta, Bengali poet and essayist
- Supriyo Datta, nanotechnology researcher
- Swami Gambhirananda, born Jatindranath Datta, Hindu religious leader
- Tanushree Dutta, actress
- Tina Dutta, actress
- Swami Vivekananda (1863–1902), born Narendranath Datta, Hindu religious leader
- Utpal Datta, Indian film critic
- Utpal Dutt (1929–1993), Indian actor, director, playwright
- Ullaskar Dutta, Indian independence activist
- Yashica Dutt, Indian writer

== In popular culture ==
In 2012, a Bengali film Dutta vs Dutta was released, directed by Anjan Dutt, the film captured family drama of three generations of a Bengali Dutta family.

== Sources ==
- Clark, Gregory (2014), The Son Also Rises: Surnames and the History of Social Mobility, Princeton University Press
- Hanks, P. (2003). Dictionary of American Family Names: 3-Volume Set. Oxford University Press, USA. ISBN 978-0-19-508137-4.
- Inden, Ronald B. (1976), Marriage and Rank in Bengali Culture: A History of Caste and Clan in Middle Period Bengal, University of California Press, p. 1, ISBN 978-0-520-02569-1
- Rigopoulos, Antonio (1998), Dattatreya: The Immortal Guru, Yogin, and Avatara : A Study of the Transformative and Inclusive Character of a Multi-Faceted Hindu Deity, State University of New York Press, pp. 27–28, ISBN 978-0-7914-3695-0
- Bandyopadhyay, Sekhar (2004), Caste, Culture, and Hegemony: Social Dominance in Colonial Bengal, Sage Publications, p. 20, ISBN 978-81-7829-316-5
- Sharma, Tej Ram (1978), Personal and Geographical Names in the Gupta Inscriptions, New Delhi: Concept Publishing Company, p. 115
- Wink, Andre (1991), Al-Hind, the Making of the Indo-Islamic World, Volume 1, Brill Academic Publishers, p. 269, ISBN 978-90-04-09509-0
