= Botler AI =

Canadian Artificial Intelligence Company

Botler AI is a Montreal-based Canadian Artificial Intelligence company that helps users navigate the legal system. Launched in 2017 by Amir Morv and Ritika Dutt, Botler offers a free online tool which provides users who are unaware of their legal rights with information and guidance.

Botler is known for its role in unveiling misconduct in the Government of Canada's procurement practices. Botler's findings have prompted numerous investigations, including by the Royal Canadian Mounted Police.

== History ==
Botler's first AI was trained on over 300,000 U.S. and Canadian legal documents to help individuals identify and enforce their legal rights, without fear of judgment.

Launched during the height of the #MeToo movement, the tool initially focused on sexual harassment with a goal of creating "a general artificial intelligence that would help the average person with any legal issue."

=== Department of Justice Canada ===
In 2020, Botler launched an expanded misconduct detection system in the form of an anonymous chatbot which provided users with an explanation of the law and relevant resources.

In March 2021, the Minister of Justice and Attorney General of Canada announced the Government of Canada's support for Botler AI to assist complainants of sexual harassment in the workplace. The initiative, entitled Botler for Citizens and implemented with the support of the Department of Justice Canada, established an Artificial Intelligence-powered hybrid legal service delivery model.

== Notable cases ==
On October 4, 2023, the RCMP confirmed to The Globe and Mail that they "are investigating a file referred from the CBSA (Canada Border Services Agency) that is based on allegations brought to their attention by Botler".

In 2019, GCStrategies's managing partner, Kristian Firth, reached out to Botler on behalf of his client, the CBSA, to solicit their misconduct detection chatbot. After interactions with GCStrategies, Dalian Enterprises and Coradix Technology Consulting, the three main contractors involved in developing the controversial ArriveCAN app, Dutt and Morv alerted the CBSA to questionable contracting practices in federal government procurement in September, 2021, and again in November, 2022.

In response to Botler's November 2022 report, the CBSA launched an internal review and referred the matter to the RCMP. During testimony before a parliamentary committee, the CBSA's President stated that the CBSA investigation to date has raised some concerns and shows "that there was a pattern of persistent collaboration between certain officials and GCStrategies... to circumvent or ignore certain established processes and roles and responsibilities".

The Auditor General of Canada, which extended its study into ArriveCAN following the Botler revelations, found that GCStrategies was directly involved in setting narrow terms for a request for proposal for a $25-million government contract it ultimately won. The firm, which has just two employees, charges the government a commission of between 15 per cent and 30 per cent of each contract's value.

The Office of the Procurement Ombudsman of Canada found "numerous examples" where GCStrategies "had simply copied and pasted" the required work experience to meet contracting requirements.

To date, more than a dozen probes have been launched into the matter, including by the government, parliamentary committees, independent watchdogs and law-enforcement agencies.

On April 17, 2024, GCStrategies' Firth was the first person summoned in over a century to answer questions before Members of Parliament in the House of Commons. During his appearance, Firth testified that the RCMP had raided "my property to obtain electronic goods surrounding the Botler allegations".

=== Government of Canada Reforms ===
One day after The Globe reported that the RCMP is investigating allegations of misconduct, the federal government responded by announcing new guidelines from the Treasury Board of Canada aimed at cutting back on the use of private consultants and that outsourcing contracts were under examination.

Public Services and Procurement Canada (PSPC) invalidated and replaced all master level user agreements with government client departments in November 2023. The agreements set out the conditions for access to select Professional Services methods of supply which are used for outsourcing.

In March 2024, PSPC announced its suspension of the respective security statuses of GCStrategies, Dalian and Coradix, barring them from participating in all federal procurements. Records show that the total value of contracts awarded to the three companies amounts to more than $1 Billion.
