= Jatra Mohan Sengupta =

Bengali lawyer and politician (1850–1919)

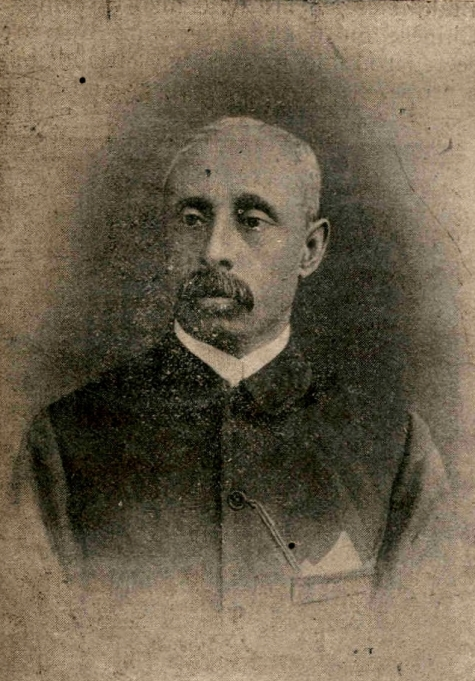

Jatra Mohan Sengupta or Jatramohan Sen (1850-1919) was a Bengali lawyer and politician.

== Early life ==
Sengupta was born on 30 July 1850 in Barama, Chandanaish Upazila, Chittagong District, Bengal Presidency, British Raj. His father, Trahiram Sen, was an Ayurvedic physician. He graduated from Chittagong Government School (now Chittagong Collegiate School) in 1868 and from Chittagong College in 1870. He completed further studies at the St. Paul's Cathedral Mission College in Kolkata. He started working the Chittagong commissioner office but left soon after to pursue a law degree. While studying at law school he worked as the headmaster of a mission school. In 1876, he completed his law degree and joined the Chittagong District Bar.

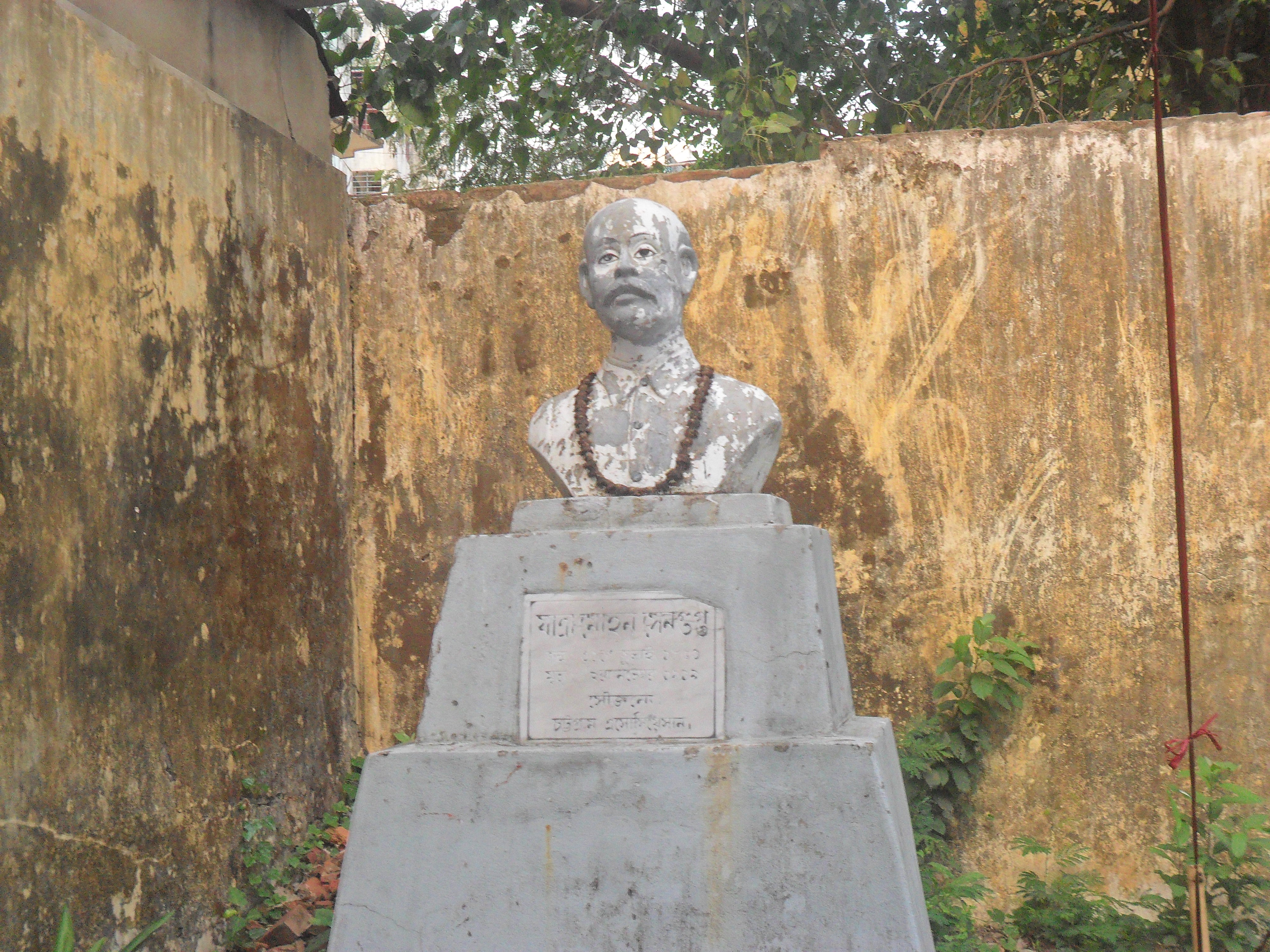
Bust Of Jatra Mohan Sengupta in JM Sen hall

== Career ==
Sengupta worked as a lawyer throughout the Bengal Presidency. He joined the Indian National Congress which marked his entry in to politics. In 1898, he was elected to the Bengal Legislative Council. He was elected to the Chittagong Municipality and the Chittagong District Board. He served in the governing body of Chittagong College. He presided over a meeting of the Indian National Congress held in Mymensingh. He helped organize the Bangiya Pradeshik Sahitya Sammelan in Chittagong which was president over by Akshay Chandra Sarkar. He established the Dr. Khastagir Government Girls' High School, named after his father-in-law, in Chittagong. He established J. M. Sen High School in 1913 named after himself (Jatra Mohan Sen School). He established Barama Trahi Menaka High School, named after his parents, in Chittagong. He also established a school named after Binodini, his wife. He established the Jatra Mohan Sen Hall. In 1895, he established a Brahma Mandir.

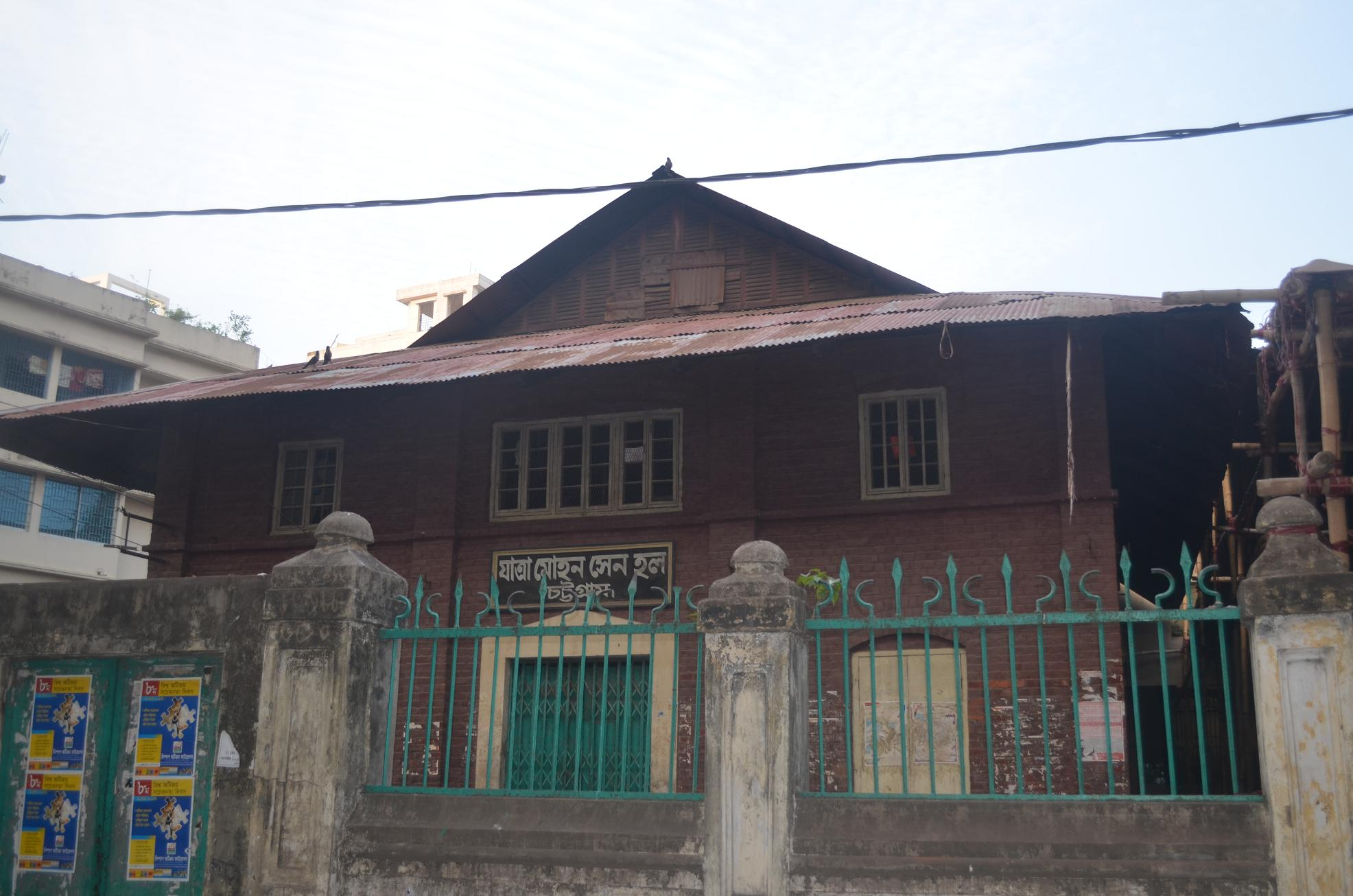
Jatra Mohan Sen Hall

== Death ==
Sengupta died on 2 November 1919 in Kolkata, West Bengal, British India. His son, Jatindra Mohan Sengupta, became a famous politician of Bengal.
