= Kshetra Collective =

New Zealand Indian artist collective

- Formation: 2022
- Headquarters: New Zealand

The Kshetra Collective is a creative collective of diverse multimedia New Zealand artists of Indian heritage. The collective is made up of Tiffany Singh, Shruti Yatri, Mandrika Rupa, Jacob Rajan, Rafik Patel, Sarah Dutt and Mandy Rupa-Reid. The collective formed and held their first exhibition in 2022. Artists in the Kshetra Collective span disciplines of painting, dance, film, theatre, installation, architecture and spatial design.

The growing collective aims to showcase a diverse range of experiences, stories and identities of New Zealand Indians, not dictated by a specific group, language or religion to express the Indian diasporic experience. The collective have taken part in Diwali celebrations involving the community at Auckland Art Gallery.

The name Kshetra is Sanskrit, meaning sacred or hallowed ground.

== Members ==
- Tiffany Singh (installation)
- Shruti Yatri (painting)
- Mandrika Rupa (film)
- Jacob Rajan (theatre)
- Rafik Patel (spatial design)
- Sarah Dutt (painting & rangoli)
- Mandy Rupa-Reid (dance)

== Exhibitions ==
=== A Place to Stand ===
The Kshetra Collective curated their first exhibition, A Place to Stand, at the Te Taunga Community Hub at Tāmaki Paenga Hira, Auckland War Memorial Museum, which opened on 15 May 2022. This was the first ever exhibition of contemporary New Zealand Indian art in New Zealand. The exhibition explores the question, what is contemporary New Zealand Indian art? Public programming alongside the exhibition included an artist panel discussion, an interactive rangoli activation and classical dance activations.

=== Invisible Narratives ===
The exhibition Invisible Narratives: Contemporary Indian Creatives in Aotearoa, was held at New Zealand Portrait Gallery Te Pūkenga Whakaata in Wellington from September to November 2023. This exhibition explores the South Pacific Indian diaspora through telling migrant stories and challenging prejudices. This exhibition was funded through a grant from Creative New Zealand.
