= Jatindra Mohan Sengupta =

Indian politician (1885–1933)

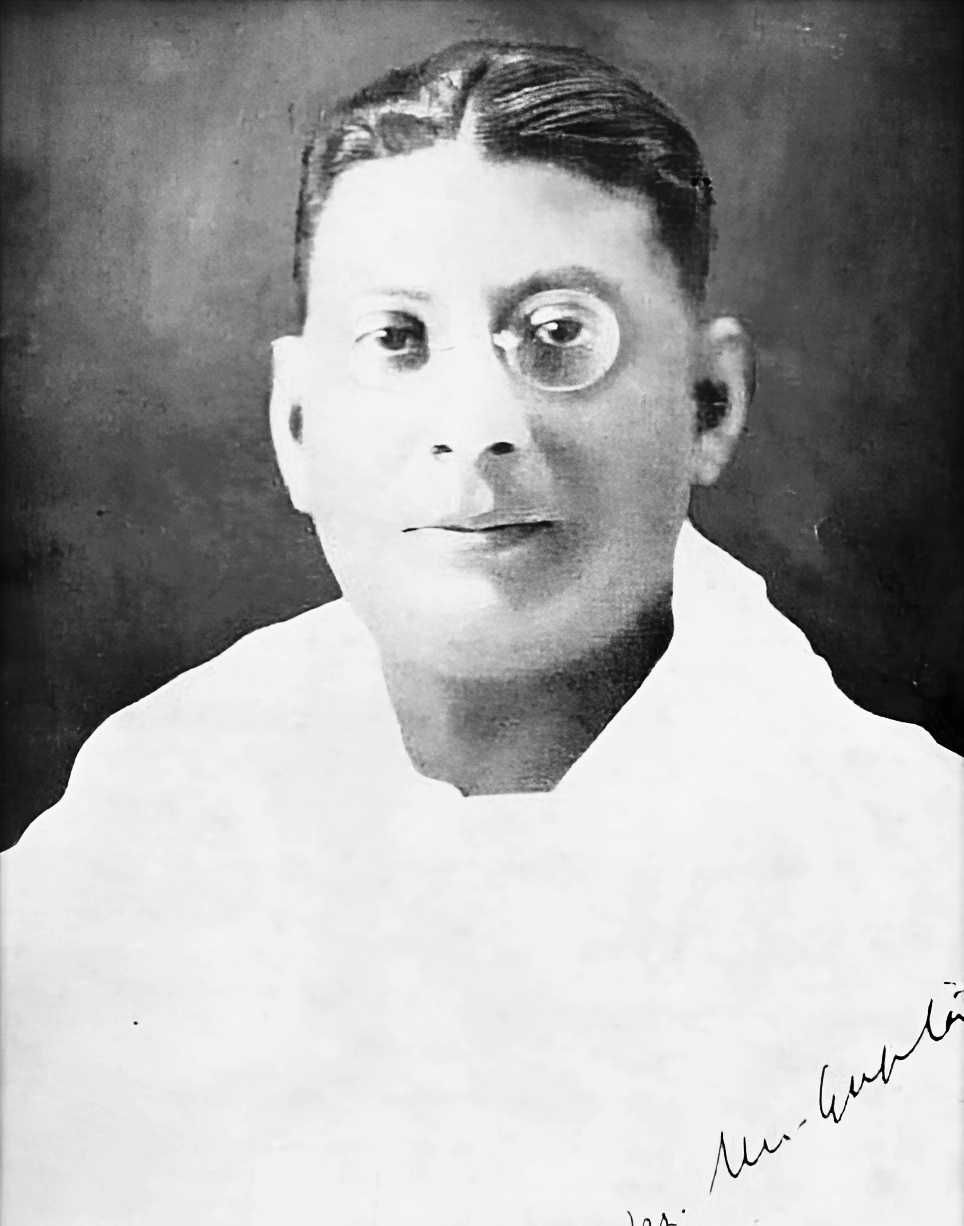
- Born: 22 February 1885; Chittagong, Bengal Presidency, British India
- Died: 23 July 1933 (aged 48); Ranchi, Bihar and Orissa Province, British India
- Education: Downing College, Cambridge
- Occupation: Lawyer
- Spouse(s): Edith Ellen Gray (later known as Nellie Sengupta)

Jatindra Mohan Sengupta (22 February 1885 – 23 July 1933) was an Indian revolutionary against British rule. He was arrested several times by the British police. In 1933, he died in a prison located in Ranchi, India.

Sengupta studied at Hare School, Calcutta, and Presidency College, Calcutta. After that he travelled to England, where he studied law at Downing College, Cambridge. During his stay there, he met and married Edith Ellen Gray, later known as Nellie Sengupta. He was elected president of the Cambridge Majlis in 1908. After returning to India, he started a legal practice. He also joined in Indian politics, becoming a member of the Indian National Congress and participating in the Non-Cooperation Movement. Eventually, he gave up his legal practice in favour of his political commitment.

== Early life ==
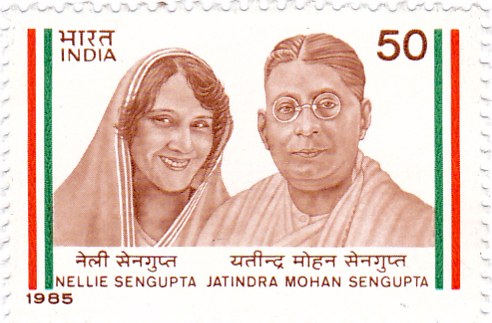
Nellie and Jatindra Mohan Sengupta on a 1985 stamp of India

Jatindra Mohan Sengupta was born on 22 February 1885 to a prominent land-owning (zamindar) family of Barama, in Chittagong district of British India (now in Chittagong, Bangladesh). His father, Jatra Mohan Sengupta, was an advocate and a member of the Bengal Legislative Council.

Sengupta became a student of the Presidency College in Calcutta. After completing his university studies, he went to England in 1904 to acquire a bachelor's degree in law. While in England, he met his future wife, Edith Ellen Gray, who is now better known as Nellie Sengupta.

== Career ==
After being awarded his degree in law, Sengupta was called to the Bar at the Gray's Inn in England and then returned with his wife to India, where he began practicing law as a barrister. In 1911, he represented Chittagong in the Bengal Provincial Conference at Faridpur. This was the beginning of his political career. Later, he joined the Indian National Congress. He also organised the employees of the Burmah Oil Company to form a union.

In 1921, Sengupta became the chairman of the Bengal Reception Committees of the Indian National Congress. That same year, during a strike at the Burmah Oil Company, he was also serving as the secretary of the employees' union. He abandoned his legal practise due to his commitment to political work, particularly related to the Non-Cooperation Movement led by Mohandas Karamchand Gandhi. In 1923, he was selected as a member of the Bengal Legislative Council. He along with Subhas Chandra Bose and Birendranath Sasmal, was regarded as one of the three foremost Lieutenants of Das in Bengal.

In 1925, after the death of Chitta Ranjan Das, Sengupta was elected president of the Bengal Swaraj Party. He also became president of the Bengal Provincial Congress Committee. He was mayor of Calcutta from 10 April 1929 to 29 April 1930. In March 1930, at a public meeting in Rangoon, he was arrested on charges of provoking people against the government and opposing the India–Burma separation.

In 1931, Sengupta went to England to attend the Round Table Conference, supporting the position of the Indian National Congress. He submitted pictures of police atrocities committed by the British to control the Chittagong rebellion, which shook the British government.

== Death ==
Sengupta was repeatedly arrested due to his political activities. In January 1932, he was arrested and detained in Poona and then in Darjeeling. Later, he was transferred to prison in Ranchi. There, his health started to decline, and he died on 23 July 1933.

== Influence ==
Because of his popularity and contribution to the Indian freedom movement, Jatindra Mohan Sengupta is affectionately remembered by people of Bengal with the honorific Deshpriya or Deshapriya, meaning "beloved of the country". In many criminal cases he defended the nationalist revolutionaries in the court and saved them from the gallows. He pled for Surya Sen, Ananta Singh, and Ambika Chakrabarty in the Pahartali trial and also saved a young revolutionary, Premananda Dutta, who had been accused in the case relating to the murder of Inspector Prafulla Chakraborty. In 1985, a postal stamp was issued by the Indian government in memory of Sengupta and his wife, Nellie.

== Gallery ==
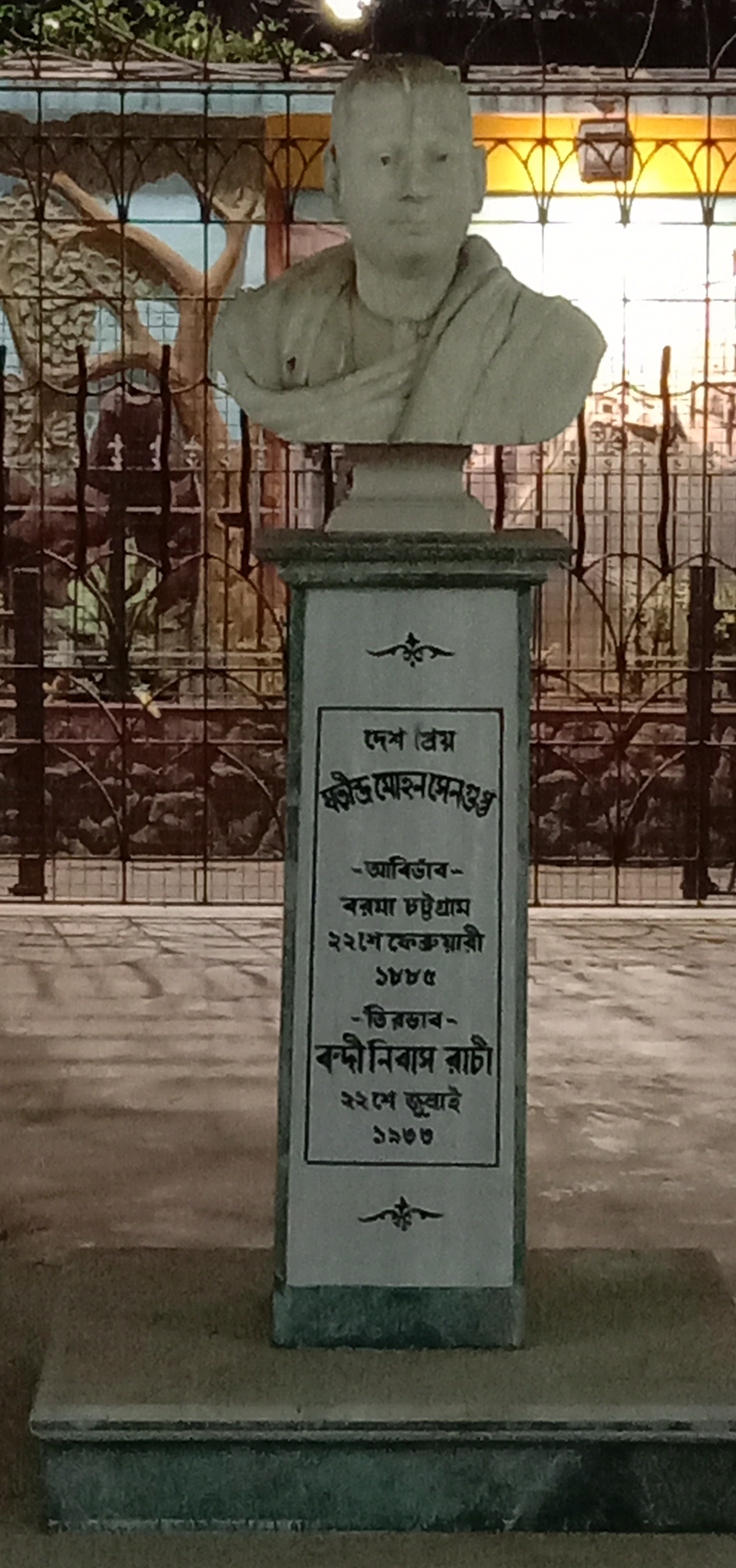
Bust of Jatindra Mohan Sengupta at his Memorial in Kolkata
