= Our Casuarina Tree =

1882 poem by Toru Dutt

Our Casuarina Tree is a poem published in 1881 by Toru Dutt [Ancient Ballads and Legends of Hindustan], an Indian poet. In this poem Toru Dutt celebrates the majesty of the casuarina tree that she used to see by her window, and remembers her happy childhood days spent under it and revives her memories with her beloved siblings.

== Summary ==
The poem begins with the description of the tree.The poet says that the creeper has wound itself around the rugged trunk of the Casuarina Tree, like a huge Python. The creeper has left deep marks on the trunk of the tree. The tree is metaphorically said as a giant due to its huge size, strength and boldness. The creeper tightly wraps around the tree, but the Casuarina tree's strength allows it to bear the intense grip, suggesting that if it were some other tree, it wouldn't have been able to withstand the creeper's binding nature. Yet, the tree wears the creeper like a scarf. The tree's own crimson colour flowers fill the boughs, adding to its beauty. During the day, birds and bees gather on the tree, and at night, the garden overflows with music. The phrase "sung darkling" likely refers to the sounds of nocturnal creatures or the melancholic tone of the music, rather than specifically nightingales, as the poet tends to mention specific animals, like the python and kokila, by name when referencing them. As the song continues, it seems endless, filling the night air till dawn. It's at this hour that human beings retreat to rest, while the tree and its inhabitants remain vibrant and alive. The poem highlights the tree's strength, beauty, and the life it supports, showcasing its majestic presence. At dawn when the poet opens her window she is delighted to see the Casuarina Tree. Mostly in winters a gray baboon is seen sitting on the crest of the tree seeing the sunrise with her younger ones leaping and playing in the tree's boughs. The shadow of the tree appears to fall on the huge water tank. Toru Dutt says that it is not because of the majestic appearance of the Casuarina Tree that it is dear to her heart and soul, but also that she along with her siblings spent happy moments under it. Toru Dutt has brought out the theme of nature as something that shares feelings with humans, that lightens the burden on the heart. The poet continues with a description of how strong the image of the tree is, even when in lands far away. Even in France and Italy (where the poet studied), she can hear the tree's lament. The poet wishes to consecrate the tree's memory and importance for the sake of those who are now dead - and looks ahead to her own death, hoping that the tree be spared obscurity (or that no-one will remember it). She immortalizes the tree through this poem like how Wordsworth sanctified the Yew trees of Borrowdale. She says "May Love defend thee from Oblivion's curse'"- expressing her wish that love shield her tree against the curse of forgetfulness(Oblivion), that the tree be remembered out of love and must be saved from the curse of forgetfulness. In the final stanza, the speaker wants to erect something in the honor of the casuarina tree. For those who were beloved, who are resting in peace, loved it. She wants the tree to live long like those trees of “Borrowdale” making a reference to Wordsworth’s “Yew-trees.” Also, she makes an attempt to distinguish the trees of England from the Casuarina tree, connecting to her varying emotions. The Casuarina tree stands for nostalgia, longing, and memory, whereas the trees of England reflect her isolation. The final lines of the poem underscore the idea of a poem as a written memory. The poet seeks “Love” to protect the tree and her poem from time’s ravage.

== Synopsis ==
Our Casuarina Tree is an autobiographical poem. While living abroad, she is pining for the scenes of her native land and reliving the memories of childhood. In the first part of the poem the poet depicts the Casuarina Tree trailed by a creeper vine like a huge python, winding round and round the rough trunk, sunken deep with scars. It reached to the height touching the very summit of stars. The Casuarina Tree stood alone unaccompanied in the compound. It was wearing the scarf of the creeper hung with crimson cluster of flowers among the boughs accompanied by the bird and swarms of bees humming around. The tree is dear to the poet because it is the solo bond between the poet's past and present. When she recalls it a chain of pleasant and poignant memories occur to her mind and again she tastes the flavour of her childhood. In her imagination she is again transported to the golden age and hears the same cries, laughter and noise of her sweet departed playmates. This tree reminds of her siblings who used to play with her under itself (Casuarina Tree).

== Analysis ==
In this poem, Toru Dutt sings glories of the Casuarina tree and describes it in detail. On the surface of it, it appears that it is all about the Casuarina tree, but actually the tree is just a medium to link the poet's past with the present. The poet remembers the tree because of the many happy memories of childhood days that are linked to it which are a source of comfort and consolation to her in another country. The poem, therefore, underlines the importance of memories in human life. The tree brings to her mind the memories of time when she used to play under it in the company of her brother and sister, both of whom are already dead. She was very close to her dead brother and sister named Abju and Aru respectively who loved the Casuarina tree very greatly. So she loves the tree greatly. But lost in the memories of her siblings who are now dead, she is looking forward to death as an acceptable thing. The memories of her brother and sister brings tears into her eyes. She hopes that the tree will be remembered for ever as the yew trees of Borrowdale immortalized by Wordsworth are still remembered. She immortalizes the tree for the sake of her loved ones by writing a poem for it.
