= Mandrika Rupa =

Indian- New Zealand filmmaker and community worker

- Born: Gujarat, India
- Known for: Filmmaker

Mandrika Rupa is an Indian- New Zealand filmmaker and community worker. She is a member of The Kshetra Collective, a diverse group of artists in New Zealand of Indian heritage.

== Biography ==
Rupa was born in Gujarat, India and moved to New Zealand in 1960. Rupa's great-grandfather, Jaga Rupa, emigrated to New Zealand in 1907 just after immigration restrictions targeted at Chinese and Indians were lifted. Jaga Rupa settled in the Waikato and became a hawker. Rupa has six siblings who were all born in New Zealand and one born in India. In 1981 Rupa's daughter Mandy Rupa-Reid was born.

Between 1986 and 1988 Rupa gained a qualification in social work.

In 1993 Rupa founded Nari Shakti, a platform for Indian women to empower one another, their communities and promote economic independence.

A trip to India in 1993 prompted Rupa's journey into filmmaking. Much of Rupa's film work explores the social implications of immigrant communities, the experiences of the South Asian diaspora and giving visibility to underrepresented voices.

== Films ==
Film	Year	Role	Description	Language
Against Her Will	2007	Pre-production	Documentary about domestic violence in the West	
Inheritance/ A lament	2006			Māori, Punjabi, English subtitles
Hidden Apartheid	2005	Director & Producer	Documentary on the caste system in India and discrimination in the United Kingdom, United States, Australia and New Zealand.	
Taamara/Sangam (The Joining of Two Peoples)	2004	Director & Writer	Accounts from Māori of the story of a group of Indian men settled in Te Uku in the early 1900s.	Māori, Hindi
Laxmi	1998	Director & Writer	Life in colonial New Zealand through an Indian diasporic lens.	English
Naya Zamana	1996	Director & Producer	A documentary about queer experiences in a family of South Pacific Indian heritage.	Hindi
Poonam	1994	Director & Writer	Documentary about three Indian women who migrated with their families to New Zealand around the 1890s.	
I'm Not Here	1994	Director		English

Rupa's short film Poonam (1994) is part of the permanent collection at the Museum of Modern Art in New York.
