= Nellie Sengupta =

English-Indian politician

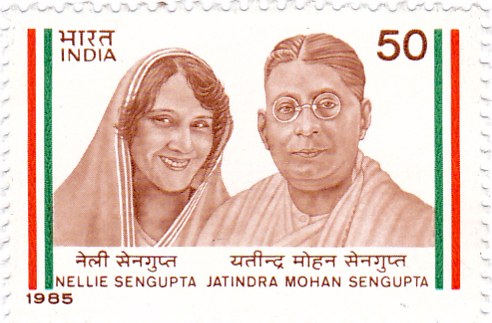
- Nellie and Jatindra Mohan Sengupta on a 1985 stamp of India

52nd President of the Indian National Congress
- In office 1933–1934
- Preceded by: Madan Mohan Malaviya
- Succeeded by: Rajendra Prasad

Personal details
- Born: Edith Ellen Gray; 12 January 1886 Cambridge, England
- Died: 23 October 1973 (aged 87) Kolkata, West Bengal, India
- Citizenship: United Kingdom (till 1947); Pakistan (1947–1971); India (1971–1973)
- Party: Indian National Congress
- Spouse: Jatindra Mohan Sengupta
- Children: 3 sons (Sishir, Amar and Anil)
- Occupation: Politician, social worker
- Awards: Padma Vibhushan (1973)

Nellie Sengupta (née Edith Ellen Gray; 12 January 1886 – 23 October 1973) was an English-Indian politician and social worker who fought for Indian Independence. She was the first woman Alderman for Calcutta and was elected president of the Indian National Congress at its 48th annual session at Calcutta in 1933.

== Family ==
Edith was the daughter of Frederick and Edith Henrietta Gray. She was born and brought up in Cambridge, where her father worked at a club. As a young girl, she fell in love with Jatindra Mohan Sengupta, a young Bengali student at Downing College who lodged at her parental home. Despite parental opposition, she married Jatindra Mohan in 1909 and returned to Calcutta with him. Nellie, as she became known, and Jatin had two sons Sishir and Anil.

== Non-Cooperation Movement ==
On returning to India, Nellie's husband Jatindra Mohan started a very successful career as a lawyer in Calcutta. In 1921 Jatindra Mohan joined the Indian freedom struggle and was Mahatma Gandhi's right-hand man in Bengal apart from being the Mayor of Calcutta for three terms and the head of the Legislative Assembly. Nellie joined her husband in participating in the Non-Cooperation Movement of 1921. After his imprisonment during the Assam-Bengal Railwaymen's strike, she forcefully protested against the District authorities imposition of a ban on assembly, addressed mass meetings and courted arrest. She defied the law by selling Khadi (hand-spun cloth) door to door. In 1931 she suffered four months' imprisonment at Delhi for addressing an unlawful assembly. Jatin was imprisoned in Ranchi and died in 1933.

== Congress president ==
During the turmoil of the Salt Satyagraha many senior Congress leaders were imprisoned. Pandit Madan Mohan Malviya the President elect of the Congress was arrested before the Calcutta Session of 1933. Nellie Sengupta was elected in his place, thus becoming the third woman, and the second European-born woman to be elected. She was elected president by the party for her contribution to the party and the country.

She was also elected as an Alderman to the Calcutta Corporation in 1933 and 1936. She was also elected on a Congress ticket to the Bengal Legislative Assembly in 1940 and 1946 from Chiitagong. During the Second World War she drew attention to the misbehaviour of foreign troops.

== Post-independence ==
=== East Pakistan ===
After independence, she chose to live in East Pakistan, in her husband's hometown of Chittagong, on the specific request of the then Indian Prime Minister Jawaharlal Nehru, who asked her to look after the interests of the Hindu minorities in East Pakistan. She was elected unopposed to the East Pakistan Legislative Assembly in 1954. She was a member of the Minority Board and played an active role in the social life of Chittagong. In 1970, she was injured at her home due to a bad fall. At the initiative of then-Indian PM Indira Gandhi, she shifted to Calcutta for medical treatment and care.

=== India ===
While in Calcutta with her family, the Pakistani government confiscated her residential mansion and other properties as enemy property under Enemy Property Act. When Bangladesh was liberated in 1971, she continued to live on in Calcutta while briefly returning to Chittagong in 1972. She continued her treatment in Calcutta, where she was operated on and all medical expenses being paid for by the Indian government. She was accorded a tremendous public reception in Calcutta and was honoured by the government with Padma Vibhushan by the Indian government for her lifetime contribution to freedom, humanity and society. She died in Calcutta in 1973.

== Awards ==
- Padma Vibhushan, 1973
