= Jacob Rajan =

New Zealand actor and playwright

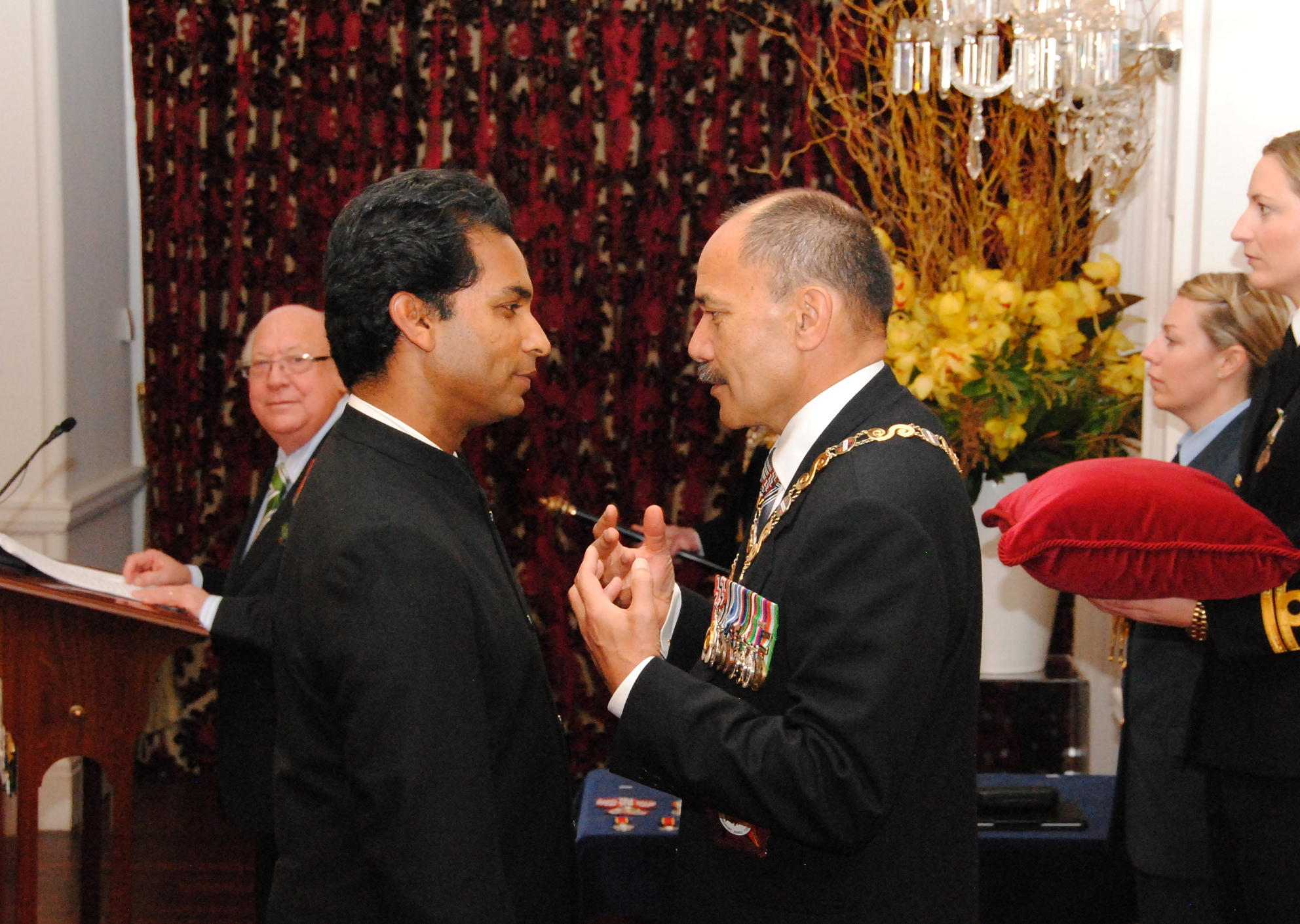
- Rajan's investiture as a Member of the New Zealand Order of Merit by the governor-general, Sir Jerry Mateparae (right) on 23 May 2013. In the 2013 New Year Honours, Rajan was appointed a Member of the New Zealand Order of Merit for services to theatre.
- Citizenship: New Zealand

Jacob Rajan MNZM is a New Zealand playwright and actor. His highly successful plays include the trilogy Krishnan's Dairy, The Candlestick Maker and The Pickle King. Another work was The Dentist's Chair. In 2002, he received the prestigious Laureate Art Award. All of Rajan's plays, except his first, Krishnan's Dairy, were originally produced for his theatre company, Indian Ink Theatre Company, and co-written with director/writer Justin Lewis, co-founder of Indian Ink.

Rajan was born in Malaysia to Indian parents, and migrated to New Zealand when he was four years old. After studying science at the University of Otago, he went to teacher's college, then studied acting and at Toi Whakaari New Zealand Drama School. He graduated in 1994 and has since appeared in different stage and screen productions as well as touring internationally. He appeared as Dr Ashwin Bhashar in the television soap Shortland Street.

With Justin Lewis, Rajan co-founded the Indian Ink Theatre Company in 1996. His most significant works are with this company and include the trilogy of plays which explore Indian themes, characters and stories. Krishnan's Dairy, The Candlestick Maker and The Guru Of Chai have been extremely popular plays in NZ. In 1999, Krishnan's Dairy won the Edinburgh Festival Fringe First award. The Pickle King won the same award in 2003. Other work includes Kiss the Fish.

Rajan says he "writes the stories that move him – they might happen to have Indian elements just because that's his frame of reference, but he doesn't set out to write Indian plays."

Rajan is a key member of The Kshetra Collective.

== Plays ==
- Krishnan's Dairy
- The Candlestick Maker
- The Pickle King
- The Dentist's Chair
- Guru of Chai
- Kiss the Fish
- Paradise, or the Impermanence of Icecream
