= Maniktala Christian Cemetery =

Cemetery in West Bengal

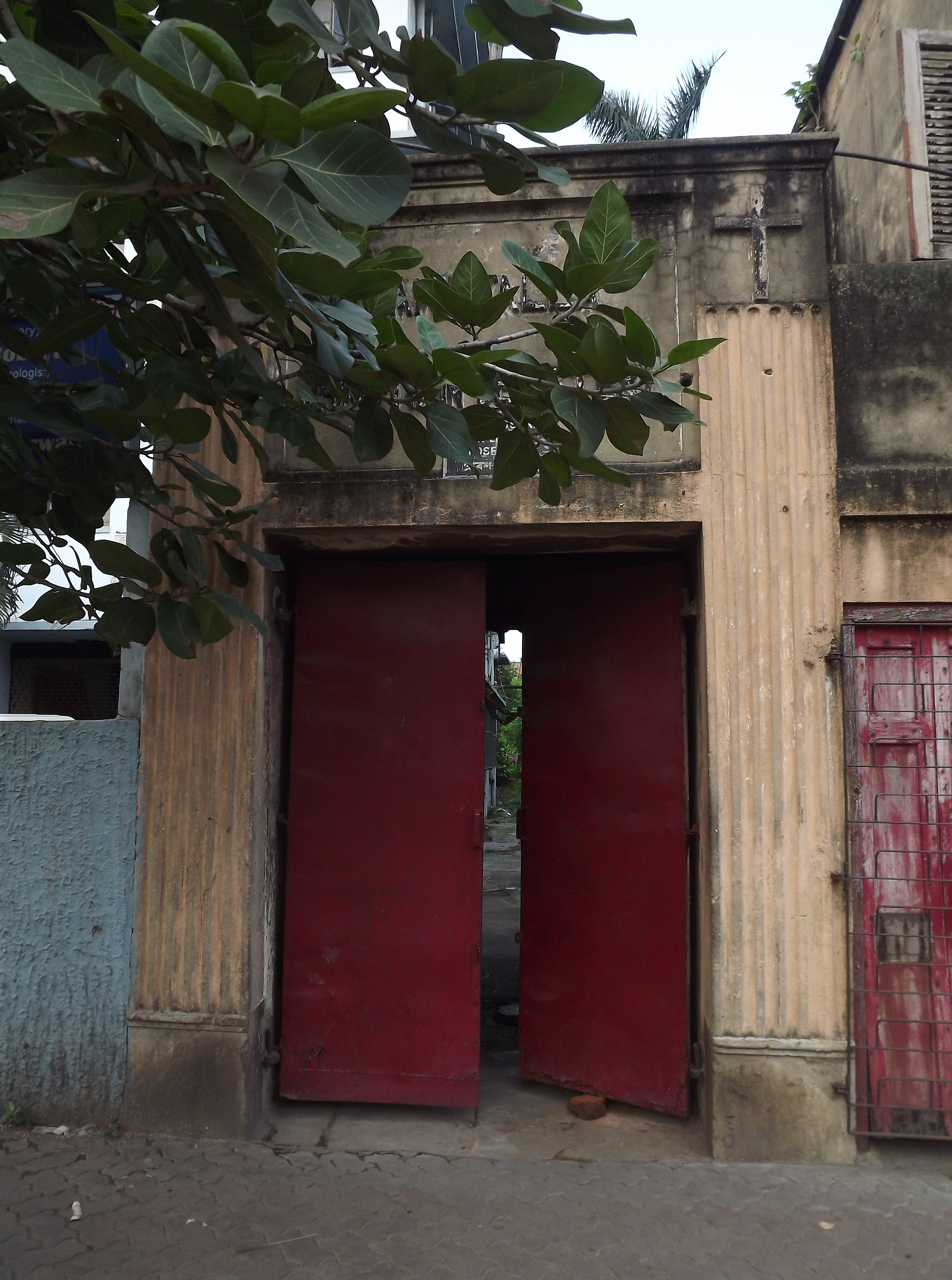
- Entrance of Maniktala Christian Cemetery

Details
- Location: Maniktala, Kolkata, West Bengal
- Country: India
- Type: Christian cemetery

Maniktala Christian Cemetery or Church Mission Society Cemetery is a historic Christian cemetery situated at Maniktala in Kolkata, West Bengal, India. This cemetery has been undertaken by the West Bengal Heritage Commission.

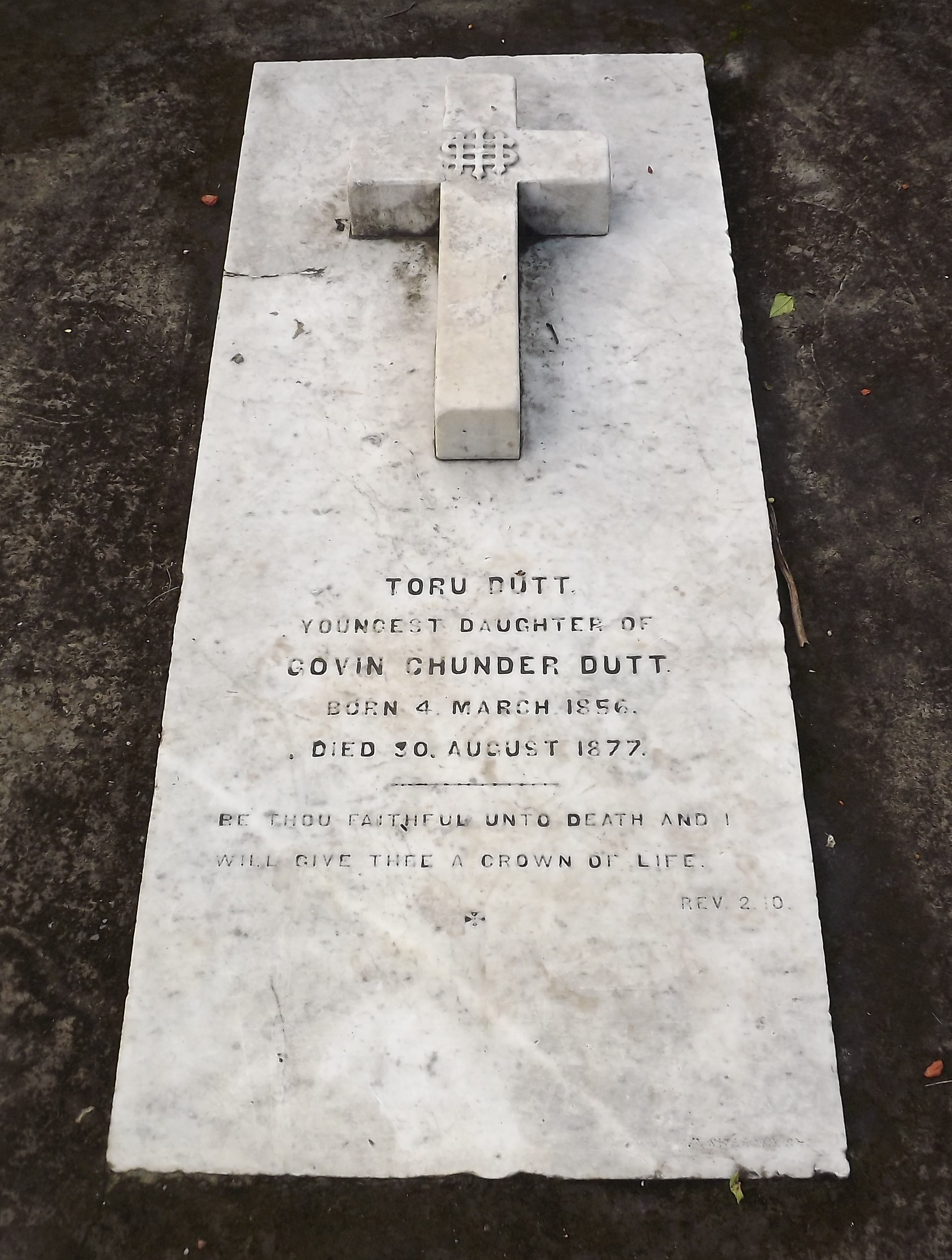
Grave of Toru Dutt

== History ==
The cemetery was established during the nineteenth century for the Christian communities of North Kolkata. Members of the Rambagan Dutta family were buried in the cemetery including Toru Dutt, the first Indian to have written a novel in English.

== Gallery ==
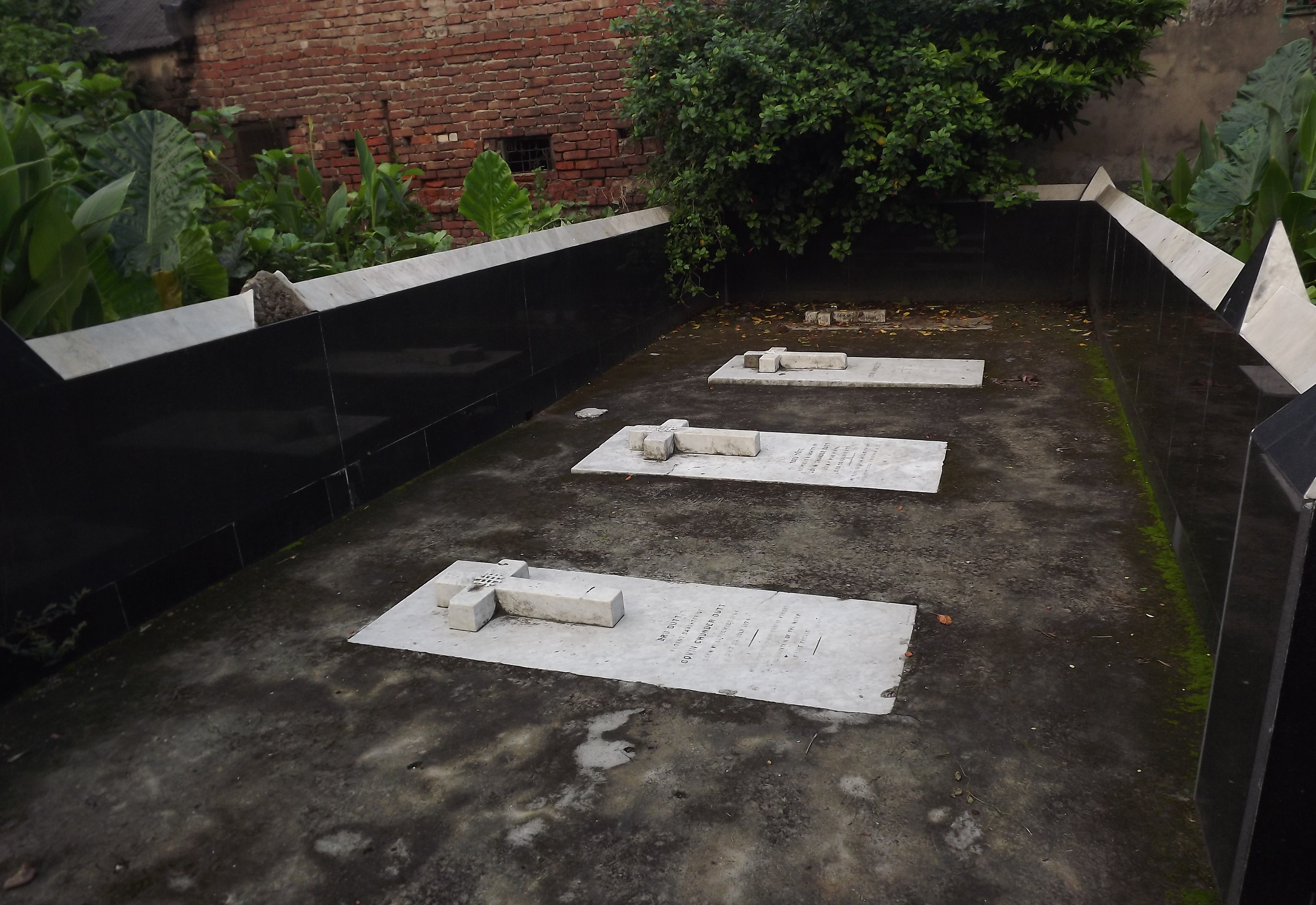

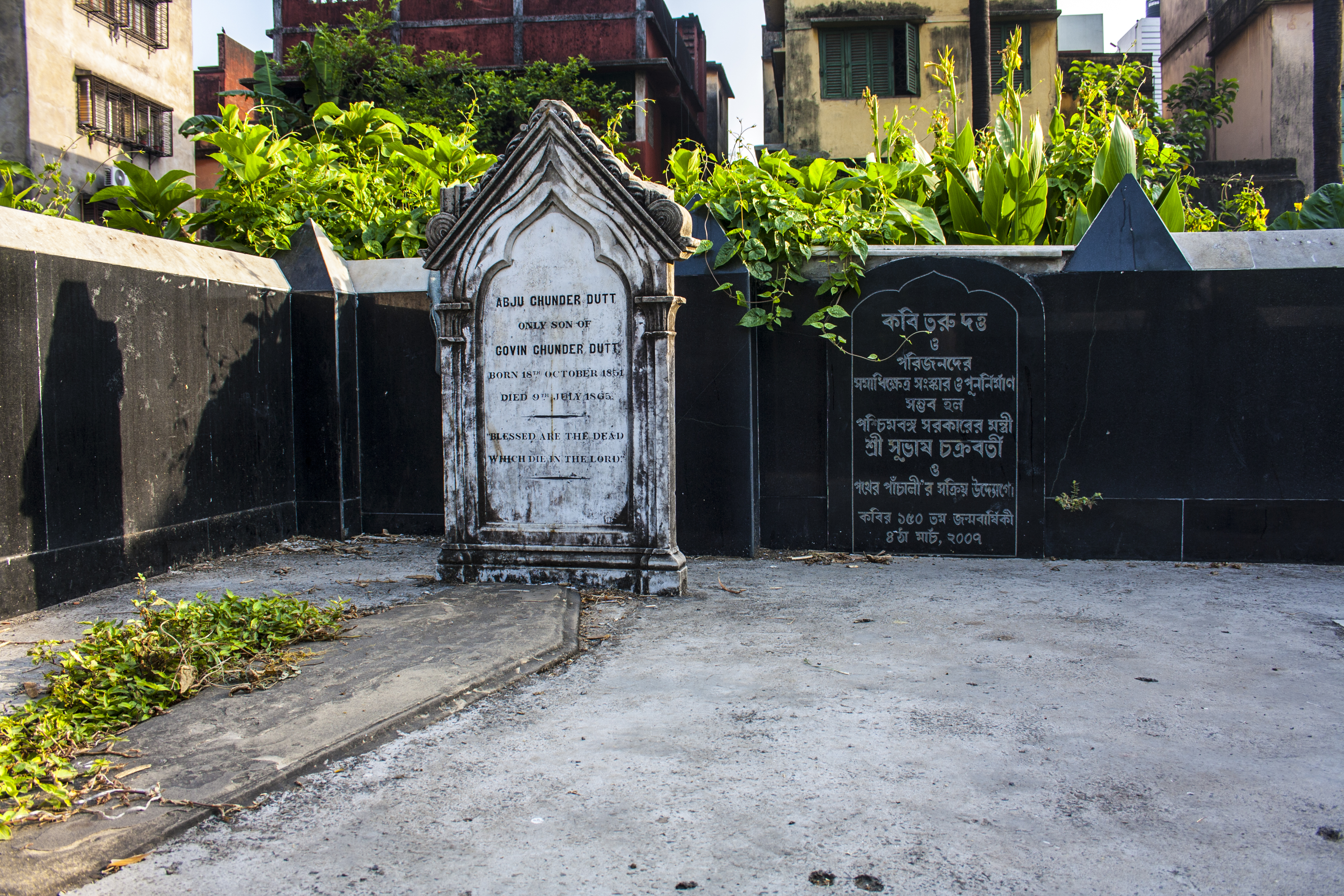

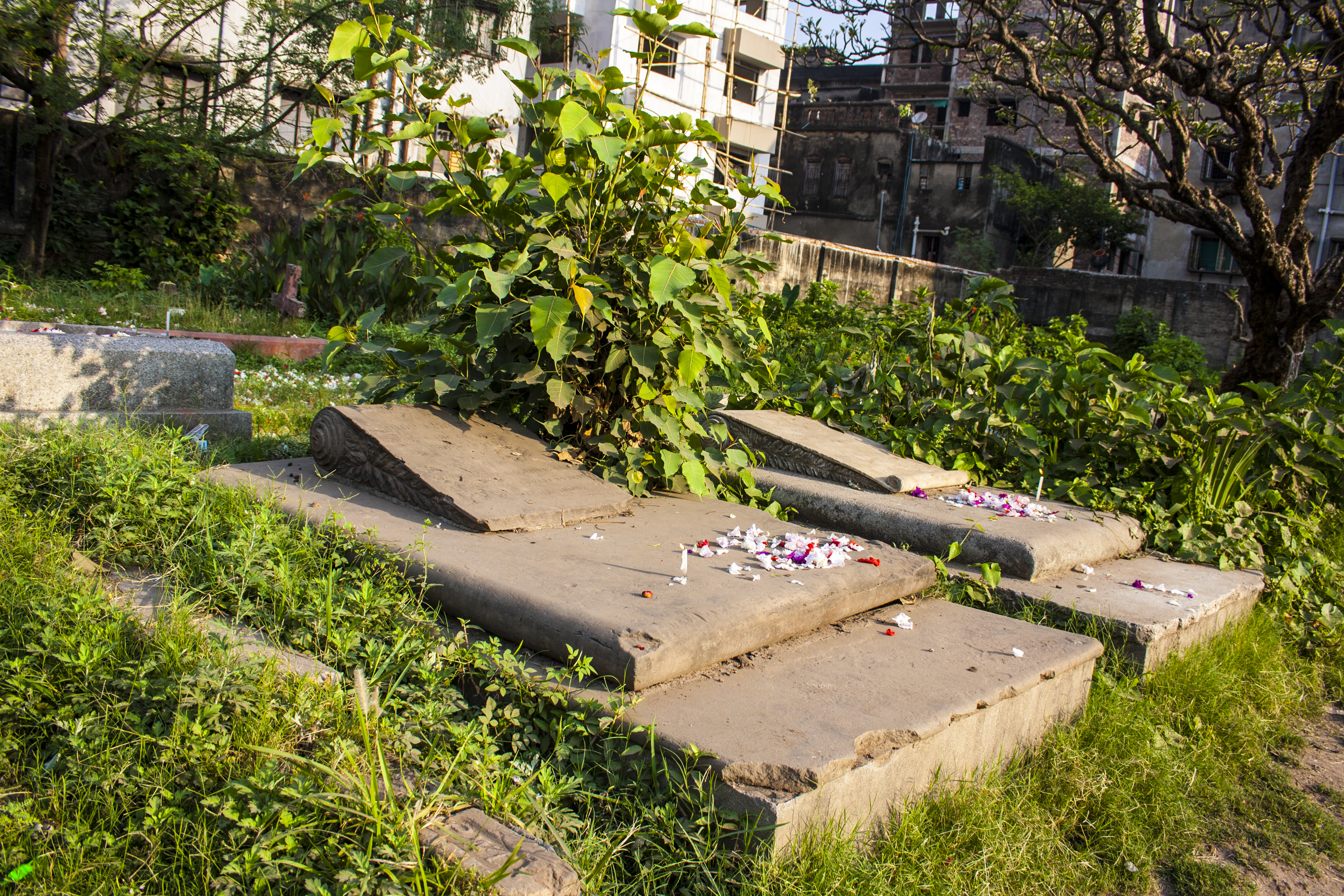

== See also ==
- Scottish Cemetery at Calcutta
- Greek Cemetery, Kolkata
- Lower Circular Road cemetery
