= Tiffany Singh =

New Zealand artist

- Born: 1978 (age 47–48); New Zealand
- Education: Elam School of Fine Arts
- Awards: New Generation Award

Tiffany Singh (born 1978) is a New Zealand artist.

== Background ==
Singh was born in 1978 in Auckland, New Zealand and is of Indian and Pacific descent. She graduated from the Elam School of Fine Arts with a Bachelor of Fine Arts in 2008.

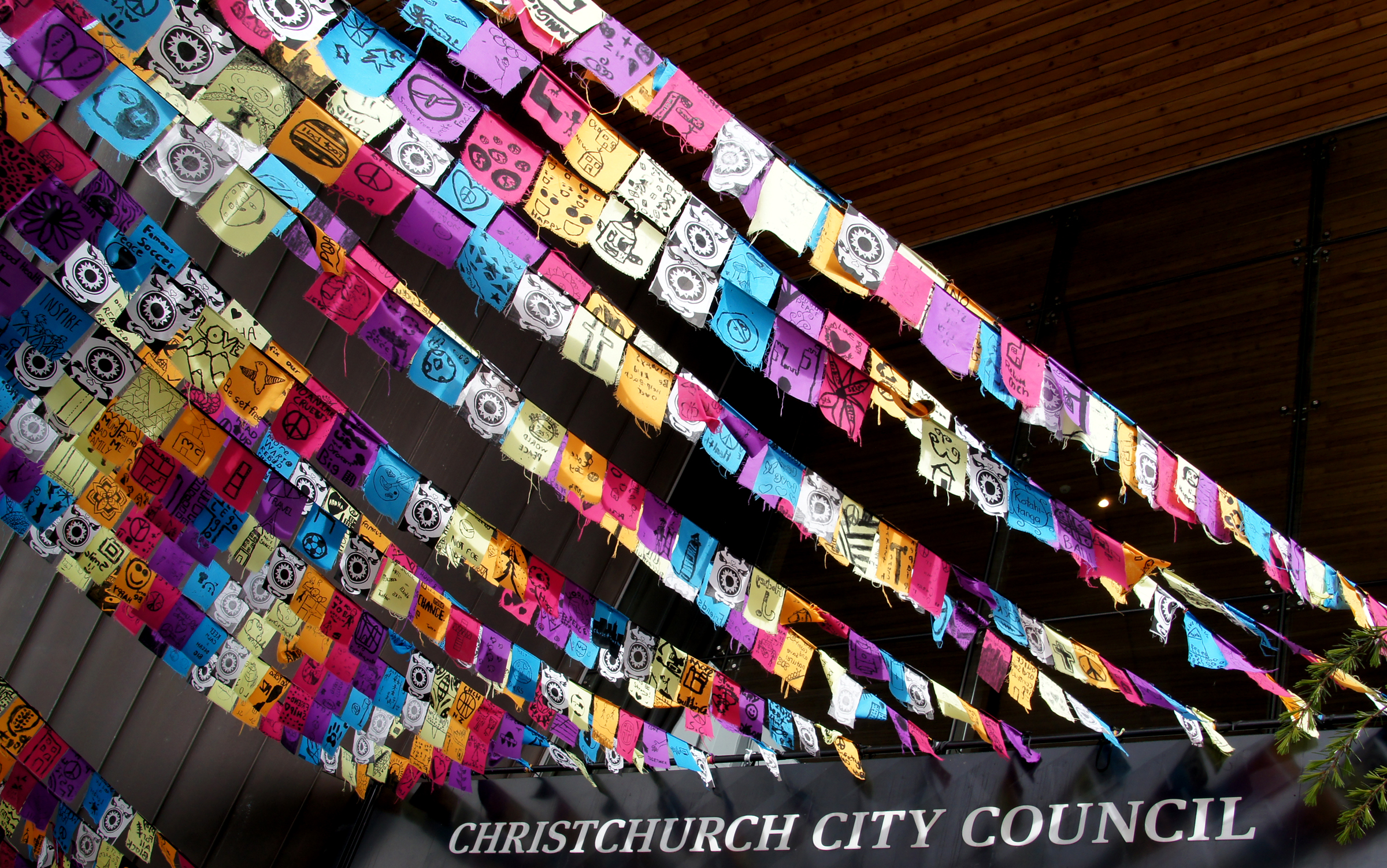
Tiffany Singh, Fly Me Up To Where You Are (2013)

== Career ==
Singh is an installation artist that explores community outreach and cultural preservation. Her work, Fly Me Up To Where You Are, received an award in 2013 from the Human Rights Commission.

In 2017, Singh received the New Generation Award from the Arts Foundation of New Zealand.

Singh has received residencies at the Taiwan Artists Village (2017, from Asia New Zealand Foundation), Montalvo Arts Centre (2013, California), and McCahon House Residency (2014, Titirangi).

Singh is represented by the Melanie Roger Gallery.

Singh is a founding member of The Kshetra Collective.

=== Exhibitions ===
- 2017, The Journey of a Million Miles Begins with One Step, Headland Sculpture on the Gulf, Waiheke Island
- 2017, The Singing Raintree, Splore Festival, Auckland
- 2012, The Chinese Horoscope Show, Enjoy Public Art Gallery, Wellington (group show)
- 2012, 18th Biennale of Sydney (group show)
- 2011, Medi(t)ation: Contemporary Asian Art Biennial, National Taiwan Museum of Fine Arts (group show)
- 2011, Know on the Sky Listen to the Sound, Enjoy Public Art Gallery, Wellington
- 2011, Preserve, Papakura Art Gallery (group show)
- 2011, Stealing the Senses, Govett-Brewster Art Gallery, New Plymouth (group show)
- 2010, Knowing Me, Knowing You, Artspace, Auckland (group show)

== Contribution to education ==
The partnership project between Singh and the Auckland Resettled Community Coalition (ARCC), The Journey of a Million Miles Begins with One Step (exhibited as part of Headland Sculpture on the Gulf, 2017) contributed to a research project on learning 'in' intense environments and less distinct educational settings led by Dr Sarah Healy from The University of Melbourne, Australia. The following peer-reviewed publications feature the significant contribution to knowledge about response-able pedagogy made possible by Tiffany Singh's involvement:

- Sarah Healy & Dianne Mulcahy (2021) Pedagogic affect: assembling an affirming ethics, Pedagogy, Culture & Society, 29:4, 555-572, https://doi.org/10.1080/14681366.2020.1768581
- Dianne Mulcahy & Sarah Healy (2021) Ordinary affect and its powers: assembling pedagogies of response-ability, Pedagogy, Culture & Society, https://doi.org/10.1080/14681366.2021.1950201
- Sarah Healy (2019) Cracking open pedagogy: Learning 'in' intense environments [PhD Thesis, The University of Melbourne] https://hdl.handle.net/11343/230614
