= Rasamay Dutt =

Bengali educationist of British India (1779–1854)

Rasamoy Dutta
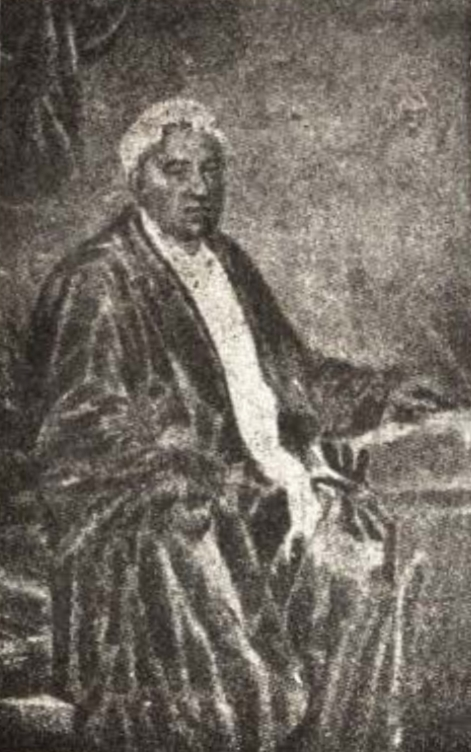
- Born: Not recognized as a date. Years must have 4 digits (use leading zeros for years < 1000). Calcutta, Bengal Presidency, British India
- Died: 14 May 1854 (aged 74–75); Calcutta, Bengal Presidency, British India
- Occupation: Educationist
- Organization: Asiatic Society
- Known for: Co-founder of Presidency College, Kolkata
- Relatives: Toru Dutt (granddaughter)

Rasamay Dutt or Russomoy Dutt (1779 – 14 May 1854) was a Bengali educationist of British India during the Bengali Renaissance. He was the co-founder of Hindu School, Kolkata. Bengali poet Toru Dutt was his granddaughter.

== Early life ==
Dutt was born in Rambagan, Kolkata. His father, Nilmani Dutt, was the founder of Dutt family. Rasamay Dutt started his profession by business and thereafter became a clerk and even became a judge of the Small Cause Court, Calcutta As such, he was the first Indian puisne judge of India. He was also the first Indian member of the Asiatic Society.

== Social works ==
Dutt was a linguist with special efficiency in English language. He was one of the founders of Hindu School in Kolkata and also set up Hindu College presently Presidency University with Ram Mohan Roy, Radhakanta Deb, David Hare. He became secretary of Council of Education and the first principal of Sanskrit college. After certain difficulties with Ishwar Chandra Vidyasagar he resigned from the post at Sanskrit College. Dutta was popular for his enormous contribution to poor students as a member of Kolkata School Book Society. He was also engaged with the Civil Society Movement, Anti press activities of state and support the jury trial system in judicial works in India.

== Family ==
From Rasamay Dutt's father sprang the famous Dutt family of Rambagan, Calcutta. Rasamay had two younger brothers, Harish and Pitambar; and five sons, Kissen, Kylas, Govin, Hur and Greece. His youngest brother Pitambar's sons were Ishan Chunder and Shoshee Chunder. Ishan was the father of author Jogesh Chandra Dutt and author-cum-administrator Romesh Chunder Dutt. Rasamay's younger four sons were notable authors, Kylas being the first Indian author of a fictional work in English. Govin was the father of poet Toru Dutt. British Communist leader Rajani Palme Dutt also descended from this family.
