= Premananda Dutta =

Indian revolutionary

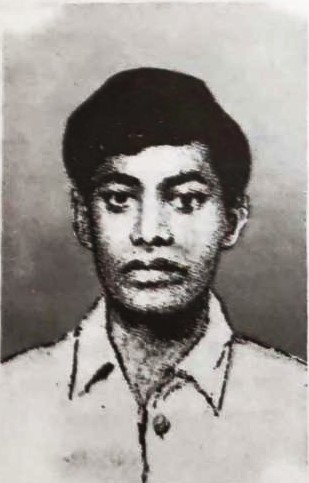
- Premananda Dutta
- Born: Chittagong, British India
- Died: 1950s Ranchi, India
- Occupations: Port Preventive Officer, Chittagong Port
- Known for: Indian Freedom Struggle
- Parent: Harish Chandra Dutta (father)

Premananda Dutta was a Bengali revolutionary and activist of Indian freedom struggle attached with Chittagong Rebellion against the British Government in India.

== Early life ==
Dutta was born in Chittagong (Chattagram) in British India presently in Bangladesh. His father Harish Chandra Dutta was an Acharya of Brahmo Samaj. After passing from Chittagong College he joined in the post of Port Preventive Officer in Port of Chittagong. In the call of Deshbandhu Chittaranjan Das he left the job and took part in Non-cooperation movement subsequently became imprisoned for this. Dutta also took active part in the strike of Assam Bengal Railway in support of the movement of tea garden labours against British atrocities. For such nationalist political activities he went to the jail several times. In 1923, Dutta along with some youth fellows made a gymnasium and club in Chittagong town which was actually the secret den of freedom fighters.

== Revolutionary activities ==
In 1930 he attracted to the line armed revolution led by Masterda Surya Sen in Chittagong region. Since Dutta was a school friend of veteran activist Ananta Singh he joined in revolutionary action group with Singh's guidance. Mainly he took charge to keep the arms, bomb in safe custody hiding from the eye of police intelligence. In the meanwhile one sub-inspector of Intelligence Branch, Prafulla Chakrabarty caught Ananta Singha and causes repeated disturbance of the works of revolutionary group. Dutta with intention to take revenge, befriended with Prafulla and on 24 May 1924 he met that inspector in Chittagong Paltan Field and killed him by a Revolver.

== Trial ==
Before death the sub inspector was able to give a Dying declaration to local influential person named Roy Bahadur Satish Roy. But at the time of trial in the court Barrister Jatindra Mohan Sengupta defended the case on behalf of the accused Dutta. While cross examination the Defense counsel established that Dutta was not guilty at all, in the Appeal case of Calcutta High Court he became released also.

== Death ==
Dutta was again arrested in No. 1 Bengal Ordinance Act and sent behind the bars. In the prison, he suffered from mental and psychological disorder due to negligence and torture by the jail authority. For treatment, the government sent him to Ranchi.
