= Shanta Dutta =

Indian medical researcher

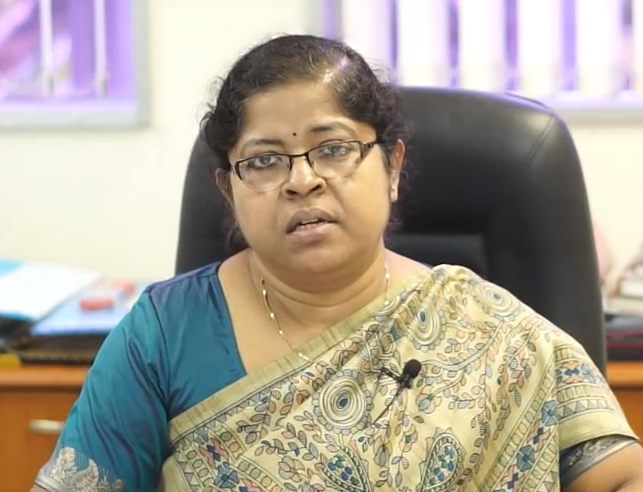
- Dutta in 2018
- Born: Kolkata
- Citizenship: Indian
- Education: Calcutta National Medical College (M.B.B.S.) Kasturba Medical College (M.D.) Fukuoka Medical School, Japan (Ph.D)
- Known for: Enteric and other infectious disease research
- Spouse: A. Chattopadhyay
- Children: 1
- Awards: RONPAKU Fellowship of JSPS in 2001; Life Time Achievement Award of IAAM in 2017; Sera Bangali Award of Star Ananda in 2024
- Scientific career
- Fields: Tropical Enteric Diseases, Infectious diseases, Medical Microbiology & Immunology
- Workplaces: ICMR-National Institute for Research in Bacterial Infections

Shanta Dutta is an Indian medical researcher, who has expertise in infectious diseases especially in enteric diseases like acute and chonic watery diarrhoea, bloody mucoid diarrhoea, cholera, typhoid fever, shigellosis, rotavirus diarrhoea, antimicrobial resistance etc. She has also worked on vector borne diseases, zoonotic diseases, respiratory infections, parasitic diseases, HIV/AIDS and many more. She has served Indian Council of Medical Research (ICMR) for more than 30 years (1994-2024) as a scientist at ICMR- NIRBI (National Institute for Research in Bacterial Infections), former ICMR-NICED (National Institute of Cholera and Enteric Diseases) and has superannuated from council's service in Nov. 2024 as the Director. Currently she works as the ICMR Emeritus Scientist at the Institute of Child Health (ICH), Kolkata. Research is a passion for Dr. Shanta and she has mentored many post graduate students and research fellows to take up research as their career options.

Topics of her research interest include prevention and control of acute diarrheal and respiratory tract diseases, identification of emerging pathogens causing foodborne outbreaks, controlling the transmission of antimicrobial Resistance (AMR) and environment/ climate associated infections, studying disease pathogenesis, developing alternative herbal medicines agaist typhoid and point of care in-vitro diagnostics for viral diarrhoea, conducting vaccine trials, application of AI & Analytics in developing advanced user friendly devices for providing service. She has promoted collaborative research both at the national and international level.

She has published more than 400 articles and several book chapters with H-index 56. She has four patents on enteric vaccines and typhoid therapeutics.[6]. She has been elected as a Fellow of West Bengal Academy of Science and Technology (FWAST) in 2017; National Academy of Sciences, Allahabad, India (FNASc) in 2019, Fellow of National Academy of Medical Science (FAMS) in 2023, and awarded by ICMR (Indian Council of Medical Research) in 2014, IPHA (Indian Public Health Association) in 2016, IAAM (Indian Association of Applied Microbiologists) in 2017, ISCA (Indian Science Congress Association) in 2018 etc.

== Education ==
Shanta Dutta graduated in Medicine in 1986 from the Calcutta National Medical College under Calcutta University. In 1992, she completed Post Graduation (MD) in Medical Microbiology from Kasturba Medical College, Karnataka under Mangalore University. In 2006, she was awarded Ph.D. in medical science from Kyushu University, Japan.

== Career ==
Before joining ICMR, Dr. Dutta has served West Bengal Health Service (WBHS) as GDMO during 1991 to 1994 at Daspur BPHC, Ghatal, Midnapur. In 1994, she has joined All India Institute of Hygiene and Public Health (AIIH&PH), Kolkata under GOI for a brief period. Soon she changed her place of work and joined ICMR-NICED as a junior researcher in August 1994, and continued there until her retirement as the director of the institute during Jul 2016 to Nov 2024. For promotion of science, she has served as an invited member of various scientific committees: member, Research Advisory Committee (RACs) of organizations like NIPER, Kolkata; NRS Medical College and Hospital, Kolkata; member, institutional Ethical committee (IEC), Jadavpur University; member of National Technical Advisory Group on Immunization (NTAGI) in cholera and typhoid subcommittees; member of Task force committee on TCV (Typhoid Conjugate Vaccine) implementation; member, Steering Committee of Technology information, forecasting, Assessment Council (TIFAC); member of WHO-Global Task Force on Cholera Control (WHO-GTFCC); member of WHO TRG (Technical Resource Group) for developing TPP (Targeted Product Profiles) of typhoid and cholera Rapid diagnostic Tests (RDT) and WHO technical guide for developing guidelines on Cholera Treatment Centres (CTC) in remote areas. She became a member of WHO SAGE (Strategic Advisory Group of Experts on Immunization) Technical Working Group (TWG) on implementation of TCV durng 2024-2026.

During COVID19 pandemic in 2020, being th director of the institute, she played a pivotal role to lead ICMR-NICED in delivering urgent services concerning the rapid and confirmed diagnosis of suspected cases of COVID 19; in training laboratory professionals on rapid diagnosis of Covid 19 by RT PCR across the North Eastern States, Sikkim and West Bengal; in distributing diagnostic kits to all Government laboratories of West Bengal and neighboring states including Andaman Nicobar islands. She also spearheaded the research activities at NICED by taking part in the nationwide serosurvey, in pre-market validation of the indigenous RTPCR kits for COVID 19 diagnosis, in conducting Phase III Covaxin trial. In recognition to her leadership role during COVID pademic, she was felicitated by ICMR, SBI Eastern Region, Indian Post and Telegraph, Eastern Region, Eastern Commando Hospital. To acknowledge her exemplary contributions in preventing infectious diseases as a Public health researcher, she has been awarded "Sera Bangali 2024" award in November 2024 by ABP Ananda and "DashaBhuja Bangali 2026" award in February 2026 by St. Xavier's College and its Alumni Association, and felicitated by Govt of West Bengal on National Doctor's Day 1 July, 2026.

== Personal life ==
She was born as one of twin sisters; her sister is a child specialist under CGHS. Her spouse was a medical consultant pathologist and served State Govt. Medical College and Hospital as a Professor. She has a son, who is an engineer and worked in the corporate sector. She is socially active and loves to be involved in spreading education among economically weak children and female workers.

On 30 June 2020, Shanta Dutta was tested positive for Corona virus. She suffered from pneumonia at that time and was admitted to ICU of a private hospital. She recovered uncomplicated and was discharged from the hospital after a week. Post Covid she developed diabetes and She was again positive for COVID-19 during January 2022, which continued for a week,
