= Anandita Dutta Tamuly =

- Born: Titabar, Jorhat, Assam
- Other names: Chilli girl, Indian Chilli Queen
- Citizenship: Indian
- Occupation: Homemaker
- Known for: Eating Bhut Jolokia peppers and rubbing them on her eyes.
- Predecessor: Anita Crafford
- Spouse: Pankaj Tamuly
- Awards: Limca Book of Records

Anandita Dutta Tamuly, maiden name Anandita Dutta, is an Assamese woman from Titabor Town in Jorhat district of Assam. She is married to Pankaj Tamuly and is mother of a son. She is known for eating and rubbing Bhut Jolokia peppers on her bare eyes. The chilli, native to Assam, is the world's second-hottest chilli pepper.

== Childhood effect ==
When Anandita was five, she had a sore tongue and her mother applied a chilli paste to cure the infection. Since then she developed a penchant for chillies. While children of her age roamed the village looking for berries, she used to look for Bhut Jolokia pepper which she ate with salt.

== Making records ==
In 2006, Anandita had entered the Limca Book of Records by eating 60 ghost chillies in two minutes and smearing 12 chillies in her eyes in one minute flat. Since then she has practised this in an attempt to enter the Guinness World Records by beating South Africa’s Anita Crafford, who created a record by eating eight jalapenos in a minute in 2002.

== In reality shows ==
Anandita's chilli eating was aired on Zee TV's reality show Shabaash India on August 29, 2006.

== Towards Guinness Records ==
"I felt so terrible I could eat only 51. In 2006, I had eaten 60 of them in two minutes for a local record event. But I am sure I shall make it to the Guinness World Records."

— Anandita to The Associated Press.

On Thursday night, April 9, 2009, Anandita performed her feat at the district library auditorium, Jorhat before hundreds of people for a Channel 4 programme on global food being anchored by celebrity British chef Gordon Ramsay. She ate 51 red-hot chillies in two minutes and smeared seeds of 25 chillies in her eyes without shedding a tear. According to Diganta Saikia, one of the event coordinators, the Guinness authorities had earlier asked them to authenticate this with a supervised recording of the feat. The coordinators accordingly asked Ramsay to be the adjudicator for Guinness and he agreed to pursue Anandita’s claim as the world's 'hottest woman' by submitting video clippings.
