= Shambhu Dutt Sharma =

- Born: 9 September 1918
- Died: 15 April 2016 (aged 97)

Shambhu Dutt (9 September 1918 – 15 April 2016), born Shambu Dutt Sharma was an Indian independence and anti-corruption activist.

== Early life ==
Shambhu Dutt Sharma was born in Punjab Province, British India in Hoshiarpur District near Mukerian on 9 September 1918.

== Independence Activist ==
After studying law he became involved in the Indian independence movement at the age of 24 as a supporter of Mahatma Gandhi's Quit India movement which he joined in 1942 after resigning as a civilian gazetted officer in the British Indian Army. During this time he was imprisoned.

In 1975 he was again imprisoned protesting during the Emergency in India imposed by Prime Minister Indira Gandhi.

== Fighting corruption ==
In 2007, as honorary general secretary of the Satyagraha Brigade, Sharma said "corruption has become rampant. It has to be wiped out. On this issue we will start the Satyagraha". He favored the adoption of the Corrupt Public Servants (Forfeiture of Property) bill prepared by the Law Commission of India in 1999, which proposed to bar criminals from contesting elections.

At the age of 92 on 30 January 2011 he ended a hunger strike he had gone on demanding the end of corruption in India, after being persuaded by several prominent people including Kiran Bedi, Swami Agnivesh and also by Prashant Bhushan and Arvind Kejriwal. The campaign was primarily taken on by Anna Hazare. However, Sharma expressed feeling betrayed due to the way Hazare her team handled the negotiations with the government saying “You (Team Anna) cannot call ministers with whom you are discussing an important legislation cheats and liars. That is not a Gandhian way to engage with the government of the day”.

He was also the founder of Transparency International India. Sharma's team was known as Gandhian Seva Brigade.

== See also ==
- Gandhism
- Jan Lokpal Bill
- 2011 Indian anti-corruption movement
- Lokpal
- Lok Sewak Sangh
- Satyagraha
- The Lokpal and Lokayuktas Act, 2013
