= Sarah Dutt =

Early Punjabi migrant to New Zealand

- Born: New Zealand
- Known for: Artist

Sarah Dutt is a New Zealand artist of Māori and Fijian-Indian heritage. She is a founder and member of The Kshetra Collective, a diverse group of artists in New Zealand of Indian heritage.

== Biography ==
Sarah Dutt was born in New Zealand and is of Māori (Ngāi Tai, Whānau-ā-Apanui, Ngāti Porou) and Fijian-Indian descent. Her mother comes from the East Coast of New Zealand, and her father's ancestry is from Uttar Pradesh. Her great-grandfather moved from India to Fiji in the late 1800s during the Girmit. Her grandmother was from Trinidad and emigrated to Fiji in 1906. Dutt's father moved to New Zealand in the 1960s.

Dutt's art practice was established in the 1990s. She attended Elam School of Fine Arts in Auckland and completed a Masters in Fine Arts with Honours in 2005. Dutt has also worked in education and as a teacher since 2003.

Dutt is a founding member of The Kshetra Collective, a group of New Zealand artists of Indian heritage.

== Artwork ==
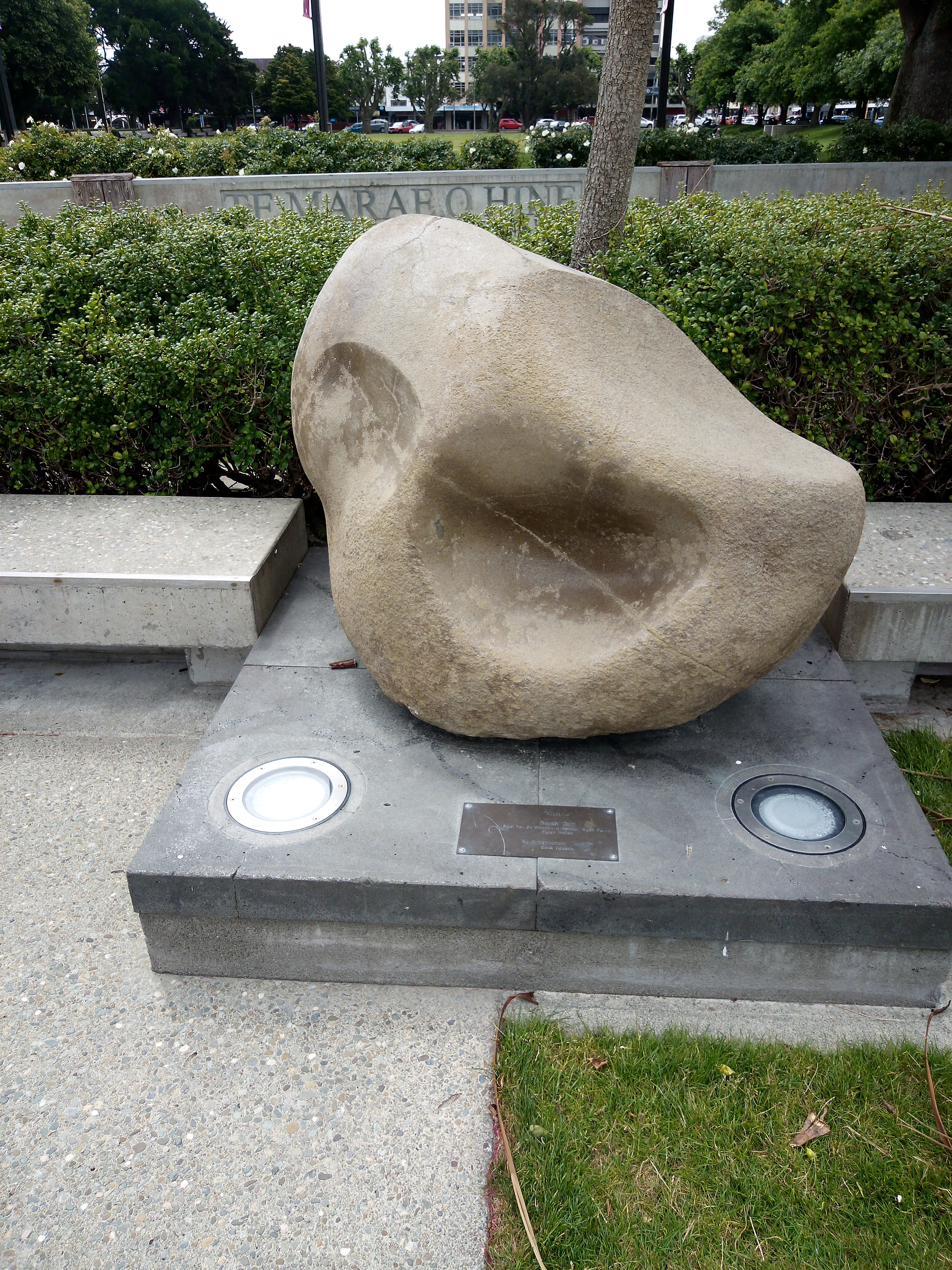
"Alleluia" by Sarah Dutt and Metuanooroa Tapuni. The Square, Palmerston North.

Dutt's mixed media art practice is informed by the visual cultures of her Māori and Indian heritage.

In 2009 Dutt exhibited a series of artworks entitled, Tara, at the Māngere Arts Centre - Ngā Tohu o Uenuku. The series of paintings and installations took visual inspiration from Indian henna and rangoli design as well as Māori ta moko and kowhaiwhai motifs. Dutt plays on the visual and mythological connections between Māori mythology and Hinduism in her work.

In 2022 Dutt, as part of The Kshetra Collective, curated an exhibition at the Auckland War Memorial Museum entitled A Place to Stand. The exhibition aligned with the collective's aims to display the diversity of the Indian diaspora in New Zealand. It was the first exhibition of contemporary Indian New Zealand artists in New Zealand. The exhibition included the painting Where I belong, Toku Tuurangawaewae, Swadesh Hai, Mera, which explores the artist's sense of cultural, physical and spiritual belonging.

In 2023 Dutt had work displayed with The Kshetra Collective in the exhibition, Invisible Narratives: Contemporary Indian Creatives from Aotearoa at the New Zealand Portrait Gallery Te Pūkenga Whakaata. Her painting All in a Day's Work (2023) makes reference to the history of indenture from India to Trinidad and Fiji. The exhibition also includes the painting Where I belong, Toku Tuurangawaewae, Swadesh Hai, Mera.
