= Sadhan Dutt =

Indian scientist and entrepreneur (1921–2008)

- Born: 29 May 1921
- Died: 2 January 2008 (aged 86); Kolkata
- Education: Indian Institute of Technology (BHU) Varanasi
- Occupation: Industrialist
- Spouse: Bharati Dutt

Sadhan Dutt (also spelt Sadhan Dutta) (29 May 1921 – 2 January 2008) was an Indian scientist and entrepreneur.

== Early life and education ==
Born on 29 May 1921, he finished his school education at Guwahati and graduated in mechanical and electrical engineering from Indian Institute of Technology (BHU) Varanasi.

== Career ==
He joined The Kuljian Corporation of Philadelphia as Manager for India in 1950. Later, he launched Kuljian Corporation (India), the first private sector consulting firm in India. In 1979, it emerged as Development Consultants.

He took an important role for the thermal power and nuclear power projects in the country. In addition to it he submitted the project report to the Central Government for the first Metro Railway projects in Kolkata.

== Honours and awards ==
Dutt was honoured in his career. He received the Gold medal from Asiatic Society and the award of ‘Man of the year’ from New York Chamber of Commerce.
