= Rono Dutta =

Indian aviation executive

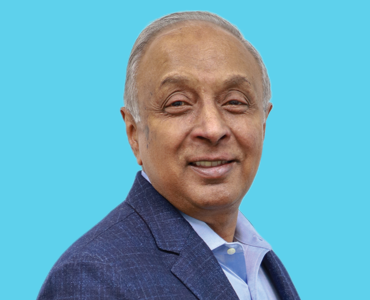

Ronojoy "Rono" Dutta (born 1953) is a retired Indian aviation executive. He was the CEO of InterGlobe Aviation Limited, which operates IndiGo, until he retired in June 2022 and Pieter Elbers took over. He previously served as the President of United Airlines from 1999 to 2002.

== Career ==
Dutta is the co-founder, managing director, member of management committee, and member of investment committee at Achuthan & Co. L.L.C. Earlier, Dutta was a partner at the firm and a strategic advisor of AAR Corp. He has 25 years of experience in the aviation industry.

He served as the senior vice-president, planning and revenue management at United Airlines from 1995 to 1999. He was then promoted president of United and served till 2002.

He became the chairman of the Air Sahara in July 2004. Later, he was the president of Sahara Air Limited in 2006, where he worked till 2008. Under him the sales grew at 35 percent a year.

In 2007, Dutta joined US-based AAR Corporation as a strategic adviser for the Indian market.

On 24 January 2019, he took the role of CEO, InterGlobe Aviation Limited. and retired on 30 September 2022.

== Organizations ==
- Member of board of trustees of Ravinia Festival in Chicago.

== Education ==
Dutta studied in St. Edmund's School, Shillong and obtained his degrees from the IIT Kharagpur and Harvard Business School.
