= Toru Dutt =

Bengali poet and translator (1856–1877)

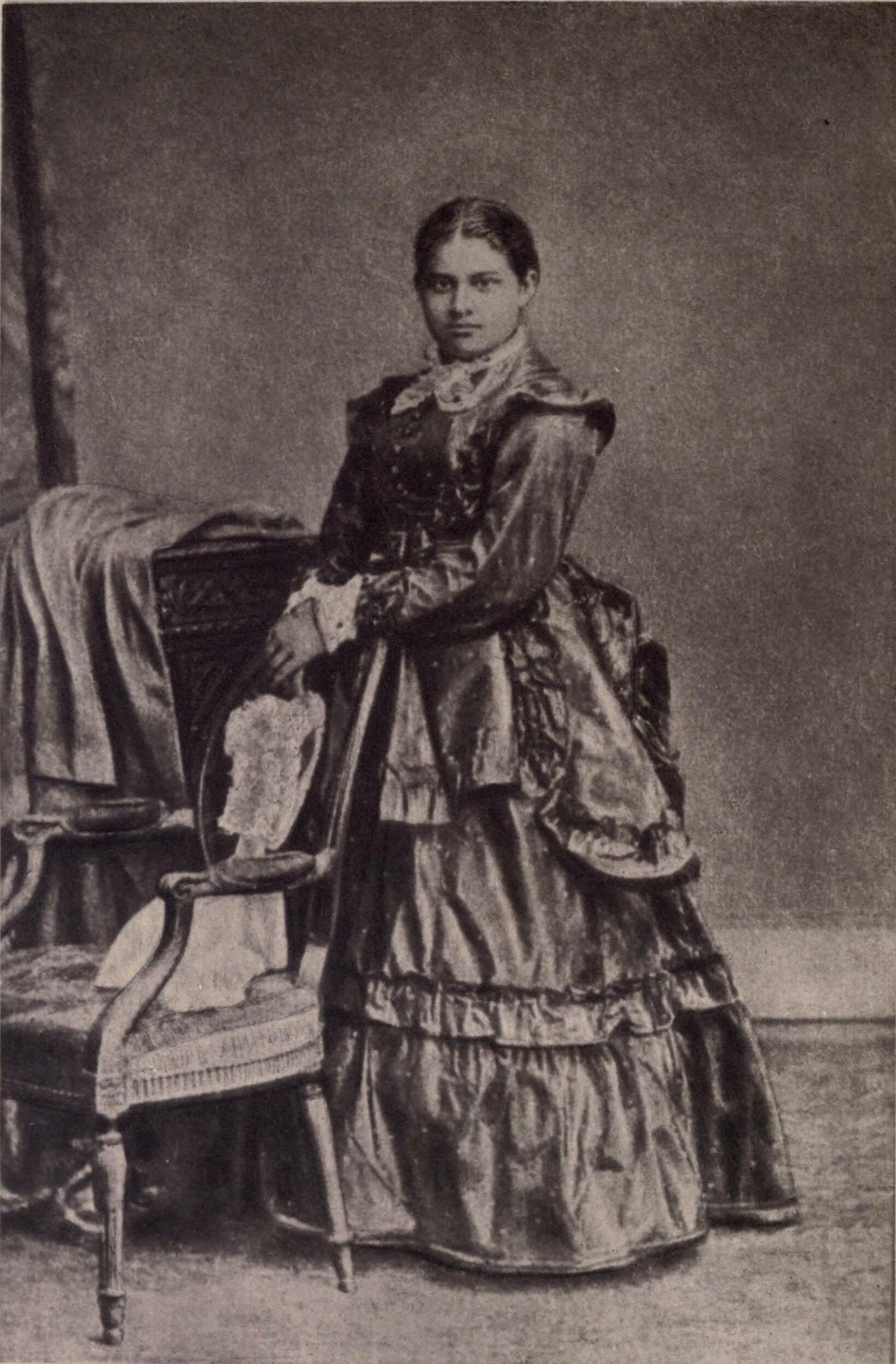
- Portrait of Toru Dutt
- Born: 4 March 1856; 12 Maniktollah Street, Rambagan, Calcutta, Bengal, British India
- Died: 30 August 1877 (aged 21); Calcutta, Bengal, British India
- Resting place: Maniktalla Christian Cemetery, Kolkata
- Occupations: Poet, writer

Tarulatta Datta, popularly known as Toru Dutt (Bengali: তরু দত্ত; 4 March 1856 – 30 August 1877) was an Indian Bengali poet and translator from British India, who wrote in English and French. She is among the founding figures of Indo-Anglian literature, alongside Henry Louis Vivian Derozio, Manmohan Ghose, and Sarojini Naidu. She is known for her volumes of poetry in English, Sita, A Sheaf Gleaned in French Fields (1876) and Ancient Ballads and Legends of Hindustan (1882), and for a novel in French, Le Journal de Mademoiselle d'Arvers (1879). Her poems explore themes of loneliness, longing, patriotism and nostalgia. Dutt died at the age of 21 of tuberculosis.

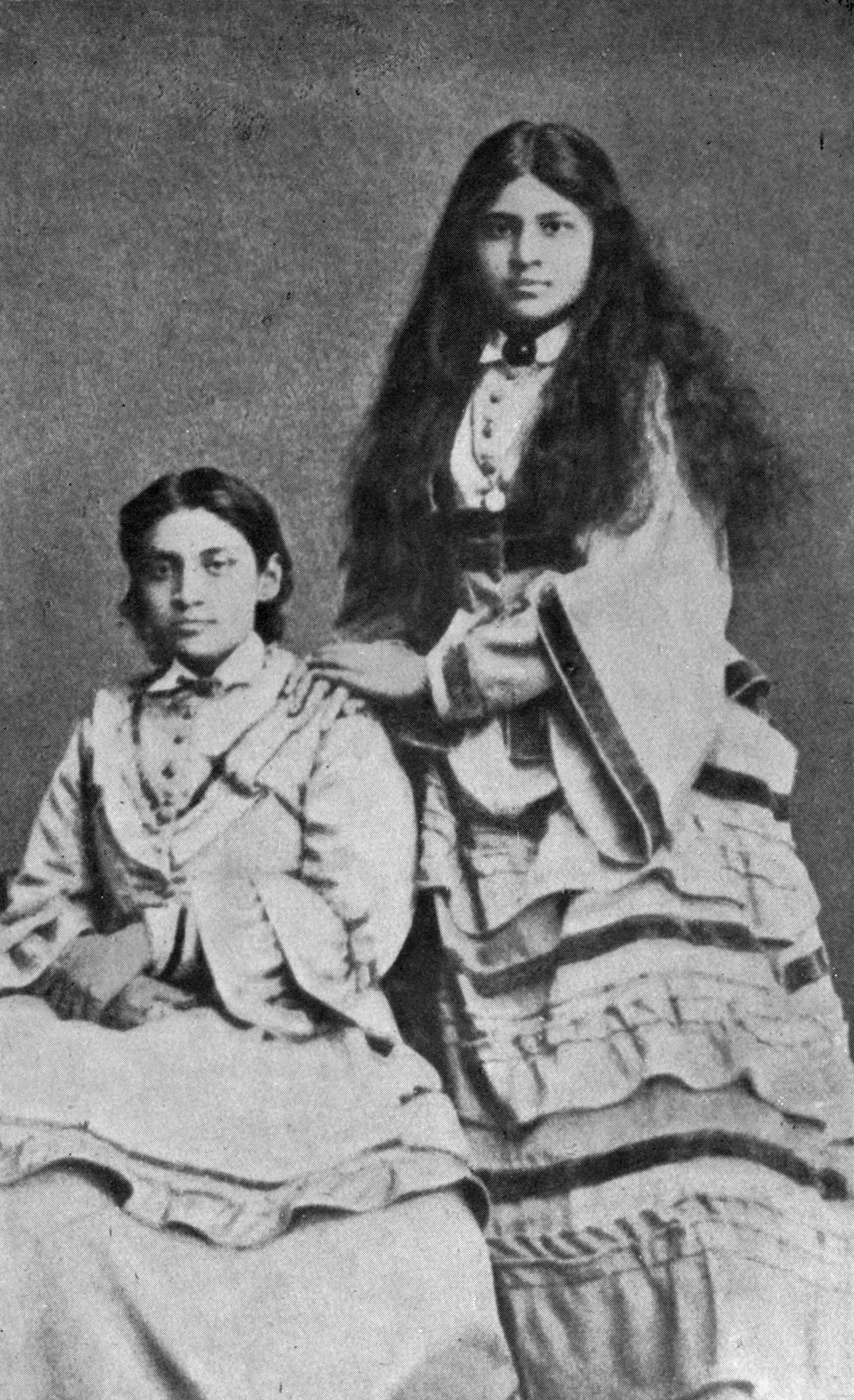
Aru Dutt and Toru Dutt

== Early life and education ==
Toru Dutt was born in Calcutta on 4 March 1856 to a well-respected Bengali kayastha family. Her father, Govind Chandra Dutt was known to be of pro imperialist thoughts and worked as a Magistrate in Calcutta. Her mother, Kshetramoni Dutt (née Mitter), belonged to the Rambagan Dutt family.

Toru was the youngest of three siblings; her sister Aru was two years older to her and she also had a brother Abjie. She and her siblings spent most of their childhood in Calcutta, dividing their time between a house in the city and a garden house in the suburb of Baugmaree. Dutt was educated at home by her father and by an Indian Christian tutor, Babu Shib Chunder Banerjee. She learnt French, English, and eventually Sanskrit, in addition to her first language, Bengali. During this time, she developed a love for English literature, growing to understand and appreciate works such as John Milton's epic, Paradise Lost. She also learned stories of ancient India from her mother.

A few years after her brother Abjie died at the age of fourteen, the family sailed for Europe as Toru's father hoped to give his daughters the best education.

== Life in Europe ==
In 1869, when Dutt was 13, Dutt's family left India, making her and her sister some of the first Bengali girls to travel by sea to Europe. The family spent four years living in Europe, one in France and three in England. They also visited Italy and Germany.

They first lived in Nice, France for a few months where they stayed at a pension, studying French.

In 1870, the family lived in Onslow Square, Brompton, London, where Dutt studied music. In 1871, they moved to Cambridge, where they remained until 1873.

In 1872, the University of Cambridge offered a lecture series, "Higher Lectures for Women", which Toru Dutt attended with her sister Aru. At the time, women were not entitled to join the University of Cambridge and opportunities for higher education were limited. This was a chance for women to access University lectures, set up by a group that included the philosopher Henry Sidgwick and the suffragist Millicent Garrett Fawcett. Toru was especially drawn to the lectures by M. Bognel on French Literature.

"Lectures for Ladies" became Newnham College in 1871, but Toru Dutt did not herself matriculate as a member, presumably because she was living in Cambridge and had no need for college accommodation.

Her correspondence refers, however, to Merton Hall, the early name of Newnham College, and to Miss Clough as Principal of Newnham College. While not a member of a Cambridge college, Dutt would have had access to the college's intellectual discussions and critical thinking.

At the end of 1872, Toru became friends with Mary Martin, daughter of Reverend John Martin of Sidney Sussex College. After Toru's return to India, they kept in touch via letters.

The family left Cambridge in 1873, living in St Leonards, Sussex from April to November 1873 (where the sisters also attended some classes), before their return to Calcutta.

=== A poem for, and about France ===
Even though the Dutt family spent more time living in England than in France, Toru and her sister were captivated by the latter. Toru maintained a journal throughout their stay in Europe, recording all her experiences. This included her observation of France after the Franco-Prussian War. France of 1871, conquered, blood-stained and distracted by internal feuds, made a deep impression on her, awakening her keenest sympathies and inspiring one of her most original poems, 'France'.

Not dead; oh, no, she cannot die !

Only a swoon from loss of blood. Levite England passes her by; Help, Samaritan ! None is nigh

Who shall staunch me this sanguine flood.

Range the brown hair, it blinds her eyen;

Dash cold water over her face ! Drowned in her blood, she makes no sign. Give her a draught of generous wine !

None heed; none hear to do this grace.

No ! she stirs; there 's a fire in her glance.

'Ware, oh 'ware of that broken sword ! What ! dare ye, for an hour's mischance Gather around her, jeering France,

Attila's own exulting horde ?

Lo ! she stands up stands up e'en now,

Strong once more for the battle fray. Gleams bright the star that from her brow Lightens the world. Bow, nations, bow !

Let her again lead on the way.

== Writing ==
=== Published works ===
- A Sheaf Gleaned in French Fields, Saptahik Sambad Press, Bhowanipore, 1876
- Bianca, or the Spanish Maiden, serialized in Bengal Magazine from January to April 1878 (posthumous; unfinished)
- Le Journal de Mademoiselle d’Arvers, Didier, Paris, 1879 (posthumous)
- Ancient Ballads and Legends of Hindustan, 1882 (posthumous)

A Sheaf Gleaned in French Fields was published in 1876 without a preface or introduction. Its 165 poems are translated from French into English by Dutt, except for one poem composed by her, "A Mon Père", and eight poems translated by her sister. At first the collection attracted little attention, though it eventually came to the notice of Edmund Gosse in 1877, who reviewed it favourably in the Examiner that year. Sheaf saw a second Indian edition in 1878 and a third edition by Kegan Paul of London in 1880, but Dutt lived to see neither of these. The second edition added 44 new poems, a portrait of Toru Dutt and her sister, and a preface by their father.

At the time of her death, she left two novels, Le Journal de Mademoiselle d’Arvers, (published posthumously in 1879), the first novel in French by an Indian writer, and Bianca, or the Young Spanish Maiden, (thought to be the first novel in English by an Indian woman writer), in addition to an unfinished volume of original poems in English and Sanskrit translations, Ancient Ballads and Legends of Hindustan. The last were among writings discovered by her father after her death in 1877.

Edmund Gosse wrote an introduction for Ancient Ballads and Legends of Hindustan: "She brought with her from Europe a store of knowledge that would have sufficed to make an English or French girl seem learned, but which in her case was simply miraculous." Some well-remembered poems from the volume include "A Sea of Foliage", "The Lotus", "Sîta", and "Our Casuarina Tree." The last in particular is often taught in high schools in India as a part of the English curriculum.

=== Contributions to Periodicals ===
Dutt also published translations of French poetry and literary articles in Bengal Magazine from March 1874 to March 1877. Notable magazine publications of the time include essays on Leconte de Lisle and Henry Louis Vivian Derozio in December 1874. She also published some translations from Sanskrit in Bengal Magazine (October 1876) and Calcutta Review (January 1877).

- ‘An Eurasian Poet’, The Bengal Magazine III (5 December 1874), p. 164
- ‘A Scene from Contemporary Life’, The Bengal Magazine (June – July 1875)
- ‘Bianca, or The Young Spanish Maiden’, The Bengal Magazine (August 1877 – July 1878)

Dutt had numerous items published in The Bengal Magazine and The Calcutta Review between March 1874 and March 1877.

In addition, Dutt wrote a great many letters.

== Life in India ==
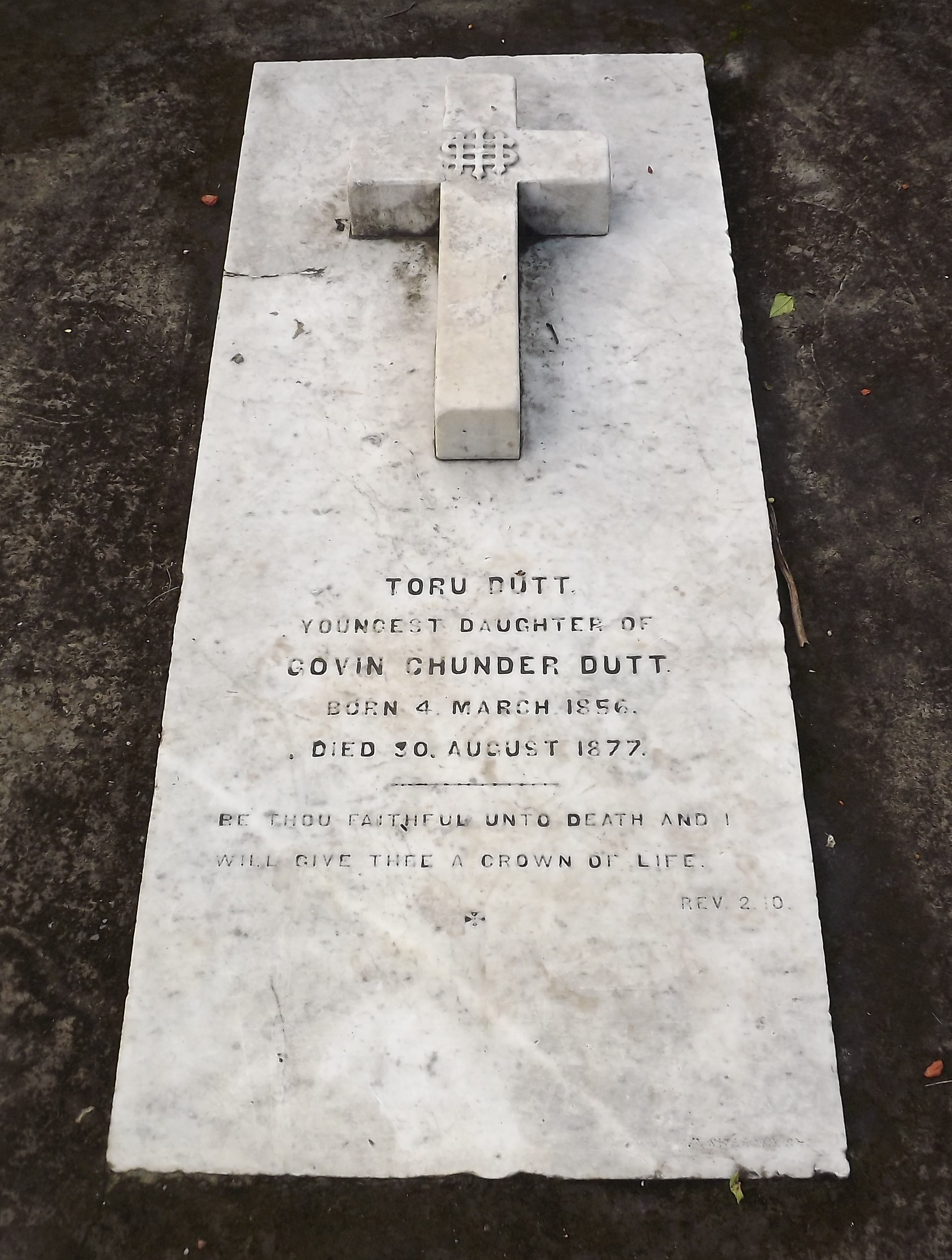
Final resting place of Toru Dutt at Maniktala Christian Cemetery

When Toru Dutt returned to Calcutta in 1873 at the age of 17, she found it challenging to return to a culture that now seemed "an unhealthy place both morally and physically speaking" to her Europeanized and Christianized eyes. Her sister Aru died of consumption in 1872, aged twenty.

Three years after returning, she wrote to Mary Martin, "I have not been to one dinner party or any party at all since we left Europe," and "If any friend of my grandmother happens to see me, the first question is, if I am married."

Both remarks express frustration with what she found to be a restrictive and conservative society. However, she also recognized that Europe could not replace India as her true home. She took consolation in reinvigorating her studies of Sanskrit with her father and hearing her mother's stories and songs about India.

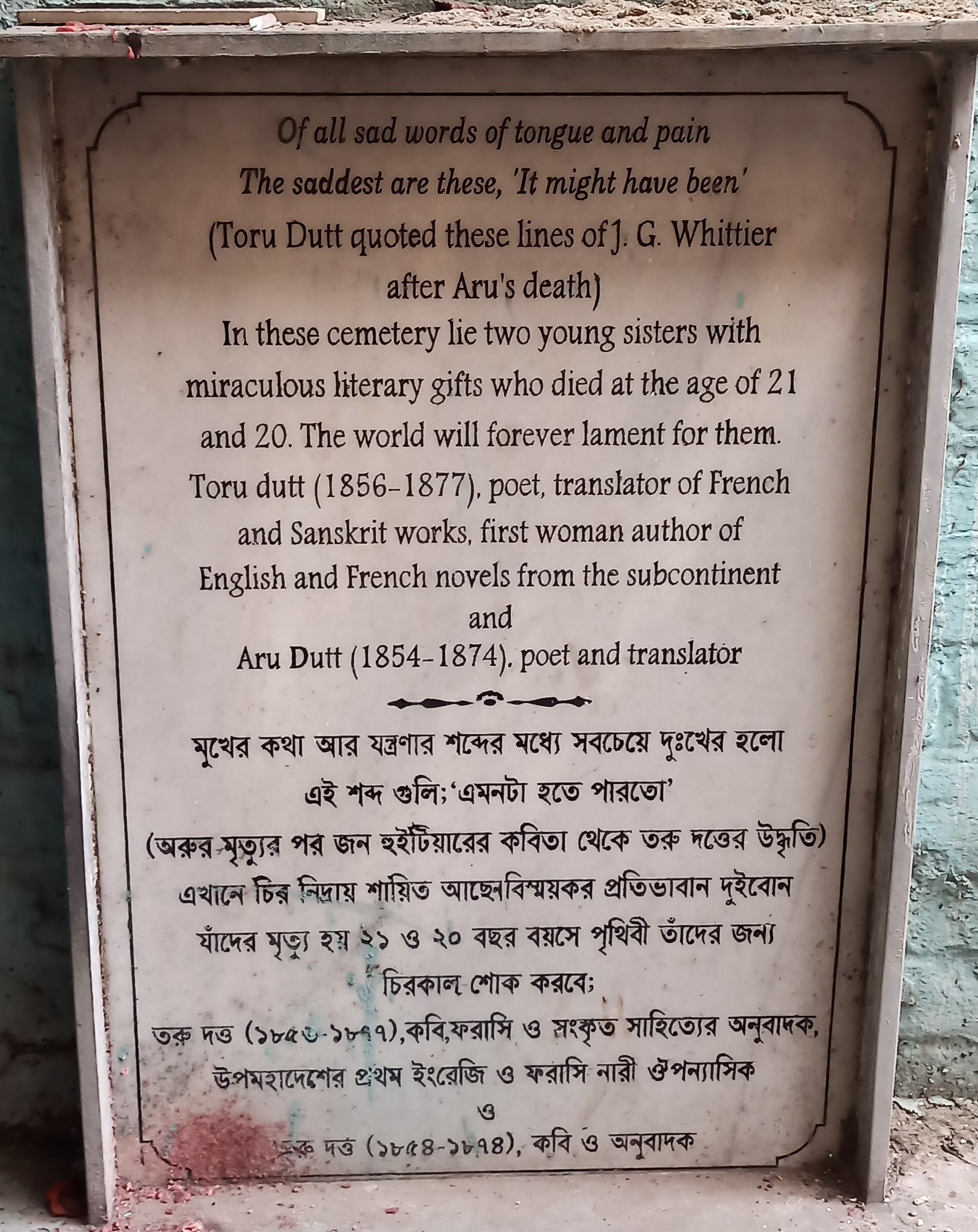
Memorial plaque at Maniktala Cemetery in honour of Aru Dutt and Toru Dutt

Like both her siblings, Toru Dutt died of consumption (tuberculosis), at the age of 21 on 30 August 1877. They were buried in Maniktala Christian Cemetery.

== Documentary ==
A documentary film of 15 minutes' duration Reviving Toru Dutt, consisting mostly of stills of her tomb and of her letters and papers, was produced in 2009 to a screenplay by Dr Geeta Sheth, (who had previously completed a thesis on Toru Dutt), and directed by Deep Panjwani and Ravi Rajput for Foreshadow Pictures.

== Family ==
The Dutt family was one of the first Calcutta families to be strongly influenced by the presence of Christian catholic missionaries. Toru Dutt's grandfather Rasamay Dutt too, held an important position in the colonial government. Her cousin Romesh Chandra Dutt was also a writer and Indian civil servant. Dutt's father converted to Christianity in 1862, when she was six years old. Her mother initially resisted conversion, but eventually became a practising Christian as well. Both of Dutt's parents published some writing: her father wrote poetry and her mother published a translation into Bengali of a religious monograph.
