= Sylhet (disambiguation) =

Sylhet can mean:

- Sylhet metro, an administrative area (a subdistrict) in central Sylhet
- Sylhet city, a city in Bangladesh
- Sylhet district, an administrative area around Sylhet
- Sylhet division, a region and administrative area around Sylhet
- Sylhet region, a region in Bangladesh and India
- Sylheti language, the language spoken in and around Sylhet
- Sylhetis, the people from the Sylhet region
- Sylheti script, a writing system matching the phonology (sound system) of spoken Sylheti

== See also ==
- Sylheti (disambiguation)
- Battle of Sylhet, during the Bangladesh Liberation War (1971)
