= Sylheti =

Sylheti may refer to:

- Sylhetis, an Indo-Aryan ethnocultural group in the Sylhet division and South Assam
- Sylheti language, an Indo-Aryan language
- Sylheti Nagri, an Indic script

== See also ==
- Sylhet (disambiguation)
