= Syloti Nagri (Unicode block) =

- Range: U+A800..U+A82F (48 code points)
- Plane: BMP
- Scripts: Syloti Nagri
- Major alphabets: Sylheti
- Assigned: 45 code points
- Unused: 3 reserved code points

Unicode Version History
- 4.1 (2005): 44 (+44)
- 13.0 (2020): 45 (+1)

Unicode documentation
- Code chart ∣ Web page

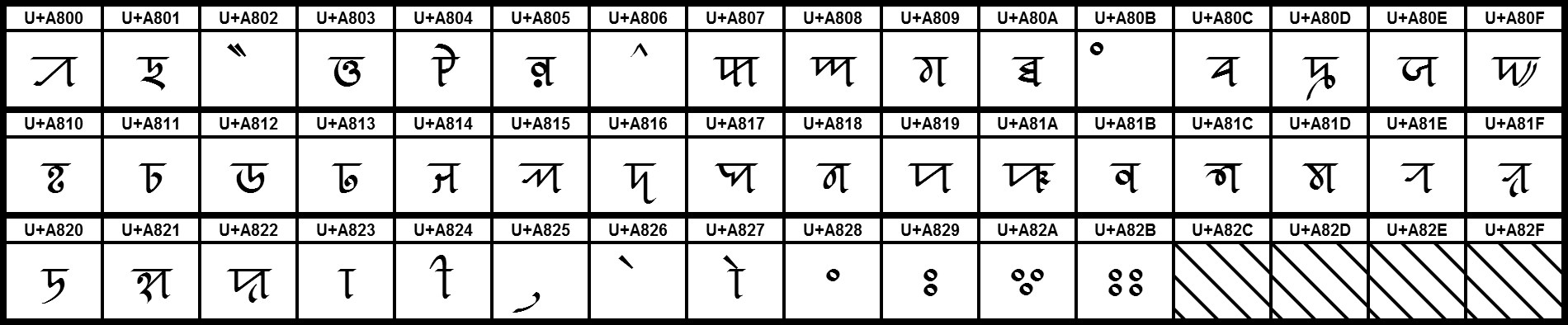
Graphical representation of the Syloti Nagri Unicode block

Syloti Nagri (Sylheti pronunciation: [sílɔʈi nagɾi] or [sílɔʈi nagɔɾi]) is a Unicode block containing characters of the Syloti Nagri script for writing the Sylheti language.

Syloti Nagri^{[1]}^{[2]} Official Unicode Consortium code chart (PDF)
	0	1	2	3	4	5	6	7	8	9	A	B	C	D	E	F
U+A80x	ꠀ	ꠁ	ꠂ	ꠃ	ꠄ	ꠅ	꠆	ꠇ	ꠈ	ꠉ	ꠊ	ꠋ	ꠌ	ꠍ	ꠎ	ꠏ
U+A81x	ꠐ	ꠑ	ꠒ	ꠓ	ꠔ	ꠕ	ꠖ	ꠗ	ꠘ	ꠙ	ꠚ	ꠛ	ꠜ	ꠝ	ꠞ	ꠟ
U+A82x	ꠠ	ꠡ	ꠢ	ꠣ	ꠤ	ꠥ	ꠦ	ꠧ	꠨	꠩	꠪	꠫	꠬			
Notes 1.As of Unicode version 17.0 2.Grey areas indicate non-assigned code points

== History ==
The following Unicode-related documents record the purpose and process of defining specific characters in the Syloti Nagri block:

Version	Final code points (Note: Proposed code points and characters names may differ from final code points and names)	Count	L2 ID	WG2 ID	Document
4.1	U+A800..A82B	44	L2/02-387		Constable, Peter; Lloyd-Williams, James; Lloyd-Williams, Sue; Chowdhury, Shamsul Islam; Ali, Asaddar; Sadique, Mohammed; Chowdhury, Matiar Rahman (2002-11-01), Proposal for Encoding Syloti Nagri Script in the BMP
4.1	U+A800..A82B	44	L2/02-388	N2592	Lloyd-Williams, James; Lloyd-Williams, Sue; Constable, Peter (2002-11-01), Documentation in support of proposal for encoding Syloti Nagri in the BMP - N2591
4.1	U+A800..A82B	44	L2/02-345		Moore, Lisa (2002-11-18), "Syloti Nagri", UTC #93 Minutes
4.1	U+A800..A82B	44	L2/03-146R		Constable, Peter (2003-05-05), Alternate Encoding Models for Syloti Nagri
4.1	U+A800..A82B	44	L2/03-151R		Constable, Peter; Lloyd-Williams, James; Lloyd-Williams, Sue; Chowdhury, Shamsul Islam; Ali, Asaddar; Sadique, Mohammed; Chowdhury, Matiar Rahman (2003-05-10), Revised Proposal for Encoding Syloti Nagri Script in the BMP
4.1	U+A800..A82B	44		N2591	Constable, Peter; Lloyd-Williams, James; Lloyd-Williams, Sue; Chowdhury, Shamsul Islam; Ali, Asaddar; Sadique, Mohammed; Chowdhury, Matiar Rahman (2003-06-12), Proposal to WG2 for Encoding Syloti Nagri Script in the BMP
4.1	U+A800..A82B	44	L2/03-253		Kai, Daniel (2003-08-13), Lepcha, Limbu, Syloti, Saurashtra, Tai Le and Bugis Proposals
4.1	U+A800..A82B	44	L2/03-257		Kai, Daniel (2003-08-13), Introduction to the Syloti Nagri Script
4.1	U+A800..A82B	44	L2/03-136		Moore, Lisa (2003-08-18), UTC #95 Minutes
4.1	U+A800..A82B	44	L2/05-130		Constable, Peter (2005-05-07), Encoding Model for Syloti Nagri Conjoining Behaviour
4.1	U+A800..A82B	44	L2/05-108R		Moore, Lisa (2005-08-26), "Syloti Nagri (C.15)", UTC #103 Minutes
4.1	U+A800..A82B	44	L2/17-418		A, Srinidhi; A, Sridatta (2017-11-29), Encoding model to represent conjuncts in Syloti Nagri
4.1	U+A800..A82B	44	L2/18-039		Anderson, Deborah; Whistler, Ken; Pournader, Roozbeh; Moore, Lisa; Liang, Hai; Cook, Richard (2018-01-19), "18. Syloti Nagri", Recommendations to UTC #154 January 2018 on Script Proposals
4.1	U+A800..A82B	44	L2/18-168		Anderson, Deborah; Whistler, Ken; Pournader, Roozbeh; Moore, Lisa; Liang, Hai; Chapman, Chris; Cook, Richard (2018-04-28), "32. Syloti Nagri", Recommendations to UTC #155 April-May 2018 on Script Proposals
4.1	U+A800..A82B	44	L2/18-241		Anderson, Deborah; et al. (2018-07-20), "28", Recommendations to UTC # 156 July 2018 on Script Proposals
4.1	U+A800..A82B	44	L2/18-259		A, Srinidhi (2018-07-27), Syloti Nagri feedback
4.1	U+A800..A82B	44	L2/18-300		Anderson, Deborah; et al. (2018-09-14), "6. Syloti Nagri", Recommendations to UTC #157 on Script Proposals
4.1	U+A800..A82B	44	L2/19-023		Evans, Lorna; Smith, Steve; Lloyd-Williams, Sue (2019-01-07), Syloti Nagri feedback on L2/18-259
4.1	U+A800..A82B	44	L2/19-047		Anderson, Deborah; et al. (2019-01-13), "12", Recommendations to UTC #158 January 2019 on Script Proposals
4.1	U+A800..A82B	44	L2/19-008		Moore, Lisa (2019-02-08), "D.3.1", UTC #158 Minutes
13.0	U+A82C	1	L2/19-024	N5024	Evans, Lorna (2019-01-12), Proposal to encode SYLOTI NAGRI SIGN ALTERNATE HASANTA in the UCS
13.0	U+A82C	1	L2/19-008		Moore, Lisa (2019-02-08), "D.3.3", UTC #158 Minutes
