= Haltunnabi =

Dobhashi Bengali poetic narrative

Halat-un-Nabi
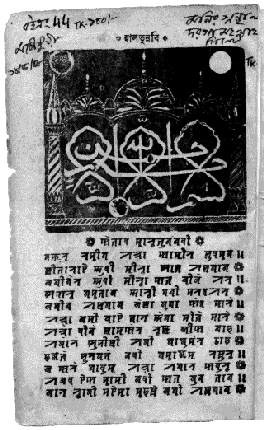
- First page of the puthi in Sylheti Nagri script.
- Author: Munshi Sadeq Ali
- Language: Dobhashi Bengali (written in Sylheti Nagri script)
- Genre: Sīrat (Biography), Poetry
- Published: 1855 (manuscript) c. 1869 (first printed edition)
- Publication place: British India
- Media type: Puthi
- Pages: 275 (first printed edition)

Halat-un-Nabi (Bengali: হালত-উন-নবী; Sylheti: ꠇꠦꠔꠣꠛ ꠢꠣꠟꠔꠥꠘ꠆ꠘꠛꠤ), literally meaning "The Condition of the Prophet," is a seminal Dobhashi Bengali puthi (poetic narrative) written by Munshi Sadeq Ali in the mid-19th century. It is considered his magnum opus and the most famous and widely circulated work composed in the Sylheti Nagri script. The book details the life and times of the Islamic prophet Muhammad, and its publication marked a significant milestone, ushering in the printed era for Sylheti Nagri literature.

== Background and author ==
The author, Munshi Muhammad Sadeq Ali (c. 1800–1862), was born into a Bengali Baidya Hindu family as Gaur Kishore Sen in the village of Daulatpur in the Langla pargana (near present-day Kulaura in Moulvibazar District, Bangladesh). After being orphaned at a young age, he developed an interest in Islam and converted to the faith, formally changing his name to Sadeq Ali and adhering to the Hanafi school of thought. He later served as a munsif (local judge). His literary work was part of a reformist trend that sought to move Bengali Muslim literature away from the syncretic, often Vaishnava-influenced, folk tales of the time and towards more scripture-based Islamic narratives.

== Content and style ==
Halat-un-Nabi is a biography (sīrat) of the Prophet Muhammad, composed in verse. The 275-page puthi covers key events in his life, his teachings, and his virtues. The work is written in the Dobhashi literary dialect, a highly Persianised and Arabicised variant of colloquial Bengali that was customary for Muslim literature of the period. However, its phonology is strongly influenced by the Sylheti vernacular, making it particularly accessible and resonant with the local population of the Sylhet region. The poet Sadiq Ali describes himself as having written this puthi in Bengali language in honor of the Prophet and by the grace of Allah.

Ketab Halatunnabi

ꠎꠔꠝ ꠅꠛꠗꠤ ꠡꠥꠞꠥ ꠀꠈꠦꠞꠤ ꠎꠝꠣꠘꠣ
জনম অবধি শুরু আখেরি জমানা
Jônôm ôbôdhi shuru akheri jamana
From birth until the end of life
ꠎꠣ ꠇꠤꠍꠥ ꠢꠁꠟ ꠔꠣꠞ ꠌꠄꠀꠘ
যা কিছু হইল তার বয়ান
Ja kichhu hôilô tar boyan
Whatever has happened — its narration;
ꠀꠡꠣ ꠞꠣꠈꠤ ꠄ ꠡꠛ ꠛꠣꠋꠉꠣꠟꠣ ꠇꠞꠤ ꠖꠤꠔꠦ
আশা রাখি এ সব বাঙ্গালা করি দিতে
Asha rakhi e shob Bangala kori dite
I hope to present all of this in Bengali,
ꠘꠛꠤꠎꠤꠞ ꠟꠥꠞꠝꠔꠦ ꠀꠞ ꠀꠟꠟꠣꠞ ꠇꠥꠖꠞꠔꠦ
নবিজীর হুরমতে আর আল্লাহর কুদরতে
Nôbijir hurmôte aar Allahr kudrôte
In honor of the Prophet and by the power of Allah.
ꠅꠗꠝ ꠍꠣꠠꠦꠇ ꠇꠢꠦ ꠁꠞꠣꠖꠣ ꠀꠝꠣꠞ
অধম সাদেক কহে ইরাদা আমার
Ôdhôm Sadeq kôhe irada amar
This humble Sadeq expresses this wish of mine;
ꠡꠇꠟ ꠝꠥꠝꠤꠘꠦ ꠙꠟꠤ ꠖꠥꠀ ꠇꠞꠤꠌꠣꠞ
সকল মুমিনে পড়ি দুয়া করিবার
Shôkôl mumine poṛi dua kôribar
May all believers will offer prayers after reading it.

— – Munshi Sadeq Ali

The opening stanza of Ketab Halatunnabi is often quoted, demonstrating the distinct Sylheti Nagri script and the poetic style:

First stanza (in Sylheti Nagri)

ꠉꠚꠥꠞ ꠞꠢꠤꠝ ꠀꠟ꠆ꠟꠣ ꠇꠣꠖꠤꠞ ꠍꠥꠛꠢꠣꠘ
ꠍꠤꠔꠣꠞꠣꠄ ꠈꠥꠛꠤ ꠖꠤꠟꠣ ꠡꠣꠔ ꠀꠍꠝꠣꠘ
ꠏꠝꠤꠘꠦꠞ ꠈꠥꠛꠤ ꠖꠤꠟꠣ ꠇꠔ ꠌꠤꠎꠦ ꠀꠞ
ꠡꠇꠟ ꠝꠢꠔꠣꠎ ꠈꠣꠟꠤ ꠉꠘꠤ ꠙꠞꠅꠀꠞ

— Munshi Sadeq Ali

A rough translation of these opening lines is: "Glorified is the Oft-Forgiving, Most Merciful Allah, The Able, With stars, He beautified the seven heavens, With many things, He beautified the earth, We are all needy except the All-Sufficient Provider."

== Publication and legacy ==
While the manuscript was completed in 1855, the work's monumental legacy began when it became one of the first books to be mass-printed in the Sylheti Nagri script. Around 1869, a munshi named Abdul Karim, who had learned the printing trade in London, returned to Sylhet and founded the Islamia Printing Press in Bandar Bazar. He designed a woodblock type for the Nagri script and published Halat-un-Nabi, bringing it to a much wider audience.

The book's popularity was immense and unprecedented. It became a household staple for Bengali Muslim families across Greater Sylhet and the Barak Valley (Cachar), cementing its place as the most popular and widely printed book in the history of the Sylheti Nagri script. Its fame led to it being transcribed and published in the standard Bengali script as well, ensuring its survival even after the Nagri printing presses, including the original Islamia Press (destroyed in a fire during the Bangladesh Liberation War in 1971), ceased to operate.

In 2014, as part of a major revival of Sylheti Nagri literature, the Dhaka-based publishing house Utsho Prokashon included Halat-un-Nabi in their 25-volume collection, Nagri Grantha Sambhar. The work is frequently recited at cultural events in Sylhet as a cherished part of the region's heritage.

== See also ==
- List of works written in Sylheti Nagri
- History of Sylhet
- Ashraf Hussain, researcher of the script
