= Sadeq Ali =

Bengali writer

Munshi Muhammad Sadeq Ali
- সাদেক আলী
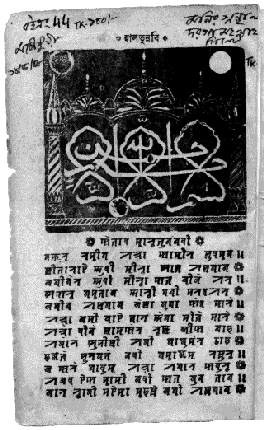
- Halat-un-Nabi by Sadeq Ali
- Born: Shree Gour Kishore Sen; CE 1798 or 1801
- Died: CE 1862 (aged 63–64)
- Occupations: Munshi, judge, poet
- Notable work: Halat-un-Nabi; Mahabbatnama; Hashor Michhil

Munshi Muhammad Sadeq Ali (Bengali: মোহাম্মদ সাদেক আলী, Nagri: ꠍꠣꠖꠇ ꠀꠟꠤ), born as Sri Gaur Kishore Sen (Bengali: শ্রী গৌর কিশোর সেন), was a prominent Sylheti Muslim writer, poet and district judge from 19th century Bengal. He is considered to be the most well-known writer to have used the Sylheti Nagri script and this is due to his magnum opus, Halat-un-Nabi (condition of the Prophet), which gained immense popularity in the Sylhet region and would later be transcribed in the Bengali script.

== Early life ==
Muhammad Sadeq Ali was born in a Bengali Baidya family around 1800 as Shree Gour Kishore Sen.

In August 1818, he was taught the basics of Islam by Maulvi Muhammad Yusuf. Sadeq grew an interest in the Arabic and Persian languages, and so he studied under Mir Munshi Abul Fazl, a detective of the Hingazia thana.

He formally accepted Islam and changed his name to Muhammad Sadeq Ali. He also mentions that he was a follower of the Hanafi madhhab.

== Career as a writer ==
Ketab Halatunnabi

ꠉꠚꠥꠞ ꠞꠢꠤꠝ ꠀꠟ꠆ꠟꠣ ꠇꠣꠖꠤꠞ ꠍꠥꠛꠢꠣꠘ
gôfur rôhim alla qadir subôhan
Glorified is the Oft-Forgiving, Most Merciful Allah, The Able
ꠍꠤꠔꠣꠞꠣꠄ ꠈꠥꠛꠤ ꠖꠤꠟꠣ ꠡꠣꠔ ꠀꠍꠝꠣꠘ
sitarae khubi dila shat asman
With stars, He beautified the seven heavens
ꠏꠝꠤꠘꠦꠞ ꠈꠥꠛꠤ ꠖꠤꠟꠣ ꠇꠔ ꠌꠤꠎꠦ ꠀꠞ
zôminer khubi dila kôtô chize ar
With many things, He beautified the earth
ꠡꠇꠟ ꠝꠢꠔꠣꠎ ꠈꠣꠟꠤ ꠉꠘꠤ ꠙꠞꠅꠀꠞ
shôkôl môhôtaj khali gôni pôroar
We are all needy except the All-Sufficient Provider

— First stanza - Munshi Sadeq Ali

Sadeq Ali decided to take a reformist stance against the common Bengali Muslim literature of Sylhet which had used religious syncretism with Hinduism, in particular Vaishnavism, and Sufi Baul elements. Sadeq Ali then published his Mahabbatnama based on the story of Yusuf and Zulaikha taking inspiration from the earlier version by Shah Gharibullah of West Bengal. He also wrote Hashor Michhil (Procession of Hashr), which also remains in circulation, continuing to be sold in shops in both Sylheti Nagri and Bengali scripts. as well as Radd al-Hind (Response to the Hindus), Kashf al-Bid'ah (Unveiling of Innovation), Pandenama, Dafeh al-Hujat, Hushiarnama and Rahasatul Islam.

Sadeq Ali later composed another puthi about the prophetic biography called Halat-un-Nabi in 1855, focusing more on scripture rather than more popular folk beliefs. It became a household item in every Bengali Muslim homestead in Greater Sylhet and Cachar, making it the most popular and widely printed book in the Sylheti Nagri script. The poet Sadiq Ali describes himself as having written this puthi in Bengali in honor of the Prophet and by the grace of Allah. Sadeq Ali wrote Radd-i-Kufr in 1874.

Ketab Halatunnabi

ꠎꠔꠝ ꠅꠛꠗꠤ ꠡꠥꠞꠥ ꠀꠈꠦꠞꠤ ꠎꠝꠣꠘꠣ
Jônôm ôbôdhi shuru akheri jamana
From birth until the end of life
ꠎꠣ ꠇꠤꠍꠥ ꠢꠁꠟ ꠔꠣꠞ ꠌꠄꠀꠘ
Ja kichhu hôilô tar boyan
Whatever has happened — its narration;
ꠀꠡꠣ ꠞꠣꠈꠤ ꠄ ꠡꠛ ꠛꠣꠋꠉꠣꠟꠣ ꠇꠞꠤ ꠖꠤꠔꠦ
Asha rakhi e shob Bangala kori dite
I hope to present all of this in Bengali,
ꠘꠛꠤꠎꠤꠞ ꠟꠥꠞꠝꠔꠦ ꠀꠞ ꠀꠟꠟꠣꠞ ꠇꠥꠖꠞꠔꠦ
Nôbijir hurmôte aar Allahr kudrôte
In honor of the Prophet and by the power of Allah.
ꠅꠗꠝ ꠍꠣꠠꠦꠇ ꠇꠢꠦ ꠁꠞꠣꠖꠣ ꠀꠝꠣꠞ
Ôdhôm Sadeq kôhe irada amar
This humble Sadeq expresses this wish of mine;
ꠡꠇꠟ ꠝꠥꠝꠤꠘꠦ ꠙꠟꠤ ꠖꠥꠀ ꠇꠞꠤꠌꠣꠞ
Shôkôl mumine poṛi dua kôribar
May all believers will offer prayers after reading it.

— Munshi Sadeq Ali

== Death and legacy ==
Long after Sadeq Ali's death in 1862, the Bangladesh Liberation War took place in 1971. A fire took place in Bandar Bazar, Sylhet town destroying the Islamia Press, which was the largest Sylheti Nagri printing press. However, Bengali script versions of the Halat-un-Nabi puthi continued to be in production and circulation. The puthi was included in the Nagri Grantha Sambhar, a selection of Nagri puthis published by Utsho Prokashon in 2014.

== See also ==
- Haltunnabi
- Heyat Mahmud
- Sylheti Nagri
