= Sylheti language =

Indo-Aryan language spoken in Bangladesh and India

Sylheti
- Silôṭi
- ꠍꠤꠟꠐꠤ
- The word "Silôṭi" in the Sylheti Nagri script
- Pronunciation: [sílɔʈi]
- Native to: Bangladesh and India
- Region: Sylhet Division (Bangladesh); Barak Valley and Hojai (Assam, India); North Tripura and Unakoti (Tripura, India)
- Ethnicity: Sylhetis
- Speakers: L1: 10 million (2003–2017); L2: 1.5 million (no date)
- Language family: Indo-European: Indo-Iranian; Indo-Aryan; Eastern; Bengali–Assamese; Sylheti
- Early forms: Magadhi Prakrit: Māgadhan Apabhraṃśa; Abahaṭ‌ṭha
- Writing system: Sylheti Nagri script; Bengali-Assamese script

Language codes
- ISO 639-3: syl
- Glottolog: sylh1242
- Linguasphere: 59-AAF-ui
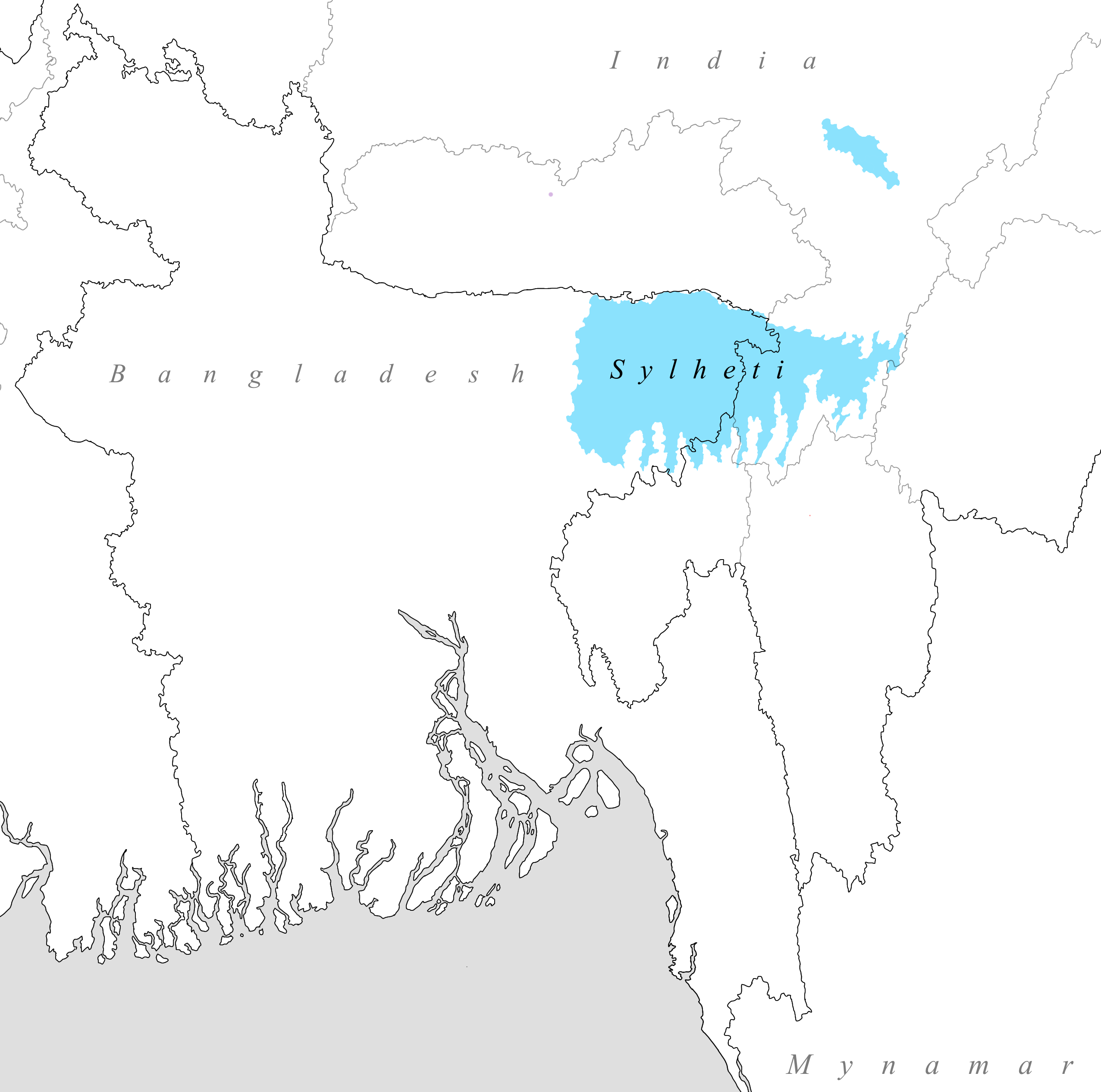
- Map of Sylhetophone areas in South Asia

- Sylheti is classified as Vulnerable by the UNESCO Atlas of the World's Languages in Danger

A description of the king and queen of the termites in Sylheti

Sylheti (Note: English: /sɪˈlɛti/, sil-ET-ee or /sɪlˈhɛti/ sil-HET-ee; Sylheti Nagri: ꠍꠤꠟꠐꠤ Silôṭi pronounced [sílɔʈi]; Bengali: সিলেটি, romanized: Sileṭi, pronounced [ˈʃileˌʈiˑ]) is an Indo-Aryan language spoken by an estimated 11 million people, primarily in Sylhet Division of Bangladesh, Barak Valley of Assam, and northern parts of Tripura in India. In addition, there are substantial numbers of Sylheti speakers in the Indian states of Meghalaya, Manipur, and Nagaland, as well as among diaspora communities across the globe—from Europe and North America to various parts of the Middle East.

It is variously perceived as either a dialect of Bengali or a language in its own right. While many linguists consider it an independent language, for many native speakers, Sylheti forms the diglossic vernacular, with standard Bengali forming the codified lect. Some consider it as a "corrupt" form of Bengali, and there is a reported language shift from Sylheti to Standard Bengali in Bangladesh, India and the diaspora; though Sylheti has more vitality than Standard Bengali among the diaspora in the United Kingdom.

== Name ==
Sylheti is eponymously named after Sylhet, referring to the dialect or language spoken of that area. According to Grierson (1903) the vernacular was called Sylhettia by the Europeans after the town of Sylhet. Though the speakers at that time referred to it as Jaintiapuri, Purba Srihattiya, or Ujania with the latter meaning "the language of the upper country".

Sylheti is also spelt or known as Sylhetti (or Sileti), Sylheti Bangla and Siloti (also spelt in Syloti or Syloty).

== History ==
Sylheti belongs to the Eastern Indo-Aryan languages that evolved from Magadhi Prakrit. The lowlands around Sylhet were originally inhabited by ancient Khasi people (Austroasiatic); and the earliest known Indo-Aryan settlements were founded in the 6th century under the Kingdom of Kamarupa. The Sylheti language was known as the language of the ancient Surma Valley and the Barak Valley in the sixth century CE, so it is assumed that this language is nearly 15 centuries old. Sylhet (Srihatta) then emerged as a center of lowland territorialism after the 10th century. The 11th century Bhatera grants from the Srihatta kings Kesavadeva and Isanadeva were written in Sanskrit. Another notable copper plate inscription was found in the village of Paschimbhag in Rajnagar, Moulvibazar that was issued by King Srichandra during the 10th century.

The Muslim Conquest of Sylhet in 1303 CE extended the migratory movements of Muslims from western lands, who settled among the native population and greatly influenced the local language. Thus Sylheti derived a large number of words from Persian and Arabic, indicating the Perso-Arabic influence on the vernacular. A script was developed in the region called Sylheti Nagri, which primarily focused on disseminating Sufi poetry, known as puthi. Its earliest known work had been written during the 1600s, called Bhedsar by Syed Shah Husayn Alam. The literature was transcribed in the standard form of late Middle Bengali, it was similar to the Dobhashi idiom though phonologically was strongly influenced by Sylheti. The script was read and taught culturally among households and was not institutionalised, as the Islamic dynasties who ruled over Bengal established Persian alongside Arabic as the official languages. Printed texts of the script reached its peak during the late 19th century, however its use became obsolete by around the middle of the 20th century.

In 1903, Grierson reported that Sylheti was spoken only around Sylhet town of the then Sylhet district (now Sylhet Division and Karimganj district in Assam), and that among the Indo-Aryan speakers in the district, about 33 per cent spoke this language.

The earliest appearance of a documentation of Sylheti vocabulary was in the Government Report on the History and Statistics of Sylhet District by T. Walton, B.C.S. in 1857, which contained a list of peculiar words used in Sylhet. Many terms that were listed here differ from modern Sylheti – highlighting its evolution. In 1868, another short glossary of local terms in various districts of the Dacca Division (which included Sylhet) were written up and compared to standard Bengali to allow ease in understanding local vernaculars. Despite being annexed to the Assam Province during colonial rule, Sylheti speakers felt a linguistic affinity with the rest of Bengal. Bengali literature had some influence from Sylheti, popular songwriters or poets such as Hason Raja or Shah Abdul Karim, significantly contributed to the literature. Sylhet was reunited with Bengal following a referendum in 1947.

== Status ==
According to Simard, Dopierala and Thaut, Sylheti is a "minoritised, politically unrecognised, and understudied language." It is currently not officially recognised as a language in either Bangladesh or India. Many native speakers consider it to be a slang or corrupt version of Standard Bengali and not an independent language; and there is a reported language shift to Standard Bengali and a decrease in the number of native speakers since parents are not teaching it to their children. In Bangladesh, there is a diglossia where Sylheti is one among other low status regional dialects while Standard Bengali, the official language, has a high status.

In the Indian state of Assam where Assamese is the state language, Standard Bengali language serves as an additional official language in its Barak Valley districts, which host a majority Sylheti-speaking population.

In the United Kingdom, British schools have begun enlisting Sylheti in their syllabi. BBC News has also broadcast online videos relating to COVID-19 in five major South Asian languages including Sylheti.

== Classification ==
Zia Uddin
Zia Uddin giving a speech in Sylheti

Grierson (1903) notes that the language of eastern Sylhet is not intelligible to Bengalis from the west, though he still classed it as Bengali, grouping it under "Eastern Bengali". Chatterji (1926) too calls it a dialect of Bengali and places it in the eastern Vangiya group of Magadhi Prakrit and notes that all Bengali dialects were independent of each other and did not emanate from the literary Bengali called "sadhu bhasha". Among the different eastern dialect groups, Sylheti and Chittagonian have phonetic and morphological properties that are alien to standard Bengali and other western dialects of Bengali, and these differences are such that Sylheti is more distant to standard Bengali than is Assamese.

Recent scholarship notes that these morpho-phonological and mutual intelligibility differences are significant enough that Sylheti could claim itself as a language on its own right. Ethnologue groups Sylheti in Bengali–Assamese languages; whereas Glottolog gives further subgrouping and places it in the "Eastern Bengali" group alongside Hajong, separately from the Bengali dialects.

=== Language-dialect controversy ===
While modern sociolinguistics generally talks about varieties, rather than languages and dialects, there are still many disagreements about the status of language varieties outside the discipline. These can be for reasons of funding or recognition, or for reasons of identity.

The classification of Sylheti is contentious—Chalmers (1996) suggested that it was generally identified as a dialect of Bengali though there were efforts to recognise it as a language. Grierson had classified Sylheti as an Eastern Bengali dialect and had noted that it "possess all the peculiar characteristics of the extreme Eastern Bengali type." Anecdotal evidence suggests that Sylhetis, who could also speak in Standard Bengali, considered the two languages to be mutually intelligible. On the basis of the anecdotal evidence of mutual intelligibility, regionality and the fact that Sylheti is spoken by a predominantly rural community, Rasinger (2007) concludes that Sylheti could be considered a dialect of Bengali. Simard, Dopierala and Thaut have pointed out that the intelligibility could be an effect of prior exposure of Sylheti speakers to Standard Bengali, and that the academic consensus is that mutual intelligibility ranges from "unintelligible" to "hardly intelligible". On the basis of phonology and phonetics, lexicon, grammatical structure and a lack of mutual intelligibility, some recent linguists claim that Sylheti is not merely a dialectal variation of Bengali but a language in its own right.

Phonologically Sylheti is distinguished from Standard Bengali and other regional Bengali dialects by significant deaspiration and spirantisation, leading to major restructuring of the consonant inventory and the development of tones.

As majority of the diaspora in the United Kingdom speak Sylheti, it created an environment that was somewhat uninfluenced by Standard Bengali, inevitably leading some to view Sylheti as a distinct language. During the 1980s there were unsuccessful attempts to recognise Sylheti as a language in its own right by a small group in the London Borough of Tower Hamlets, which lacked support from the Sylheti community itself.

== Literature ==
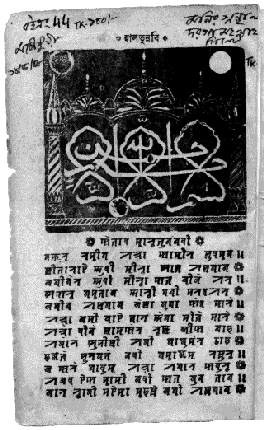
Cover of 19th century Halat-un-Nabi by Sadeq Ali

Halat-un-Nabi, a puthi written by Sadeq Ali is considered to be the most prominent literature in Sylheti Nagri.

The presence and influence of Shah Jalal and Shri Chaitanya dev is found in the Sylheti literature. According to Syed Mostafa Kamal, (approximately 1650 AD) the Baul tradition was founded based on the combination of Chaitanyavad and Jaganmohani ideologies, that mystic literature influenced and seen in the Vaishnava Padavali. As a result, Sylhet is considered as the spiritual capital of mysticism and the fertile land of Baul music. A great number of poets enriched Sylheti literature. Among them, Hason Raja, Radha Raman, Syed Shah Noor, Shitalong Shaha, Durbin Shaha are noteworthy. The main theme of the Nagri literature are mainly religious, Islamic history, tradition, stories, Raga, Baul and mystic music. There have been 140 books found, including 88 printed books in Sylheti Nagri script.

== Writing system ==
Sylheti currently does not have a standardised writing system. Historically in the Sylhet region, the Sylheti Nagri script was used alongside the Bengali script. Sylheti Nagri was however mostly limited to writing religious poetry. The script often avoided tatsama (Sanskrit-derived terms) and incorporated Perso-Arabic vocabulary. Additionally, Sylheti Nagri texts were traditionally paginated from right to left. It is claimed by some that the orthography of the script equates with Sylheti, due to the fewer characters compared with the Bengali script as there are fewer phonemes found in Sylheti. An endangered script, it has since seen a revival mostly by academics and linguists.

Because Standard Bengali is the medium of instruction of state schools in Bangladesh, some may write Sylheti using the Bengali–Assamese script. In United Kingdom, publishers use Latin script for Sylheti and according to the Sylheti Translation and Research (STAR), Latin (Roman) script is the most used script for writing Sylheti. The New Testament in Sylheti was published in the Sylhet Nagri script along with versions in the Latin and in the Bengali–Assamese script, in 2014. STAR is developing a (three script) transliteration system As of 2025, transliterating the language's name, for example as Siloṭi in Latin script.

== Geographical distribution ==
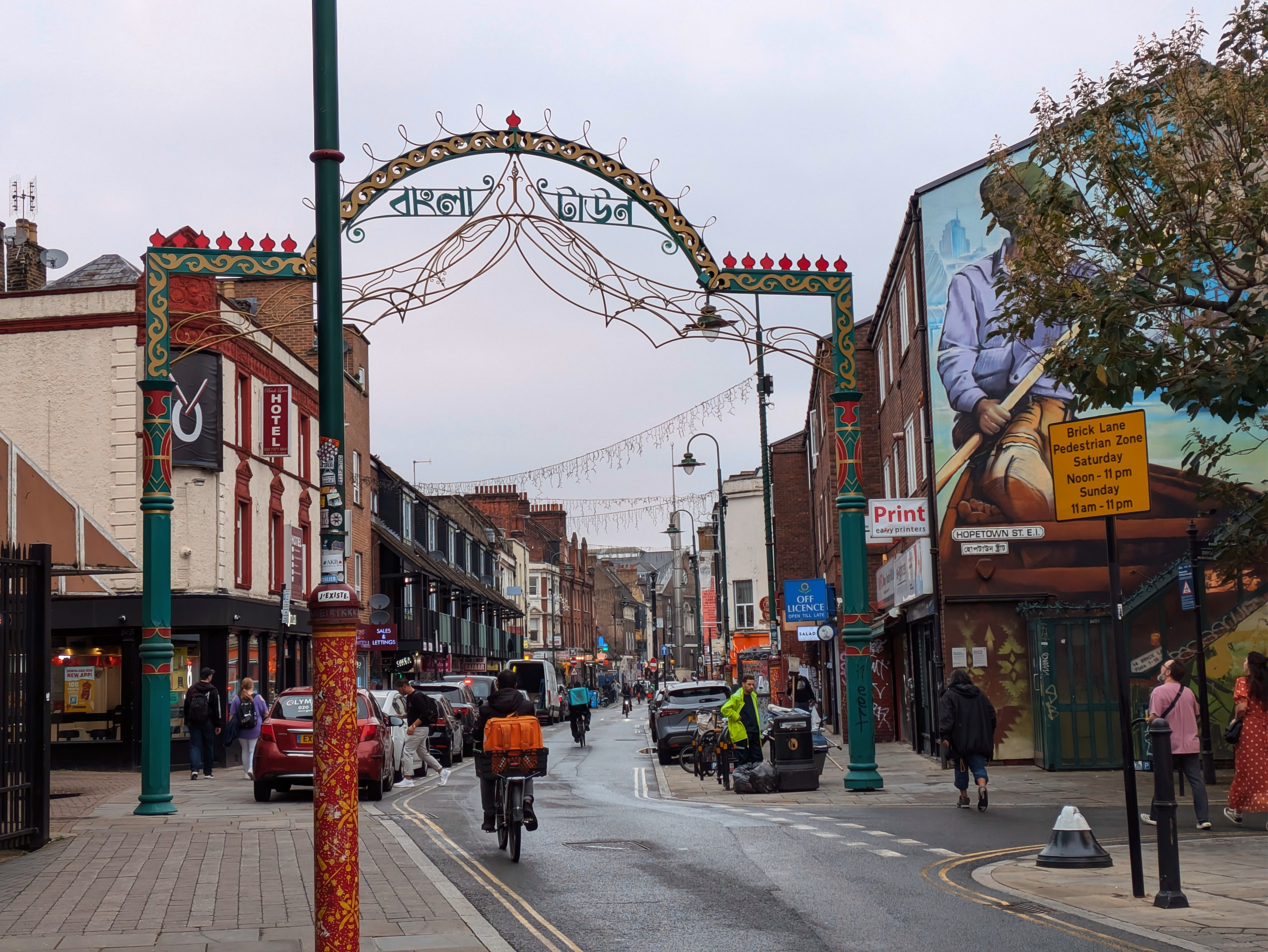
Banglatown in Brick Lane, London, UK, which is home to one of the largest Sylheti diaspora communities in the western world

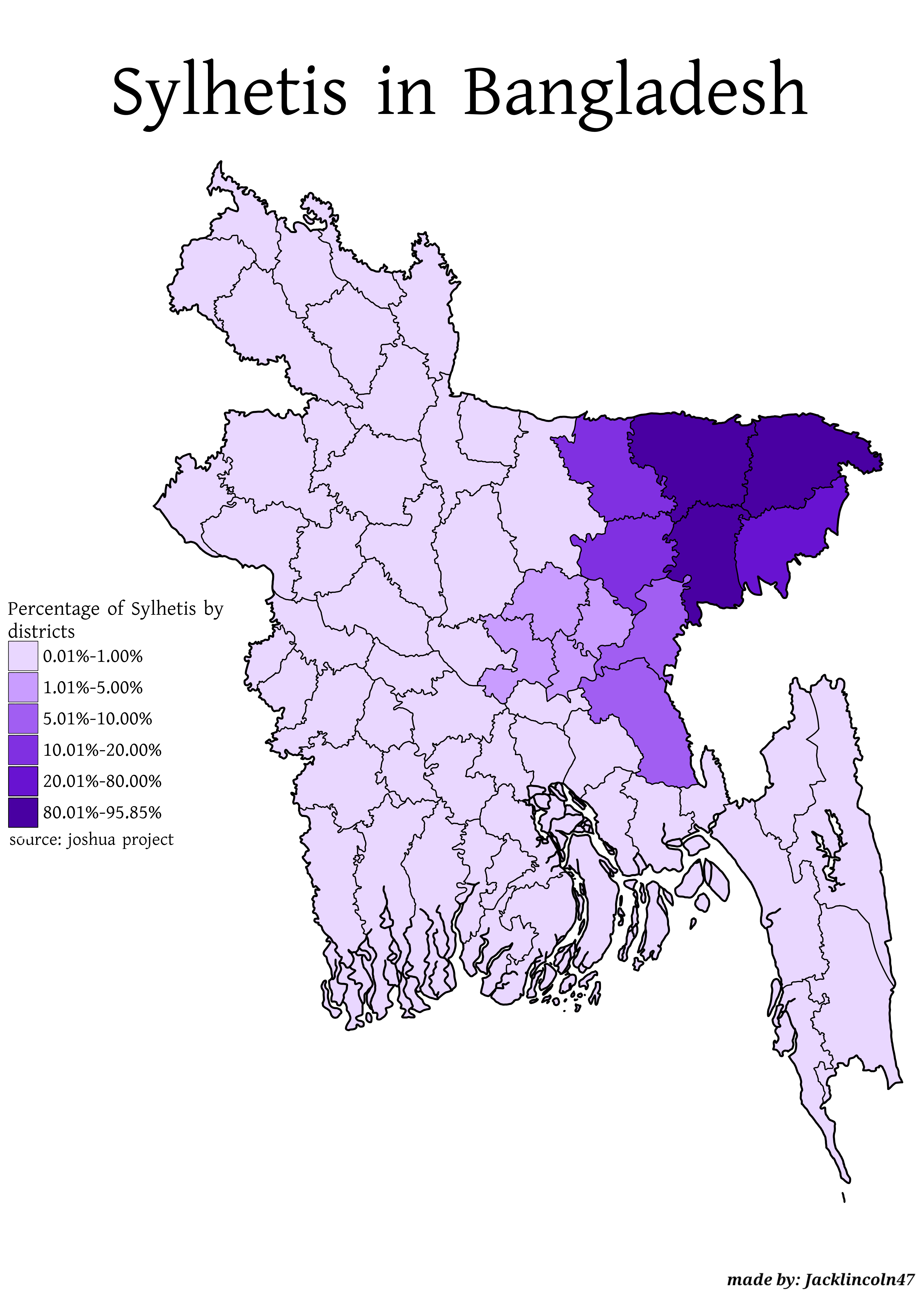
A map showing the distribution of Sylheti speakers in Bangladesh.

Sylheti is the primary language of the Sylhet Division in north-eastern Bangladesh, with its concentration mostly in the districts of Sylhet, Moulvibazar, eastern Sunamganj and north-eastern Habiganj. Recent findings assert that the local dialect spoken in much of the Habiganj district differs quite significantly from Sylheti. According to dialectal studies, the dialects spoken in Habiganj and Sunamganj districts are phonologically and grammatically more similar to Brahmanbaria and East Mymensingh than eastern parts of Sylhet division. Therefore, the dialect of western Sylhet (Habiganj-Sunamganj) is classified with the dialects of Greater Dhaka, Mymensingh, Comilla etc. regions by scholars as it is dialectally allied with these regions.

Sylheti is also widely spoken in the southern Assam region of Barak Valley, India, which includes the districts of Cachar, Hailakandi and Karimganj. In addition, it is spoken in the northern parts of Tripura and Jiribam, Manipur. There is also a significant population of Sylheti speakers in Hojai district of Central Assam, Shillong in Meghalaya, and the state of Nagaland. A few numbers are also located in Kolkata, most of whom are migrants from Assam.

Outside the Indian subcontinent, the largest grouping of Sylheti speakers reside in the United Kingdom, of which 95 per cent of British Bangladeshis have origins from the Sylhet region. It is estimated there are around 400,000 Sylheti speakers in the UK. The largest concentration live in east London boroughs, such as Tower Hamlets. There are also significant numbers of speakers in the United States, most are concentrated in New York City, and in Hamtramck, Michigan where majority of Bangladeshi Americans there are of Sylheti origin. There are also small numbers located in Toronto, Canada. Significant Sylheti-speaking communities reside in the Middle East of which most are migrant workers, and in many other countries throughout the world.

== Lexicon ==
Sylheti shares most linguistic properties with Standard Bengali, with a lexical similarity of 70%.

== Phonology ==
The phoneme inventory of Sylheti differs from both Standard Rarhi Bengali as well as the typical Bangladeshi Standard. It is characterised by a loss of breathiness and aspiration contrasts, leading to a significant reduction in its phoneme inventory and to the development of tones. In particular, the following developments are seen:

- Both voiced and voiceless aspirated stops have become unaspirated (d̪ʱ → d̪; t̪ʰ → t̪).
- The voiceless labials have spirantised to homorganic fricatives (p → ɸ; pʰ → ɸ).
- The velar stops have become velar fricatives (k → x; kʰ → x), although [k] can be heard as an allophone of /x/ when preceded by high vowels /i, u/.
- The post-alveolar affricates have spirantised to alveolar fricatives (tʃ → s; tʃʰ → s; dʒ → z; dʒʱ → z).
- Among the voiceless stops only the dental /t̪, d̪/ and retroflex /ʈ, ɖ/ stops have remained stops. In some analyses, the dental–retroflex distinction (/t̪, ʈ/) is replaced by a dental–alveolar one (/t̪, t̠/).

Vowels
	Front	Central	Back
Close	i ꠁ		u ꠃ
Mid	e~ɛ ꠄ		o~ɔ ꠅ
Open		a ꠀ	

Consonants
		Labial	Dental	Retroflex/ Alveolar	Palato- alveolar	Velar	Glottal
Nasal		m ꠝ	n ꠘ			ŋ ꠋ	
Plosive	voiceless		t̪ ꠔ, ꠕ	ʈ ꠐ, ꠑ			
Plosive	voiced	b ꠛ, ꠜ	d̪ ꠖ, ꠗ	ɖ ꠒ, ꠓ		ɡ ꠉ, ꠊ	
Fricative	voiceless	ɸ~f ꠙ, ꠚ	s ꠌ, ꠍ		ʃ ꠡ	x ꠇ, ꠈ	
Fricative	voiced		z ꠎ, ꠏ				ɦ ꠢ
Flap			ɾ ꠞ				
Approximant			l ꠟ				

=== Tone ===
Sylheti is tonal. This is rare among the Indo-Aryan languages, but not unheard of, e.g. in Punjabi, Dogri, Chittagonian, Gawri (Kalam Kohistani), Torwali, some Eastern Bengali varieties. There are two types of tonal contrasts in Sylheti: the emergence of high tone in the vowels following the loss of aspiration, and a level tone elsewhere.

Word	Transliteration	Tone	Meaning
ꠀꠔ	at	level	'intestine'
'ꠀꠔ	át	high	'hand'
ꠇꠣꠟꠤ	xali	level	'ink'
ꠈꠣꠟꠤ	xáli	high	'empty'
ꠉꠥꠠꠣ	guṛa	level	'powder'
ꠊꠥꠠꠣ	gúṛa	high	'horse'
ꠌꠥꠞꠤ	suri	level	'theft'
ꠍꠥꠞꠤ	súri	high	'knife'
ꠎꠣꠟ	zal	level	'net, web'
ꠏꠣꠟ	zál	high	'spicy/pungent'
ꠐꠤꠇ	ṭik	level	'tick'
ꠑꠤꠇ	ṭík	high	'correct'
ꠒꠣꠟ	ḍal	level	'branch'
ꠓꠣꠟ	ḍál	high	'shield'
ꠔꠣꠟ	tal	level	'palmyra, rhythm'
ꠕꠣꠟ	tál	high	'plate'
ꠖꠣꠘ	dan	level	'donation'
ꠗꠣꠘ	dán	high	'paddy'
ꠙꠥꠟ	ful	level	'bridge'
ꠚꠥꠟ	fúl	high	'flower'
ꠛꠣꠟꠣ	bala	level	'bangle'
ꠜꠣꠟꠣ	bála	high	'good, welfare'
ꠛꠣꠔ	bat	level	'arthritis'
ꠜꠣꠔ	bát	high	'rice'

Sylheti may show patterns of tonal polarity in affixes. For example, when the suffix -ꠐꠣꠁꠘ -ṭain (the inanimate plural marker) is added to a nominal, it will take the opposite tone of the root: bari-ṭáin (from ꠛꠣꠠꠤ bari "home") vs. bárí-ṭain (from ꠜꠣꠞꠤ bárí "heavy"). Also, the third person perfect suffix -se changes the tone of the root: dexsé (from ꠖꠦꠈ- déx "to see") vs. xórse (from ꠇꠞ- xor "to do").

A more recent study shows that there is a three-way tonal system in Sylheti words with two syllables or more. According to this analysis, words with aspiration in the final syllable historically gain a high tone across the word, whilst those with initial aspiration have this replaced by a low tone across the word. Those with no historical aspirated consonants retain a mid tone.

No.	Word	IPA	Tone	Meaning	Word	IPA	Tone	Meaning	Word	IPA	Tone	Meaning
1	ꠙꠣꠑꠣ	ɸáʈá	High	'goat'	ꠚꠣꠐꠣ	ɸàʈà	Low	'torn'	ꠙꠣꠐꠣ	ɸāʈā	Mid	'grindstone'
2	ꠇꠥꠑꠣ	kúʈá	High	'room'	ꠈꠥꠐꠣ	kùʈà	Low	'taunting'	ꠇꠥꠐꠣ	kūʈā	Mid	'stick'
3	ꠙꠣꠈꠣ	ɸáxá	High	'fan'	ꠚꠣꠇꠣ	ɸàxà	Low	'empty'	ꠙꠣꠇꠣ	ɸāxā	Mid	'ripe'

It is considered that these tones arose when aspirated consonants lost their aspiration. Sylheti continues to have a long history of coexisting with tonal Tibeto-Burman languages including various dialects of Kokborok such as Reang. Even though there is no clear evidence of direct borrowing of lexical items from those languages into Sylheti, there is still a possibility that the emergence of Sylheti tones is due to external influence, as the indigenous speakers of Tibeto-Burman languages by and large use Sylheti as a common medium for interaction.

== Grammar ==
Sylheti grammar is the study of the morphology and syntax of Sylheti.

=== Nouns ===
==== Case ====
When a definite article such as -gu/ṭa (singular) or -guin/ṭin (plural) is added, equivalent to using the measure word for the noun as an infix, nouns are also inflected for number. Below is a table of the case inflections for an animate noun, ꠢꠤꠇꠠꠣ hikṛa ('student'), and an inanimate noun, ꠎꠥꠔꠣ zuta ('shoe'), with the definite article employed.

Noun Inflection
	Animate		Inanimate	
	Singular	Plural	Singular	Plural
Nominative	ꠢꠤꠇꠠꠣꠉꠥ/ ꠢꠤꠇꠠꠣꠉꠥꠔꠣ hikṛa-gu/ hikṛa-guta the student	ꠢꠤꠇꠠꠣꠅꠇꠟ hikṛa-oxol the students	ꠎꠥꠔꠣꠉꠥ/ ꠎꠥꠔꠣꠉꠥꠔꠣ zuta-gu/ zuta-guta the shoe	ꠎꠥꠔꠣꠉꠥꠁꠘ/ ꠎꠥꠔꠣꠉꠦꠍꠤꠘ/ ꠎꠥꠔꠣ‌ꠎꠥꠠꠣ zuta-guin/ zuta-gesin/ zuta-zuŗa the shoes
Objective	ꠢꠤꠇꠠꠣꠉꠥꠞꠦ/ ꠢꠤꠇꠠꠣꠉꠥꠔꠣꠞꠦ hikṛa-gu-re/ hikṛa-guta-re (to) the student	ꠢꠤꠇꠠꠣꠅꠇꠟꠞꠦ hikṛa-oxl-ore (to) the students	ꠎꠥꠔꠣꠉꠥ/ ꠎꠥꠔꠣꠉꠥꠔꠣ zuta-gu/ zuta-guta (to) the shoe	ꠎꠥꠔꠣꠉꠥꠁꠘ/ ꠎꠥꠔꠣꠉꠤꠍꠤꠘ zuta-guin/ zuta-gesin (to) the shoes
Genitive	ꠢꠤꠇꠠꠣꠉꠥꠞ/ ꠢꠤꠇꠠꠣꠉꠥꠔꠣꠞ hikṛa-gu-r/ hikṛa-guta-r the student's	ꠢꠤꠇꠠꠣꠅꠇꠟꠞ hikṛa-oxl-or the students'	ꠎꠥꠔꠣꠉꠥꠞ/ ꠎꠥꠔꠣꠉꠥꠔꠣꠞ zuta-gu-r/ zuta-guta-r the shoe's	ꠎꠥꠔꠣꠉꠥꠁꠘꠔꠞ zuta-guint-or the shoes'
Locative	–	–	ꠎꠥꠔꠣꠉꠥꠔ/ ꠎꠥꠔꠣꠉꠥꠔꠣꠔ zuta-gu-t/ zuta-guta-t on/in the shoe	ꠎꠥꠔꠣꠉꠥꠁꠘꠔ zuta-guint-o on/ in the shoes

Note how the case endings attach after the measure word.

For the genitive case, the ending may change depending on the last phoneme of the noun. A noun (without an article) which ends either in a consonant or in the inherent vowel, ꠅ o, is inflected by adding –ꠞ -or to the end of the word (and deleting the inherent vowel if applicable). An example of this would be the genitive of ꠉꠥꠍ gus 'meat' being ꠉꠥꠍꠞ gusor 'of meat' or '(the) meat's'. A noun which ends in any vowel apart from the inherent vowel will just have a -ꠞ -r following it, as in the genitive of ꠙꠥꠀ fua being ꠙꠥꠀꠞ fuar '(the) boy's'. The genitive ending is also applied to verbs (in their verbal noun forms), which is most commonly seen when using postpositions (for example: ꠢꠤꠇꠘꠞ ꠟꠣꠉꠤ hiknor lagi, 'for learning').

For the locative case, only applicable to inanimate nouns, the case marker also changes in a similar fashion to the genitive case, with consonants and the inherent vowel having their own ending, -ꠅ -o, and all other vowels having another ending, -ꠔ -t. For example, ꠍꠤꠟꠐꠅ siloṭo 'in Sylhet', ꠑꠣꠇꠣꠔ ḍáxát 'in Dhaka'.

===== Marked nominative / Ergative =====
The subject of a transitive verb in Sylheti is marked with the case marker - ꠦ -e after consonant endings, and -ꠄ -e after vowel endings and after the generic definite article ending -ꠔꠣ -ta. Thus:

ꠙꠥꠘꠝꠦ ꠜꠣꠔ ꠈꠞ
Punom-e bát xár
Punom-NOM rice eat-PRES.CONT.
Punom is eating rice.

On the other hand, the subject of an intransitive verb, or of the verb ꠎꠣꠃꠣ zaua 'to go', takes no case marker in its nominative case.

ꠝꠤꠘꠣ ꠈꠥꠛ ꠌꠣꠟꠣꠇ
Mina xúb salax
Mina-(NOM) very clever
Mina is very clever.

This feature of Sylheti is closer to Assamese than to Standard Bengali. This marked nominative case has been called an ergative case, and has also led to Sylheti being classified as an ergative–absolutive language. The particular system of split ergativity that Sylheti uses appears to be a retention of the system that emerged from Magadhi Prakrit. However, in Sylheti, this marked nominative is only exhibited by nouns, and not by pronouns.

==== Measure words ====
When counted, nouns must also be accompanied by the appropriate measure word. The noun's measure word (MW) must be used in between the numeral and the noun. Most nouns take the generic measure word gu/ṭa/xán, although there are many more specific measure words, such as zon, which is only used to count humans.

Measure Words
Sylheti

Noy-ṭa góṛi
nine-MW clock
Nine clocks

Xoto-ṭa balish
{How many}-MW pillow
How many pillows

Bout-zon manush
Many-MW person
Many people

Sair-fas-zon foṛauṛa
Four-five-MW teacher
Four or five teachers

Measuring nouns in Sylheti without their corresponding measure words (e.g. aṭ mekur instead of aṭ-gu mekur 'eight cats') would typically be considered ungrammatical. However, omitting the noun and preserving the measure word is grammatical and not uncommon to hear. For example, Xáli êx-zon táxbo. (lit. 'Only one-MW will remain.') would be understood to mean 'Only one person will remain.', since zon can only be used to count humans.

=== Pronouns ===
==== Personal pronouns ====
Sylheti personal pronouns are somewhat similar to English pronouns, having different words for first, second, and third person, and also for singular and plural (unlike for verbs, below). Sylheti pronouns, like their English counterparts, do differentiate for gender. Sylheti has different third-person pronouns for proximity. The first are used for someone who is nearby, and the second are for those who are a little further away. The third are usually for those who are not present. In addition, each of the second- and third-person pronouns have different forms for the familiar and polite forms; the second person also has a "very familiar" form (sometimes called "despective"). It may be noted that the "very familiar" form is used when addressing particularly close friends or family as well as for addressing subordinates, or in abusive language. In the following tables, the abbreviations used are as follows: VF=very familiar, F=familiar, and P=polite (honor); H=here, T=there, E=elsewhere (proximity), and I=inanimate.

The nominative case is used for pronouns that are the subject of the sentence, such as "I already did that" or "Will you please stop making that noise?"

Personal pronouns (nominative case)
Subject	Proximity	Honor	Singular	Plural
1		VF	ꠝꠥꠁ (mui, I)	ꠝꠞꠣ (mora, we)
1		F	ꠀꠝꠤ (ami, I)	ꠀꠝꠞꠣ (amra, we)
2		VF	ꠔꠥꠁ, ꠔꠥꠁꠘ (tui, tuin, you)	ꠔꠥꠞꠣ (tura, you)
2		F	ꠔꠥꠝꠤ (tumi, you)	ꠔꠥꠝꠞꠣ/ꠔꠥꠝꠤ-ꠔꠣꠁꠘ (tumra/tumi-tain, you)
2		P	ꠀꠙꠘꠦ (afne, you)	ꠀꠙꠘꠣꠞꠣ/ꠀꠙꠘꠣꠁꠘ (afnara, you)
3	H	F	ꠄ (e, he), ꠄꠁ (ei, she) / ꠁꠉꠥ (igu, he/she)	ꠄꠞꠣ (era, they)
3	H	P	ꠄꠁꠘ (ein, he/she)	ꠄꠞꠣ/ꠄꠁꠘ-ꠔꠣꠁꠘ (era/ein-tain, they)
3	H	I	ꠁꠉꠥ/ꠁꠇꠐꠣ (igu/ikṭa, it/this)	ꠁꠉꠥꠁꠘ (iguin, these)
3	H	I P	(ita, it/this)	(itain, these)
3	T	F	ꠢꠦ (he, he), ꠔꠣꠁ (tai, she)	ꠔꠣꠞꠣ (tara, they)
3	T	P	ꠔꠣꠁꠘ (tain, he/she)	ꠔꠣꠞꠣ/ꠔꠣꠁꠘ-ꠔꠣꠁꠘ (tara/tain-tain, they)
3	T	I	ꠅꠉꠥ/ꠅꠇꠐꠣ (ogu/oxṭa, it/that)	ꠅꠉꠥꠁꠘ (oguin, those)
3	E	F	ꠢꠦ (he, he), ꠔꠣꠁ (tai, she)	ꠔꠣꠞꠣ (tara, they)
3	E	P	ꠔꠣꠁꠘ (tain, he/she)	ꠔꠣꠞꠣ/ꠔꠣꠁꠘ-ꠔꠣꠁꠘ (tara/tain-tain, they)
3	E	I	ꠢꠉꠥ/ꠢꠇꠐꠣ (hogu/hoxṭa, it/that)	ꠢꠉꠥꠁꠘ (hoguin, those)
3	E	I P	(hita, it/that)	(hitain, those)

The objective case is used for pronouns serving as the direct or indirect objects, such as "I told him to wash the dishes" or "The teacher gave me the homework assignment". The inanimate pronouns remain the same in the objective case.

Personal pronouns (objective case)
Subject	Proximity	Honor	Singular	Plural
1		VF	ꠝꠞꠦ (more, me)	ꠝꠞꠣꠞꠦ (morare, us)
1		F	ꠀꠝꠣꠞꠦ (amare, me)	ꠀꠝꠞꠣꠞꠦ (amrare, us)
2		VF	ꠔꠞꠦ (tore, you)	ꠔꠥꠞꠣꠞꠦ (turare, you)
2		F	ꠔꠥꠝꠣꠞꠦ (tumare, you)	ꠔꠥꠝꠞꠣꠞꠦ/ꠔꠥꠝꠣ-ꠔꠣꠘꠞꠦ (tumrare/tuma-tanre, you)
2		P	ꠀꠙꠘꠣꠞꠦ (afnare, you)	ꠀꠙꠘꠣꠞꠣꠞꠦ/ꠀꠙꠘꠣꠁꠘꠔꠞꠦ (afnarare/afnaintore, you)
3	H	F	ꠄꠞꠦ (ere, him), ꠄꠁꠞꠦ (eire, her)	ꠄꠞꠣꠞꠦ (erare, them)
3	H	P	ꠄꠘꠞꠦ (enre, him/her)	ꠄꠞꠣꠞꠦ/ꠄꠁꠘ-ꠔꠣꠘꠞꠦ (erare/ein-tanre, them)
3	H	I	ꠁꠉꠥꠞꠦ/ꠁꠇꠐꠣꠞꠦ (igure/ikṭare, it)	ꠁꠉꠥꠁꠘꠔꠞꠦ (iguintore, these)
3	T	F	ꠄꠞꠦ (ere, him), ꠄꠁꠞꠦ (eire, her)	ꠄꠞꠣꠞꠦ (erare, them)
3	T	P	ꠄꠘꠞꠦ (enre, him/her)	ꠄꠞꠣꠞꠦ/ꠄꠁꠘ-ꠔꠣꠘꠞꠦ (erare/ein-tanre, them)
3	T	I	ꠅꠉꠥꠞꠦ/ꠅꠇꠐꠣꠞꠦ (ogure/oxṭare, it)	ꠅꠉꠥꠁꠘꠔꠞꠦ (oguintore, those)
3	E	F	ꠢꠦꠞꠦ/ꠔꠣꠞꠦ (here/tare, him), ꠔꠣꠁꠞꠦ (taire, her)	ꠔꠣꠞꠣꠞꠦ (tarare, them)
3	E	P	ꠔꠣꠘꠞꠦ (tanre, him/her)	ꠔꠣꠁꠘ-ꠔꠣꠘꠞꠦ (tain-tanre, them)
3	E	I	ꠢꠉꠥ/ꠢꠇꠐꠣ (hogu/hoxṭa, it)	ꠢꠉꠥꠁꠘ (hoguin, those)

The possessive case is used to show possession, such as "Where is your coat?" or "Let's go to our house". In addition, sentences such as "I have a book" (ꠀꠝꠣꠞ ꠄꠇꠐꠣ ꠛꠁ ꠀꠍꠦ) or "I need money" (ꠀꠝꠣꠞ ꠐꠦꠇꠣ ꠖꠞꠇꠣꠞ) also use the possessive (the literal translation of the Bengali versions of these sentences would be "There is my book" and "There is my need for money" respectively).

Personal pronouns (possessive case)
Subject	Proximity	Honor	Singular	Plural
1		VF	ꠝꠞ (mor, my)	ꠝꠞꠣꠞ (morar, our)
1		F	ꠀꠝꠣꠞ (amar, my)	ꠀꠝꠞꠣꠞ (amrar, our)
2		VF	ꠔꠞ (tor, your)	ꠔꠥꠞꠣꠞ (turar, your)
2		F	ꠔꠥꠝꠣꠞ (tomar, your)	ꠔꠥꠝꠞꠣꠞ/ꠔꠥꠝꠣ-ꠔꠣꠘ/ꠔꠥꠝꠣ-ꠔꠣꠘꠞ (tumar/tuma-tan/tuma-tanor, your)
2		P	ꠀꠙꠘꠣꠞ (afnar, your)	ꠀꠙꠘꠣꠞꠣꠞ/ꠀꠙꠘꠣꠁꠘꠔꠞ (afnarar/afnaintor, your)
3	H	F	ꠄꠞ (er, his), ꠄꠁꠞ (eir, her)	ꠄꠞꠣꠞ (erar, their)
3	H	P	ꠄꠘ/ꠄꠁꠘꠞ (en/einor, his/her)	ꠄꠁꠘ-ꠔꠣꠘꠞ (ein-tanor, their)
3	H	I	ꠁꠉꠥꠞ/ꠁꠇꠐꠣꠞ (igur/ikṭar, its)	ꠁꠉꠥꠁꠘꠔꠞ (iguintor, of these)
3	T	F	ꠄꠞ (er, his), ꠄꠁꠞ (eir, her)	ꠄꠞꠣꠞ (erar, their)
3	T	P	ꠄꠘ/ꠄꠁꠘꠞ (en/einor, his/her)	ꠄꠁꠘ-ꠔꠣꠘꠞ (ein-tanor, their)
3	T	I	ꠅꠉꠥꠞ/ꠅꠇꠐꠣꠞ (ogur/oxṭar, its)	ꠅꠉꠥꠁꠘꠔꠞ (oguintor, of those)
3	E	F	ꠔꠣꠞ (tar, his/her)	ꠔꠣꠞꠣꠞ (tader, their)
3	E	P	ꠔꠣꠘ/ꠔꠣꠘꠞ (tan/tanor, his/her)	ꠔꠣꠁꠘ-ꠔꠣꠘꠞ (tain-tanor, their)
3	E	I	ꠢꠉꠥꠞ/ꠢꠇꠐꠣꠞ (hogur/hoxṭar, its)	ꠢꠉꠥꠁꠘꠔꠞ (hoguintor, of those)

==== Indefinite and negative pronouns ====
Bengali has no negative pronouns (such as no one, nothing, none). These are typically represented by adding the negative particle ꠘꠣꠄ (nae) to indefinite pronouns, which are themselves derived from their corresponding question words. Common indefinite pronouns are listed below.

Question word	Indefinite pronoun	Indefinite negative pronoun
ꠇꠦ/ ꠇꠦꠉꠥ/ ꠇꠤꠉꠥ xe/ xegu/ kigu who	ꠇꠦꠃ xeu someone	ꠇꠦꠃ ꠘꠣꠄ xeu nae no one
ꠇꠣꠞ/ ꠇꠦꠉꠥꠞ/ ꠇꠤꠉꠞꠥ xar/ xegur/ kigur whose	ꠇꠦꠃꠞ/ ꠇꠦꠃꠞꠞ xeur/ xeuror someone's	ꠇꠦꠃꠞ/ ꠇꠦꠃꠞꠞ ꠘꠣꠄ xeur/ xeuror nae no one's
ꠇꠣꠞꠦ kare to whom	ꠇꠦꠃꠞꠦ/ ꠇꠦꠃꠞꠞꠦ xeure/ xeurore to someone	ꠇꠦꠃꠞꠦ/ ꠇꠦꠃꠞꠞ ꠘꠣꠄ xeure/ xeurore nae to someone
ꠇꠥꠘ kun which	ꠇꠥꠘꠥ/ ꠇꠥꠘꠅ kunu/ kuno any	ꠇꠥꠘꠥꠉꠥ ꠘꠣꠄ kunugu nae none
ꠇꠤꠔꠣ kita what	ꠇꠤꠍꠥ/ ꠇꠥꠘꠔꠣ kisu/ kunta some/ something	ꠇꠤꠌ꠆ꠍꠥ/ ꠇꠥꠘꠔꠣ ꠘꠣꠄ kichchu/ kunta nae nothing

==== Relative pronouns ====
The relative pronoun ꠎꠦ (ze) and its different variants, as shown below, are commonly employed in complex sentences. The relative pronouns for animate objects change for number and honour, but those for inanimate objects stay the same.

Animate relative pronouns
	Nominative (who)	Genitive (whose)	Objective (to whom)
Singular (VF/F)	ꠎꠦ ze	ꠎꠣꠞ zar	ꠎꠣꠞꠦ zare
Singular (P)	ꠎꠦꠁꠘ zein	ꠎꠦꠘ zen	ꠎꠦꠘꠞꠦ zenore
Plural (VF/F)	ꠎꠣꠞꠣ zara	ꠎꠣꠞꠣꠞ zarar	ꠎꠣꠞꠣꠞꠦ zarare
Plural (P)	ꠎꠦꠁꠘ-ꠔꠣꠁꠘ zein-tain	ꠎꠦꠁꠘ-ꠔꠣꠘ zein-tan	ꠎꠦꠁꠘ-ꠔꠣꠘꠞꠦ zein-tanore

Inanimate relative pronouns
Nominative/Objective (which)	Genitive (of which)	Locative (in which)
ꠎꠦꠔꠣ zeta	ꠎꠦꠔꠣꠞ zetar	ꠎꠦꠔꠣꠔ zetat

=== Adjectives ===
Adjectives do not inflect for case, gender, or number in Sylheti and are placed before the noun they modify.

Some adjectives form their opposites by prefixing ꠛꠦ- be-, or sometimes ꠘꠤ- ni-; for example, the opposite of ꠞꠥꠎꠉꠣꠞ (ruzgar, 'earning') is ꠛꠦꠞꠥꠎꠉꠣꠞ (beruzgar, 'not earning, idle, mendicant'), the opposite of ꠇꠣꠝꠣ (xama, 'of use') is ꠘꠤꠇꠣꠝꠣ (nixama, 'useless, of no use').

Demonstrative adjectives – 'this' and 'that' – correspond to ꠁ, ꠅ/ꠅꠃ i, o/ou and ꠢꠤ, ꠢ/ꠢꠃ hi, ho/hou, with the definite article attached to the following noun. Thus, 'this book' would translate to ꠁ/ꠅꠃ ꠛꠁꠈꠣꠘ i boi-xan, while 'those books' would translate to ꠢꠃ ꠛꠁ-ꠉꠤꠍꠤꠘ/ꠛꠁ-ꠉꠥꠘ/ꠛꠁ-ꠀꠁꠘ hi boi-gisin/boi-gun/boi-ain.

==== Comparatives and superlatives ====
Sylheti adjectives form their comparative forms with ꠀꠞꠅ (aro, 'more'), and their superlative forms with ꠡꠛ ꠕꠣꠇꠤ (shob táki, 'than all'). Comparisons are formed by using genitive form of the object of comparison, followed by the postposition ꠕꠣꠇꠤ/ꠕꠘꠤ (táki/tóni, 'than') or the postposition ꠟꠣꠇꠣꠘ (laxan, 'like') and then by ꠀꠞꠅ (aro, 'more') or ꠇꠝ (xom, 'less'). The word for 'more' is optional, but the word for 'less' is required, so in its absence 'more' is inferred. Adjectives can be additionally modified by using ꠛꠟꠘ/ꠛꠣꠇ꠆ꠇꠣ/ꠛꠃꠔ (bolon/bakka/bout, 'much') or ꠛꠃꠔ (bout, 'much'), which are especially useful for comparing quantities.

Sylheti	Literal Translation	Meaning
ꠇꠞꠤꠝ ꠞꠢꠤꠝꠞ ꠕꠘꠤ ꠟꠣꠝ꠆ꠙꠣ Xorim Rohimor tóni lampa	Karim of Rahim than tall	Karim is taller than Rahim
ꠇꠞꠤꠝ ꠞꠢꠤꠝꠞ ꠕꠘꠤ ꠀꠞꠅ ꠟꠣꠝ꠆ꠙꠣ Xorim Rohimor tóni aroo lampa	Karim of Rahim than more tall	Karim is taller than Rahim
ꠇꠞꠤꠝ ꠞꠢꠤꠝꠞ ꠕꠘꠦ ꠇꠝ ꠟꠣꠝ꠆ꠙꠣ Xorim Rohimor tóni xom lampa	Karim of Rahim than less tall	Karim is shorter than Rahim
ꠇꠞꠤꠝ ꠞꠢꠤꠝꠞ ꠟꠣꠇꠣꠘ ꠟꠣꠝ꠆ꠙꠣ Xorim Rohimor laxan lampa	Karim of Rahim like tall	Karim is as tall as Rahim
ꠇꠞꠤꠝ ꠞꠢꠤꠝꠞ ꠕꠘꠤ ꠛꠃꠔ ꠟꠣꠝ꠆ꠙꠣ Xorim Rohimor tóni bout lampa	Karim of Rahim than much tall	Karim is much taller than Rahim

=== Verbs ===
Sylheti verbs are highly inflected and are regular with only few exceptions. They consist of a stem and an ending; they are traditionally listed in Sylheti dictionaries in their "verbal noun" form, which is usually formed by adding -a, - ni, -na to the stem: for instance, ꠈꠣꠘꠤ (xani, to eat) is formed from the stem ꠈꠣ and similarly ꠇꠞꠣ/ ꠇꠞꠘꠣ (xora/ xorna, to do) is formed from the stem ꠇꠞ. The stem can end in either a vowel or a consonant. Verbs are conjugated for tense and person by changing the endings, which are largely the same for all verbs. However, the stem vowel can often change as part of the phenomenon known as vowel harmony, whereby one vowel can be influenced by other vowels in the word to sound more harmonious. An example would be the verb to write, with stem lex-: ꠟꠦꠈꠅ (lexo, 'you all write') but also ꠟꠦꠈꠤ (lekí, 'we write'). If verbs are classified by stem vowel and if the stem ends in a consonant or vowel, there are nine basic classes in which most verbs can be placed; all verbs in a class will follow the same pattern. A prototype verb from each of these classes will be used to demonstrate conjugation for that class; bold will be used to indicate mutation of the stem vowel. Additionally, there are irregular verbs, such as ꠎꠣꠘꠤ (zani, to go) that change the first consonant in their stem in certain conjugations.

Like many other Indo-Aryan languages (such as Standard Bengali or Assamese), nouns can be turned into verbs by combining them with select auxiliary verbs. In Sylheti, the most common such auxiliary verb is ꠇꠞꠣ (xora, 'to do'); thus, verbs such as joke are formed by combining the noun form of joke (ꠓꠋ) with to do (ꠇꠞꠣ) to create ꠓꠋ ꠇꠞꠣ. When conjugating such verbs the noun part of such a verb is left untouched, so in the previous example, only ꠇꠞꠣ would be inflected or conjugated (e.g.: I will make a joke becomes ꠀꠝꠤ ꠓꠋ ꠇꠞꠝꠥ; see more on tenses below). Other auxiliary verbs include ꠖꠦꠘꠤ and ꠘꠦꠘꠤ, but the verb ꠇꠞꠘꠣ enjoys significant usage because it can be combined with foreign verbs to form a native version of the verb, even if a direct translation exists. Most often this is done with English verbs: for example, to vote is often referred to as ꠜꠥꠐ ꠖꠦꠘꠤ (búṭ deni, where búṭ is the transliteration of vote).

==== Copula ====
Sylheti is considered a zero copula language in some aspects.

- In the simple present tense there is no verb connecting the subject to the predicative (the "zero verb" copula). There is one notable exception, however, which is when the predicative takes on the existential, locative, or possessive aspects; for such purposes, the incomplete verb ꠀꠍ- (as) is used, which is conjugated according to the rules given below.
- In the past tense, the incomplete verb ꠀꠍ- is always used as the copula, regardless of the nature of the predicative.
- For the future tense and non-finite structures, the copula is supplied by the verb 'ꠅꠅꠀ (ówa), with the only exception being the possessive predicative for which the verb ꠕꠣꠇꠣ (táxa, 'to remain') is utilised.

The following table demonstrates the rules above with some examples.

English	Sylheti	Notes
I am happy	ꠀꠝꠤ ꠈꠥꠡꠤ	No verb used to denote the copula
There is time	ꠛꠦꠁꠟ ꠀꠍꠦ	ꠀꠍ- used to connect to an existential predicative
I am at home	ꠀꠝꠤ ꠛꠣꠠꠤꠔ ꠀꠍꠤ	ꠀꠍ- used to connect to a locative predicative
We were happy	ꠀꠝꠞꠣ ꠛꠦꠎꠣꠞ ꠀꠍꠟꠣꠝ	In the past tense, ꠀꠍ- is used as the copula
I will be at home	ꠀꠝꠤ ꠛꠣꠠꠤꠔ ꠕꠣꠇꠝꠥ	In the future tense, ꠕꠣꠇꠣ is used as the copula
He will have a car	ꠔꠣꠞ ꠄꠈꠣꠘ ꠉꠣꠠꠤ ꠕꠣꠇꠛ	In the future tense, ꠕꠣꠇꠣ is used to connect to a possessive predicative

==== Negation ====
There are three sentence negators employed in Sylheti:

- The zero verb copula is negated using the incomplete negator ꠘ-, which is conjugated as ꠘꠣꠄ (1), ꠘꠣꠁ (2), ꠘꠣ (3).
- Existential sentences that use the verb ꠀꠍ- are negated with ꠘꠣꠁ (nai), which does not need to be conjugated.
- All other verbs (with the exceptions of the ones listed above) are negated using the universal negative particle ꠘꠣꠄ (nae). ꠘꠣꠄ is typically placed after the finite verb (see examples below), but can also be placed at the end of the sentence, which negates the whole sentence. ꠘꠣꠄ can be used in all tenses except two: the present perfect and the past perfect.
- Verbs in the present perfect and the past perfect tenses are negated using the suffix -ꠘꠣ (na) which can also refer to "no" in yes–no questions.

Negating verbs
English	Sylheti	Notes
I am not happy	ꠀꠝꠤ ꠈꠥꠡꠤ ꠘꠣꠄ	Incomplete negator ꠘ- conjugated for first-person
We don't have a car	ꠀꠝꠞꠣꠞ ꠉꠣꠠꠤ ꠘꠣꠁ	ꠘꠣꠁ used to negate ꠀꠍ-, which is completely replaced
I don't work	ꠀꠝꠤ ꠇꠣꠝ ꠇꠞꠤ ꠘꠣ	ꠘꠣ is used to negate all other finite verbs
I didn't help him	ꠀꠝꠤ ꠔꠣꠞꠦ ꠡꠣꠁꠎ꠆ꠏ ꠇꠞꠍꠤꠟꠣꠝ ꠘꠣ	

==== Person ====
Verbs are inflected for person and honour, but not for number. There are five forms: first person, second person (very familiar), second person (familiar), third person (familiar), and second/third person (polite). The same sample subject pronouns will be used for all the example conjugation paradigms: mui (ꠝꠥꠁ), ami (ꠀꠝꠤ), tui (ꠔꠥꠁ), tumi (ꠔꠥꠝꠤ), he (ꠢꠦ), tai (ꠔꠣꠁ) and afne (ꠀꠙꠘꠦ). These have the following plurals respectively: mora (ꠝꠞꠣ), amra (ꠀꠝꠞꠣ), tura (ꠔꠥꠞꠣ), tumra (ꠔꠥꠝꠞꠣ)/tumi-tain (ꠔꠥꠝꠤ-ꠔꠣꠁꠘ), tara (ꠔꠣꠞꠣ)/tain-tain (ꠔꠣꠁꠘ-ꠔꠣꠁꠘ) and afnara (ꠀꠙꠘꠣꠞꠣ).

== Comparison ==
A notable characteristic of spoken Sylheti is the correspondence of the /x/ and /ɦ/, pronounced as a voiceless velar fricative to the /k/ or /kʰ/ of Bengali and voiceless glottal fricative to the /x/ of Assamese respectively.

Standard Bengali	Typical East Bengali	Assamese	Sylheti	IPA	Meaning
ঢাকা Dhaka	ঢাহা, ঢাকা Ḍáha, Dáka	ঢাকা Dhaka	ꠓꠣꠇꠣ Daxa	/ɖáxa/	Dhaka
একজন মানুষ; Êkjôn manush	একজন মানুষ; Êkzôn manush	এজন লোক; Ezôn lük	ꠄꠇꠎꠘ ꠝꠣꠘꠥ(ꠡ); Exzon manu(sh)	/exzɔn manu(ʃ)/	A person
একজন লোক, একজন পুরুষ; Êkjon lok, Êkjôn purush	একজন লুক, একজন বেডা Êkzôn luk, Êkzôn bêḍa	এজন মানুহ; Ezôn manuh	‌ꠄꠇꠎꠘ ꠛꠦꠐꠣ Exzon beṭa	/exzɔn beʈa/	A man
কীসের; Kisher	কীয়ের; Kiyer	কিহৰ; Kihôr	ꠇꠤꠅꠞ; Kior	/kiɔ́ɾ/	Informal of Whereof
কন্যা, ঝি, মেয়ে, পুত্রী Kônna, Jhi, Meye, Putri	কইন্যা, ঝি, মাইয়া, পুরী Kôinna, Zí, Maiya, Puri	জী, ছোৱালী Zi, Süali	ꠏꠤ, ꠙꠥꠠꠤ Zí, Furi/Puṛi, Maiya, Mei, Xoinna,	/zí/, /(ɸ/p)uɾi/, /maija/, /mei/, /xoinna/	Daughter
মানবজাতি Manôbjati	মাইনষের জাত; Mainsher zat	মানৱজাতি, মানুহৰ জাতি Manôwzati, Manuhôr zati	ꠝꠣꠘꠥꠎꠣꠔ; Manuzat	/manuzat̪/	Mankind
অসমীয়া, অহমীয়া Ôshômiya, Ôhômiya	অহমীয়া Ôhômiya	অসমীয়া Ôxômiya	ꠅꠢꠝꠤꠀ; Ohomia	/ɔɦɔmia/	Assamese people
আঙুল; Angul	আঙ্গুল; Angul	আঙুলি Anguli	ꠀꠋꠉꠥꠁꠟ; Anguil	/aŋguil/	Finger, toe
আংটি Angṭi	আংটি, আঙ্গুইট; Angti, Anguiṭ	আঙুঠি Anguṭhi	ꠀꠋꠐꠤ Angṭí	/aŋʈi/	Ring
আগুনপোড়া Agunpora	আগুনপুড়া Agunpura	জুইত পোৰা, জুইত সেকা Zuit püra, Zuit xeka	ꠀꠉꠥꠁꠘꠙꠥꠠꠣ Aguinfura	/aguinɸuɾa/	Baked, grilled
পাখি, চিড়িয়া Pakhi, Chiriya	পাখি, পাহি, পাইখ্যা Pakhi, Pahi, Paikhya	চৰাই, পখী Sorai, Pokhi	ꠌꠥꠀ, ꠙꠣꠇꠤꠀ, ꠙꠞꠤꠘ꠆ꠖꠣ Sua, Faki(a), Forinda	/sua/, /ɸaki(a)/, /ɸɔɾinda/	Bird
পরে, বাদে Pôre, Bade	পরে Pôre	পাছত, পৰত; Pasot, Porot	ꠛꠣꠖꠦ, ꠙꠞꠦ Bade, Fore	/bad̪e/, /ɸoɾe/	Later
সকল, সমস্ত, সব, তামাম; Shôkôl, Shômôsto, Shômôsto, Shôb, Tamam	হগল, হক্কল, সমস্ত, সব, তামাম, ব্যাবাক ব্যাক; Hôgôl, Hôkkôl, Shômôsto, Shôb, Tamam, Bæbāk, Bêk	সকলো, সৱ, চব; Xôkôlü; Xôb; Sôb	ꠢꠇꠟ, ꠡꠛ, ꠔꠣꠝꠣꠝ, ꠡꠇꠟ; Hoxol, Shob, Tamam, Shoxol	/ɦɔxɔl/, /ʃɔb/, /t̪amam/	All
পুরা, গোটা, আস্ত; Pura, Goṭa, Astô	পুরা, গুটা/গোডা, আস্তা Pura, Guta/Goda, Asta	গোটেই; Güṭei	ꠀꠍ꠆ꠔꠣ, ꠙꠥꠞꠣ, ꠉꠥꠐꠣ Asta, Fura, Guṭa	/ast̪a/, /ɸura/, /guʈa/	Whole
সাত বিল; Shat bil	সাত বিল, হাত বিল; Shat bil, Hat bil	সাত বিল; Xat bil	ꠢꠣꠔ ꠛꠤꠟ, ꠡꠣꠔ ꠛꠤꠟ; Hat bil, Shat bit	/ɦat̪ bil/, /ʃat̪ bil/	Seven wetlands
সাতকড়া Shatkôra	সাতকড়া, হাতকড়া Shatkôra, Hatkôra	সাতকৰা Xatkôra	ꠢꠣꠔꠇꠠꠣ Hatxora	/ɦat̪xɔɾa/	Citrus macroptera fruit
সিলেটি Sileṭi	সিলডি, সিলেইট্যা Silôḍi, Sileiṭṭa	ছিলঠীয়া Silôṭhiya	ꠍꠤꠟꠐꠤ Siloṭi	/silɔʈi/	Sylheti
ভালো করে খান। Bhalo kôre khan.	ভালা/ভালো কইরা খান। Bála/Bálo kôira khan.	ভালকৈ খাওক। Bhalkoi khaük.	ꠜꠣꠟꠣ ꠇꠞꠤ/ꠑꠤꠇꠦ ꠈꠣꠃꠇ꠆ꠇꠣ। Bala xori/tike xaukka.	/bála xɔɾi xaukka/, /bála ʈike xaukka/	Bon appetit
স্ত্রী, পত্নী, বউ; Stri, Pôtni, Bôu	বউ; Bôu	স্ত্রী, ঘৈণী, পত্নী Stri, Ghôini, Pôtni	ꠝꠣꠃꠉ, ꠛꠃ; Maug, Bou	/maug/, /bɔu/	Wife
স্বামী, বর; Shami, Bôr	স্বামী, হাই, হাইন, জামাই; Shami, Hai, Hain, Zamai	গিৰিয়েক, পতি, স্বামী Giriyêk, Pôti, Swami	ꠢꠣꠁ, ꠎꠣꠝꠣꠁ; Hai, Zamai	/zamai/	Husband
জামাই; Jamai	জামাই; Zamai	জোঁৱাই; Züai	ꠖꠣꠝꠣꠘ꠆ꠖ; Damand	/damand/	Son-in-law
শ্বশুর; Shôshur	হউর, হশুর; Hôur, Hôshur	শহুৰ; Xôhur	ꠢꠃꠞ; Hour	/ɦɔúɾ/	Father-in-law
শাশুড়ি Shashuṛi	হউরী, হাশুরি, হাউরি Hôuri, Hashuri, Hauri	শাহু Xahu	ꠢꠠꠤ Hoṛi	/ɦɔɾi/	Mother-in-law
শ্যালক; Shyalok	শালা, হালা Shala, Hala	খুলশালা Khulxala	ꠢꠣꠟꠣ Hala	/ɦala/	Brother-in-law
শ্যালিকা Shyalika	শালী, হালী Shali, Hali	খুলশালী Khulxali	ꠢꠣꠟꠤ Hali	/ɦali/	Sister-in-law
শেখা, শিখা Shekha, Shikha	শিখা, শিহা, হিকা, হিহা, হিয়া Shikha, Shiha, Hika, Hiha, Hiya	শিকা Xika	ꠢꠤꠇꠣ Hika	/ɦika/	Learn
সরিষা Shôrisha	হইরা, সইষ্যা, হউরা Hôira, Shôishya, Hôura	সৰিয়হ; Xôriôh	ꠢꠁꠞꠢ, ꠟꠣꠁ; Hoiro, Lai	/ɦɔiɾɔ/, /lai/	Mustard
শেয়াল, শিয়াল; Sheyal, Shiyal	শিয়াল, হিয়াল; Shiyal, Hiyal	শিয়াল; Xiyal	ꠢꠤꠀꠟ; Hial	/ɦial/	Fox, Jackal
বিড়াল, মেকুর; Biṛal, Mekur	বিলাই, মেকুর, মেহুর; Bilai, Mekur, Mehur	মেকুৰী, বিৰালী Mekuri, Birali	ꠝꠦꠇꠥꠞ, ꠛꠤꠟꠣꠁ; Mekur, Bilai	/mekuɾ/, /bilai/	Cat
শুঁটকি Shuṭki	হুটকি, হুনি Huṭki, Huni	শুকটি, শুকান মাছ; Xukôti, Xukan mas	ꠢꠥꠐꠇꠤ, ꠢꠥꠇꠂꠘ; Huṭki, Hukoin	/ɦuʈki/, /ɦukoin/	Sundried Fish
আপনার নাম কী? Apnar nam ki?	আপনের নাম কী(তা)? Apner nam ki(ta)?	আপোনাৰ নাম কি? Apünar nam ki?	ꠀꠙꠘꠞ ꠘꠣꠝ ꠇꠤꠔꠣ? Afnor nam kita?	/aɸnɔɾ nam kit̪a/	What's your name?
ডাক্তার আসার আগেই রোগী মারা/মরে গেল। Daktar ashar agei rogi mara/more gelô	ডাক্তর আহার/আওয়ার আগেই রোগী মইরা গেল। Daktôr ahar/awar agei rügi môira gelô	ডাক্তৰ অহাৰ আগতেই ৰোগী মৰি গ'ল। Daktor ohar agotei rügi mori gól	ꠒꠣꠇ꠆ꠔꠞ ꠀꠘꠤꠞ ꠀꠉꠦꠅ ꠛꠦꠝꠣꠞꠤ ꠝꠞꠤ ꠉꠦꠟ। Daxtor aanir ageu bemari mori gelo.	/ɖaxt̪ɔɾ aanir age bemaɾi mɔɾi gelo/	Before the doctor came, the patient had died.
বহু দিন দেখিনি। Bôhú din dekhini.	বহুত দিন দেহিনাই/দেখছি না। Bôhút din dehinai/dekhsi na.	বহুদিন দেখা নাই। Bôhudin dekha nai.	ꠛꠣꠇ꠆ꠇꠣ ꠖꠤꠘ ꠖꠦꠈꠍꠤ ꠘꠣ। Bakka din dexsi na.	/bakka d̪in d̪exsi na/	Long time, no see.
আপনি ভালো আছেন নাকি? Apni bhalo achhen naki?	আপনে ভালা আছইন/আছেন নি?, আপনে ভালো আছেন নিকি? Apne bála asôin/asen ni?, Apne bálo asen niki?	আপুনি ভালে আছেনে? Apuni bhale asênê?	ꠀꠙꠘꠦ ꠜꠣꠟꠣ ꠀꠍꠁꠘ ꠘꠤ? Afne bala asoin ni?	/aɸne bála asoin ni/	Are you fine/good?
আমি তোমাকে ভালোবাসি। Ami tomake bhalobashi.	আমি তুমারে ভালোবাসি। Ami tumare bálobashi.	মই তোমাক ভাল পাওঁ। Moi tümak bhal paü.	ꠀꠝꠤ ꠔꠥꠝꠣꠞꠦ ꠜꠣꠟꠣ ꠙꠣꠁ।/ꠀꠝꠤ ꠔꠥꠝꠣꠞꠦ ꠜꠣꠟꠣꠛꠣꠡꠤ৷; Ami tumare bala fai. Ami tumare bálabashi.	/ami t̪umare bála ɸai/, /ami t̪umare bálabaʃi/	I love you.
আমি ভুলে গেছি/গিয়েছি। Ami bhule gechhi/giyechhi.	আমি ভুইলা/ভুইল্যা গেছি, আমি পাউরি গেছি। Ami búila/búilla gesi, Ami pauri gesi.	মই পাহৰি গৈছোঁ। Môi pahôri goisü.	ꠀꠝꠤ ꠙꠣꠃꠞꠤꠟꠤꠍꠤ। Ami fauri lisi.	/ami ɸauɾi lisi/	I have forgotten.
আলু গোস্তের/মাংসের ঝোলটা আমার ভালো লাগলো। Alu goster/mangsher jholṭa amar bhalo laglo.	আলু গুস্তের/মাংসের ঝুলটা/ছালনডা আমার ভালা লাগলো। Alu guster/mangsher jhulta/salônḍa amar bála laglo.	‍মাংসৰ তৰকাৰীখন মোৰ খুব ভাল লাগিছে। Mangxôr tôrkarikhôn mür khub bhal lagise.	ꠀꠟꠥ ꠉꠥꠍ꠆ꠞ ꠍꠣꠟꠝꠉꠥꠔꠣ ꠀꠝꠣꠞ ꠛꠣꠇ꠆ꠇꠣ ꠜꠣꠟꠣ ꠟꠣꠉꠍꠦ Alu gusor salomguta amar bakka bala lagse.	/alu gust̪ɔɾ salɔmguʈa amaɾ bakka bála lagse/	I liked the potato meat curry.
শিলচর কোনদিকে? Shilcôr kondike?	শিলচর কোনদিকে/কোন ফাইল/কোন মুহি? Shilcôr kündike/kün phail/kün muhi?	শিলচৰ কোনফালে? Xilsôr künphale?	ꠢꠤꠟꠌꠞ ꠇꠥꠘꠛꠣꠄ/ꠇꠥꠘꠛꠣꠁꠖꠤ/ꠇꠥꠘꠝꠥꠈꠣ? Hilcor kunbae/kunbaidi/kunmuka?	/ɦil͡tʃɔɾ kunbae, kunbaed̪i, kunmuká/	Which way to Silchar?
এইটা কী? Eiṭa ki?	এইটা/এইডা কী(তা)? Eita/Eiḍa ki(ta)?	এইটো কি? Eitü ki?	ꠁꠉꠥ/ꠁꠇꠐꠣ ꠇꠤꠔꠣ? Igu/Ikṭa kita?	/igu, ikʈa kit̪a/	What is this?
সেইটা কী? Sheiṭa ki?	হেইটা/হেইডা কী(তা)? Heita/Heiḍa ki(ta)?	সেইটো কি? Xeitü ki?	ꠢꠤꠉꠥ/ꠢꠤꠇꠐꠣ ꠇꠤꠔꠣ? Higu/Hikṭa/Hiṭa kita?	/ɦigu, ɦikʈa kit̪a/	What is that?
শেষ; Shesh	শ্যাষ, হেষ; Shæsh, Hêsh	শেষ; Xex	ꠢꠦꠡ; Hesh	/ɦeʃ/	End, finish

=== Comparison with Standard Bengali ===
A phrase in:

- Standard Bengali: এক দেশের গালি আরেক দেশের বুলি æk desher gali arek desher buli.
- Sylheti: ꠄꠇ ꠖꠦꠡꠞ ꠉꠣꠁꠟ ꠀꠞꠇ ꠖꠦꠡꠞ ꠝꠣꠔ ex deshor gail arox deshor mát.

which literally means 'one land's obscenity is another land's language', and can be roughly translated to convey that a similar word in one language can mean something very different in another.

Another example:

- মেঘ megh in Standard Bengali means 'cloud'.
- মেঘ mêg(h) in Eastern Bengali means 'rain' or 'cloud'.
- ꠝꠦꠊ/মেঘ megh in Sylheti means 'rain'.
- In Pali, मेघ megha means both 'rain' and 'cloud'.

== See also ==
- Haltunnabi
- Languages of India
- Languages of Bangladesh

== Bibliography ==
- Chatterji, Suniti Kumar (1926). The Origin and Development of the Bengali Language. Calcutta University Press.
- Chung, Chin-Wan (2019). "An alternative account of English consonant cluster adaptations in Bengali dialects". The Linguistic Association of Korea Journal. 27 (3). Calcutta University Press: 99–123. doi:10.24303/lakdoi.2019.27.3.99.
- Hamid, Shahela (June 2005). A Study of Language Maintenance and Shift in the Sylheti Community in Leeds (PDF) (PhD). University of York.
- Gope, Amalesh; Mahanta, Sakuntala (2014). Lexical Tones in Sylheti (PDF). 4th International Symposium on Tonal Aspects of Languages (TAL-2014). Archived from the original (PDF) on 15 August 2021.
- Grierson, G A, ed. (1903). Linguistic Survey of India: Indo-Aryan Family Eastern Group. Vol. V.
- Khan, Sameer Ud Dowla (21 February 2018). "Amago Bhasha: In celebration of our ethnic and linguistic diversity". Dhaka Tribune.
- Lawson, Sarah; Sachdev, Itesh (2004). "Identity, Language Use and Attitudes: Some Sylheti-Bangladeshi Data from London, UK". Journal of Language and Social Psychology. 23 (1): 49–60. doi:10.1177/0261927X03261223. S2CID 144496795.
- Ludden, David (2003). "Investing in Nature around Sylhet: An Excursion into Geographical History". Economic and Political Weekly. 38 (48): 5080–5088. JSTOR 4414346.
- Mahanta, Sakuntala; Gope, Amalesh (2018). "Tonal polarity in Sylheti in the context of noun faithfulness". Language Sciences. 69: 80–97. doi:10.1016/j.langsci.2018.06.010. S2CID 149759441.
- McCarthy, K. M.; Evans, B. G.; Mahon, M. (2013). "Acquiring a second language in an immigrant community: The production of Sylheti and English stops and vowels by London-Bengali speakers". Journal of Phonetics. 41 (5): 344–358. doi:10.1016/j.wocn.2013.03.006.
- Rasinger, Sebastian M. (2007). Bengali-English in East London: A Study in Urban Multilingualism. Peter Lang. ISBN 978-3-03-911036-0.
- Sen, Satarupa (2020). "Mapping of spirantization and deaspiration in Sylheti: An Optimality Theory analysis" (PDF). Language Documentation and Description. 18: 42–55.
- Simard, Candide; Dopierala, Sarah M; Thaut, E Marie (2020). "Introducing the Sylheti language and its speakers, and the SOAS Sylheti project" (PDF). Language Documentation and Description. 18: 1–22.
