= Sylheti Nagri =

Indic abugida script used for the Sylheti language

Sylheti Nagri ꠍꠤꠟꠐꠤ ꠘꠣꠉꠞꠤ
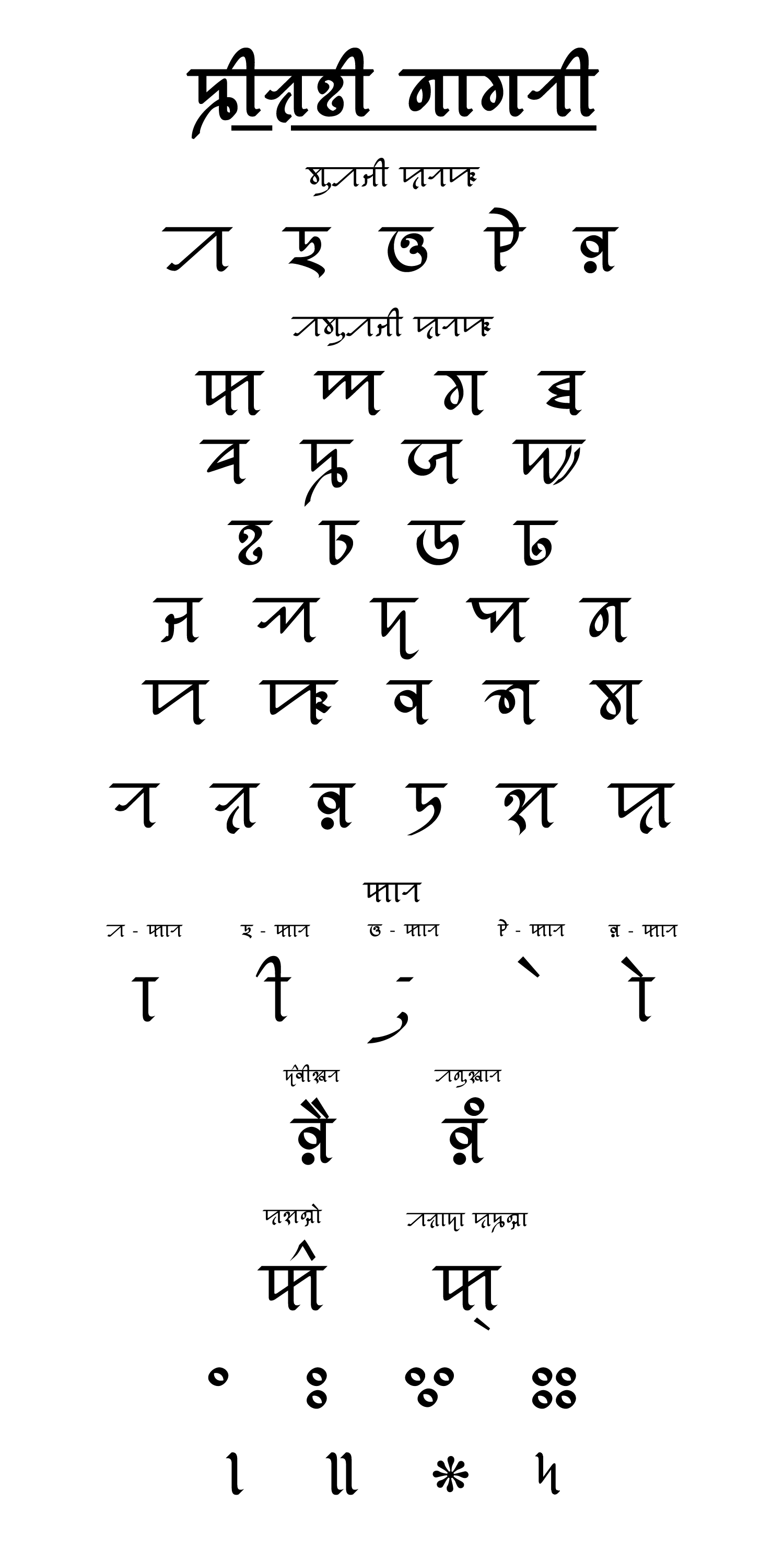
- Sylheti Nagari Varnamala (Abugida Chart) divided into 5 vowels (ꠝꠥꠀꠔꠤ ꠢꠞꠚ), 32 base consonants (ꠀꠝꠥꠀꠔꠤ ꠢꠞꠚ) (Note: ꠅ can represent both the vowel /o/ and the consonant /ʋɔ~wɔ/. The sound is inferred from context.), 5 vowel diacritics (ꠇꠣꠞ), 2 special diacritics (ꠖ꠆ꠛꠤꠡ꠆ꠛꠞ, ꠀꠘꠥꠡ꠆ꠛꠣꠞ), 2 vowel killer marks (ꠢꠡꠘ꠆ꠔꠧ, ꠀꠟꠣꠖꠣ ꠢꠍꠘ꠆ꠔꠣ), 4 poetry marks and 4 punctuation marks.
- Script type: Abugida
- Period: c. 15th century to present
- Direction: Left-to-right
- Languages: Middle Bengali (Note: Historically the script was transcribed in Middle Bengali with Sylheti phonological features); Sylheti

Related scripts
- Parent systems: Proto-Sinaitic: Brāhmī; Gupta; Siddham; Nāgarī; Kaithi script; Sylheti Nagri

ISO 15924
- ISO 15924: Sylo (316), Syloti Nagri

Unicode
- Unicode alias: Syloti Nagri
- Unicode range: U+A800–U+A82F

Sylheti Nagri or Sylheti Nāgarī (Bengali: সিলেটি নাগরী; Sylheti: ꠍꠤꠟꠐꠤ ꠘꠣꠉꠞꠤ; Sylheti pronunciation: [sílɔʈi nagɾi] or [sílɔʈi nagɔɾi]), known in classical manuscripts as Sylhet Nagri as well as by many other names, is an Indic script. The script was historically used in the regions of Bengal and Assam, that were east of the Padma. It was primarily used in the eastern part of the Sylhet region, to document poetry known as puthis. In the course of the twentieth century, it has lost much ground to the standardised Eastern Nagari script. Printing presses for Sylheti Nagri existed as late as into the 1970s, and in the 2000s, the script was added to the Unicode Basic Multilingual Plane (BMP). (See Syloti Nagri (Unicode block) for more details.)

Historically the script was transcribed in Middle Bengali, though having similar characteristics to the more popular Dobhashi literary dialect, it was distinguished for its phonological influence from Sylheti. Sylheti Nagri therefore represented a unique literary culture of the Sylhet region. It was much easier to learn than the most prevalent Bengali script back then. Contemporarily, the script is being revived by some as a key identity marker of Sylhet's cultural heritage.

== Etymology and names ==
Sylhet Nagri is a compound of "Sylhet" (ꠍꠤꠟꠐ) and "nāgrī" (ꠘꠣꠉꠞꠤ). Sylhet is the name of the region in which the script was primarily used and originated from. Nagri means "of or pertaining to an abode (nagar)". Hence, Sylhet Nagri denotes from the abode or city of Sylhet. In recent times it has come to be known as Sylheti Nagri although this name was not used in the classical manuscripts such as Pohela Kitab by Muhammad Abdul Latif. Nagendranath Basu asserts that Nagri is named after the Nagar Brahmins who were known for retaining their Nagri scripts while adopting the local language of places which they migrated to.

The script has been known by other names such as Jalalabadi Nagri (ꠎꠣꠟꠣꠟꠣꠛꠣꠖꠤ ꠘꠣꠉꠞꠤ) after the name of Jalalabad (Sylhet), Phul Nagri (ꠚꠥꠟ ꠘꠣꠉꠞꠤ), Jangli Nagri and Kat Nagri, among others. Another popular term is Musalmani Nagri (ꠝꠥꠍꠟ꠆ꠝꠣꠘꠤ ꠘꠣꠉꠞꠤ) due to its prevalence among Muslims of Sylhet.

== History ==
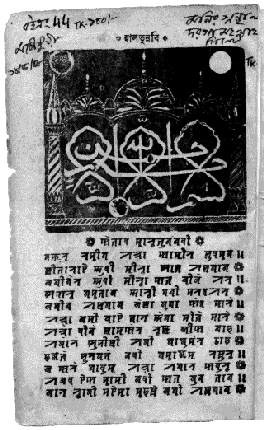
Cover of 19th century Halat-un-Nabi by Sadeq Ali

=== Origins ===
According to Qadir (1999) and Professor Clifford Wright, the script descends from Kaithi script, a script predominantly used in Bihar.

The specific origin of the script is debated. Though most popular in Sylhet, according to renowned linguist Suniti Kumar Chatterjee the usage of Nagri in East Bengal is attributed to early Muslim colonies from upper india, the script was historically also used in Greater Mymensingh, Northeast India and West Bengal. One hypothesis is that the Muslims of Sylhet were the ones to invent it for the purpose of mass Islamic education, which is thought to have taken place during the 15th century, when Bengali Hindus led by Krishna Chaitanya, started a Sanskrit and Vaishnavist reawakening movement. On the other hand, Ahmad Hasan Dani believes that, it was invented by the Afghans during their rule of Bengal, since Nagri letters resemble Afghan coin symbols and the large number of Afghan inhabitants in Sylhet at the time. Another theory dates the script's origin as late as the seventeenth to eighteenth century, claiming that it was invented to facilitate the Muslim sepoys coming from the joint state of Bihar and other immigrant Muslims.

Though almost solely used by Muslims, there are other theories which point the script's origins to Buddhists and Hindus who later converted to Islam. A popular theory is that it was brought to the region via Nagar Brahmins. This is a Hindu caste known for travelling and settling across the subcontinent, adopting the local language but writing in their own Nagari-variant of Kaithi instead. The Brahmins converted to Islam though retained the practice of the Nagri script for poetry. This is also the case in other parts of South Asia such as Sindh, Multan and Varanasi. Baitali Kaithi was a former script used to write Hindustani at a similar time, and it was identical to Sylhet Nagri with the exception that the latter had a matra (upper horizontal line used in Brahmic scripts). Others say that the script was invented by immigrant Bhikkhus (originally Buddhist in faith) from neighbouring countries such as Nepal.

Manuscripts have been found of works such as Rag Namah by Fazil Nasim Muhammad, Shonabhaner Puthi by Abdul Karim and the earliest known work Talib Husan (1549) by Ghulam Husan.

=== Usage ===
The simplistic nature of the script inspired a lot of poets, though the bulk of Sylheti Nagri literature was born in the late 19th century. Abdul Karim, a munshi who was studying and completing his education in London, spent several years in the English capital to learn the printing trade. After returning home in circa 1869, he designed a woodblock type for the script and founded the Islamia Printing Press in Bandar Bazar, Sylhet. Padmanath Bhattacharjee Vidyabinod, who wrote the first scholarly article on the script, is of the opinion that Abdul Karim's standardisation marks the start of the script's reawakening (nobojonmo) period. Prior to Abdul Karim's intervention, not much is known about the popularity and usage of the script. The manuscripts were of prosaic quality, but poetry was also abundant. The Munshi Sadeq Ali is considered to have been the greatest and most popular writer of the script. Apart from renowned literary works such as Halat-un-Nabi, Jongonama, Mahabbatnama or Noor Noshihot, it has been used to write medicine and magical manuscripts, as well as Poems of the Second World War.

Other Sylheti Nagri presses were established in Sylhet, Sunamganj, Shillong and Kolkata. Some include the Sarada Printing and Publishing in Naiyorpul, Sylhet; and Calcutta's General Printing Works in 16 Gardner Lane, Taltala as well as the Hamidi Press in Sealdah. It has been asserted from scholarly writings that the script was used as far as Bankura, Barisal, Chittagong and Noakhali. The script had also spread to Tripura, Mymensingh and Dhaka. The script is thought to have spread to Chittagong and Barisal via river.

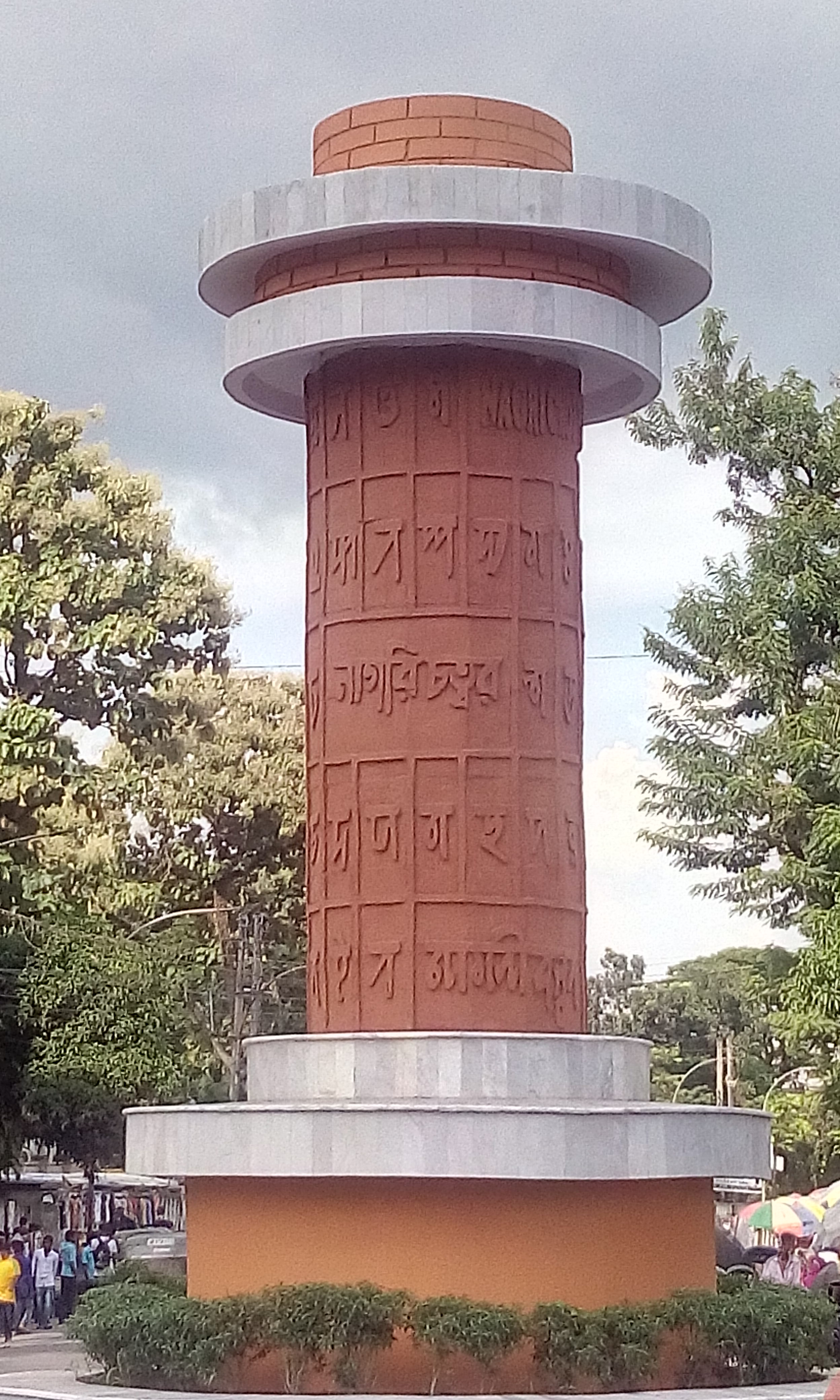
This structure, namely "Nagri Chattar" (Nagri Square), built near Surma river in the city of Sylhet, Bangladesh consists of characters of this script.

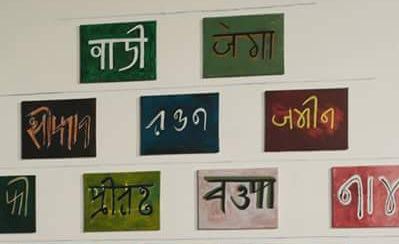
An art exhibition displaying Sylheti Nagri writings in London, UK

The script, never having been a part of any formal education, reached the common people with seeming ease. In the Sylhet region, at one stage literary works in Sylheti Nagri became more popular in usage than the Bengali script. Although the script vastly extended across Bengal, its use "was restricted to a certain class of Muslims", in particular Muslim women. As late as the 1930s, Nagendranath Basu noticed that the Bengali Muslims of Bishnupur, Bankura were using the Bengali alphabet for all purposes, but the Nagri script for puthis. According to George Grierson in his Linguistic Survey of India, the script was hardly used in any formal documentation in comparison to the Bengali script, and was only used for puthi reading or some would sign their names in this script. Many Sylheti Nagri presses fell out of use during the Bangladesh War of Independence and Indo-Pakistani War of 1971, including Islamia Press in Sylhet town which was destroyed by a fire.

=== Revitalisation efforts ===
Research on the script multiplied to its greatest extent in post-colonial Pakistan and independent Bangladesh. In the late 20th century, Munshi Ashraf Hussain, a researcher of Bengali folk literature, contributed immensely to Sylheti Nagri research.

In 2009, the publication of literature in the Nagri script recommenced in Bangladesh through the efforts of Mostafa Selim, who founded a publishing company called Utsho Prokashon based in Dhaka, and Anwar Rashid's New Nation Library in Puran Lane, Sylhet. By 2014, a collection of 25 manuscripts, known as Nagri Grantha Sambhar, was published by Utsho Prokashon's Muhammad Abdul Mannan and Selim. The recent revivals sparked a great interest in the country, and achieved significant coverage in national newspapers, TV and radio channels across Bangladesh. The government enabled free circulation of books about Nagri to be distributed to schools and colleges in Sylhet. A documentary directed by Sarwar Tamizuddin, titled Nagri Lipir Nabajatra, was aired across the country. The Bangla Academy, an institution funded by the Government of Bangladesh to serve as the official body regarding the Bengali language, has begun hosting Nagri bookstalls at the Ekushey Book Fair. In 2014, a Nagri press conference was held at the Pathak Shamabesh Center in Shahbag, a major neighbourhood located in Bangladesh's capital, Dhaka. The Sylhet City Corporation and Sylhet District Council funded the establishment of a £20,000 circular mural at Surma Point known as the Nagri Chattar in 2018, which was designed by Shubhajit Chowdhury. The official building of Sylhet District's Deputy Commissioner has also installed Nagri signboards.

Another aspect of its contemporary revival is it being viewed as a key marker of Sylheti identity, in particular within the diaspora. This revival is primarily driven by efforts to preserve the Sylheti language as an integral part of a cultural heritage, in contrast to the dominance of Standard Bengali. SOAS University of London in the United Kingdom is one institute that has led such initiatives like the "Sylheti Project".

The New Testament is one of the few books that has been translated into Sylheti with the Sylheti Nagri script by James Lloyd-Williams and others in the UK, titled Pobitro Injil Shorif in 2014.

== Letters ==
The Sylheti Nagri script can be divided into vowels and vowel diacritics/marks, consonants and consonant conjuncts, diacritical and punctuation marks. Vowels & consonants are used as alphabet and also as diacritical marks. The script is characterised by its simplistic glyph, with fewer letters than Bengali. The total number of letters is 32; there are 5 vowels and 28 consonants.

=== Vowels ===
The widely accepted number of vowels is 5, although some texts show additional vowels. For example, the diphthong ôi has sometimes been regarded as an additional vowel in its own right. The vowels do not follow the sequence of Bengali alphabet. All the vowels also have their own respective diacritics known as "xar" (ꠇꠣꠞ).

Letter	Diacritic	Transliteration	IPA	As diacritic with ꠇ
ꠀ	ꠣ	a	/a/	ꠇꠣ
ꠁ	ꠤ	i	/i/	ꠇꠤ
ꠃ	ꠥ	u	/u~ʊ/	ꠇꠥ
ꠄ	ꠦ	e	/e~æ~ɛ/	ꠇꠦ
none	ꠂ	oi	/ɔi~oi/	ꠇꠂ
ꠅ	ꠧ	o	/ɔ~o~w/	ꠇꠧ

- "ꠅ" /ɔ/ sounds as the default inherent vowel for the entire script.
- When a vowel sound occurs syllable-initially or when it follows another vowel, it is written using a distinct letter. When a vowel sound follows a consonant (or a consonant cluster), it is written with a diacritic which, depending on the vowel, can appear above, below, before or after the consonant. These vowel marks cannot appear without a consonant and are called xar.
- An exception to the above system is the vowel /ɔ/, which has no vowel mark but is considered inherent in every consonant letter. To denote the absence of the inherent vowel [ɔ] following a consonant, a diacritic called the ꠢꠡꠘ꠆ꠔꠧ hośonto (◌꠆) may be written above the consonant.
- Although there is only one diphthong in the inventory of the script: ◌ꠂ oi /oi/, the phonetic system has, in fact, many diphthongs. Most diphthongs are represented by juxtaposing the graphemes of their constituent vowel elements, with the first taking the form of a diacritic and the second an independent vowel glyph, as in ꠇꠦꠃ /xeu/.

==== Vowel diacritics ====
Vowel diacritics on ꠇ

=== Consonants ===
There are 27 consonants. The names of the letters are typically just the consonant sound with the inherent vowel ꠅ /ɔ/. Since the inherent vowel is assumed and not written, most letters' names look identical to the letter itself, i.e. the name of the letter ꠊ is ghô.

Phonetics →	Occlusive								Nasal		Approximant				Fricative			
Voicing →	Voiceless				Voiced										Voiceless		Voiced	
Velar	ꠇ	xo~ko /xɔ~kɔ/	ꠈ	xó~kó /xɔ́~kɔ́/	ꠉ	go /ɡɔ/	ꠊ	gó /ɡɔ́/									ꠢ	ho /ɦɔ~hɔ/
Palatal	ꠌ	so~co /sɔ~tʃɔ/	ꠍ	só~có /sɔ́~tʃɔ́/	ꠎ	zo~jo /zɔ~dʒɔ/	ꠏ	zó~jó /zɔ́~dʒɔ́/							ꠡ	śo /ʃɔ/		
Retroflex	ꠐ	ṭo /ʈɔ/	ꠑ	ṭó /ʈɔ́/	ꠒ	ḍo /ɖɔ/	ꠓ	ḍó /ɖɔ́/			ꠞ	ro /ɾɔ/	ꠠ	ṛo /ɽɔ/				
Dental	ꠔ	to /t̪ɔ/	ꠕ	tó /t̪ɔ́/	ꠖ	do /d̪ɔ/	ꠗ	dó /d̪ɔ́/	ꠘ	no /nɔ/	ꠟ	lo /lɔ/						
Labial	ꠙ	fo~po /fɔ~ɸɔ~pɔ/	ꠚ	fó~pó /fɔ́~ɸɔ́~pɔ́/	ꠛ	bo /bɔ/	ꠜ	bó /bɔ́/	ꠝ	mo /mɔ/	ꠅ	vo~wo /ʋɔ~wɔ/						

Due to historical sound changes, the so-called "aspirated consonants" cause a higher or rising tone on the following vowel, but the consonants are pronounced just like the unaspirated ones (conceptually similar to Thai and Gurmukhi).

IPA	Normal tone letter	High tone letter	Transcription	IPA transcription	Note
/k~x/	ꠇ	ꠈ	xo / xó	xɔ / xɔ́	Like the k in "kite" or the kh in "Khartoum" depending on its position within vowels.
/g/	ꠉ	ꠊ	go / gó	gɔ / gɔ́	Like the g in "garage".
/t͡ʃ~s/	ꠌ	ꠍ	so / só	sɔ / sɔ́	Like the ch in "chat" or the s in "sun".
/d͡ʒ~z/	ꠎ	ꠏ	zo / zó	zɔ / zɔ́	Like the j in "jungle" or the z in "zoo".
/ʈ/	ꠐ	ꠑ	ṭo / ṭó	ʈɔ / ʈɔ́	Like the t in "tool".
/ɖ/	ꠒ	ꠓ	ḍo / ḍó	ɖɔ / ɖɔ́	Like the d in "doll".
/t̪/	ꠔ	ꠕ	to / tó	t̪ɔ / t̪ɔ́	Like the t in "soviet".
/d̪/	ꠖ	ꠗ	do / dó	d̪ɔ / d̪ɔ́	Like the th in "the".
/n/	ꠘ	n/a	no	nɔ	Like the n in "net".
/p~ɸ~f/	ꠙ	n/a	fo	ɸɔ	Like the p in "pool" or the f in "fun".
/ɸ~f/	n/a	ꠚ	fó	fɔ́	Like the f in "food".
/b/	ꠛ	ꠜ	bo / bó	bɔ / bɔ́	Like the b in "big".
/m/	ꠝ	n/a	mo	mɔ	Like the m in "moon".
/ɾ/	ꠞ	n/a	ro	ɾɔ	Like the r in "rose".
/l/	ꠟ	n/a	lo	lɔ	Like the l in "luck".
/ʃ/	ꠡ	n/a	śo	ʃɔ	Like the sh in "shoe".
/ɦ/	ꠢ	n/a	ho	ɦɔ	Like the h in "head".
/ɽ/	ꠠ	n/a	ṛo	ɽɔ	Like the r in "hurry".

There is a difference between the pronunciation of ꠞ rô and ꠠ ṛô, though in ordinary speech these are pronounced the same as /ɾɔ/.

Like many other Indic scripts, special ligatures for consonant clusters, or conjunct consonants, are used in Sylheti Nagri. For example, ꠞ꠆ꠟ rlô is a conjunct of ꠞ rô and ꠟ lô. However, the number of conjuncts commonly used is lower than other Indic scripts, and as of 2024 many fonts, browsers and word processors do not support conjuncts for Sylheti Nagri.

=== Symbols ===
Symbol	Name	Function	IPA
ꠋ	Anusvara	Voiced velar nasal	/ŋ/
꠆	Hasanta	Suppresses the inherent vowel [ɔ] and forms conjuncts.	–
꠬	Alternate hasanta	Suppresses the inherent vowel [ɔ], but does not form conjuncts.	–

=== Punctuation marks ===
Sylheti Nagari has four poetry marks. Besides, it uses the Brahmic mark daṇḍa as well as some Latin-based punctuation marks.

Mark	Name	Function
꠨	Poetry mark-1	–
꠩	Poetry mark-2	–
꠪	Poetry mark-3	–
꠫	Poetry mark-4	–
।	Daṛi	Marks the end of a declarative sentence, equivalent to English full stop.
⁕	Ful daṛi	Marks the end of a section.
,	Xoma	Separates parts of a sentence.
?	Prośnobudóx sin	Indicates a question or interrogative clause.
!	Aśsorzobudóx sin	
:	Xolon	
;	Semixolon	
-	Haifen	
—	Ḍeś	
( ), { }, [ ]	Bondóni	
/	Bikolfo sin	
‘ ’	Udríti sin	
" "	Zuṛa udríti sin	
...	Borzon sin	

== Sample texts ==
The following is a sample text in Sylheti of Article 1 of the Universal Declaration of Human Rights by the United Nations:

Sylheti in Sylheti Nagari script

ꠗꠣꠞꠣ ১: ꠢꠇꠟ ꠝꠣꠘꠥꠡ ꠡꠣꠗꠤꠘꠜꠣꠛꠦ ꠢꠝꠣꠘ ꠁꠎ꠆ꠎꠔ ꠀꠞ ꠅꠗꠤꠇꠣꠞ ꠟꠁꠀ ꠙꠄꠖꠣ ‘ꠅꠄ। ꠔꠣꠁꠘꠔꠣꠘ ꠛꠤꠛꠦꠇ ꠀꠞ ꠀꠇꠟ ꠀꠍꠦ। ꠄꠞ ꠟꠣꠉꠤ ꠢꠇꠟꠞ ꠄꠇꠎꠘꠦ ꠀꠞꠇꠎꠘꠞ ꠟꠉꠦ ꠛꠤꠞꠣꠖꠞꠤꠞ ꠝꠘ ꠟꠁꠀ ꠀꠌꠞꠘ ꠇꠞꠣ ꠃꠌꠤꠔ।

Sylheti in phonetic Romanization

Dára ex: Hoxol manuś śadínbábe homan ijjot ar odíkar loia foeda óe. Taintan bibex ar axol asé. Er lagi hoxlor exzone aroxzonor loge biradorir mon loia asoron xora usit.

Sylheti in IPA

/d̪áɾa ex | ɦɔxɔl manuʃ ʃad̪ínbábe ɦɔman id͡ʒːɔt̪ aɾ ɔd̪íkaɾ lɔija fɔe̯d̪a ɔ́e̯ ‖ t̪aɪnt̪an bibex aɾ axɔl asé ‖ eɾ lagi ɦɔxlɔɾ exzɔne arɔxzɔnɔɾ lɔge birad̪ɔɾiɾ mɔn lɔia asɔɾɔn xɔɾa usit̪ ‖/

Gloss

Clause 1: All human free-manner-in equal dignity and right taken birth-take do. Their reason and intelligence exist; therefore everyone-indeed one another's towards biradri attitude taken conduct do should.

Translation

Article 1: All human beings are born free and equal in dignity and rights. They are endowed with reason and conscience. Therefore, they should act towards one another in a spirit of brotherhood.

=== Fonts and keyboards ===
In 1997, Sue Lloyd-Williams of STAR produced the first computer font for script. The New Surma is a proprietary font. Noto fonts provides an open source font for the script. Syloti Nagri was added to the Unicode Standard in March 2005, with the release of version 4.1, and is available on Apple devices. Other fonts include Mukter Ahmed's Fonty 18.ttf, developed from manuscripts to include traditional Sylheti numbers. As a routine project of the Metropolitan University, Sylhet, Sabbir Ahmed Shawon and Muhammad Nurul Islam (under the name CapsuleStudio) developed and launched the Syloti Nagri Keyboard, also for Google Play, on 9 December 2017. Different keyboards and fonts are available now:

- Syloti Nagri Notes, by the UK-based Sureware Ltd on Google Play.
- Multiling O Keyboard, with additional app Sylheti Keyboard plugin by Honso, on Google Play.
- Google's Gboard has also made Sylheti (Syloti Nagri) available as an input from April 2019.

== Unicode ==
Syloti Nagri was added to the Unicode Standard in March 2005 with the release of version 4.1.

The Unicode block for Syloti Nagri, is U+A800–U+A82F:

Syloti Nagri^{[1]}^{[2]} Official Unicode Consortium code chart (PDF)
	0	1	2	3	4	5	6	7	8	9	A	B	C	D	E	F
U+A80x	ꠀ	ꠁ	ꠂ	ꠃ	ꠄ	ꠅ	꠆	ꠇ	ꠈ	ꠉ	ꠊ	ꠋ	ꠌ	ꠍ	ꠎ	ꠏ
U+A81x	ꠐ	ꠑ	ꠒ	ꠓ	ꠔ	ꠕ	ꠖ	ꠗ	ꠘ	ꠙ	ꠚ	ꠛ	ꠜ	ꠝ	ꠞ	ꠟ
U+A82x	ꠠ	ꠡ	ꠢ	ꠣ	ꠤ	ꠥ	ꠦ	ꠧ	꠨	꠩	꠪	꠫	꠬			
Notes 1.As of Unicode version 18.0 2.Grey areas indicate non-assigned code points

== See also ==
- Haltunnabi
- History of Sylhet
- List of works written in Sylheti Nagri

== Gallery ==
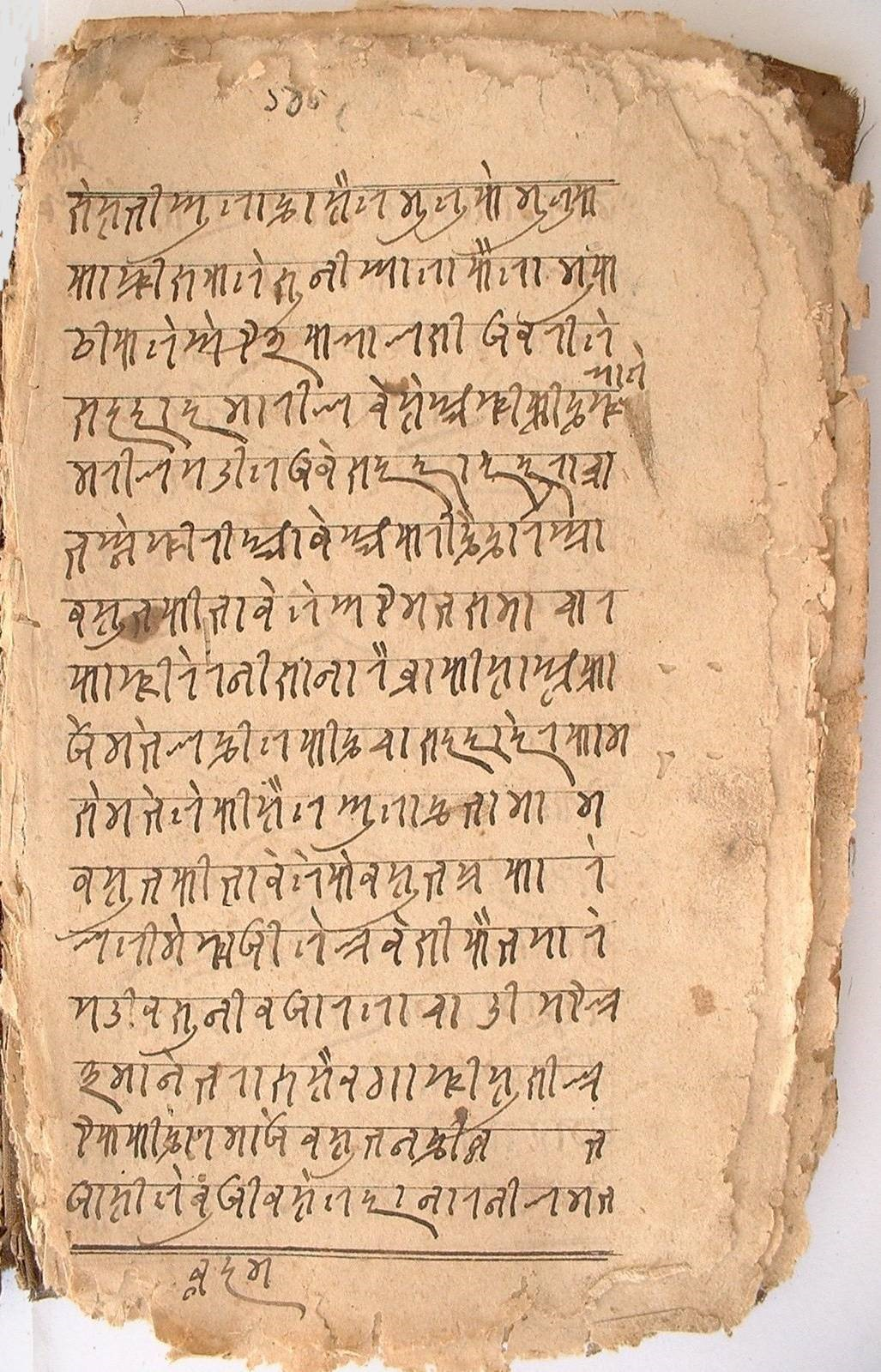
A page from Shoddad-or Boyan (in Sylheti Nagri script) by Pir Azmot Ali

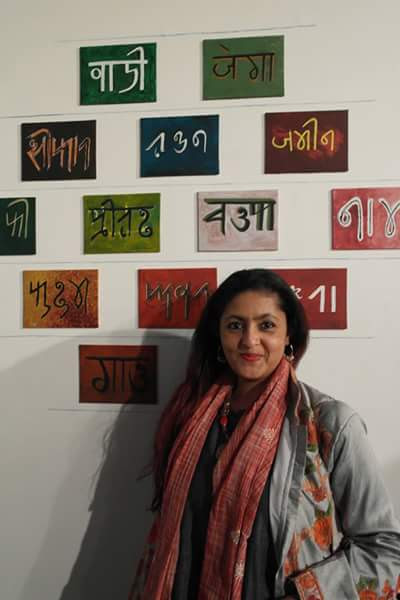
Samples of Sylheti Nagri writing at a London exhibition

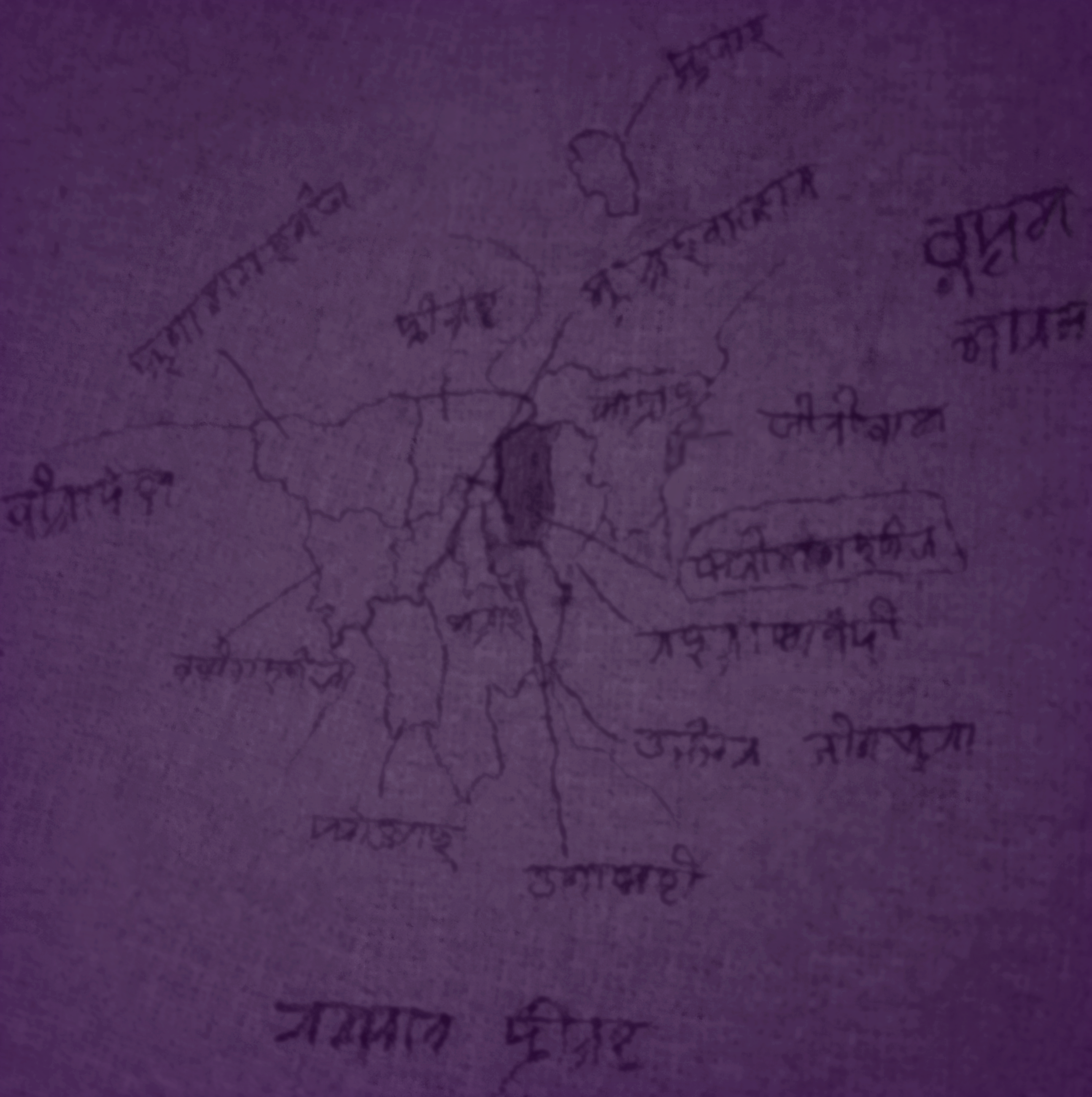
Sylheti Nagri script on a Sylheti nationalist map in Dullabchherra, Karimganj, Assam

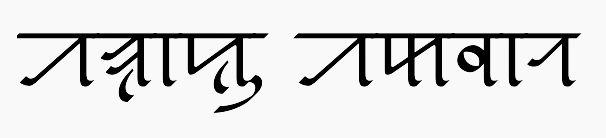
The Takbir (Allāhu akbar) in Sylheti Nagri script

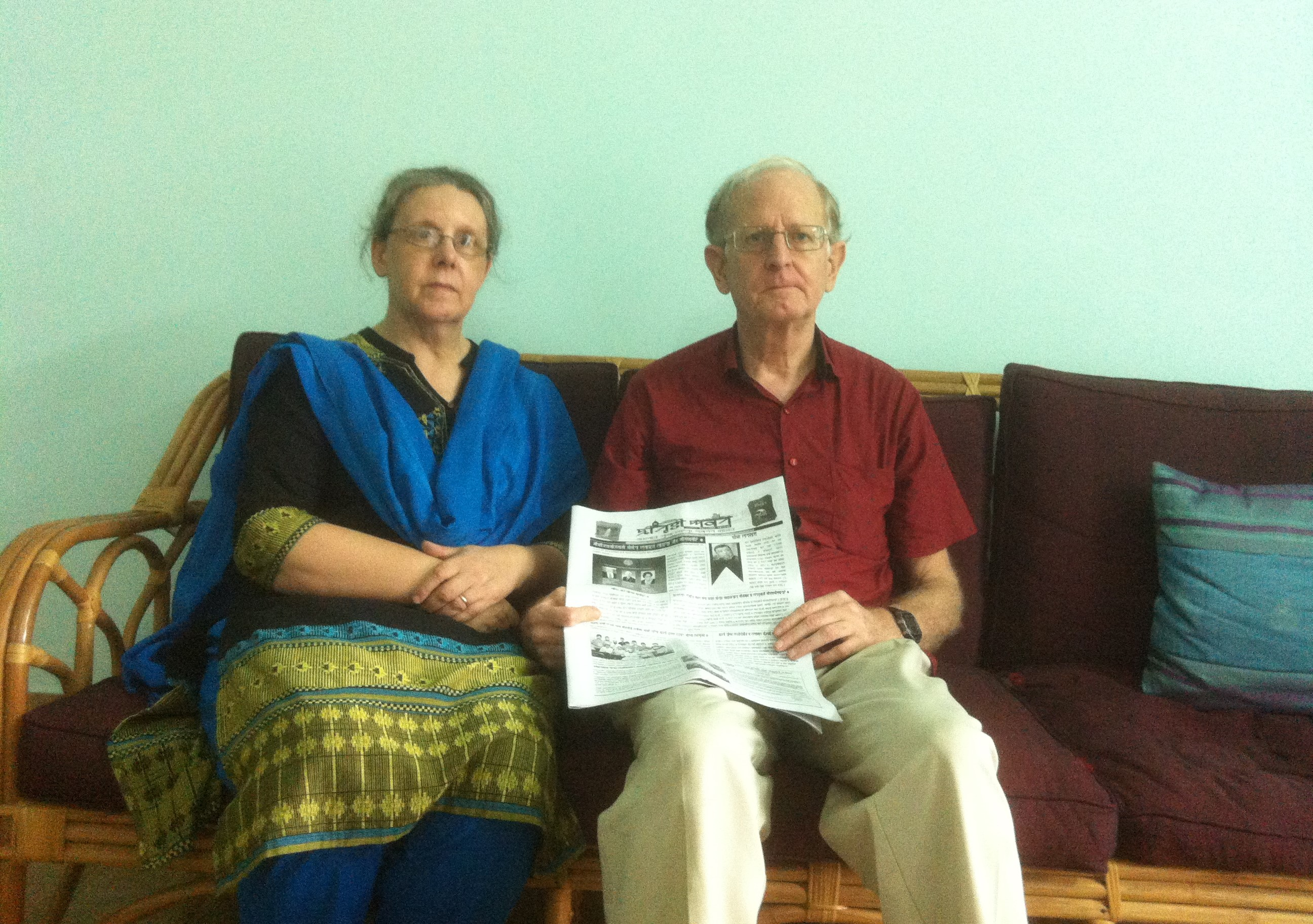
UK-based Sylheti language researchers reading a Sylheti Nagri newspaper

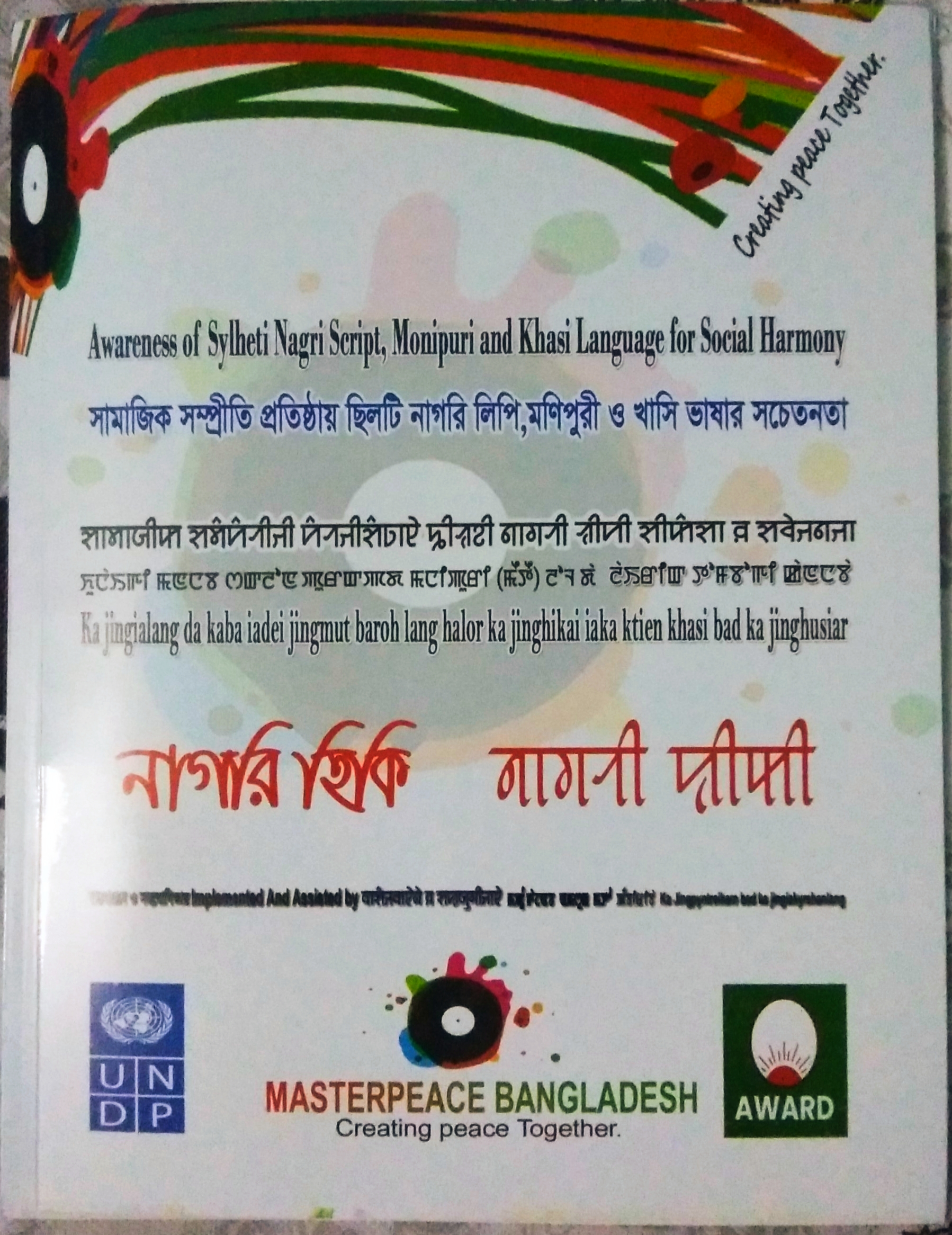
Sylheti Nagri script on the cover of the elementary textbook Nagri Hik

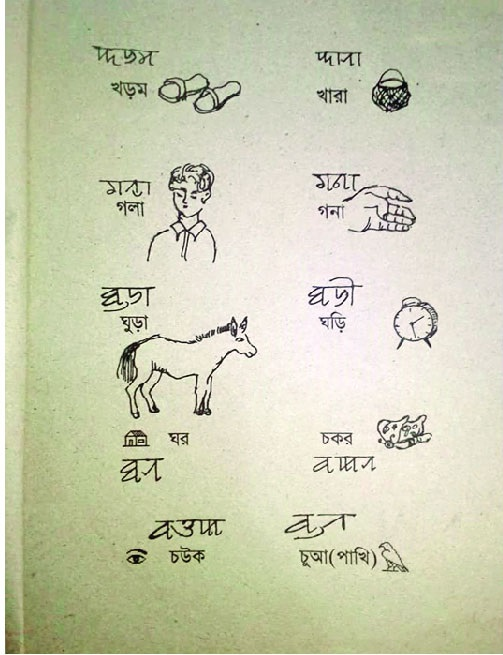
A children's book using the Sylheti Nagri script

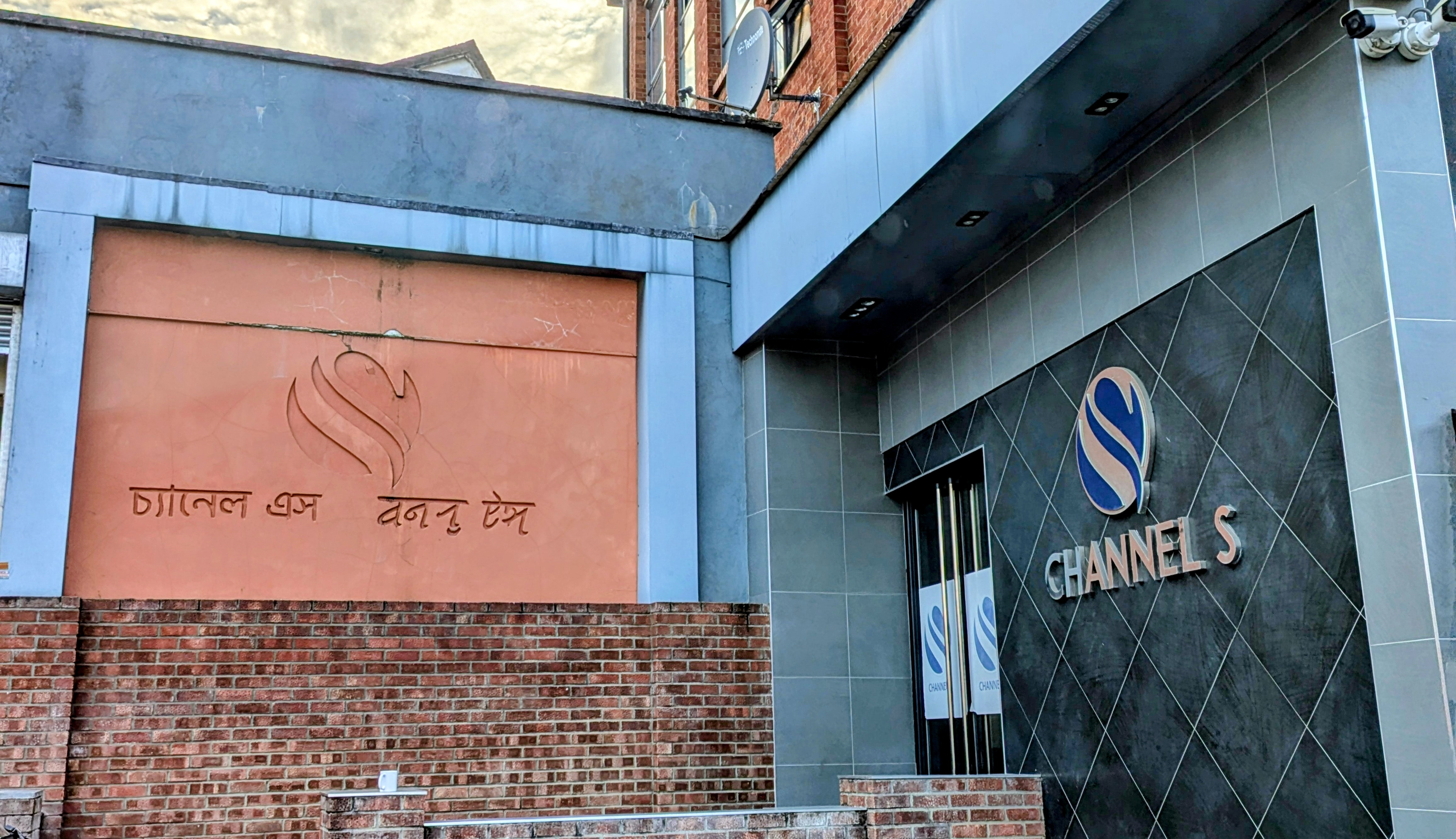
Sylheti Nagri script used at Channel S Studios, London, UK
