= Puthi =

Book of Bengali tales: devotional, historic, fairy, folk

A puthi (Bengali: পুঁথি, Perso-Arab: پوتھی) is a book or writing of poetic fairy tales and religious stories of Bengal and present-day East India, which were read by a senior "educated" person while others would listen. This was used as a medium for education and constructive entertainment.

== Terminology ==
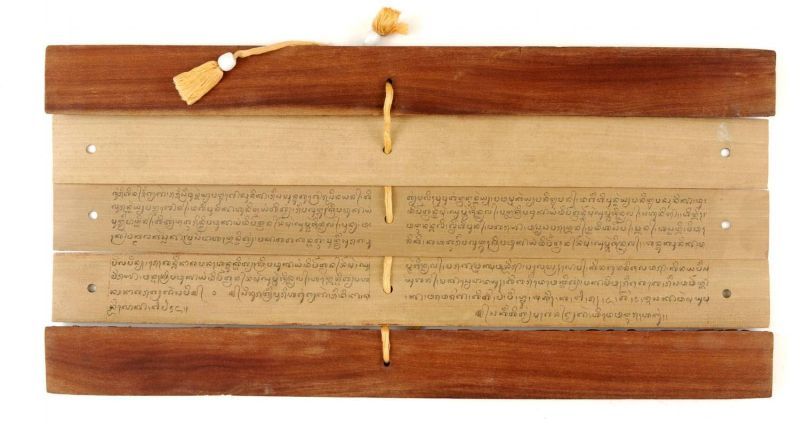
A palm leaf Hindu text manuscript from Bali, Indonesia, showing how the manuscripts were tied into a book.

Puthis were manuscripts written in the Bengali or Odia languages, utilising scripts such as the Odia, Sylheti Nagri, Bengali and Perso-Arabic script. They were mostly used in Bengal, Arakan and East India. Puthi (پوتھی, /po:t̪ʰi:/) is a Sanskrit originated feminine noun which means book.

The pages of puthis could be leaves, leather, sheets of wood, or barks. This was common before the invention of paper. Usually, they were written on one side and bound with a piece of string. This made it resistant to insects as well, allowing it to survive for a long time.

Abdul Karim Sahitya Bisharad collected more than 2,000 puthis. More than 1,000 of them were written by Bengali Muslims. No other person or organization has collected this number of puthis before.

== Script and language ==
Majority of puthis were written in the Bengali script. There have also been puthis written using the Arabic script. The register used in these puthis was predominantly Dobhashi Bengali, a variety of Bengali which lacked the tatsamas present in modern Bengali and used heavily Arabic and Persian vocabulary.

== See also ==
- Bengali literature
