= Humaiun Kobir =

Bangladeshi politician

- হুমায়ুন কবির
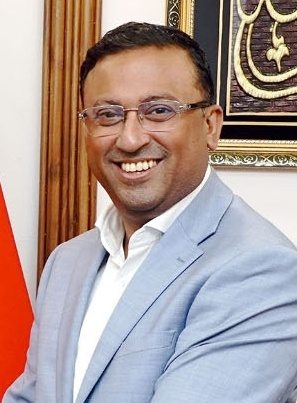
- Kobir, 2026

Minister of State for Foreign Affairs-1
- Incumbent
- Assumed office 21 August 2026 Serving with Shama Obaid
- Prime Minister: Tarique Rahman
- Preceded by: Mohammad Sufiur Rahman

Joint Secretary General (International Affairs) of the Bangladesh Nationalist Party
- Incumbent
- Assumed office 22 October 2025
- Chairperson: Khaleda Zia; Tarique Rahman

Adviser to the Prime Minister of Bangladesh
- In office 17 February 2026 – 21 August 2026
- Prime Minister: Tarique Rahman

Personal details
- Born: 2 October 1977 (age 49) Osmani Nagar, Sylhet, Bangladesh
- Party: Bangladesh Nationalist Party
- Education: University of Sussex; London School of Economics; University of Cambridge; Leeds Beckett University
- Occupation: Politician

Humaiun Kobir is a Bangladeshi politician, UN diplomat and former British civil servant who has been serving as the minister of State for Foreign Affairs of Bangladesh since 2026. Humaiun worked in various offices of the Government of the United Kingdom, including at the Cabinet Office, Ministry of Justice, Mayor of London and the Wales Office.

== Birth & education ==
Kabir was born in Umarpur, Osmani Nagar Upazila, Sylhet. He moved to United Kingdom during his childhood. He earned a bachelor's degree with honors in International Relations from University of Sussex. Later he obtained three separate master's degrees from London School of Economics, University of Cambridge and Leeds Law School.

== Career ==
He worked as a strategy adviser in the office of Mayor of London. He later served as a cabinet adviser at office of the Executive Mayor of Lewisham.

He worked in British government, first in a team within the Cabinet Office under Prime Minister Boris Johnson.

Later, under Prime Minister Rishi Sunak, he served as a private secretary to several cabinet ministers and special advisers at Ministry of Justice and the Wales Office.

=== Political career ===
Kabir was an adviser to Prime Minister Tarique Rahman on foreign affairs, disaster management and relief and civil aviation and tourism, with the rank of a state minister.

He returned to Bangladesh and became active in politics after the fall of Awami League government on 5 August 2024. Before returning to Bangladesh, he worked from London on Bangladesh Nationalist Party (BNP)'s international strategy and diplomatic relations.

On 22 October 2025, he was appointed Joint Secretary General (International Affairs) of BNP. He was a BNP nomination aspirant for the Sylhet-2 constituency, which covers Bishwanath and Osmani Nagar in 12th general election.

== See also ==
- Bangladesh Nationalist Party
