= Tajpur Union =

Tajpur Union তাজপুর ইউনিয়ন
- Union Council
- No. 6 Tajpur Union Council
- Location in Bangladesh
- Country: Bangladesh
- Division: Sylhet Division
- District: Sylhet District
- Upazila: Osmani Nagar Upazila

Population
  - Total: 58,679
- Demonym: Tajpuri
- Time zone: UTC+6 (BST)
- Postal code: 3123
- Website: tazpurup.sylhet.gov.bd

Tajpur Union (Bengali: তাজপুর ইউনিয়ন) is a Union Parishad under Osmani Nagar Upazila of Sylhet District in the division of Sylhet, Bangladesh. It has an area of 12 square kilometres and a population of 58,679.

== History ==
Tajpur was previously part of historic Gauharpur in Aurangapur Pargana. In the mid-14th century, following the Conquest of Gour in 1303, disciples of Shah Jalal such as Shah Tajuddin settled and propagated Islam in Tajpur, whom it is named after today.

In 1987, the union's first ever high school, Muhammad Nur Miah Girls' High School, was opened allowing girls to study at a further level. Thirteen years later, its second high school, KMGD, was opened.

Tajpur Union was first a part of Balaganj Upazila. Osmani Nagar thana was established on 23 March 2001, with Tajpur joining it. It became a part of Osmani Nagar Upazila on 2 June 2014. On 5 January 2019, the union attracted media attention after the Khashi Kapon Knight Riders (Kashikapon) defeated the Sylhet Sixers (a Bangladesh Premier League team) in the finals of a cricket tournament.

== Geography ==
Tajpur Union is located at the northern part of Osmani Nagar Upazila. It shares borders with the Goalabazar and Umarpur Unions and Bishwanath Upazila in the west, Osmanpur and Dayamir Unions in the east, Dayamir and Bishwanath in the north, and Goalabazar and Boaljur Union (Balaganj Upazila) in the south. It has an area of 12 square kilometres.

== Demography ==
Tajpur has a population of 58,679.

== Administration ==
Tajpur constitutes the no. 6 union council of Osmani Nagar Upazila. It contains 52 villages, categorised into 9 wards, and 20 mouzas.

  - Ward 1: Silmanpur, Kashikapon, Suratpur, East Durajpur, Ekashoni
  - Ward 2: Rangiya, Boraya, Birdas, West Durajpur, Kamini Kandi
  - Ward 3: Bharera, Bharera Chowk, Nag-er Kona, Bhareramadhobpur, Saitoda, Ruknpur, Kamarpur
  - Ward 4: Pisra Kandi, Notpur, Char Ishabpur
  - Ward 5: Ravidas, Laalkoilash, Fatehpur-Guptopara, Duliyarband, Matihani, Lamapara
  - Ward 6: Kashipara, Haripur, Hostidur, Kalashara, Raypur, Tajpur, Jiyafok
  - Ward 7: Majlispur, Mollahpara, Doshhaal, Sultanpur, South Majlispur
  - Ward 8: Tajpur, Dighorgoyashpur, Udorkona, Teghori, North Majlispur, Borampur, Islampur-Japur, Baraya, Mullahpara, Bademajlispur, Chanpur
  - Ward 9: Qadipur, Dighoripar, Pathanpara

== Economy and tourism ==
Tajpur has a significant number of British and American immigrants contributing to its economy. It has four haat bazaars and they are Tajpur Bazar, Kashikapon Bazar, Mangalchandi Bazar and Rakhalganj Bazar. It has two post offices (Tajpur and Brahmanshashan). The mazars of the Bibi (Kashipara), Sher Khan (Qodomtola, Chanpur), Syed Khidr (Bharera), Dengai Shah (Shonarpara, Ravidas), Insaan Shah (Lamapara), Walfat Shah (Aminpur), Shah Qutbuddin (Mollahpara), Shah Madar (Laalkoilash) and Bowali Shah (Doshhaal) are popular tourist sites. The Qadipur Dighirpar (Large pond) is a hundred-year old ditch with a peaceful environment located next to a park, mosque and Islamic library.

== Education ==
The Union has a literacy rate of 48.69%. It has 17 primary schools and some include: Kashikapon, Ailakandi, Qadipur, Nagerkona, Doshhaal and Silmanpur. It has one college and forty maktabs. There are ten madrasas and amongst these are Alhaj Mina Begum Dakhil Madrasa, Ashraful Uloom Qadipur, Boraya-Qazirgaon Usmaniya Women's Title Madrasa and Tahfizul Quran Kashikapon-Suratpur Madrasa.

== Language and culture ==
The native population converse in their native Sylheti dialect but can also converse in Standard Bengali. Languages such as Arabic and English are also taught in schools. The Union contains 40 mosques.
