= Muhammad Ashraf Ali =

Bangladeshi politician (died 2015)

- মুহম্মদ আশরাফ আলী

Member of 1st Jatiya Sangsad
- In office 1975–1976
- Preceded by: M. A. G. Osmani
- Succeeded by: Enamul Haque Chowdhury
- Constituency: Sylhet-6

Personal details
- Born: Osmani Nagar, Sylhet District, British Raj
- Died: 22 January 2015 Sylhet, Bangladesh
- Resting place: Shah Jalal Dargah, Sylhet, Bangladesh
- Political party: Awami League, BAKSAL

Muhammad Ashraf Ali (Bengali: মুহম্মদ আশরাফ আলী) was an Awami League politician in Bangladesh and member of parliament for Sylhet-6. He was president of the Sylhet District Awami League and part of the last District Awami League Advisory Council.

== Early life ==
Ali was born in Balaganj Thana, Sylhet District, British Raj (now Osmani Nagar Upazila, Sylhet District, Bangladesh).

== Career ==
In 1968, Ali became the elected president of the Sylhet District branch of the Chhatra League. During the Bangladesh Liberation War of 1971, he was a local freedom organiser. Ali was also a president of the Greater Sylhet Ganadabi Parishad.

Ali was elected to parliament from Sylhet-6 (now known as Sylhet-2) as a BAKSAL candidate in 1975 in a by-election. The constituency covered Bishwanath Thana and Balaganj Thana.

== Death ==
He died in a private hospital in Sylhet on 22 January 2015. His body was honoured by the government in Sylhet Central Shahid Minar and then taken to Osmani Nagar and Shah Jalal Dargah where two janazas were performed, and he was buried in the latter's adjacent graveyard.
