= M. A. G. Osmani =

Bangladeshi military general & revolutionary (1918–1984)

Mohammad Ataul Gani Osmani
- মোহাম্মদ আতাউল গনী ওসমানী
- Osmani in 1975

1st Commander-in-Chief of Bangladesh Army
- In office 12 April 1971 – 6 April 1972
- President: Sheikh Mujibur Rahman; Syed Nazrul Islam; Abu Sayeed Chowdhury
- Prime Minister: Tajuddin Ahmed; Sheikh Mujibur Rahman
- Succeeded by: K. M. Shafiullah (as Chief of Army Staff)

Minister of Posts, Telecommunications and Information Technology
- In office 16 March 1973 – 7 April 1974
- Preceded by: Mollah Jalaluddin Ahmed
- Succeeded by: KM Obaidur Rahman

Minister of Ports Shipping and IWT
- In office 13 April 1972 – 7 April 1974
- Preceded by: Position Established
- Succeeded by: Sheikh Mujibur Rahman

Member of Parliament
- In office 7 March 1973 – 24 January 1975
- Preceded by: Position Established
- Succeeded by: Muhammad Ashraf Ali
- Constituency: Sylhet-6

Personal details
- Born: 1 September 1918 Sunamganj, Assam, British India
- Died: 16 February 1984 (aged 65) London, United Kingdom
- Resting place: Shah Jalal Dargah Cemetery; Sylhet, Bangladesh
- Party: Jatiya Janata Party
- Other political affiliations: Bangladesh Awami League
- Education: Indian Military Academy
- Awards: Independence Award
- Nickname: Bangabir

Military service
- Allegiance: British India (1939–1947); Pakistan (1947–1967); Bangladesh (1971–1972)
- Branch/service: British Indian Army; Pakistan Army; Mukti Bahini; Bangladesh Army
- Years of service: 1939–1967, 1971–1972
- Rank: General
- Unit: Indian Army Service Corps; Punjab Regiment; East Bengal Regiment
- Commands: Commander-in-Chief of Mukti Bahini; Commandant of East Bengal Regimental Centre; CO of 1st East Bengal Regiment; CO of 14th Punjab Regiment; CO of East Pakistan Rifles; Military Operations Directorate of the General Headquarters (Pakistan Army)
- Battles/wars: Second World War; Burma campaign; Indo-Pakistani War of 1965; Bangladesh Liberation War; 1972 Bangladesh Rifles mutiny; First Siege of Dhaka

Muhammad Ataul Gani Osmani (Note: BU, psc) (Note: Bengali: মুহাম্মদ আতাউল গনী ওসমানী) (1 September 1918 – 16 February 1984) was a Bangladeshi military officer, revolutionary and politician. His military career spanned three decades, beginning with his service in the British Indian Army in 1939. He fought in the Burma Campaign during World War II, and after the partition of India in 1947, he joined the Pakistan Army and served in the East Bengal Regiment, retiring as a colonel in 1967. Osmani joined the Provisional Government of Bangladesh in 1971 as the commander-in-chief of the nascent Bangladesh Forces. Regarded as the founder of the Bangladesh Armed Forces, Osmani retired as a four star general from the Bangladesh Army in 1972.

Osmani entered politics in independent Bangladesh, serving as a member of parliament and cabinet minister in the government of Sheikh Mujibur Rahman. Along with Mainul Hosein, he resigned from parliament in opposition to the creation of the one party state of BAKSAL. He advised the government on restoring the chain of command in the military after the 15 August coup. He contested the 1978 Bangladeshi presidential election against Ziaur Rahman. Osmani died in London in 1984 and was buried in his hometown Sylhet.

== Early life ==
Osmani was born into a Bengali Muslim landowning family in Sunamganj, Assam Province, British India, on 1 September 1918. He was a descendant of Shah Nizamuddin Osmani, a 14th-century associate of Shah Jalal. His home village is in what is now Dayamir Union within Osmani Nagar Upazila of Sylhet District, Bangladesh.

Osmani attended Cotton School in Sylhet, matriculating at Sylhet Government Pilot High School in 1934. He studied English and Persian. He won the Pritoria Prize for excellence in English. Osmani studied geography at Aligarh Muslim University, and graduated in 1938. He enrolled as a cadet at the Indian Military Academy the following year.

== Military career ==
When he joined the British Indian Army, Osmani was a member of the 4th Urban Infantry (Indian Territorial Force unit) from 1939 to 1940 while he was a university student. On 5 October 1940, he received a regular commission as a second lieutenant in the British Indian Army's Royal Indian Army Service Corps (RIASC). Osmani was initially attached to the 2nd Battalion, Duke of Wellington Regiment, which was tasked with a New Delhi depot. After he completed the Short Mechanical Transport Course (November 1940 - February 1941) and Junior Tactical Course (February - April 1941), he was attached to a mechanical transport battalion of the XV Corps and posted to Burma during World War II.

=== British Indian Army (1941–1947) ===
Osmani was promoted to the ranks of war-substantive lieutenant and temporary captain on 17 February 1941. He received a battlefield promotion to acting major on 23 February 1942, with further promotions to war-substantive captain (temporary major) on 23 May. Between 1941 and 1945, he held the posts of platoon commander, battalion adjutant, company 2IC and battalion commander. From November 1944 to February 1945, Osmani was a grade-two general staff officer at his formation headquarters, completing the Senior Officers Course after the war.

He was attached to British Indian Army HQ Bihar and Odisha Area from May to July 1946. On 13 July 1946, Osmani was granted a regular commission in the British Indian Army, with a promotion to substantive captain on 5 October 1946. He subsequently completed the Senior Officers Course in February 1947, and was promoted to local lieutenant colonel. He was posted to British Indian Army GHQ in Simla in the Quartermaster General and Ordnance Branches until August 1947. From August to 6 October 1947 he served as GSO-2 at the HQ of Claude Auchinleck in New Delhi. Although Osmani had passed the Indian Civil Service examination, he declined a foreign-service position in 1947 to remain with the Pakistan Army. He witnessed the end of the British Indian Army, representing Pakistan during the division of army assets between India and Pakistan.

=== Pakistan Army ===
After India and Pakistan gained independence in 1947, Osmani joined the Pakistan Army on 7 October 1947. He was promoted to acting lieutenant colonel on 7 January 1948. He was assigned to general-staff headquarters as GSO-1, Coordination, Planning and Personnel.

Osmani attended the Long Term Staff Course at the Command and Staff College, Quetta, Pakistan and served with Yahya Khan, Tikka Khan and A. A. K. Niazi, all of whom led the Pakistan Army against his Bangladesh forces in 1971. After completing the course, Osmani joined the staff of army chief of staff Reginald Hutton in January 1949 and (as chair of a committee tasked by Douglas Gracey to evaluate army enlistment standards) recommended the establishment of cadet colleges in East Pakistan. He later became an assistant adjutant general.

==== Infantry ====
After serving as a staff officer for eight years, Osmani joined the Pakistan Army infantry. With a rank of major and after induction training, he joined the 5/14 Punjab. He was posted as 2IC and company commander of the 5th Punjab Battalion of the 14th Punjab Regiment, part of a brigade commanded by Ayub Khan, in 1950. Osmani became commander of the 105th Brigade Training Team in January 1951 and commander of the 5/14 Punjab in May, followed by a four-month tour of duty in Kashmir and Waziristan.

Osmani disagreed with Commander-in-Chief of the Pakistan Army Gen. Ayub Khan over the treatment of Ishfakul Majid, the senior Bengali army officer in who was falsely accused in the Rawalpindi conspiracy and forced to resign. In August 1951, Osmani left 5/14 Punjab and was posted as third CO of the 1st East Bengal Regiment, the first Bengali to hold the post, in October.

==== East Pakistan (1950–1956) ====
Osmani became the CO of the 1st East Bengal Regiment, stationed in Jessore as part of the 107th Brigade, on 8 November 1951. He chose Bengali songs for regimental marching and its band ("Chol Chol Chol" by Kazi Nazrul Islam, "Gram Chara oi ranga matir poth" by Rabindranath Tagore and Dhono Dhanne Pushpe Bhora by D.L. Roy), and the Brotochari (introduced by Gurusaday Dutta) became the regimental dance. Osmani ordered his NCOs to submit daily situation reports in Bangla. This display of Bengali culture was frowned on by his Punjabi superiors, who disliked the adoption of what they saw as Hindu culture. Osmani was commandant of the East Bengal Regimental Centre in Chittagong from February 1953 to January 1955.

He commanded the 107th Brigade in Jessore from April to October 1953 (when he was promoted to major), rejoining 1 EBR as CO until February 1954. After Osmani completed the GHQ law course and left the EBRC, he became an additional commandant (later deputy director) of the East Pakistan Rifles under the provincial government of East Bengal in March 1955. In the EBR, he expanded the recruitment of non-Bengali minority groups and ended recruiting from West Pakistan.

=== GHQ Pakistan ===
Osmani was promoted to lieutenant colonel and became a senior advisor at CENTO headquarters in Baghdad as part of the Pakistan military delegation from December 1955 to May 1956. He was promoted to acting colonel in May 1956, joining the Pakistan Army GHQ at Rawalpindi as deputy director for military operations (DDMO). In August and September 1957 he served as an acting brigadier, serving as DDMO until May 1966. Osmani received the permanent rank of colonel in 1961, and received advanced weapons training in the United States three years later. He served under Gul Hassan Khan in 1964, who felt that Osmani had been passed over for promotion. Khan allowed him to focus on the Bengal regiments.

By 1958 Osmani was deputy director of the general staff and then deputy director of military operations under Ayub Khan, a position he held until his retirement eight years later. Although he reached the rank of colonel in the first decade of his career, during the next decade he did not receive a promotion. During Osmani's tenure as DDMO in the General Staff Branch, he was a Pakistan Army advisor at CENTO, SEATO and Pakistan Air Defence Committee meetings.

==== Bengali recruitment bottleneck ====
Pakistan mustered six infantry divisions and one armoured brigade after the division of the British Indian army in 1947. These formations were neither fully equipped nor staffed. The number of Bengali officers and soldiers in the Pakistan armed forces was small, due to the British preference for recruiting from the martial races and the departure of many non-Muslim Bengali personnel for the Indian Army. The Pakistan Army raised two battalions of the East Bengal Regiment from 1947 to 1950, and Punjab regiments were inherited from the British Indian Army. The Azad Kashmir Regiment was created soon after the Indo-Pakistani War of 1947.

When Osmani joined GHQ in 1956, three East Bengal regiments and the East Bengal Regimental Centre (EBRC) were part of the Pakistan Army. Over the next nine years the number of Punjab Regiment battalions grew (reorganised in 1956) and reached almost 50, the Frontier Force and Baluch Regiments grew. Many senior army officers believed in the martial-race theory, and considered Bengalis "poor" military material. Pakistani officers favoured mixed regiments over Bengali ones and some officers felt that increasing the number of Bengali formations threatened Army unity.

==== Role in 1965 war ====
Osmani was sidelined by the Pakistani generals, despite his service as DDMO during the Indo-Pakistani War of 1965. Instead he devoted himself to the East Bengal regiments. He complained that the Pakistani press suppressed the contributions of his 1st Bengal unit, which was posted in Kasur during the war. Successive Bengali and non-Bengali COs of the 1 EBR built on Osmani's foundation, and under the command of A. T. K. Haque its battalion received 17 awards for gallantry (including two Sitara-e-Jurats and nine Tamgha-i-Jurats)—the largest number of awards of any Pakistan unit in the war. When Osmani visited the unit and recommended a Nishan-e-Haider for a member, he was reportedly furious when the battalion CO disregarded his recommendation. He organised Bengal regimental reunions, seizing every opportunity to enhance the reputation of Bengali units.

After the war, Osmani chaired the committee tasked with determining future army-reserve and logistical requirements and was president of the Army Sports Control Board from July 1965 to April 1966. On 16 May 1966, he went on leave prior to retirement (LPR). Osmani's successor as DDMO was Rao Farman Ali. Ali wrote that he was horrified at Osmani's treatment by the army; his office was run-down, Osmani was kept out of the loop and office employees treated him with disdain. Osmani was not promoted, perhaps, according to Ali, because he was Bengali and deemed untrustworthy by the high command.

=== Retirement and continued influence ===
Osmani retired from the Pakistan Armed Forces on 16 February 1967. Although he had failed to increase the number of Bengal regiments, the Pakistani high command (at the recommendation of Maj. Gen. Khwaja Wasiuddin) put the existing regiments through a battery of exercises in West Pakistan to test their adaptability and combat readiness. The evaluator of the exercises said the Bengali units performed well, their pride in representing East Pakistan a component of their success, and opposed their replacement with mixed regiments.

The Pakistani high command did not increase the number of Bengali units until 1969, when (after a pledge by Yahya Khan) the number of Bengal Regiment battalions were increased to 10 and all new units were ordered to ensure a minimum 25-percent annual Bengali representation among their recruits. Osmani, known as "Papa Tiger", was revered by the Bengali troops because of his efforts on their behalf. Although he was not the senior-most Bengali officer (Ishfakul Majid, commissioned out of Sandhurst in 1924, was older) and did not reach the highest Bengali rank in the Pakistani army (as did Lt. General Khwaja Wasiuddin), Osmani, Wasiuddin and M. R. Majumdar were patrons of the Bengali troops.

== Political activity ==
Osmani was not directly involved in the Agartala Conspiracy Case. Those involved sought his opinion through Khandker Nazmul Huda (Accused No. 27, sub-sector commander of the BDF in 1971 and a Bangladesh Army colonel in 1975), and Osmani recommended a political solution for the discrimination faced by Bengalis in Pakistan. He had been questioned in 1958, before the trials began, on issues related to the case.

=== Awami League candidate ===
After his retirement Osmani entered East Pakistani politics, joining Sheikh Mujibur Rahman's All Pakistan Awami Muslim League in 1970. As an Awami League candidate, he was elected to the national assembly from the Balaganj-Fenchuganj Upazila area of Sylhet. Osmani did not serve as a Pakistani MNA, because after the beginning of the Bangladesh War of Independence he joined its provisional government.

== Bangladesh War of Independence ==
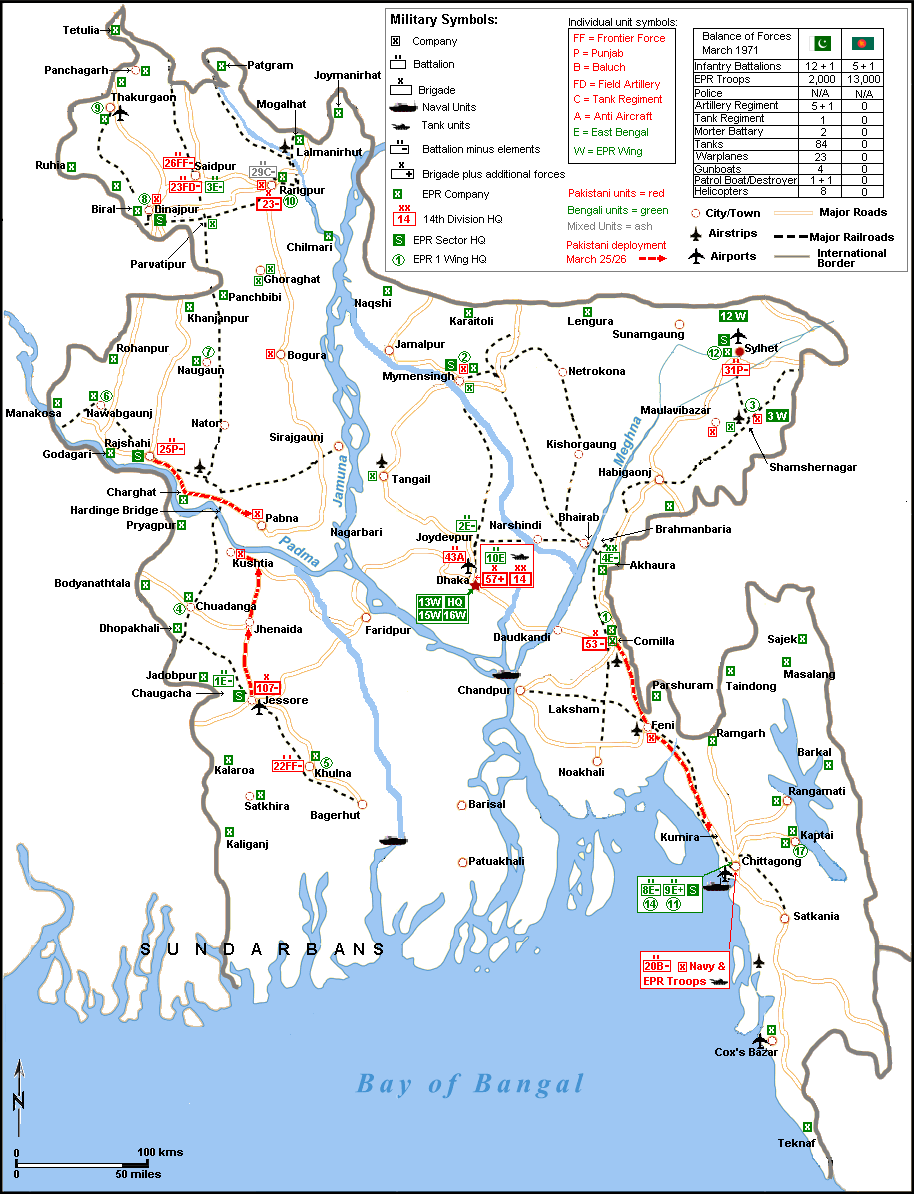
Pakistani and Bengali units on 25 March 1971, during Operation Searchlight; some unit locations are not shown.

Osmani and Ishfakul Majid formed part of the military advisory team for the Awami League leadership in 1971. As the political crisis deepened in March, many Bengali officers of the Pakistan Armed Forces looked to Bengali politicians for guidance and Osmani coordinated the clandestine meetings. Bengali military officers, alarmed by the build-up of Pakistani forces and concerned about their own safety, maintained contact with Rahman; some maintained contact with Awami League leaders through Osmani, who reportedly agreed to coordinate the activities of Bengali units. Toeing the party line, he advised the officers (including M. R. Mazunder, Chittagong martial-law administrator and Rezaul Jalil, CO of the 1st EBR) against "rash" actions.

=== Operation Searchlight ===
Before the crackdown the student and youth wings of the Awami League set up training camps and trained volunteers with Bengali helpers and student cadets. The league leadership declared independence on 7 March 1971. Bengali ex-servicemen held rallies supporting independence; officers and troops kept abreast of the political situation in East Pakistan, which was becoming uncertain and confrontational. Majid and Osmani reportedly designed a military plan of action: capture the Dhaka airport and Chittagong seaport, sealing off the province. The EPR and police would capture Dhaka, aided by Awami League volunteers, and cantonments would be neutralised by Bengali soldiers. Bengali officers advised sabotaging the fuel dumps at Narayanganj and Chittagong to ground Pakistani air power and cripple armed-force mobility.

The Awami League leadership, attempting a political solution, did not endorse action or preparation for conflict by Bengali soldiers before the crackdown. Warnings by Bengali officers that the Pakistan Army was preparing to strike were ignored, and junior Bengali officers were told by their superiors to be prudent and avoid political issues.

The Pakistan Army caught the Bengali political leadership and soldiers by surprise. Resistance to Operation Searchlight was spontaneous and disorganised, and nearly all the Awami League leadership fled to Calcutta. Bengali soldiers were largely unaware of the larger situation; many units performed routine duties as late as 31 March, rebelling only under Pakistani attack. A general amnesty for Bengali troops suggested by Pakistani generals on 31 March was ignored. Group Captain A.K. Khandkar witnessed the departure of Yahya and warned Sheikh Mujibur Rahman of Pakistani troop movements. His 26 March declaration of independence was largely unnoticed. No countrywide communication reached Bengali soldiers to begin the uprising; they rebelled when they were attacked or heard news of the Pakistani attack.

Osmani was at the home of Sheikh Mujibur Rahman when Bengali officers informed Awami League leaders of Yahya Khan's departure and the army movements. After Rahman refused to go into hiding, Osmani hid in Dhaka until 29 March, shaved off his moustache (he was known as "the man attached to a moustache") and left for the Indian border. He went to Jingira, then by boat to Daudkandi (where suspicious residents detained him before the brother of the local member of parliament helped free him). Osmani walked and crossed the Gomoti by boat (with the help of a Bengali army signal corps officer), reaching India by 2 April 1971.

=== Meetings at Teliapara ===
Osmani arrived at Teliapara, where the 2nd and 4th East Bengal Regiments (EBR) established a temporary base with a member of the BSF on 2 April 1971. He held a meeting of Bengali officers on 4 April, attended by M. A. Rab, 2 EBR CO K. M. Shafiullah, 4 EBR CO Khaled Musharraf, 8 EBR CO Ziaur Rahman, Salahuddin Reza, Qazi Nurujjaman and Shafat Jamil. Osmani proposed that the 2nd and 4th EBR occupy Cumilla, and asked Jaman to formulate a fire plan. After objections by other officers that the battalions would incur crippling losses, the proposal was dropped. Zia proposed that all available forces surround Chittagong, to hold the area as long as possible; this idea was also dropped as impractical. The commanders agreed to send two companies (one each from 2 and 4 EBR) to aid the 8th EBR under Ziaur Rahman.

Four sector commanders were appointed: Khaled Musharraf, K M Shafiullah, Abu Osman Chowdhury and Salahuddin Reza. On 7 April, Osmani instructed Q. N. Jaman to oversee operations in Sylhet. The officers agreed that a government in exile should be formed, with the Bengali forces under its authority.

Osmani toured Mukti Bahini positions in Sylhet, and on 9 April he visited Aziz with 2 EBR Charlie Company near Sylhet. That day another conference took place, attended by Director General Rustomji of the BSF and Bengali officers. At the meeting Osmani was elected commander of Bengali forces, and an agreement was reached with Indian officers on logistical assistance. The need to form a Government in exile was agreed, to distinguish the struggle from a mere military revolt. The conference abruptly adjourned when Osmani left after he heard that five PAF jets were inbound. The following day, three more sector commanders were appointed: Nazmul Huq (Rajshahi-Pabna) and captains for Rangpur-Dinajpur and Barisal. The Pakistan Army appointed A. A. K. Niazi GOC for East Pakistan the same day. On 12 April, the Bengali government in exile at Agartola appointed Osmani commander of the Mukti Bahini. With the formation of the Bangladesh government on 17 April 1971, he was reinstated to active duty and appointed commander-in-chief.

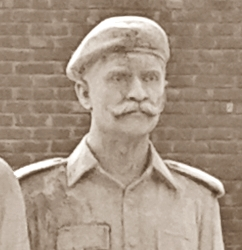
Sculpture of M.A.G. Osmani at Mujibnagar, Khulna

=== Early activities as commander-in-chief ===
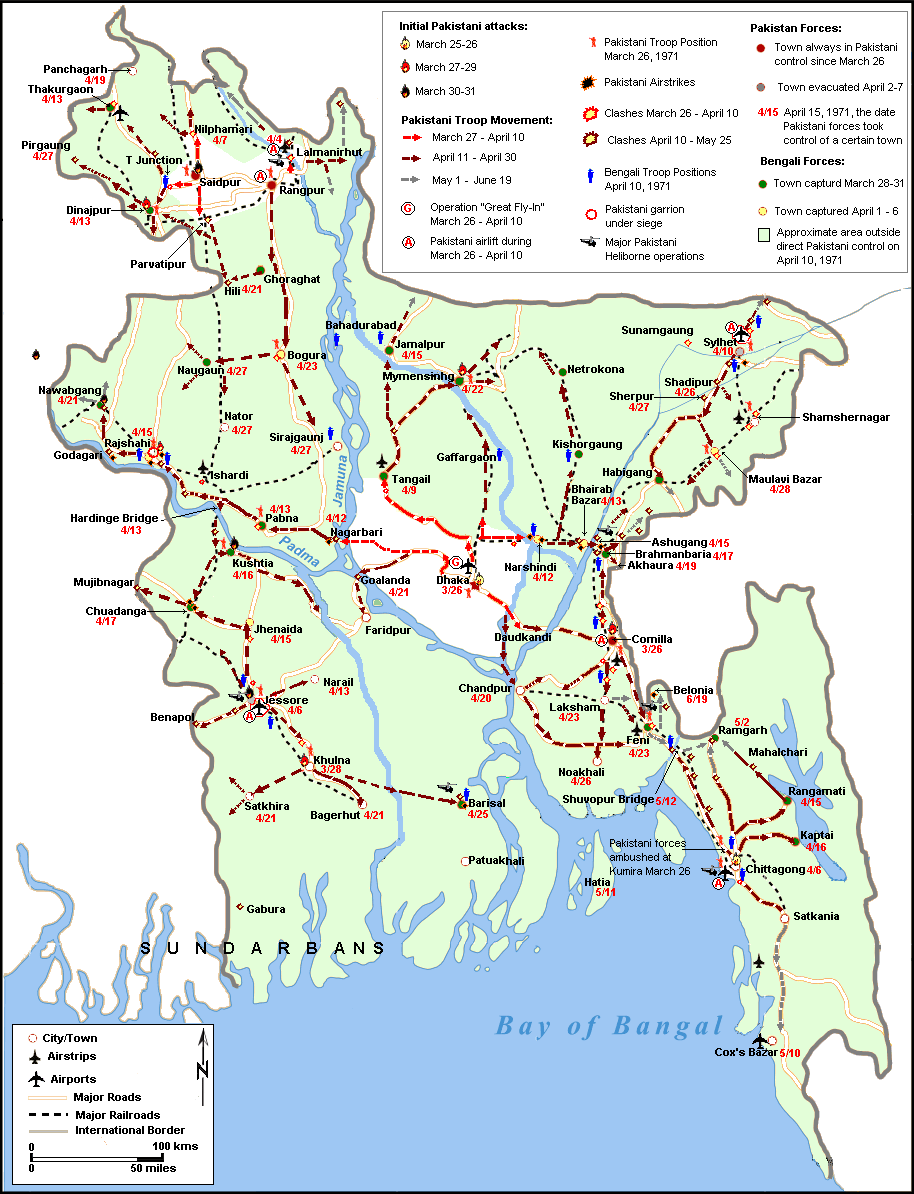
Operation Searchlight: Pakistan army operation 10 April - 19 June. Not to scale; some troop movements and locations are indicative only.

Osmani took command of the Mukhti Bahini after 17 April 1971. Since the Bengali forces were geographically isolated and lacked command staffs and a communications network, real-time command was impossible. Osmani allowed the sector commanders to fight as they saw fit, while he toured the sectors and met with Indian officials in New Delhi and Kolkata concerning weapons and communications. Although India did not offer material aid, it helped design Mukhti Bahini structure and expressed the possibility of future Indian intervention.

The Bengalis put up an unexpectedly stiff resistance, derailing the initial Pakistani estimate of pacifying East Pakistan by 10 April. Their initial success was unsustainable. They began experiencing a lack of trained men, officers, coordination, a central command structure and supplies (despite some aid from the BSF) although most of the country was still free of Pakistani control. The Pakistani Army airlifted its 9th and 16th Infantry Divisions to Bangladesh by 10 April, and was poised to seize the initiative. Amir Abdullah Khan Niazi, after a briefing by the departing East Pakistan GOC, implemented a strategy to clear all large cities of insurgents and secure Chittagong; to control and open all river, road and rail networks; to drive the insurgents away from the country's interior, and to launch combing operations across Bangladesh to wipe out the insurgency.

Bengali field commanders adopted a strategy of "holding as much area for as long as possible". The Bengali political leadership hoped to keep the Pakistanis confined to the cities, while the government in exile sought diplomatic recognition and the resistance prepared for guerrilla warfare and awaited expected Indian military intervention.

=== Indian involvement ===
After the crackdown, Tajuddin Ahmed met with Indian Prime Minister Indira Gandhi on 3 April and requested additional aid. BSF was offering limited aid to the resistance.

Although some Bengali leaders and Indian officers expected prompt Indian military intervention, Sam Manekshaw explained to the Indian cabinet that the army's Eastern Command would not be ready until 15 November at the earliest. The Indian government chose involvement over intervention; Eastern Command took over East Pakistan operations on 29 April, and on 15 May it launched Operation Jackpot to arm, train, equip, supply and advise the Mukti Bahini. An Indian diplomat told Osmani that an expectation of Indian armed intervention in April was unrealistic.

=== Rebuilding the Mukti Bahini ===
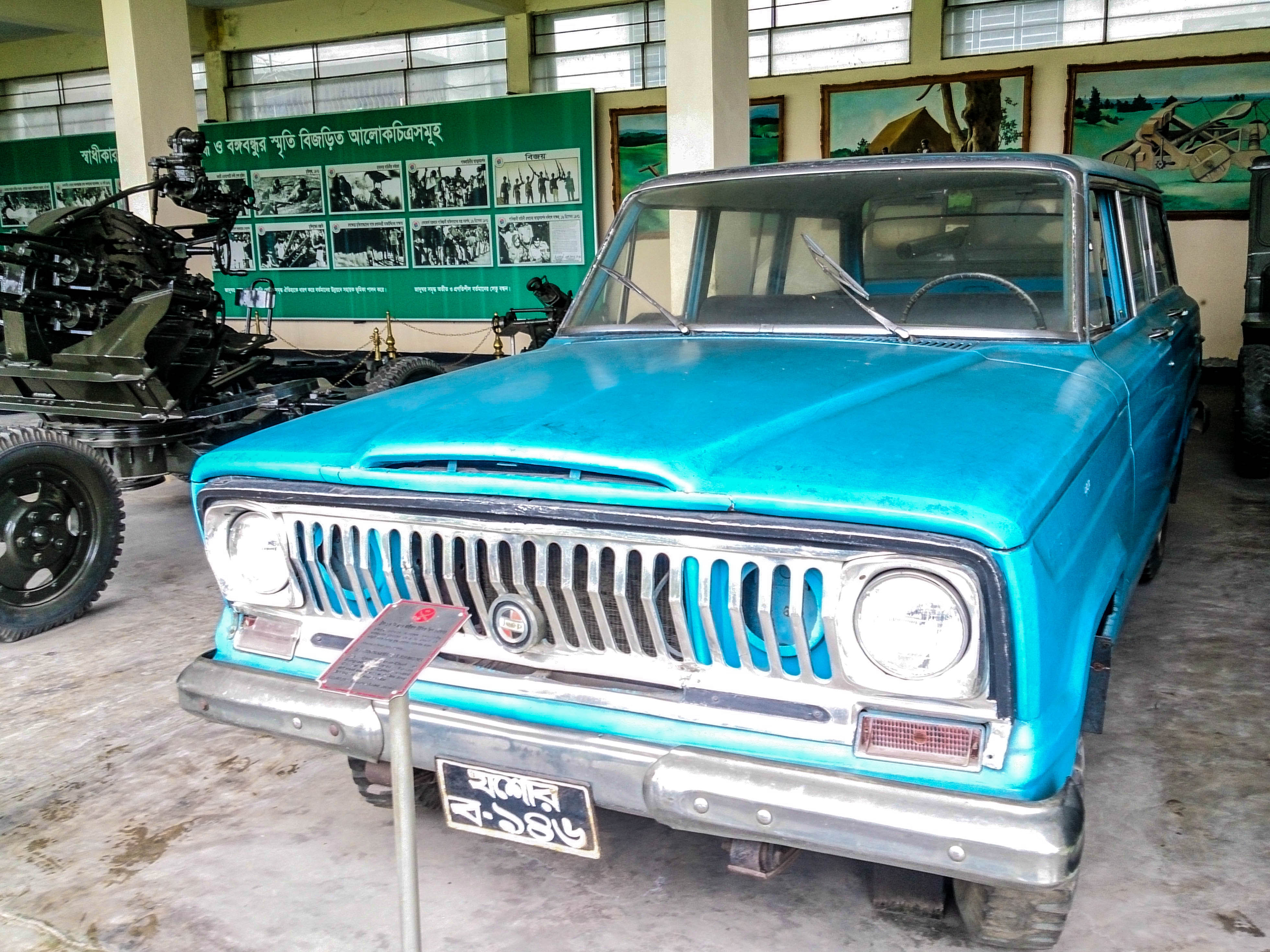
Kaiser Jeep wagon used by Osmani to visit the front during the war

From April to June Osmani toured to boost morale and gather information, meeting with his Indian counterparts and setting up the Bangladeshi command structure. The Indian Army launched Operation Jackpot; by mid-June Bengali soldiers were driven into India, developing the infrastructure for a sustained, coordinated guerrilla campaign. Although the Bengali high command had begun to rebuild and redeploy Mukti Bahini units in mid-May, in June and July, Mukti Bahini activity slacked off and the insurgency faltered. Running the war was difficult because of the shortage of trained officers. From 17,000 active-duty Bengali soldiers (Army and EPR) who faced Pakistan on 25 March 1971, about 4,000 were taken prisoner.

A sector coordinators' conference, chaired by Prime Minister Tajuddin Ahmad, was held by the government in exile from 10 to 15 July. Osmani was absent on the first day of the conference, since he had resigned as commander-in-chief the previous day. A group of Bengali officers had discussed the creation of a war council, with the senior army officers as members. The plan, presented by Q. N. Zaman and supported by Ziaur Rahman, was for a separate operational wing to run the war and lessen the burden on Osmani. Osmani, possibly misinterpreting its intent, resigned, but returned to his post the following day. The conference defined the operational area, strength, command structure and role of the Mukti Bahini. Osmani remained commander-in-chief with M. A. Rab as chief of staff. Bangladesh was divided into 11 combat sectors, with commanders selected (or reconfirmed) for each. Of the eleven proposed sectors eight were organized and active by July, with sectors five and eleven following in August. Sector 10 (east of Teknaf and Khagrachari) was never activated, and it was incorporated into sector one.

The Mukti Bahini was divided into regular forces and freedom fighters. The regular forces consisted of defecting Bengali soldiers and retired Pakistan Army and EPR personnel. They were organised into three brigades, later known as Z, K and S Force. The shortage of trained regular troops meant that most of the forces were former EPR troops or new recruits. Trained army, EPR and police personnel were formed into sector troops: lightly armed conventional units commanded by army officers. The freedom fighters were primarily deployed within Bangladesh.

== Strategy ==
Although Osmani made strategy decisions and liaised with Indian officers from July to December 1971, he did not organize an operation like the Tet Offensive or lead a battle similar to Dien Bien Phu as commander-in-chief. His strategy (a product of his military career and the demands of the situation on the ground) influenced his leadership style, and he relied on his background in the Southeast Asian sector during World War II.

On 15 May the Indian Army began to help build the liberation force, and an Indian officer was appointed liaison between the Bangladesh government in exile and the Indian Army. Khaled Musharraf and Osmani met at Teliapara in Sylhet District and prepared a paper on war strategy. Camps were set up to train a Bangladesh force of 30,000 regular soldiers and 70,000 guerrillas.

=== July–September 1971 ===
Osmani was a conventional soldier with orthodox views, and his initial strategy reflected his background. Uncertainty over the timing, scope and scale of Indian military intervention was another influence. His priority was to raise a conventional force of regular battalions and use them to free an area around Sylhet, organizing countrywide guerrilla activity as a secondary effort. The Bangladesh government in exile asked Osmani to use the one abundant resource available (manpower), and he did not object to the plan of sending thousands of guerrillas into Bangladesh with minimal training. It was hoped that some of the guerrillas would attain expertise through experience.

Although Indian planners assisted in raising three additional battalions and three artillery batteries, they insisted that the guerrillas be given due attention and Osmani did not object. He disagreed with the Indians on the location of the free area; they suggested Mymensingh, but Osmani opted for Sylhet and got his way. While the EBR battalions prepared, in July the Mukti Bahini began deploying 2,000-5,000 guerrillas in Bangladesh each month. At the sector commanders' meeting, the Mukti Bahini agreed to increase raids and ambushes and destroy power stations, railway lines, storage depots, communications systems, bridges and culverts, fuel depots, trains and watercraft to thin out Pakistani forces and increase their vulnerability.

=== Action and reaction (June–September) ===
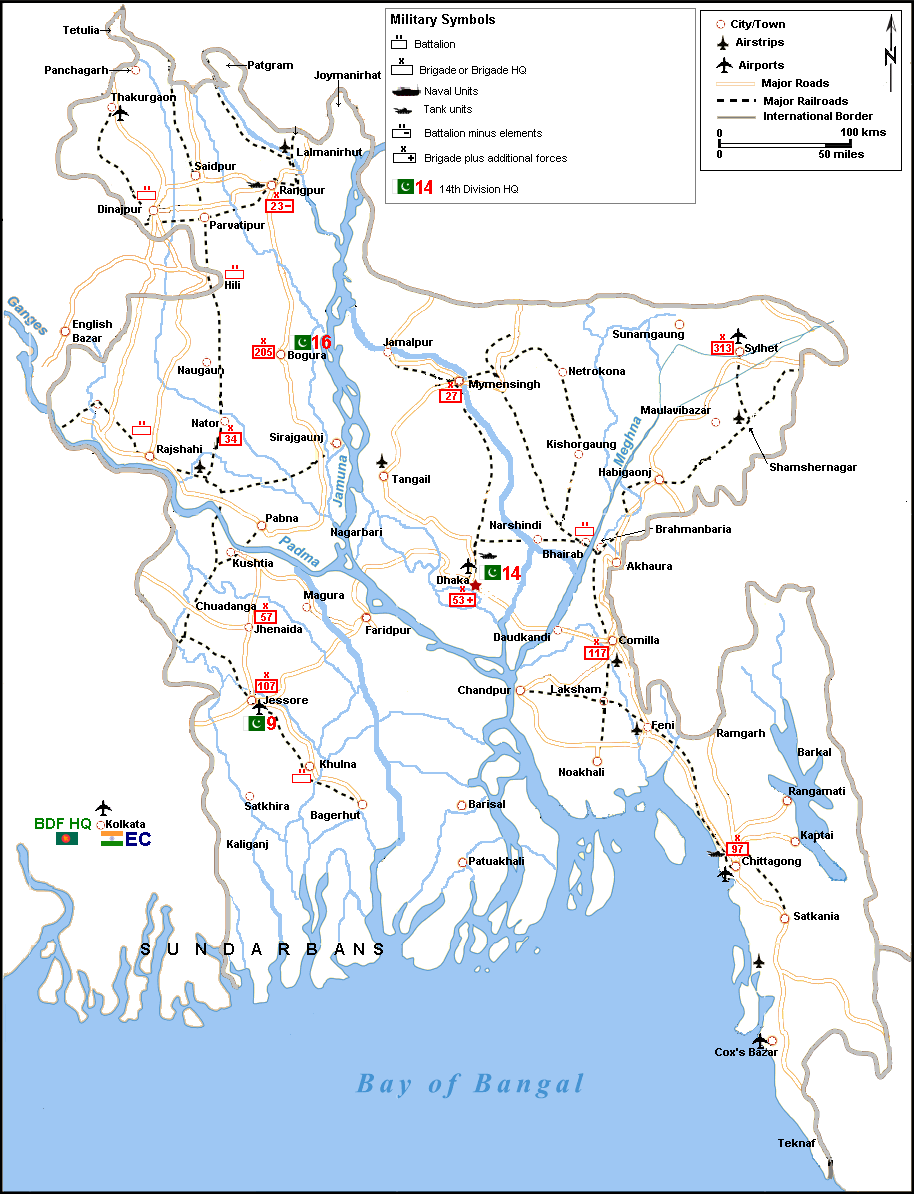
Pakistani deployment in May 1971, after reorganization of Eastern Command forces following Operation Searchlight (some unit locations not shown)

The Pakistan army, after expelling the Mukti Bahini from Bangladesh by May 1971, experienced relative peace in June and July. Mukti Bahini activity had lessened during the months of preparation. The Indian army began shelling border outposts (about half of the 370 outposts were destroyed by the end of July) to facilitate infiltration into occupied territories. Bengali regular forces were not ready for operation until mid-July. With the conflict largely centred around the India-East Pakistan border region, the Pakistani Eastern Command began reorganizing their forces to consolidate control of the province. An East Pakistan Civil Armed Force, with 17 operational wings, was raised from West Pakistani and Bihari volunteers, Razakars (50,000), Al-Badr and Al Shams (5,000 from each unit). Five thousand police were flown in from West Pakistan.

Pakistani authorities continued their campaign, rejecting calls for political compromise and a general amnesty. The army deployed in the towns, and the paramilitary units were deployed in the countryside. EPCAF took over the border-control and internal-security duties of the defunct EPR. Pakistani forces occupied 90 crucial border outposts. Ad hoc units were often created by adding EPCAF troops and Razakars to a skeleton army formation for deployment in forward areas.

=== Monsoon Offensive ===
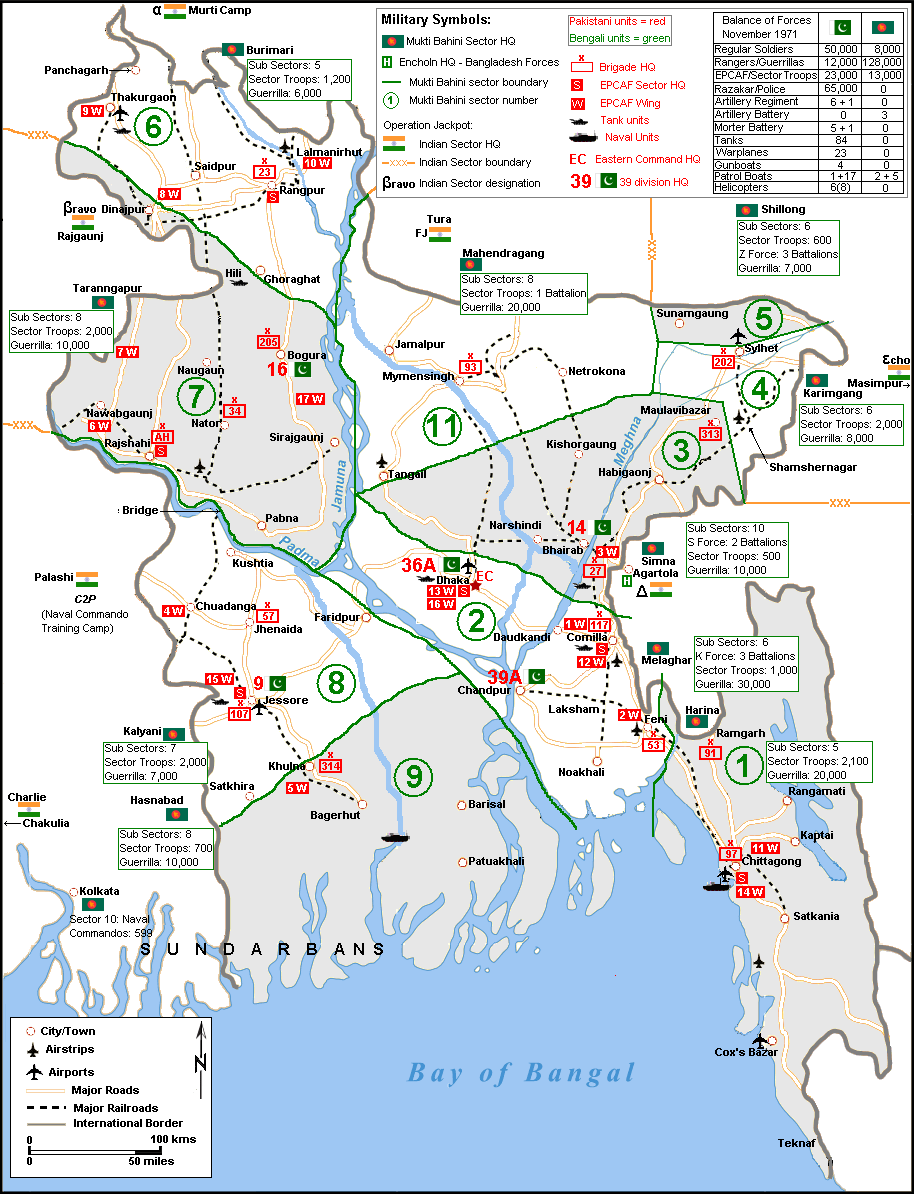
Partial representation of Pakistani and Mukti Bahini forces in November 1971; some location are approximate.

Mukti Bahini numbers and activity began increasing in June, the Pakistan Army deployed Razakars and the EPCAF. Unable to match the Indians shell for shell, they relied on barrages in selected areas and developed an intelligence network. Denied permission to launch preemptive cross-border strikes, artillery ambushes were laid for Mukti Bahini infiltrators and demining operations conducted. By July–August, Pakistani authorities concluded that they had contained the Mukti Bahini's Monsoon Offensive.

The sector commanders reviewed Mukti Bahini activities from June to August, and Osmani made an overall assessment in September. The findings were disappointing; their network had not taken root, with many guerrillas withdrawing under Pakistani pressure. Amid Mukti Bahini supply problems, Bangladesh was losing ground in the international arena. Although regular Bengali regular troops attacked the BoPs with spirit, more training, better communication and coordination with the Indian Army were needed for a successful conventional campaign. The attack on Kamalpur by the 1st EBR was repulsed, but the 3rd EBR attack on Bahadurabad was successful; attacks by the 2nd, 11th and 4th EBR had mixed results.

The failure of the Monsoon Offensive required the Bangladeshi high command to rethink their strategy. Osmani initially considered dismantling the Z, K and S Forces, sending platoons from the forces to aid the Mukti Bahini. Although his associates prevailed against this, he deployed the Z Force battalions to aid the Mukti Bahini around Sylhet.

== Leadership style ==
Osmani did not micro-manage, delegating responsibility to the shorthanded sector commanders; the distance between Kolkata and the sector HQs and the absence of direct links (communications were channeled through the Indian Army) gave him little choice. The absence of an integrated command structure made it impossible to quickly implement strategy. Osmani lived a Spartan life, wore simple clothes, ate soldiers' food and used camp furniture in Kolkata during the war, acting as an example for his men.

He insisted on protocol when dealing with his Indian counterparts. As commander-in-chief, Osmani's position equaled that of Sam Manekshaw; to the Indians, his stubbornness in dealing with the lieutenant generals made him difficult to work with. He was pragmatic enough not to allow protocol to impede the war effort, and did not see Indians working through Khandker as circumventing his authority.

With a brusque manner and volatile temper, Osmani sometimes criticised subordinates in public. He discussed the framework of the future Bangladesh army and other issues unrelated to the war while touring the front, to the bemusement and irritation of fellow officers. Osmani opposed politicising the Bangladesh forces (supported by Prime Minister Tajuddin Ahmed), appointing officers on merit. Although only Awami League members were initially recruited for the Mukti Bahini for security reasons, in September Osmani opened recruitment to all willing to fight for Bangladesh (again with the prime minister's support). Although sector commanders had previously recruited Awami League nonmembers, Osmani turned a blind eye.

He used his image and place in the Bangladesh forces to his advantage. Osmani's problem-solving ability was limited to the agenda of India and the Bangladesh government in exile. He would often break a deadlock by threatening to resign. Osmani's bluff was called only once; when Bangladesh forces were placed under the joint command headed by J. S. Aurora, Ahmed agreed to accept a written resignation and Osmani dropped the issue.

== Controversies ==
=== Mujib Bahini ===
Although Osmani was commander-in-chief of all Bangladesh forces, a number of units were beyond his control. Bengali fighters raised bands to fight the Pakistanis in several areas of Bangladesh (e.g.the Kaderia Bahini, led by Tiger Siddiqi of Tangail is the best-known), and they operated independently. Although Osmani was unconcerned, the Mujib Bahini worried the Bangladesh government in exile. The Mujib Bahini leadership, initially allowed by Osmani to recruit students and other youths, had an organized, well-armed, trained force with a primary allegiance to Sheikh Mujibur Rahman and their commanders rather than the Bangladesh government.

No one doubted the skill of the Mujib Bahini or their commitment to Bangladesh. Trained by Sujan Singh Uban, an Indian Army insurgency expert, they operated under the direction of the R&AW and outside the Bangladesh chain of command. Mujib Bahini members were better trained and armed than their Mukti Bahini counterparts. The Bangladeshi government and military leadership were concerned because most Mujib Bahini recruits were former Mukti Bahini members. Mujib Bahini activities often hindered Mukti Bahini operations, creating misunderstanding and distrust. Clashes occurred between the groups, and the Indian Army and other organizations supporting the Bengali resistance were dissatisfied with Mujib Bahini activity.

The government in exile unsuccessfully attempted to bring the Mukti Bahini under Osmani by diplomatic means, approaching R&AW director Ramnath Kao. By August it was clear that their independence was detrimental to the war effort. Osmani threatened to resign unless they were brought within the chain of command. A meeting with Durga Prasad Dhar on 29 August produced an agreement that Mukti Bahini would inform sector commanders before beginning operations. After another meeting with Ramnath Kao on 18 September, R&AW did not relinquish their control of the Mukti Bahini.

On 21 October Prime Minister Tajuddin Ahmed met with Indira Gandhi, who ordered Dhar to resolve the issue. He told B. N. Sarkar to meet with Mujib Bahini leaders and take.

=== Absence from surrender ceremony ===
There are various opposing view points why General Osmani was absent from the surrender ceremony. According to Indian officer Major General KV Krishna Rao, Osmani's helicopter was shot at by the Pakistan army, and it was not flight-ready to transport him to Dhaka. Others claim that the helicopter was shot down in an area that was cleared by the Indian army, and the Indian rescue jeep arrived at the scene very quickly after the incident. This issue was not investigated by either the Indian or Bangladesh army, and remained unclear.

=== Medals ===
The Bangladeshi government issued four medals of valor to the freedom fighters: the Bir Sreshtho, Bir Uttom, Bir Bikrom and Bir Protik. The list of recipients was made by Osmani and several sector commanders at the beginning of 1972. When it was published, it was criticised and initially cancelled; Osmani was accused of bias for supporting the list.

== Bangladesh Army general ==
After the war ended with the surrender of the Pakistan armed forces to the joint command of India and Bangladesh on 16 December 1971, Osmani arrived in Dhaka on 22 December and set up his HQ (probably in the Log Area HQ Building in the Dhaka cantonment). On 9 January 1972, he arranged an honor guard to greet Sheikh Mujibur Rahman on his return to Tejgaon Airport. The Bangladeshi government decided to promote him to a four-star ranked officer (the first in Bangladeshi history) through a battlefield promotion to maintain the chain of command in the army. He was promoted on 7 April 1972, effective retroactively on 16 December 1971.

=== Sector commander conference (2–11 January 1972) ===
Osmani and the Mukti Bahini senior sector commanders met in Dhaka from 2 to 11 January 1972 to discuss the future of the Bangladesh armed forces and other issues. Wounded sector-eleven commander Abu Taher and the commander of the closed sector nine were not present. A committee was set up to form a national militia from the Mukti Bahini and members of the former East Pakistan Rifles. Sector-three commander A. N. M. Nuruzzaman was chosen to command the militia.

The armed forces were reorganized, with army, navy, air force and police personnel ordered to rejoin their respective organizations and former EPR members joining the new Bangladesh Rifles.

=== Disturbance at Pilkhana ===
On 16 February 1972, tension between Mukti Bahini members and former EPR members who had not fought in the war erupted into a shootout in Pilkhana. Although Osmani was informed of the incident, he was unable to enter Pilkhana due to the ongoing gunfire. The firing stopped at the arrival of President Mujibur Rahman, and Osmani. Rahman defused the situation. It was decided to keep the EPR intact as the Bangladesh Rifles and create another force, Jatiya Rakkhi Bahini, from the Mukti Bahini members. In April 1972 the Bangladeshi government abolished the post of commander-in-chief, replacing it with a Chief of Army Staff, Chief of Air Staff and Chief of Naval Staff to separate the services' command structures.

== Cabinet minister ==
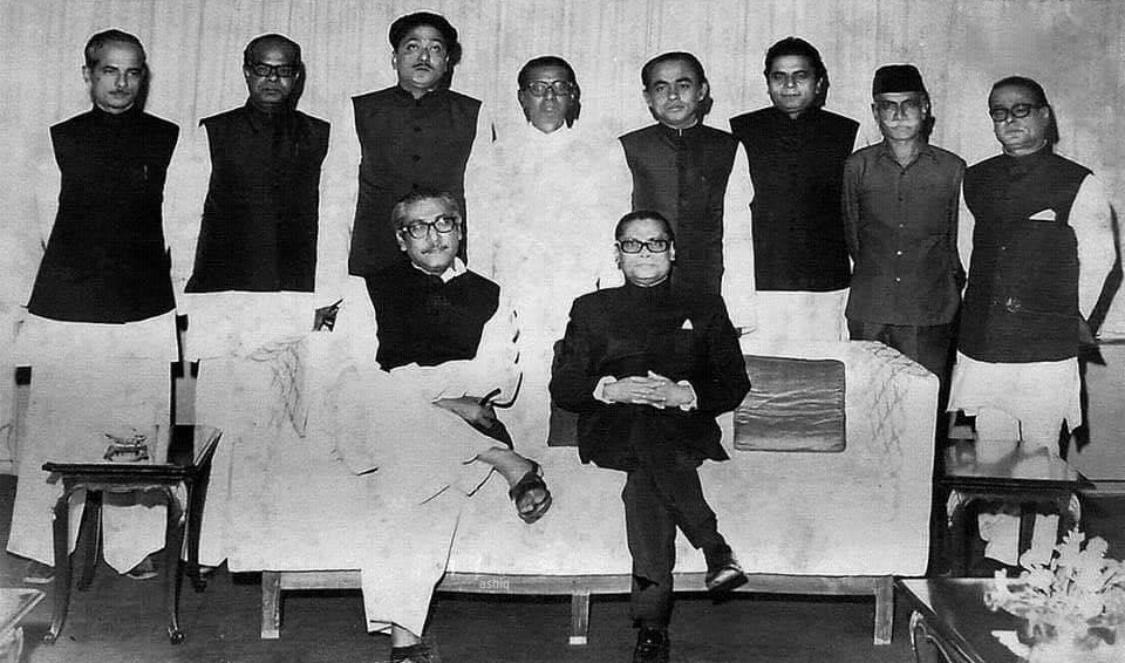
Osmani with Sheikh Mujibur Rahman, Abu Sayeed Chowdhury, Abdul Malek Ukil, and Mizanur Rahman Chowdhury

Although Osmani may have hoped to become defense minister, when the government abolished the post of commander-in-chief he retired from the Army on 7 April and was appointed Minister for Air and Inland Water Transport five days later (armed-forces personnel may not hold political office).

Osmani resigned from the cabinet in May 1975, after the introduction of a one-party government in accordance with the fourth amendment to the constitution. He and Mainul Hosein resigned from the Awami League in protest of the abolition of democracy in Bangladesh by Sheikh Mujibur Rahman. Osmani briefly was an advisor to the president on 29 August 1975, after Rahman's assassination.

=== Army chief of staff ===
M. A. Rab, the first Chief of Staff of the Bangladesh Army (12 April 1971 - 7 April 1972), was promoted to Major general and retired on 7 April 1972. Osmani, reportedly consulted about his successor, recommended K. M. Shafiullah. The four serving senior army officers who joined Mukti Bahini in March 1971 from the Pakistan Army were Salahuddin Mohammad Reza, Chitta Ranjan Dutta, Ziaur Rahman and Shafiullah. Ziaur Rahman joined the war on 25 March 1971, and Shafiullah joined three days later. Although they were commissioned in the Pakistan Army on the same day (completing the 12th PMA Long Course on 18 September 1955), Rahman was above Shafiullah in the final rankings. Osmani disliked Rahman, and wanted to discharge him after the battle of Kamalpur. However, Osmani may not have made a recommendation and Shafiullah's appointment may have been a political decision.

=== Cadet college crisis ===
In 1972, the Bangladeshi government issued a presidential decree in 1972 changing the cadet colleges to government colleges. A delegation of former cadets visited Ziaur Rahman, who helped them obtain an appointment with Osmani. Osmani discussed the issue with President Mujib Rahman, and the decree was withdrawn.

=== Khwaja Wasiuddin ===
Khwaja Wasiuddin was the most senior ranked East Pakistani officer in the Pakistan Army after the forced retirement of Maj. Gen. Ishfakul Majid in 1951. Wasiuddin was ranked Lieutenant General commanded the Pakistan Army's II Corps in 1971 (based in Multan, Punjab). He planned to defect but was unable to do so when he was posted to Rawalpindi Army HQ as the master general of ordnance. After Pakistan's defeat, he opted for Bangladesh and was interned in his home. Wasiuddin went to London in October 1972 before coming to Bangladesh. Osmani and Wasiuddin served together in 1959 at Rawalpindi GHQ, and they had a cordial relationship.

Osmani met Wasiuddin at the airport, and introduced him to Awami League leaders. At age 54, Wasiuddin's experience would have benefited the Bangladesh Army. It was rumoured that Osmani would recommend him to the government as Army Chief of Staff, but some Mukti Bahini members of the army staff threatened to resign. Although Osmani was reportedly hurt by the turn of events, Wasiuddin received an ambassadorship. When Shafiullah (who replaced Rab as Chief of Staff in April) asked Rahman about the rumours, the president reportedly said that only a tested patriot would be a chief of staff.

== Presidential defense advisor ==
Osmani did not support the 15 August 1975 assassinations, and did not tolerate undue criticism of Sheikh Mujibur Rahman. He accepted a post as defense advisor (the equivalent of a cabinet minister) to Khondaker Mostaq Ahmad, who took over as president after the 15 August coup and may have been involved. Osmani, who ignored advice to avoid the Mostaq government, was appointed to the post after Ziaur Rahman was appointed Army Chief of Staff on 24 August 1975 and Khalilur Rahman became Chief of Staff in the Defense Ministry. Although it was a cabinet post, Osmani did not draw a salary. He visited several Army formations, stressing the need for discipline and morale, and may have hoped to prevent further bloodshed with his influence on the armed forces. As defense advisor, he did not oppose the promotion of the 15 August coup leaders or the reinstatement of retired army officers involved in the coup. The coup leaders had installed themselves in Bangabhaban, disregarding the army chain of command, and Osmani accepted the situation. He tried to implement the decision to disband the Jatiya Rakkhi Bahini, placing its members in police and Ansar organizations, before Ziaur Rahman received approval to integrate Rakkhi Bahini formations into the army in October 1975. The coup leaders maintained control of the 1st Bengal Lancers and 2nd Field Artillery Regiment (involved in the 15 August coup) and deployed outside the army chain of command. Their actions, demonstrating the weakness of the chain of command, created a de facto parallel command structure.

When Khaled Musharraf learned of the killing of four political leaders in Dhaka Central Jail, he and some staff went to Bangabhaban to negotiate a peaceful transfer of power. Khandker Mostaq and Osmani spent the day negotiating, and Shafaat Jamil came to Bangabhaban to meet Musharraf. As he and his soldiers entered the meeting room, he heard Mostaq browbeating Musharraf, "I have seen many brigadiers and general of [the] Pakistan Army! Don't try to teach me!" This angered the 2IC of the 1st East Bengal Regiment, who drew his gun and said, "And now you will see majors of Bangladesh Army." Mostaq dropped to the floor, Osmani stood between him and the officers and then asked Jamil to restore order. After Mostaq resigned and a new government was formed, Osmani resigned.

== Presidential Campaign ==
Osmani later stood as a Presidential candidate against CMLA Lt. General Ziaur Rahman. As the army had complete control over the electoral process, Osmani lost by a landslide.

== Awards and decorations ==

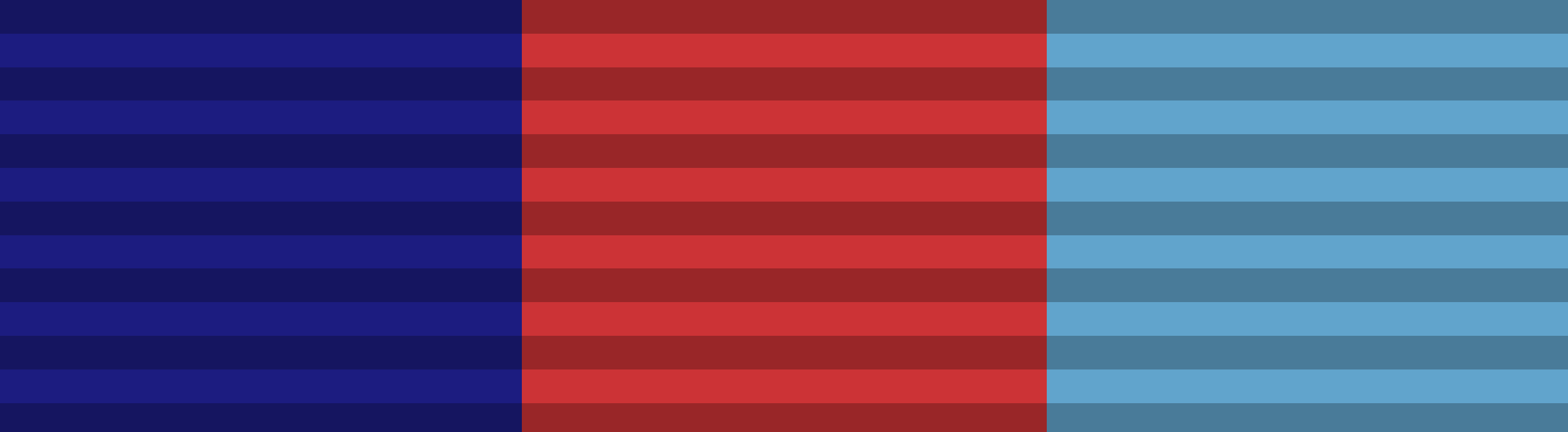

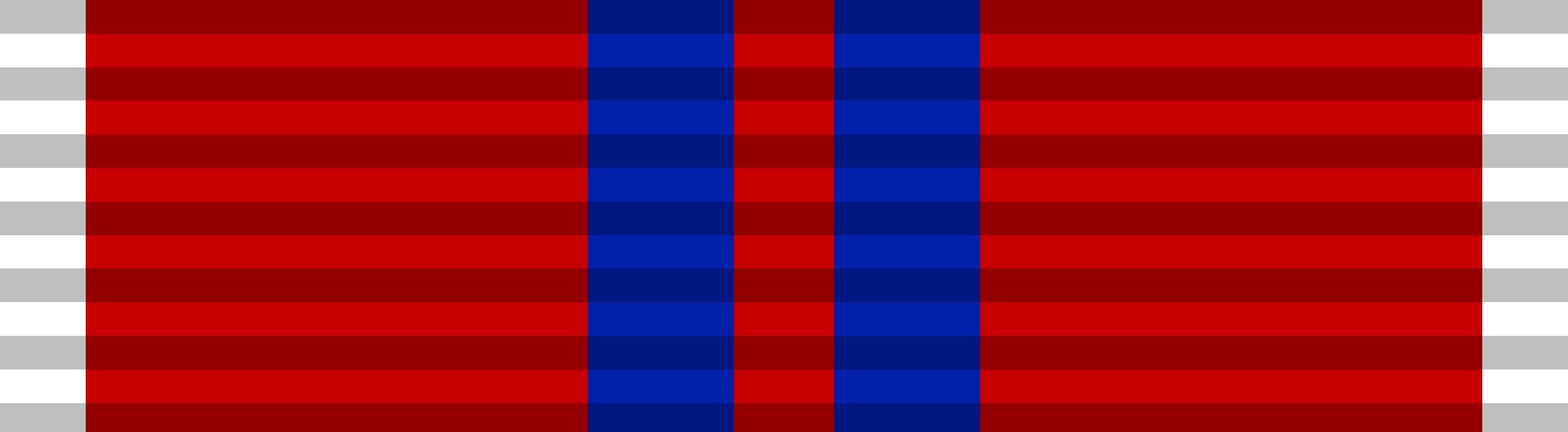

Independence Award (Independence Award) (posthumous)	Joy Padak (Victory Medal)	Songbidhan Padak (Constitution Medal)	
Tamgha-e-Jang 1965 War (War Medal 1965)	Pakistan Tamgha (Pakistan Medal) 1947	Tamgha-e-Jamhuria (Republic Commemoration Medal) 1956	1939-1945 Star
Burma Star	War Medal 1939-1945	India Service Medal 1939–1945	Queen Elizabeth II Coronation Medal (1953)

== Death ==
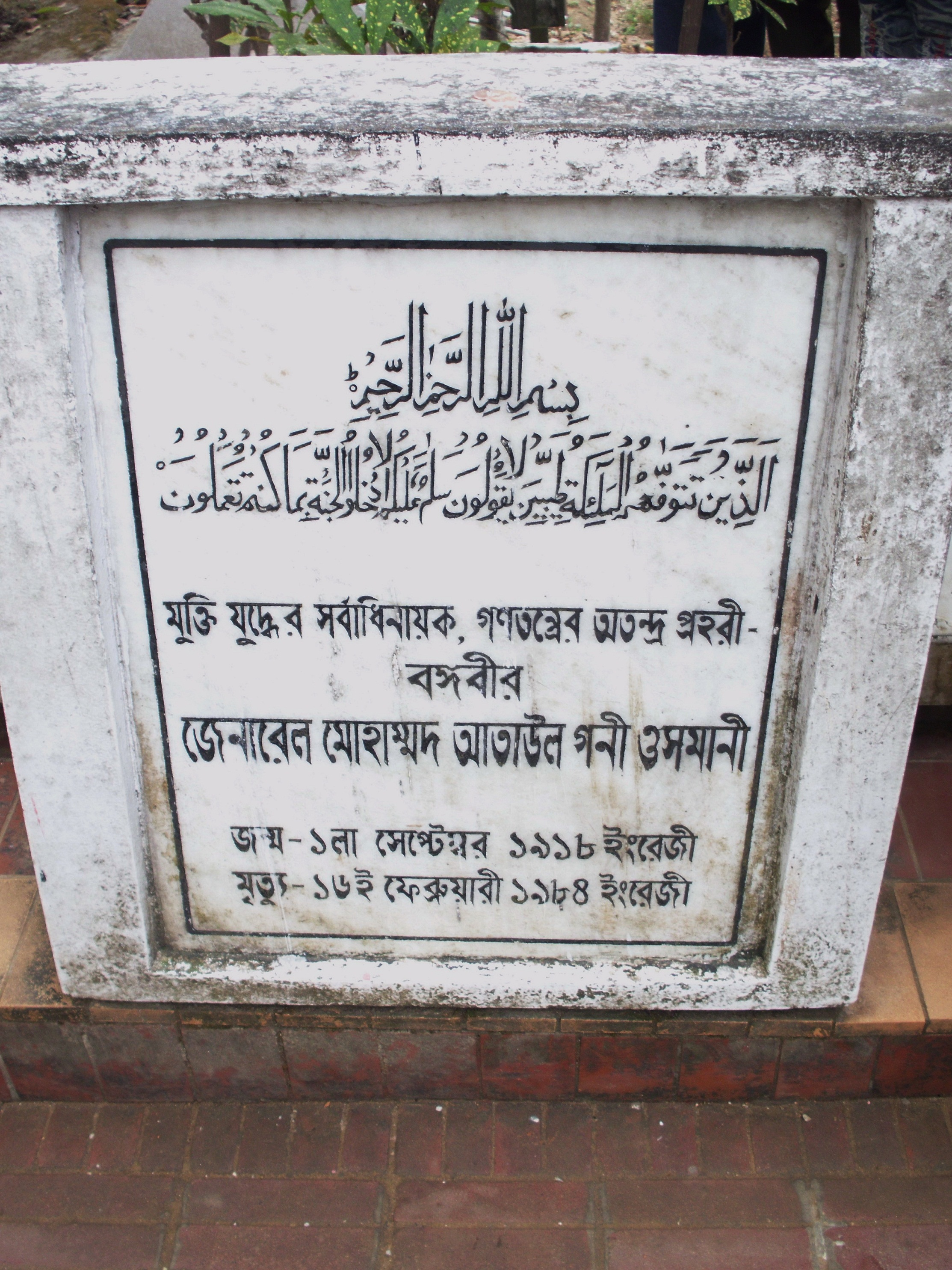
Epitaph of Osmani at the Shah Jalal Dargah

In 1983, at age 65, Osmani was diagnosed with cancer at the Combined Military Hospital (CMH) in Dhaka and was flown to London for treatment at St Bartholomew's Hospital at government expense. Most of his time in the UK was spent at the home of his nephew and niece, Mashahid Ali and Sabequa Chowdhury. He died on 16 February 1984. Osmani's body was flown to Bangladesh, and he was buried with full military honours adjacent to his mother's grave in Darga, Sylhet.

== Legacy ==
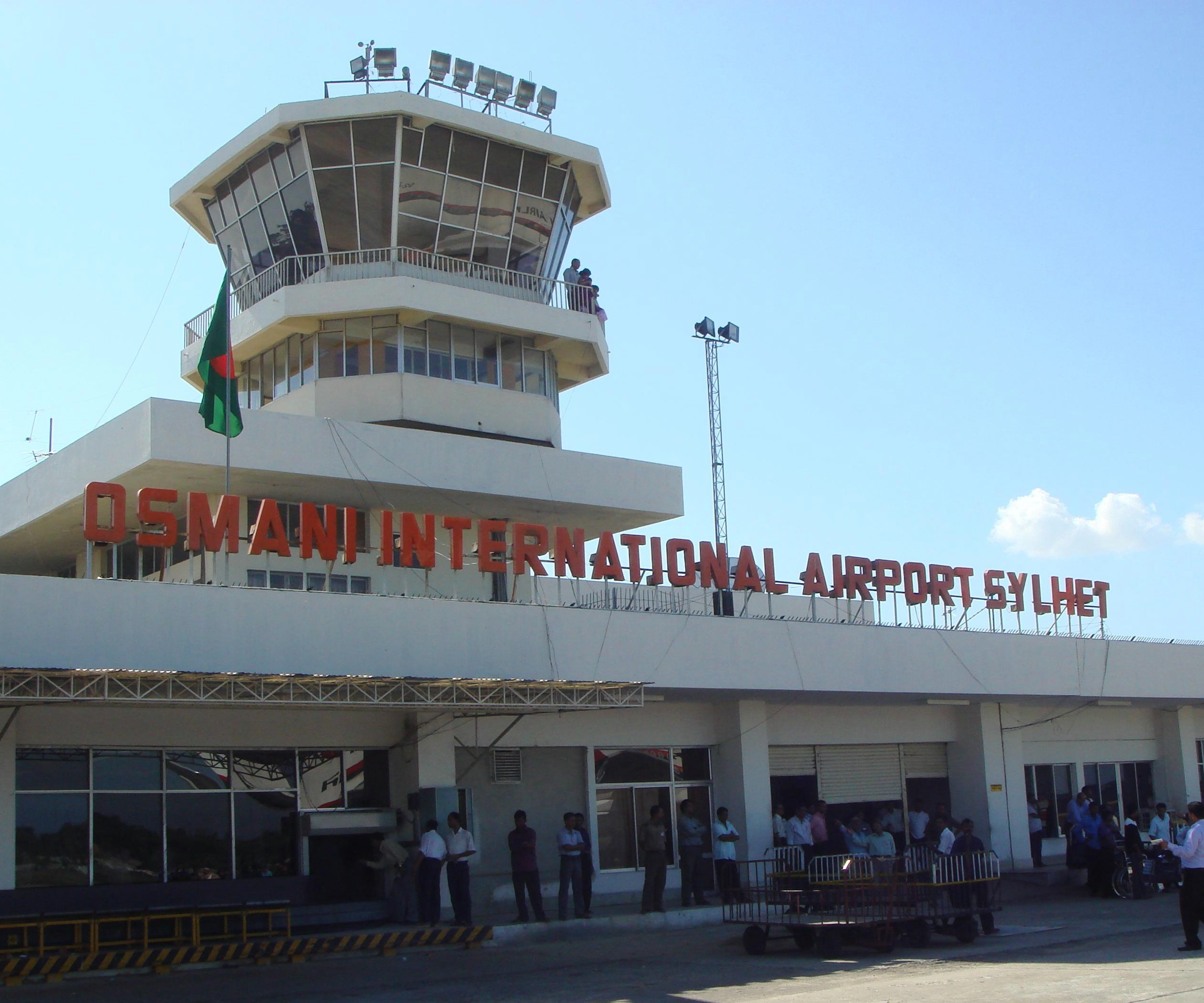
The airport in Osmani's hometown, Sylhet, has been named in his honour.

Osmani, nicknamed bongobahadur (Braveman of Bengal), had a major role in organising the Bangladesh armed forces. The international airport in his hometown, Sylhet, was named Osmani Antorjatik Biman Bondor (Osmani International Airport) for him. MAG Osmani Medical College and the city's state-run hospital also commemorate him. Osmani Memorial Auditorium in Dhaka, Osmani Primary School is in the London Borough of Tower Hamlets. The Osmani Museum is in Sylhet. Osmani Hall (an auditorium) is also there in School of Infantry and Tactics (SI&T), a student residency hall named G. M. A. G. Osmani Hall in BUTEX, a student residency hall named Osmani Hall in MIST, a military training institution for officers and soldiers of Bangladesh Army.
