= Fuad Abdul-Aziz =

Bangladeshi football content creator and presenter

- Born: Osmaninagar Upazila, Sylhet District, Bangladesh
- Education: Sheffield Hallam University
- Occupations: Football content creator, presenter
- Years active: 2018–present
- Known for: ViperSport; covering Bangladesh national football team matches

Fuad Abdul-Aziz is a Bangladeshi football content creator and presenter. He is the founder of the football media platform ViperSport, which he launched in 2018. He has worked with international football media organisations including DAZN, BBC and 433. He is also known for covering matches involving the Bangladesh national football team.

== Early life and education ==
Abdul-Aziz was born in Osmaninagar Upazila, Sylhet District, Bangladesh. He moved to the United Kingdom during his childhood and grew up in London. He completed his studies at the Sheffield Hallam University.

== Career ==
=== ViperSport ===
Abdul-Aziz founded ViperSport in 2018, initially creating content about boxing before shifting his focus towards football during the COVID-19 pandemic. The platform produces football-related content for social media audiences.

=== Broadcasting and media ===
Abdul-Aziz collaborated with several sports media organisations, including BBC, Oh My Goal and DAZN. He also became associated with the international football media platform 433.

In April 2025, he was announced as one of 12 contestants in the BBC football-content creator competition Last Pundit Standing. The contestants were selected from more than 400 applicants. The programme was presented by Troy Deeney and James Lawrence Allcott.

In June 2025, Abdul-Aziz worked as a reporter for DAZN's coverage of the National League Promotion Final at Wembley Stadium. He was also part of the broadcaster's social media team during the season.

In 2026, he made his presenting debut with 433 at a football legends match featuring Ronaldinho and other former players in Sunderland. He also worked on 433's coverage of Manchester City's pre-season tour of Asia in collaboration with Etihad Airways.

=== Bangladesh football coverage ===
Abdul-Aziz is known for covering matches involving the Bangladesh national football team and documenting the team's supporters through his football content. His coverage has included the team's international matches in Bangladesh and abroad.

In November 2025, he travelled to Bangladesh to cover the national team's 2027 AFC Asian Cup qualification match against the India national team. Following Bangladesh's 1–0 victory, he reported that his coverage of the match had received more than eight million views across social media platforms.

He subsequently travelled to Singapore to cover Bangladesh's away fixture. He reported that his coverage received more than 10 million organic views and that approximately 6,000 Bangladeshi supporters attended the match.

In October 2026, he reported that his coverage of Bangladesh's international football campaign over the preceding 12 months had generated more than 39 million views. He also travelled to Indonesia to cover the FIFA ASEAN Cup, producing short-form and long-form content about the tournament.

=== 2026 Ballon d'Or ===
In October 2026, Abdul-Aziz presented DAZN's red-carpet pre-show at the 2026 Ballon d'Or ceremony in London. During the event, he interviewed football personalities including Harry Kane and Ronaldo Nazário, alongside other attendees and football journalist Fabrizio Romano.
