= Balaganj Union =

Coordinates: 24.7532°N 91.7817°E

Balaganj Union বালাগঞ্জ ইউনিয়ন
- Union Council
- Interactive map of Balaganj Union
- Country: Bangladesh
- Division: Sylhet Division
- District: Sylhet District
- Sub District: Balaganj Upazila

Government
  - Union Chairman: Muhammad Abdul Munim
- Time zone: UTC+6 (BST)
- Postal code: 3120

Balaganj Union (Bengali: বালাগঞ্জ ইউনিয়ন) is a Union Parishad under Balaganj Upazila of Sylhet District in the division of Sylhet, Bangladesh. It has an area of square kilometres and a population of 3. Muhammad Abdul Munim has been leading it since 2016. The chief police (dofadar) of the Union is Abdul Malik.

== Chairmen ==
List of chairmen
Number	Name	Term
01	Alhaj Aftab Uddin Ahmed	
02	Abdul Ghafur Khalisdar	
03	Alhaj Aftab Uddin Ahmed	
04	Naeem Uddin Ahmad	
05	Siddiq Ali	1984-04-05 - 1988-07-11
06	Mushtaqur Rahman Mofur	1988-07-12 - 1998-04-13
07	Kripesh Vaidya	1998-04-14 - 1998-06-30
08	Mushtaqur Rahman Mofur	1998-07-01 -2008-11-18
09	Anwar Uddin Ahmad	2008-12-01 - 2010-01-02
10	Abdul Hafiz Renu	2010-01-06 - 2011-08-09
11	Muhammad Abdul Matin	2011-08-10 - 2016-08-16
12	Muhammad Abdul Munim	2016-08-16–present

== Markets ==
Balaganj Bazar, Ilashpur Bazar, Bualjur Bazar, Khalibari Bazar.

== Villages ==
Tilock Chanpur, Mazlishpur, Dhaksin Mazlishpur, Adityapur, Gourinatpur, Rifatpur, Pir Pur, Chanpur, Jagatpur, Ilashpur, Noyapathon, Botpathon, Babrobpur, Hasampur, Ushanpur, Radhakuna, Siria, Rupia, Manan, Charshubia, Charharia, Charbutha, Rahmatpur, Khajipur, Khalibari, Madaripur, and Kasipur.

== Institutions ==
=== Colleges ===
Balaganj Degree College is here. It is going to get the opportunity to be a governmental college soon. It was established in 1993 at Balaganj Union.

=== High schools ===
There are four High Schools in Balaganj Union. Name of the high schools are:

1. Balaganj D N Model High School
2. Toyrun Nessa Girls High School
3. Bualjur Bazar High School
4. Kaliganj M Ilias Ali High School

Balaganj D N Model High School had established on 1 April 1946. Toyrun Nessa Girls High School had established in 1977, Bualjur Bazar High School had established on 1 January 1973 and Kaliganj M Ilias Ali High School had established in 2001 respectively.

== Madrashas ==
There is only a madrasah named Islamia Mohammadia Alim Madrasha. Founder: Mr. Abdul Hamid Mosru.
