= Abdul Majid (justice) =

British Indian judge

Sir Abdul Majid CIE
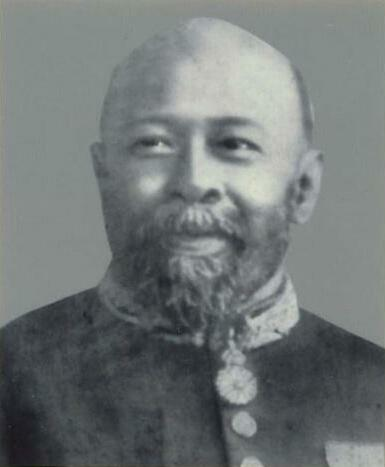
- Born: 17 May 1868; Jorhat, Assam, British India
- Died: 7 November 1924 (aged 56)
- Spouses: Mafidan Nissa
- Children: 7, including Mohammad Ishfaqul Mazid

Sir Abdul Majid CIE (17 May 1868 — 6 November 1924) was an Assam born Bengali justice and scholar of both the Bengali language and the Assamese language. He spoke Arabic, Persian, English, Bengali, and Assamese.

== Background and education ==
Majid's ancestors originated from Goalpara, Assam, but had moved to Jorhat in upper Assam when the ruling Ahom kings shifted their capital from Sivasagar to Jorhat. Majid's great-grandfather, Dar Shah Fakir, had renounced worldly life and became an ascetic. Majid's grandfather, Mohammad Shah, became a merchant and the largest Mauzadar of Assam, who owned large arable land and residential properties.

Majid was born on 17 May 1868 in Balibat, Jorhat in the then North-East Frontier, British India. In 1882, at age 14, he became the first graduate from Jorhat to pass the entrance examination from Jorhat High School. He then graduated from Presidency College in Calcutta in 1887. He then enrolled into Cambridge University to study law in 1888. In 1891, he qualified as a barrister from Middle Temple.

== Career ==
In 1920, Majid became a justice of the Calcutta High Court. He was awarded CIE (Companion of Indian Empire) at ceremony in London attended by King George V.

Majid was a litterateur of the Assamese language.

== Personal life ==
Majid married Mafidan Nissa in Assam. She was a daughter of Munshi Rahmat Ali, a Magistrate from Puranigudam, Nagaon district.

They had four sons and three daughters. His eldest son, Inamul Majid, served as High Commissioner of Andaman and Nicobar Islands. His third son, Mohammad Ishfaqul Mazid, went on to become the first East Pakistani general in the Pakistan Army. His youngest son, Safkat Majid, was a director of agriculture in Assam Government. His second daughter, Zubaida Ataur Rahman, a social worker, was awarded the Kaisar-i-Hind Medal and she was the 1st woman president of Assam Legislative Council. His youngest daughter, Mafida Majid, was the first Assamese Muslim woman graduate from Calcutta University.

Majid had a brother, Abu Sahid Shah.
