= Shah Siddiq =

14th-century Sufi figure

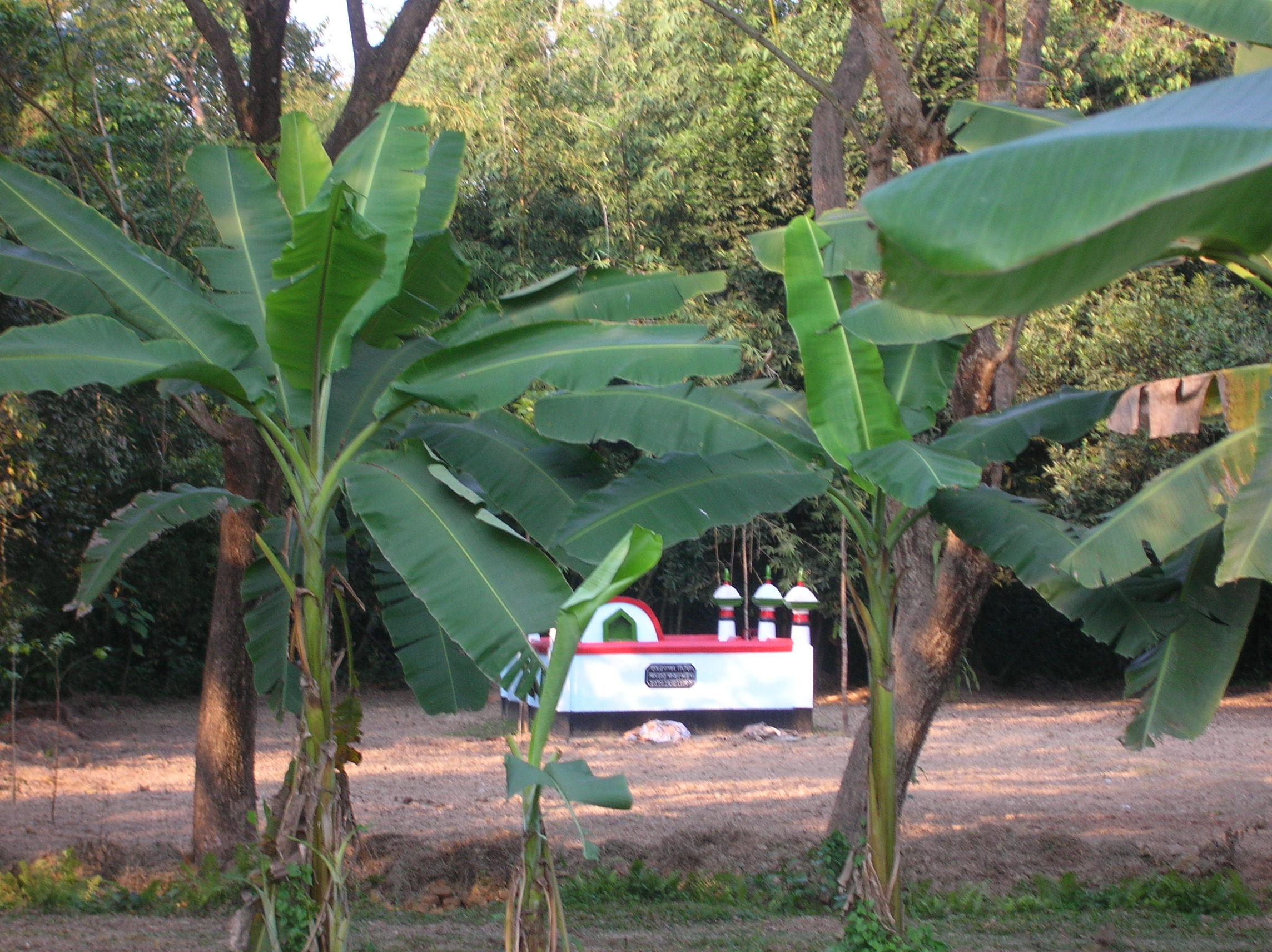
- Shah Siddiq's tomb in Osmani Nagar

Personal life
- Born: Middle East
- Died: Panchpara, Osmani Nagar, Sylhet District, Bangladesh
- Resting place: Panchpara, Ward 3, Osmanpur Union, Osmani Nagar
- Other names: Shah Siddiqi, Shah Siddik
- Relatives: Abu Bakr (ancestor)

Religious life
- Religion: Sunni Islam
- Lineage: Abu Bakr

Senior posting
- Based in: Osmani Nagar, Sylhet District, Bangladesh
- Post: Religious figure
- Period in office: Early 14th century

Shah Siddiq (Arabic: شاه صديق, Bengali: শাহ সিদ্দিক) was a 14th-century Sufi saint and one of the 360 auliyas or followers who accompanied Shah Jalal in his Conquest of Sylhet from Turkey. He traced his descent from Abu Bakr Siddiq, the first caliph of Islam. Descendants of Shah Siddiq from Panchpara, Osmanpur Union, Osmani Nagar Upazila (in Bangladesh) carry the surname Siddiquee.

He lies buried in the Panchpara village in Sylhet District, at roughly 24°43'09.7"N 91°46'31.1"E. The Panchpara Shah Siddique (R) Jamea Islamia High School is named after him. His exact date of death remains unknown, however a plaque on his tomb claims that it could be the 21st of August, 1373 A.D.

Older images of his tomb can be found in this website.

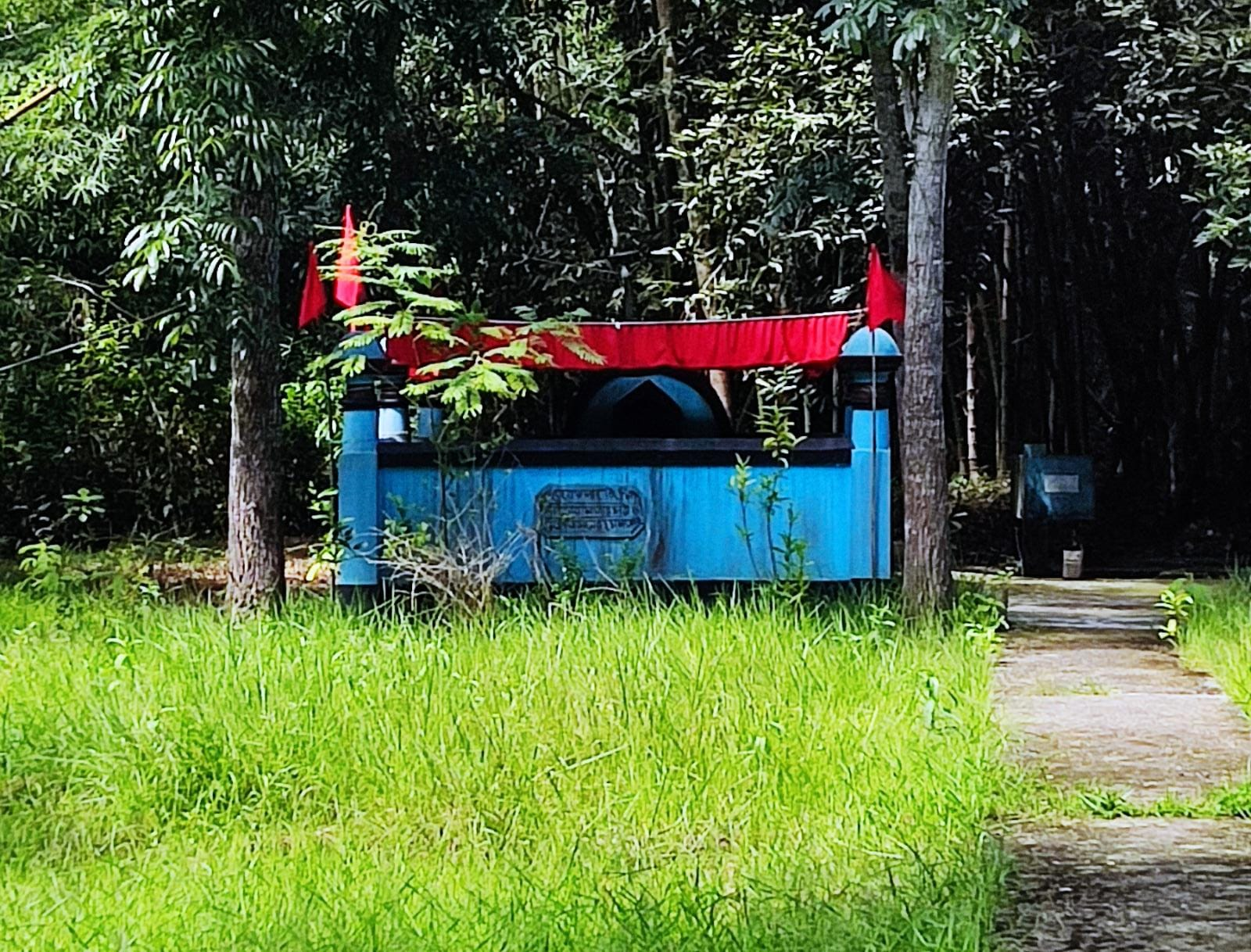
A photograph of Shah Siddiq's tomb in August 2022.
