= Shah Gabru =

Personal life
- Born: Afghanistan
- Died: Gabhurteki, Sylhet
- Resting place: Panch Pir Maqam, Gabhurteki, Sadipur Union, Osmani Nagar
- Children: Muhammad Ghazi
- Other name: Shaikh Gharib Khan Nisthani Afghani

Religious life
- Religion: Islam

Senior posting
- Based in: Gabhurteki
- Post: Companion of Shah Jalal
- Period in office: Early 14th century

Shaykh Gharib Khan Nistani Afghani (Bengali: শেখ গরীব খাঁন নিস্থানি আফগানী, Arabic: شيخ غريب افغاني), popularly known as Shāh Gabru (Bengali: শাহ গাবরু), was a 14th-century Sufi Muslim figure from the Sylhet region. Gabru's name is associated with the propagation of Islam in Osmani Nagar. In 1303, he joined Shah Jalal in the Conquest of Sylhet.

== Life ==
Gabru was born in Afghanistan in the 13th century. Shah Gabru met Shah Jalal during his meeting with Nizamuddin Auliya and decided to accompany him in his expedition towards the Indian subcontinent. In 1303, he took part in the final battle of the Conquest of Sylhet under Shah Jalal's leadership against Raja Gour Govinda.

Following the victory, Shah Jalal ordered a small number of his companions to migrate to what is now known as Osmani Nagar. Gabru is noted to be a part of a collective known as the Panch Pir (পাঁচপীর; five saints). He set up a hujra south of Banaiya Haor in a Hindu village. Many Hindu families embraced Islam due to his efforts and Gabru eventually married into one of the families. The elders of the family lovingly called him "Gabru" (meaning popular person or son-in-law) following the marriage; which led to him being more popularly known as Shah Gabru. The village was named after him as Gabhurteki.

== Legacy and descendants ==
আমল ছাড়া আলিম
Amol chhara aalim
মহাপাপী জালিম
Mohapapi zaalim
নিম্নগার জল যথা নিম্ন দিকে যায়
Nimnogar jol jotha nimno dike jaay
বিনয়ীর কাছে গুন সেইরূপ ধায়
Binoyir kachhe gun sheiroop dhaay
ভগ্ন তরী ভাসাইলে মগ্ন হয় জলে
Bhogno tori bhashaile mogno hoy jole
না বুঝি করিলে কাজ বিঘ্ন হয় ফলে
Na bujhi korile kaaj bighno hoy phole

— A poem by Karmabir Dr. Murtaza Chowdhury.

It is unclear how and what year he died, but he is buried in a mazar in Gabhurteki next to the four other pirs. It is now known as the Maqam of the Panch Pir. His descendants can also be found in the nearby areas and were a very notable zamindar family. His son was Muhammad Ghazi and his grandson was Muhammad Sulayman. Sulayman's son was Muhammad Adam, and his son was Muhammad Mahtab ad-Din. Mahtab's son was Muhammad Hilal ad-Din and Mahtab's grandson was Muhammad Rafiq ad-Din. Rafiq's son was Muhammad Sami who was presented the title of Chowdhury. His son was Muhammad Sabdar Husayn Chowdhury, who had five sons: Nadir, Sadir, Haydar, Ghulam and Hatim.

Nadir had a son called Amin ad-Din Chowdhury who in turn had three sons; Ahmad ad-Din Chowdhury, Moulvi Kafil ad-Din Chowdhury and Moulvi Khalil ad-Din Chowdhury. Sadir had two sons; Moulvi Ahmad Latif Chowdhury and Moulvi Ahmad Razzaq Chowdhury. Latif's two sons were Shafiq and Rafiq. Razzaq's three sons were Abd al-Khaliq, Abd al-Malik and Abd al-Salik.

Haydar had two sons; Shams al-Hasan Chowdhury and Badr al-Hasan Chowdhury. Shams had a son called Nur al-Hasan Chowdhury.

Ghulam Husayn Chowdhury was the ustad of the Mazumdar family and later the wakil of Sylhet District Judge Court. Ghulam Husayn's son was Mufti Abdur Rahman Chowdhury, who married Husne Ara Banu. They had five children; Mawlana Mustafa Chowdhury, Moulvi Mujtaba Chowdhury, Lutf an-Nisa, Ashraf an-Nisa and Karmabir Dr. Murtaza Chowdhury. Mustafa was a prominent Persian language poet. Mustafa has a great-grandson, Sharif Chowdhury, who is also the 15th generation descendant of Shah Gharib Khan Nisthani. Lutf an-Nisa married Mawlana Jalal ad-Din Chowdhury of Karimganj. Ashraf an-Nisa married Mawlana Siraj al-Haq Chowdhury of Ranaping, Golapganj.

Murtaza Chowdhury was born in Gabhurteki on 29 December 1896. He studied Arabic, Bengali and Urdu at a young age before enrolling at the Murari Chand College. He then studied at the Calcutta Homoeopathic Medical College & Hospital. He had connections with the Jamiat Ulema-e-Hind, and is often considered to be instrumental to the development of the Qawmi Madrasah system in Bengal having established the Azad Dini Adarah and Sylhet Qaumi Madrasah Board himself. Hussain Ahmad Madani was a close associate of his and the scholar mentioned Murtaza and his efforts in his books and speeches as well. Murtaza is also noted for persuading the British Raj to allow the Islamic call to prayer to be announced in Sylhet Central Prison. Murtaza had one son by the name of Shaykh Jubayr Ahmad Chowdhury Kamal. Jubayr was an author and one of his well-known works is the biography of his father's life and services. He had two sons; Rashid Ahmad Chowdhury Lubab and Mawlana Saeed Ahmad Chowdhury Subab.

Hatim Husayn Chowdhury was a renowned alim. Hatim married a woman from the Mirza family of Calcutta. He later built a mosque in Colootola in Kolkata where he became a teacher and mutawalli, permanently residing in the city. His children were Aisha Khatun and Khan Bahadur Hamid Chowdhury. Hamid was the city magistrate of Patna and later the Bihar divisional commissioner. He then became the chairman of the service commission.
