= Dayamir Union =

Urban council of Sylhet District, Bangladesh

Coordinates: 24.7532°N 91.7817°E

Dayamir Union (Bengali: দয়ামীর ইউনিয়ন) is a union council under Osmani Nagar Upazila of Sylhet District, Bangladesh. It is the native home of General M. A. G. Osmani, who was the supreme commander of the Bangladesh Liberation War. Student Leader Amran.

== Villages ==
- Khagdior
- Dawlatpur
- Raghavpur
- Kauwarai
- Khalpar
- Khapon
- Kharai
- Raikdara
- Muhammadpur
- Chintamoni
- Chonditiyor
- Ahmadnagar
- Keshorpur
- Dhakur Mahal
- Ataullah
- Khatupur
- Nij Korua
- Chuto Dhirarai
- Dayamir
- Ranagalpur
- Mirpara
- Shonir Gaon
- Gush Gaon
- Hussain Namki
- Shorishpur
- Shonyashi Para
- Mirdar Chowk
- Tazpur
- Radhakona
- Kaiyakair
- Shirazpur
- Kabari Para
- Aalapur
- Parkul
- Suwar Gaon
- Khandakar Bazar
- Mirar Gaon
- Khairpur
- Boro Dhirarai
- Alampur
- Khanchanpur
- Chock Ataullah
- Chock Mandalkapon
- Paschim Mandalkapon
- Ashrafpur
