= Mohammad Ishfaqul Mazid =

Bengali army general

Major General Mohammad Ishfaqul Mazid
- মুহাম্মদ ইশফাকুল মজিদ
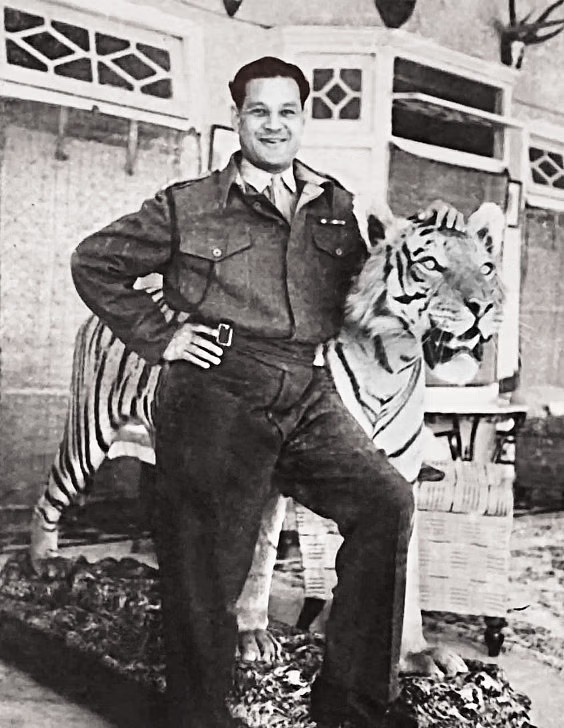
- Majid in his family home in Shillong, Assam (1942)
- Born: 17 March 1903; Jorhat, Assam, British India
- Died: 31 March 1976 (aged 73); Combined Military Hospital (Dhaka), Bangladesh
- Alma mater: Cotton College, Guwahati; Royal Military College, Sandhurst
- Military career
- Branch: British Indian Army (1924–1947); Pakistan Army (1947–1951)
- Service years: 1924-1951
- Rank: Major General
- Unit: Royal Lincolnshire Regiment
- Commands: 9th Infantry Division; 335th Infantry Brigade
- Conflicts: World War II; Burma campaign; Malayan campaign; Indo-Pakistani War of 1947-1948

Muhammed Ishfakul Majid (17 March 1903 — 31 March 1976) was the first Bengali general in the Pakistan Army and the senior most Pakistani Bengali officer at the time of the Partition of India.

== Early life and education ==
Majid was born on 17 March 1903 in Jorhat, Assam, British India, to Abdul Majid, the first Muslim who served as a justice in the Bengal High Court. He completed his undergraduate degree at Cotton College, Guwahati. On 2 February 1922, he joined the Royal Military College, Sandhurst. He was the first graduate from Sandhurst in modern Bangladesh.

== Military career ==
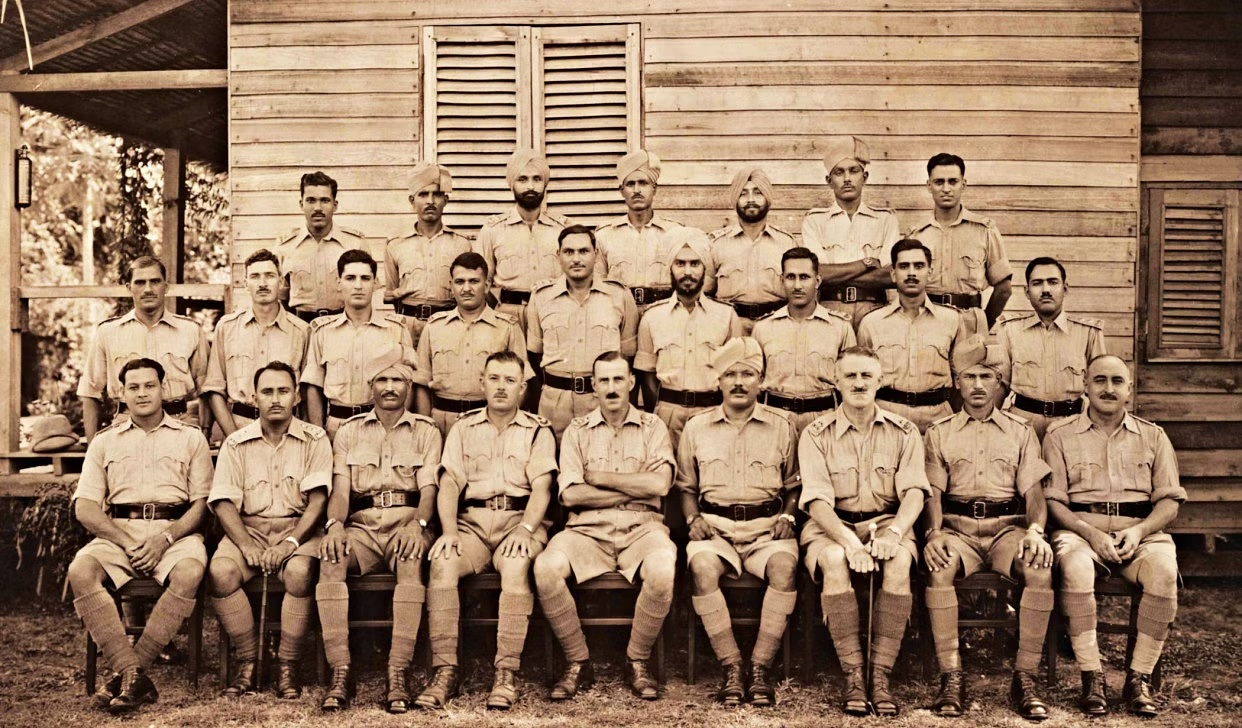
Majid with British and Indian army officers (1934)

Majid joined the Royal Military College, Sandhurst, on 2 February 1922. He was commissioned on 27 August 1924 on the unattached list for the Indian Army. After his commission, he was attached to the second battalion of the Lincolnshire Regiment of the British Army for a year. On 31 October 1925, he was accepted for the British Indian Army, being posted to the 4th Battalion 19th Hyderabad Regiment. He was promoted to lieutenant on 27 November 1926, captain on 27 August 1933, and major on 1 December 1941. He served in Burma and British Malaya during the Second World War, attached to the Assam Regiment.

In 1947, Majid joined the Pakistan Army. In the Pakistan Army, he was promoted to the rank of major general. He became the GOC of the 9th Infantry Division of the Pakistan Army. Majid was senior in rank to Ayub Khan, but Ayub Khan became the Commander-in-Chief of the Pakistan Army, bypassing him, due to the lobbying of Iskander Mirza. Majid was named in the Rawalpindi conspiracy, but he was later proved innocent.

Majid returned to East Pakistan in 1962.

== Bangladesh Liberation War ==
He and Colonel M. A. G. Osmani met Sheikh Mujibur Rahman in March 1971 on behalf of retired Bengali soldiers and showed their loyalty towards an independent Bangladesh. Majid was later arrested in July 1971. The army authorities intensely pressured him to give a statement against Sheikh Mujib denouncing him as a traitor, which he steadfastly refused to comply with. He was later sent to Dhaka Central Jail, where he was held in isolation and finally released in August 1971.

== Personal life ==
Majid married three times. In 1935, Majid married Ayesha Rahim, the youngest daughter of Justice Sir Abdur Rahim of Midnapore, Bengal. Ayesha's eldest sister Niaz Fatima was married to Huseyn Shaheed Suhrawardy. After Ayesha's death in 1941, Majid married Zohra Raza, the sister-in-law of Raja Syed Mohammad Sa'adat Ali Khan of Nanpara State in Bahraich (now in Uttar Pradesh). The marriage ended in a divorce in the late 1950s. After moving to East Pakistan, he married Begum Marium Ladli in 1961. The couple adopted a daughter.

== Death ==
Majid died on 31 March 1976 in Combined Military Hospital, Dhaka. He was buried at Azimpur Graveyard with full military honours.

== Sources ==
- London Gazette (various dates)
- Indian Army List (various dates)
- The History Of The Assam Regiment Vol-I (Captain Peter Steyn)
