= Goula Bazar Union =

Coordinates: 24.706°N 91.733°E

Goala Bazar Union (Bengali: গোয়ালাবাজার) is a union parishad of Osmani Nagar Upazila of Sylhet District in Sylhet Division, Bangladesh, comprising several villages around Goala Bazar.Hamendra Kumar Sen is the founder chairman of this union parishad.

Goalabazar Union is a union in Osmaninagar Upazila of Sylhet District, Bangladesh.

== Geographical Data ==
Goala Bazar Union has an area of 4563 acres (square kilometers). 2803 families live in this union.

History Goala Bazar Union The ancient settlement of Goala Bazar Union was established on the two banks of the Barak River in the area since 1176 AD.[2] A Muslim settlement was established in Sylhet before and during the arrival of Hazrat Shah Jalal (RA). Several shrines of the companions and followers of Hazrat Shah Jalal (RA) exist here. The Goala Bazar Model Union Parishad is located in the middle of 48 villages.

It is known that the landlords of the local Daspara area had several cowsheds in the present Goala Bazar Hat area. Once upon a time, one or two shops were built near those cowsheds. Over time, it came to be known as Goala Bazar. Located on the Sylhet-Dhaka highway, Goala Bazar is an ancient and renowned business center. There are several schools, madrasas, a government women's college, a public library, Upazila Health Complex Hospital and the Osmaninagar Upazila Press Club's own building. Former president of Balaganj Press Club Gias Uddin Ahmed (author of the book 'Balaganj History and Heritage'), former president of Osmaninagar Press Club Ujjal Dhar (author of the book 'Balaganje mukhtijuddho'), former secretary of Osmaninagar Press Club Anwar Hossain, journalist Jubel Ahmed, journalist Abdul Matin, journalist Koyesh Mia are residents of this union. People of both Hindu and Muslim communities have been mixing with each other here for a long time. Goala Bazar is called the commercial capital of Osmaninagar.

Villages and Mouzas There are 48 villages and 11 mouzas in this union. Notable villages are Brahmangram, Dattagram, Nijkarnasi, Nagarikapon, Eolatail, Ekarai, Daspara, Bhudarpur, Ilashpur, Kachburai, Terhati, Bhagalpur, Motiyar Gao.

Language and Culture Sylhet has historically maintained and nurtured a distinct language and culture.[3] Goala Bazar Union is a part of Sylhet. Different communities live here, which also results in diversity in terms of language. As Sylhet was formerly part of the state of Assam, the influence of Assam can be seen in the language and culture of Sylhet. Sylhet also has its own diverse alphabet, the Nagri alphabet.[3]

Administrative Structure The Goala Bazar Union is made up of 9 wards and 48 mohallas. In these 9 wards, 9 ward councilors are elected for general seats and 3 women councilors are elected for reserved seats. The Honorable Mayor and Honorable Councilors are elected by direct vote of the people.
