= Umarpur Union =

Umarpur Union উমরপুর ইউনিয়ন
- Union Council
- No. 1 Umarpur Union Council
- Location in Bangladesh
- Country: Bangladesh
- Division: Sylhet Division
- District: Sylhet District
- Upazila: Osmani Nagar Upazila

Government
  - Union Parishad Chairman: Muhammad Faruq Ahmad

Population
  - Total: 21,026
- Demonym: Umarpuri
- Time zone: UTC+6 (BST)
- Postal code: 3126
- Website: umorpurup.sylhet.gov.bd

Umarpur (Bengali: উমরপুর, romanized: Umorpur) is a union parishad under Osmani Nagar Upazila of Sylhet District in the division of Sylhet, Bangladesh. It has a total area of 12 square kilometres and a population of 58,679.

== History ==
Following the Conquest of Sylhet in 1303, one of Shah Jalal's disciples, Shah Jalaluddin, migrated to modern-day Umarpur Union. Jalaluddin settled in Khujgipur where he cured the disabled daughter of a local Brahmin and later married her. His tomb is present in a mazar (mausoleum) in Khujgipur and his descendants continue to inhabit the village. In addition to Jalaluddin, another Sufi pir by the name of Syed Kamaluddin Ahmad settled in the village of Bara Isabpur. He is also known as Shah Damri or Damri Pir because he had left his hometown of Patna with only one damri. Shah Damri married the daughter of Shaykh Kalu, a disciple of Shah Jalal that settled in Pirergaon, Jagannathpur. He also had two brothers, Syed Shah Subhanuddin and Syed Shah Badr Alam. Subhanuddin is buried in Isabpur where his descendants live whilst Badr Alam remained in Pirergaon. They are also related to Syed Shah Husayn Alam, author of Bhedsar. Also, Umarpur Union was the home of Shah Mullah Mubarak after whom the village of Mollapara is named after. His mazar is also situated in Mollapara. The mazar of Shaykh Yunus Shah can be found in eastern Khadimpur.

During the Bangladesh Liberation War of 1971, five prominent freedom fighters which fought were: Muhammad Moyna Miah, Muhammad Afsar Miah, Muhammad Shonafor Ali, Muhammad Rafiq Ali and Muhammad Mufassil Ali.

Umarpur Union council building was established in 2007–2008.

== Demography ==
Umarpur has a population of 21,026 out of which 9,920 are men and 11,106 are women.

== Administration ==
- Ward 1: Lama Hijolshah, Hizolshah, Umarpur, Umarpur Bazaar, Shahzhanpur, Bade Khujgipur, Mathiya Khara, Adityapur, Kamalpur, Shivpur
- Ward 2: Niz Mandaruka, Tajpur, East Mandaruka, Paragalpur, Majidpur
- Ward 3: Dilalpur, Itachhoki, Chouddo Kiyar, Kaliya, Ekanidha, Khadimpur
- Ward 4: Saidpur, Madhabpur, Majlispur
- Ward 5: Kotalpur, Habshpur, Chebar Para, Bongram, Mullah Para, Tahirpur
- Ward 6: Abdullahpur, Marupara, Poshchimgaon, Maijgaon, Bhoraut, Purbogaon, Rangbaran, Hamtonpur
- Ward 7: Lama Ishobpur, Khujgipur
- Ward 8: Boro Ishobpur
- Ward 9: Matihani, Housepur

=== Chairmen ===
List of chairmen
Name	Term	Notes
Muhammad Afsar Ali Chowdhury	1961 - 1966	
Muhammad Rafizur Rahman Chowdhury	1966 - 1971	
Muhammad Amin Uddin	1971 - 1977	Relief Chairman
Muhammad Sirajul Islam Sona Mian	1977 - 1984	
Muhammad Abdal Mian	1984 - 1990	
Mafassil Ali Mashuq Mian	1990 - 1993	
Muhammad Abdal Mian	1993 - 17/4/2003	
Muhammad Chiragh Ali	17/4/2003 - 8/8/2011	
Muhammad Faruq Ahmad	8/8/2011–2016	
Gulam Kibria	2016–present	

== Economy and tourism ==
Umarpur has a significant number of British immigrants contributing to its economy. It has two haat bazaars and they are Umarpur Bazaar and Khadimpur New Market Bazar. It has three canals; Khadimpur Meledari Canal, Habshpur-Kotalpur Kashtgang Canal and Sikandarpur Canal. The mazars of Shah Jalaluddin (Khujgipur) and Shah Damri (Boro Ishobpur) are popular tourist sites.

== Education ==
There are eight madrasas namely; Kotalpur Darul Qiraat Hafizia Madrasa, Umarpur Bazar Anwarul Uloom Title Madrasa, Madinatul Uloom Women's Madrasa, Khadimpur Katal Khair Hafizia Dakhil Madrasa, Osmani Nagar Islamic Academy, Khadimpur Women's Qaumi Madrasa, Lama Ishobpur Ahmadiya Hafizia Madrasa and Shah Sikandar Hafizia Dakhil Madrasa.

== Facilities ==
The Union contains 53 mosques:

- Syed Mandaruk Jame Masjid, Syed Mandaruka Kazirbazar Jame Masjid
- Nij Mandaruka Jame Masjid, Nij Mandaruka New Jame Masjid, East Mandaruka Jame Masjid, East Mandaruka New Jame Masjid
- Kotalpur East Jame Masjid, Kotalpur West Jame Masjid
- Habshpur Jame Masjid
- Mullah Para Jame Masjid
- Tahirpur Jame Masjid
- Umarpur Jame Masjid, Bayt an-Najat Jame Masjid, Umarpur Bazar Jame Masjid, Anwarul Uloom Masjid
- Kamalpur Jame Masjid
- Hijolshah Jame Masjid
- Shibpur Jame Masjid
- Shahzhanpur Jame Masjid
- Matiya Kara Jame Masjid
- Khadimpur West Jame Masjid, Khadimpur East Jame Masjid, Khadimpur North Jame Masjid, New Market Jame Masjid
- Madhavpur Jame Masjid
- Mirza Shahidpur Jame Masjid, North Shahidpur Jame Masjid
- Noagaon Jame Masjid
- Majlispur Jame Masjid, Khamsopa Jame Masjid
- Lama Ishobpur Jame Masjid, Bayt as-Salam North Boro Ishobpur Jame Masjid, Bayt an-Nur East Boro Ishobpur Jame Masjid, Central Boro Ishobpur Jame Masjid, South Boro Ishobpur Jame Masjid
- Khuzgipur Man Ullah High School Jame Masjid, Khuzgipur Jame Masjid
- Paragalpur Majidpur Jame Masjid
- East Matihani Jame Masjid, South Matihani Jame Masjid, West Matihani Jame Masjid
- Housepur Jame Masjid
- Poshchimgaon Jame Masjid, Poshchimgaon Eidgah Jame Masjid
- West Bagicha Jame Masjid
- Maijgaon Jame Masjid
- Rongboron Jame Masjid, East Rangboron Jame Masjid
- Purbagaon Jame Masjid
- Hashmatpur Jame Masjid
- East Abdullahpur Jame Masjid, West Abdullahpur Jame Masjid
- Syed Kamaluddin Shah Damri Masjid
