= Osmani Nagar Upazila =

Coordinates: 24.7151°N 91.7456°E

Osmani Nagar ওসমানী নগর
- Upazila
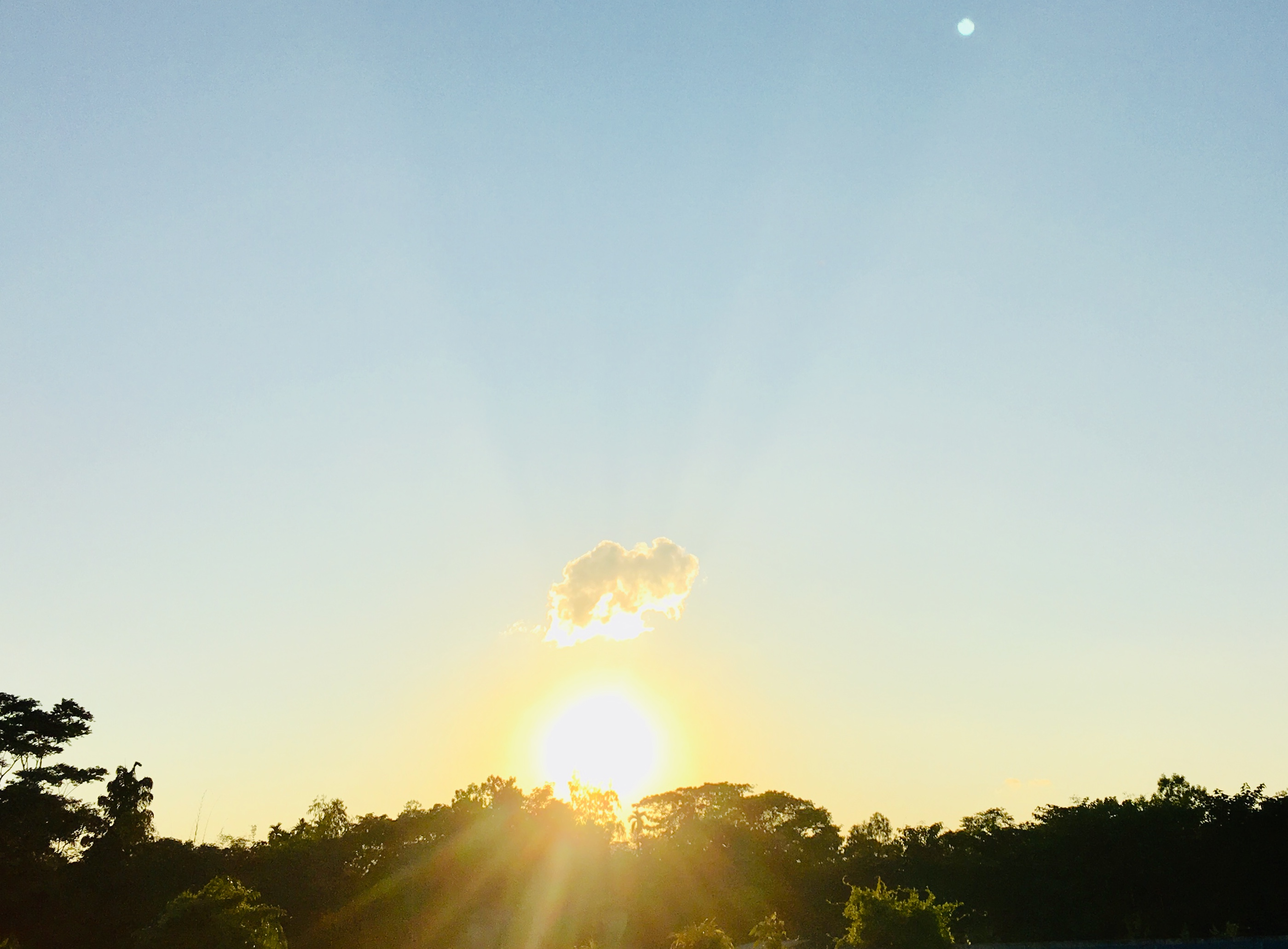
- Sunset over the countryside of Osmani Nagar Upazila

- Country: Bangladesh
- Division: Sylhet
- District: Sylhet

Government
  - Upazila Chairman: Vacant

Area
  - Total: 224.54 km^{2} (86.70 sq mi)

Population (2022)
  - Total: 216,412
  - Density: 963.80/km^{2} (2,496.2/sq mi)
- Demonym(s): Osmani Nagari, Usmaninogori
- Time zone: UTC+6 (BST)
- Postal code: 3123 (Tajpur) 3124 (Goala Bazar) 3126 (Omarpur)
- Website: www.osmaninagar.sylhet.gov.bd

Osmani Nagar (Bengali: ওসমানী নগর) is an upazila of Sylhet District in the Division of Sylhet, Bangladesh.

Osmani Nagar Upazila is located in the north of Sylhet district on the banks of the Kushiyara River. This upazila is bounded by Sylhet Sadar Upazila to the north, Moulvibazar Sadar Upazila to the south, Balaganj Upazila and South Surma Upazila to the east, Bishwanath Upazila and Jagannathpur Upazila to the west. It was historically the part of Balaganj Upazila.

== Establishment ==
The formal activities of Osmani Nagar Upazila were started on 13 June 2015. The area of this upazila is 224.54 square kilometers. The first Upazila Executive Officer of Osmani Nagar Upazila is Mohammad Shawkat Ali. He joined the upazila as the first Upazila Executive Officer on 13 July 2015.

== History ==
Osmani Nagar was previously part of historic Aurangapur Pargana. Following the Conquest of Sylhet in 1303, Shah Jalal instructed his disciples to spread out and propagate Islam. Five pirs, among whom Shah Gabru is most well-known, set up a hujra south of Banaiya Haor in a Hindu village. Many Hindu families embraced Islam due to their efforts and Gabru eventually married into one of the families and the village was named after him as Gabhurteki. Other disciples of Shah Jalal that contributed to the spread of Islam in present-day Osmani Nagar include Nizamuddin Osmani in Dayamir, Shah Sulayman Karani Qurayshi in Karanshi and Shah Jalaluddin in Khushkipur (Korua). The tombs of Shah Siddiq, Shah Garib and Usman Baghdadi can be found in Osmanpur Union. Similarly, Shah Mustafa also passed by the village of Tilapara (in Mukhtarpur, Burunga Union) with a group of Muslims on the way to Chandrapur (modern-day Moulvibazar). They rested under a large tree near a pond situated in the home of a Hindu family of Brahmins (priests). It was customary for this family to give offerings under the tree everyday for their Devata's satisfaction. According to tradition, the priest and his wife had dreamed of the Devata going away and when the family refused to let it go, they said the truth has come, we have no right to stay. Waking up from the dream, they went towards the tree and saw three respectful men. The Brahmin priest had a friendly discussion with them, and accepted Islam. The news of his conversion spread across the area and many more people converted to Islam on that day. On the evening of Mustafa's departure, he entrusted the new converts to one of his murids (disciples).

Shah Tajuddin, a companion of Shah Kamal Quhafah, migrated to village of Gauharpur after arriving in Sylhet in 1315 CE.

Osmani Nagar thana was established with eight Union Parishads of Balaganj on 23 March 2001. On 2 June 2014, the thana was turned into an upazila.

Osmani Nagar is famous for providing fierce fighters during the Bangladesh Liberation War, 1971, with General Osmani being a notable figure.

First Upazilla Nirbhahi Officer: First Upazilla Nirbhahi Officer was Mr. Mohammad Showkat Ali. He joined at Osmaninagar Upazilla as the first Upazilla Nirbhahi Officer on 13 July 2015.

== Geography ==
Osmani Nagar Upazila has a total area of 224.54 square kilometres (86.70 sq mi). It borders Bishwanath and Dakshin Surma upazilas to the north, Balaganj Upazila to the east and south, and Nabiganj and Jagannathpur upazilas of Habiganj District and Sunamganj District respectively, to the west.

== Demographics ==
Religions in Osmani Nagar Upazila (2022)
Religion	Percent
Islam	91.95%
Hinduism	8.03%
Other or not stated	0.02%

According to the 2022 Bangladeshi census, Osmaninagar Upazila had 40,540 households and a population of 216,412. 8.79% of the population were under 5 years of age. Osmaninagar had a literacy rate (age 7 and over) of 76.74%: 78.35% for males and 75.20% for females, and a sex ratio of 96.95 males for every 100 females. 5,702 (2.63%) lived in urban areas.

According to the 2011 Census of Bangladesh, the eight unions which make up Osmani Nagar Upazila had 34,286 households and a population of 201,354. 50,441 (25.05%) were under 10 years of age. Osmani Nagar had a literacy rate (age 7 and over) of 50.31%, compared to the national average of 51.8%, and a sex ratio of 1013 females per 1000 males. The entire population lived in rural areas.

== Administration ==
Osmani Nagar Upazila is divided into eight union parishads: Burungabazar, Dayamir, Goula Bazar, Osmanpur, Sadipur, Tajpur, Umarpur, and West Poilanpur. The entire administrative activities of the upazila are under the jurisdiction of Osmani Nagar Police Station. The union parishads are subdivided into 129 mauzas and 295 villages.

== Education ==
- Tajpur Degree College
- Goala Bazar Adarsha Mahila College
- Dayamir Degree College
- Osmaninagar Islamic Academy
- Mangal Chandi Nishi Kanta Govt. High School.(M.C.N.K)
- Burunga Iqbal Ahmed High School & College

== Notable people ==
- Mufleh R. Osmany, former Foreign Secretary and diplomat
- Muhammad Ashraf Ali, former member of parliament
- Muhammad Ataul Gani Osmani, commander-in-chief of Mukti Bahini
- Shah Azizur Rahman, politician
- Shah Gabru, early disciple of Shah Jalal who took part in the 14th-century Conquest of Sylhet
- Ujjal Dhar, former President, Osmaninagar upozila Pressclub, Author of the book `Balagonje Muktijuddho'

== See also ==
- Upazilas of Bangladesh
- Districts of Bangladesh
- Divisions of Bangladesh
