= Balaganj Upazila =

Balaganj বালাগঞ্জ
- Upazila
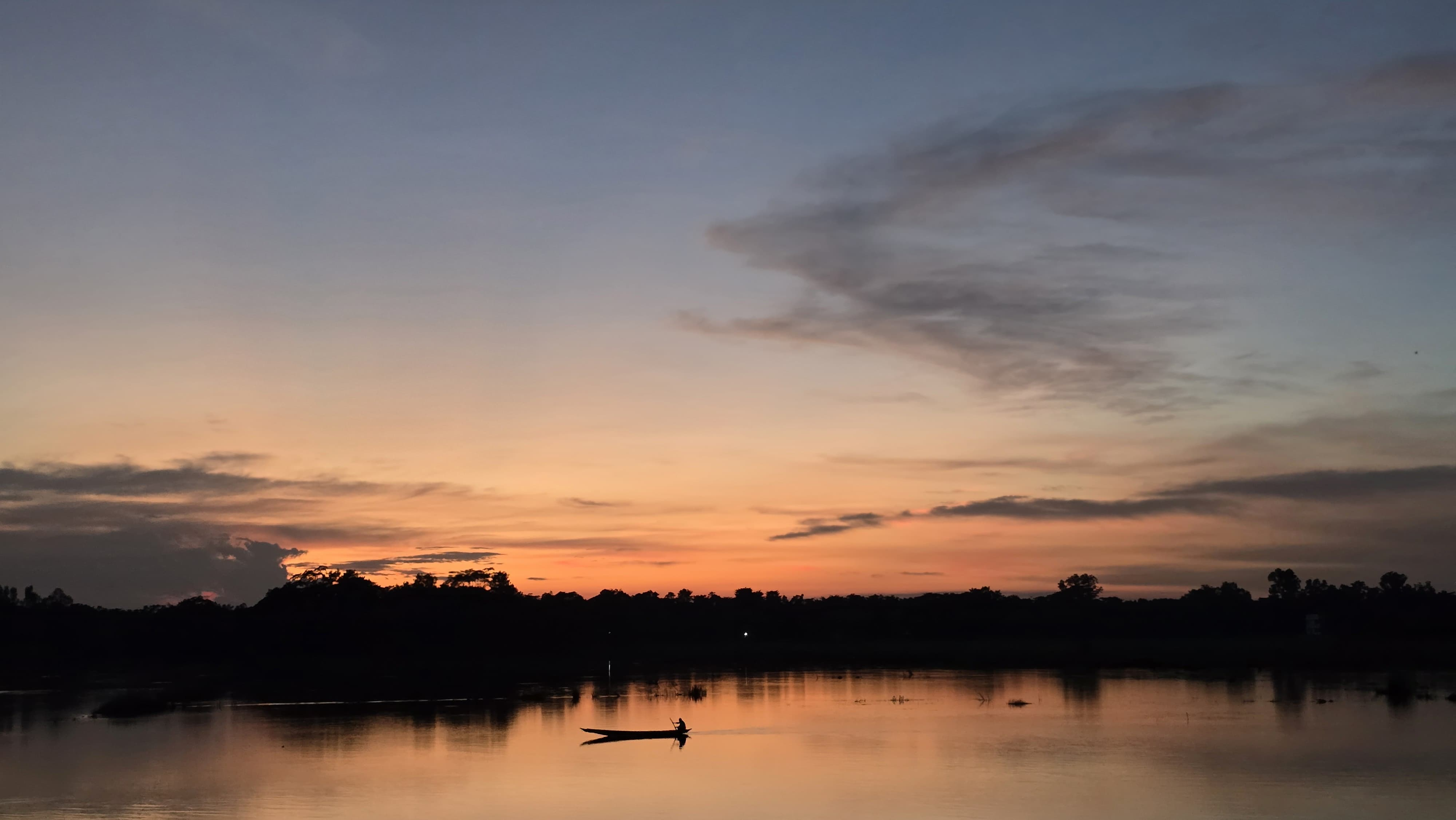
- Sunset in Balaganj

- Country: Bangladesh
- Division: Sylhet
- District: Sylhet

Government
  - MP (Sylhet-2): Vacant (ad-interim)

Area
  - Total: 151.21 km^{2} (58.38 sq mi)

Population (2022)
  - Total: 123,352
  - Density: 815.77/km^{2} (2,112.8/sq mi)
- Demonym: Balaganji
- Time zone: UTC+6 (BST)
- Postal code: 3120
- Area code: 08222
- Website: balaganj.sylhet.gov.bd

Balaganj (Bengali: বালাগঞ্জ) is the third largest upazila of Sylhet District in Sylhet Division, Bangladesh.

Balaganj Upazila mauza geocode map

== History ==
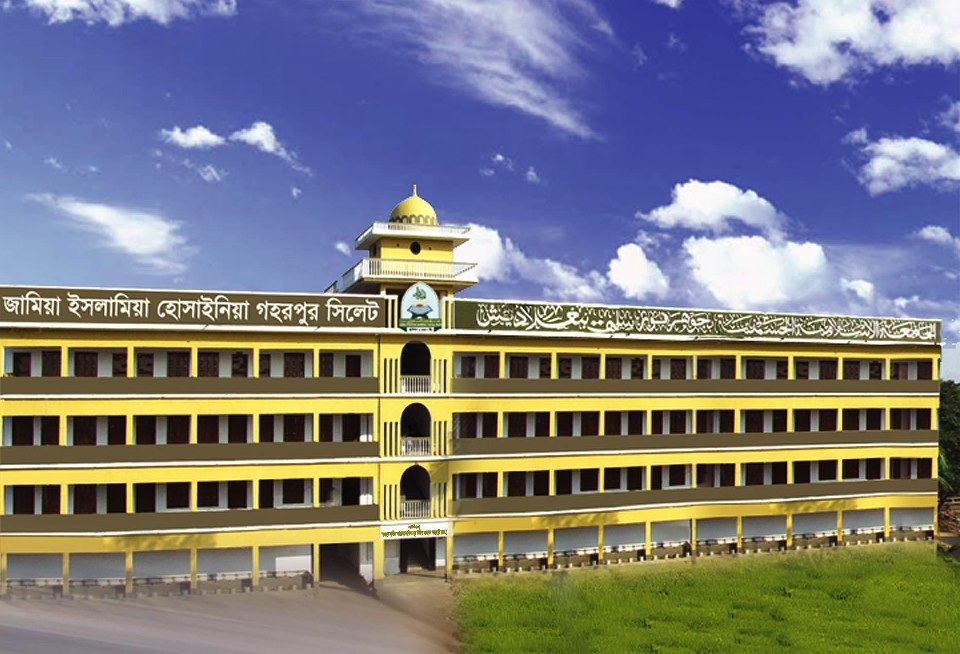
The Jamia Islamia Hosainia madrasa in Gohorpur, Balaganj

The area presently known as Balaganj was formerly designated Kushiyarakul, a name derived from the abundance of sugarcane historically cultivated in the region. It is situated along the banks of the Kushiyara River, which shares the same etymological origin. A Hindu religious establishment, the Madan Mohan Jiu Ashram, was later founded by the Zamindar of Barachar in the central market area in honour of Madanamohana, an incarnation of Krishna. This led to the locale being referred to as Madanganj, meaning “marketplace of Madan”. Female devotees of the temple were noted for wearing numerous bangles (bala) on both arms, a custom that gained such cultural prominence that the area eventually became known as Balaganj—literally, “bangle town”. In the 18th century, Balaganj was under the hold of Lala Anandaram, a zamindar of Sylhet. His wife is recorded as having attempted to bestow the Balaganj marketplace to Dharmadas, the grand-disciple of the renowned Hindu saint Shantaram. Balaganj thana was established in 1882 and included parts of present-day Osmani Nagar, Fenchuganj and Rajnagar. It separated from Fenchuganj and Rajnagar by 10 January 1922.

Balaganj was the scene of the battles at Sherpur and Sadipur during the Bangladesh Liberation War in 1971. On 18 May 1971, residents of Galimpur village in Balaganj were coerced into paying bribes in an attempt to avert a military incursion. Despite these efforts, on 20 May, units of the Pakistan Army entered the village and commenced a campaign of indiscriminate violence. Six individuals were executed immediately upon the army's arrival. As villagers attempted to flee, an additional 26 people, several of them adolescents, were fatally shot. Military personnel engaged in widespread looting, the burning of more than one hundred homes, and the abduction of women from the area. A second major incident occurred in the early morning hours of 14 June 1971, when the Pakistan Army entered Adityapur village, also within Balaganj. Utilising loudspeakers, soldiers disseminated false information regarding the formation of a so-called "Peace Committee" and instructed villagers to assemble. Trusting the announcement, a large number of residents gathered in front of the Adityapur Government Primary School. There, 65 male villagers were restrained and lined up; 63 were subsequently executed by gunfire. Two individuals survived by feigning death. Following the executions, the village was looted and further abductions of women were reported. These mass graves in Balaganj remain to day as a site of remembrance in Adityapur and Bhatpara Salimpur.

It is the third largest upazila of Sylhet district by population. It was turned into an upazila on 7 November 1982. It consists of 14 union parishads, 241 mouzas and 467 villages.

== Geography ==
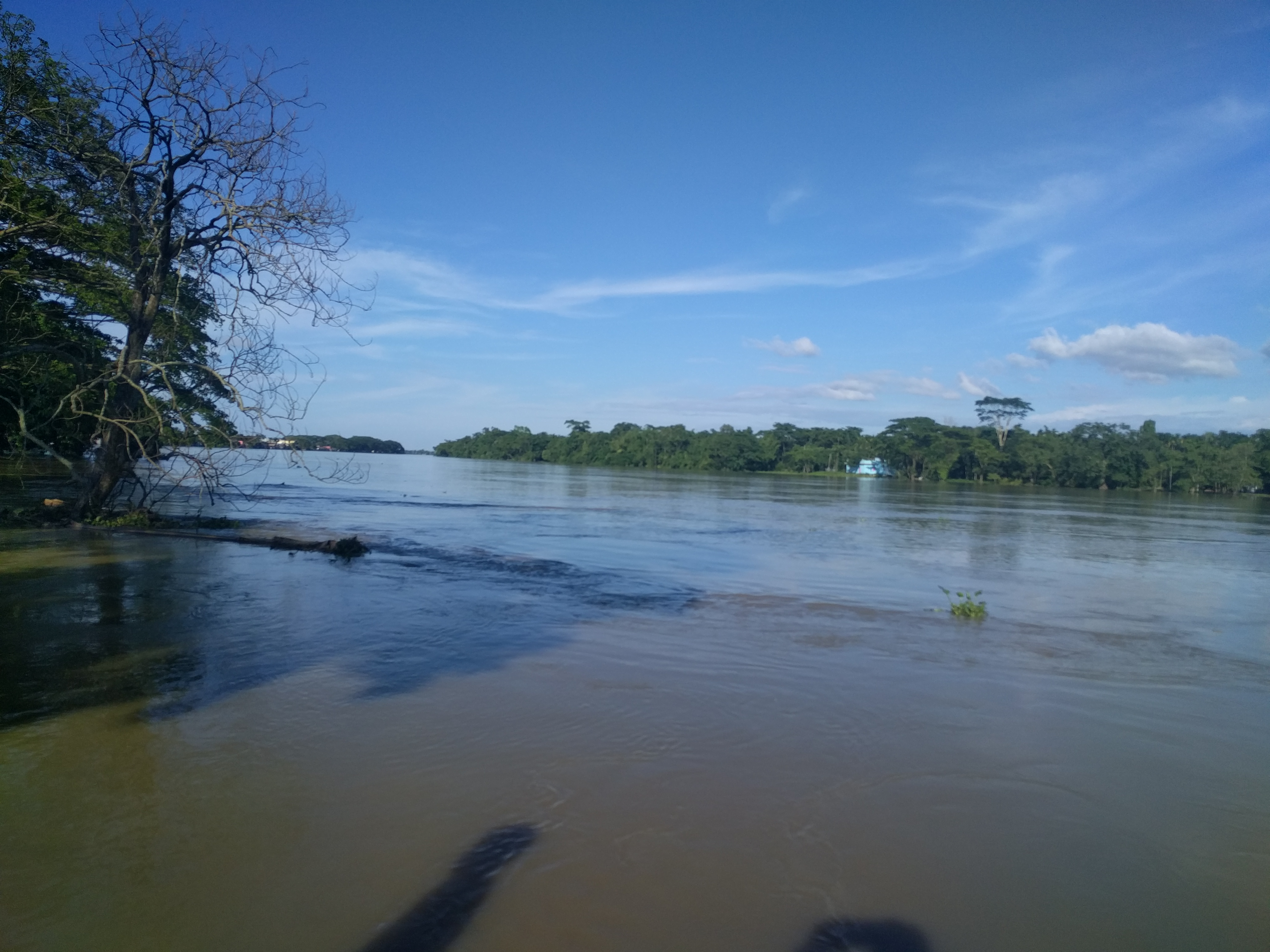
Kushiyara River in Balaganj Upazila

Balaganj stands on the Kushiyara River and is on the southwest periphery of Sylhet district. To the north is Sylhet Sadar Upazila, to the south are Rajnagar Upazila and Moulvibazar Sadar Upazila in Moulvibazar District, Fenchuganj Upazila of this district is on the east and on the west is Bishwanath Upazila of this district and Jagannathpur Upazila of Sunamganj District. Geographically Balaganj Upazila is situated at about 24.36* and 24.47* longitude and 91.38* and 91.56* east latitude. The distance of the Upazila headquarter(HQ) from the district HQ is nearly 37 km. The land area is approximately 151.21 km^{2}

Balaganj is located at 24.6667°N 91.8333°E. It has 19,960 household units and occupies an area of 389.51 km^{2}. The upazila is bordered on the north by Sylhet Sadar and Bishwanath Upazilas, on the east by Fenchuganj Upazila, on the South by Maulvibazar Sadar and Rajnagar upazilas of Maulvibazar district, and on the west by Jagannathpur Upazila of Sunamganj district and Nabiganj Upazila of Habiganj district.

== Demographics ==
Religions in Balaganj Upazila (2022)
Religion	Percent
Islam	90.13%
Hinduism	9.86%
Other or not stated	0.01%

According to the 2022 Bangladeshi census, Balaganj Upazila had 23,171 households and a population of 123,352. 8.85% of the population were under 5 years of age. Balaganj had a literacy rate (age 7 and over) of 76.63%: 77.66% for males and 75.68% for females, and a sex ratio of 92.46 males for every 100 females. 2,012 (1.63%) lived in urban areas.

According to the 2011 Census of Bangladesh, what is now Balaganj Upazila had 19,960 households and a population of 118,873. 31,824 (26.77%) were under 10 years of age. Balaganj had a literacy rate (age 7 and over) of 50.11%, compared to the national average of 51.8%, and a sex ratio of 1051 females per 1000 males. 7,811 (6.57%) lived in urban areas.

As of the 1991 Bangladesh census, Balaganj has a population of 230,865. Males constitute 50.67% of the population, and females 49.33%. Muslim 90.04%, Hindu 9.89%, Buddhist, Christian and others 0.07%. This Upazila's eighteen and over population is 115,624. Balaganj has an average literacy rate of 31.4% (7+ years), with the national average being 32.4%. The population is 256239 (Census 2001).

== Economy ==
Main hats, bazars and fairs Balaganj, Moyna Bazar, Goala Bazar, Tajpur Bazar, Doyamir Bazar, Pirer Bazar, Bualjur Bazar, Ilashpur Bazar, Azizpur Bazar, Goherpur Bazar/Murar Bazar, Madrasa Bazar, Bangla Bazar, Khaler Mukh Hats and Shior Khal Mela are notable.

Main occupations Agriculture 26.04%, service 24.51%, commerce 18.22%, agricultural labourer 11.31%, wage labourer 7.25%, fishing 4.29%, transport 1.97%, others 6.41%

== Administration ==
Balaganj Upazila is divided into 6 union parishads: Balaganj, Boaljur Bazar, Dewan Bazar, Omarpur, Paschim Gauripur, Purba Gauripur and Purba Pailanpur. The union parishads are subdivided into 239 mauzas and 473 villages. The current Upazila Chairman is Md. Mostaqur Rahman.

== Education ==
Educational institutions: 11 colleges, 57 secondary schools, 278 primary schools, 44 madrasas.

- Balaganj D.N. High School, D.N. High School
- Balaganj Degree College
- Islamia Mohammadiya Alim Madrasha

== Notable residents ==
- Iqbal Ahmed OBE, British businessman
- Dewan Abdur Rab Choudhury, politician
- Sundari Mohan Das, founder of Calcutta National Medical College
- Nur Uddin Gohorpuri, Islamic scholar
- Lutfur Rahman, British politician
- Girish Chandra Roy CIE, philanthropist and zamindar of Sylhet
- Tanzim Hasan Sakib, cricketer

== See also ==
- Upazilas of Bangladesh
- Districts of Bangladesh
- Divisions of Bangladesh
- Thanas of Bangladesh
- Union councils of Bangladesh
- Administrative geography of Bangladesh
- National Institute of Local Government
- Local government in Bangladesh
- Demographics of Bangladesh
- Villages of Bangladesh
- Executive magistrate (Bangladesh)
- Executive Magistrate of Bangladesh
- Bangladesh Civil Service
