= List of people from Sylhet Division =

This is a list of notable residents and people who have origins in the Sylhet Division of Bangladesh and the Barak Valley of the Indian state of Assam. This list also includes British Bangladeshis, Bangladeshi Americans, Bangladeshi Canadians, Bangladeshi Europeans and other non-resident Sylhetis who have origins in Greater Sylhet.

== Activism and cause célèbres ==
- Abdul Muktadir, academician martyred in the Bangladesh Liberation War
- Altab Ali, factory garment worker murdered by three teenagers in a racially motived attack on 4 May 1978.
- Anudvaipayan Bhattacharya, university lecturer martyred in the Bangladesh Liberation War
- Dia Chakravarty, political activist, singer, former political director of the TaxPayers' Alliance and editor of The Daily Telegraph.
- Gurusaday Dutt, founder of the Bratachari movement
- Jagat Joity Das, Mukti Bahini member killed in the Bangladesh Liberation War
- Kakon Bibi, freedom fighter and secret agent in the Bangladesh Liberation War
- Kamala Bhattacharya, student martyred in the Bengali Language Movement of the Barak Valley
- Leela Roy, reformer and politician
- M. A. G. Osmani, commander-in-chief of Bangladesh Liberation War
- Rawshan Ara Bachchu, woman rights activist and part of the Bengali language movement
- Rubel Ahmed, died in Morton Hall immigration detention centre under controverted circumstances.
- Saifur Rahman (Bangladeshi politician), Mohammad Saifur Rahman was a Bangladeshi economist and politician.
- Sachindra Chandra Pal, student martyred in the Bengali Language Movement of the Barak Valley
- Shamsuddin Ahmed, medical doctor martyred in the Bangladesh Liberation War
- Sushil Sen, martyred in the Indian independence movement
- Suhasini Das, social worker and activist
- Syeda Shahar Banu, woman rights activist and part of the Bengali language movement
- Zobeda Khanom Chowdhury, woman rights activist and part of the Bengali language movement

== Art and design ==
- Dhruba Esh, cover artist and writer
- Jalal Ahmad, president of the Institute of Architects Bangladesh, vice-president of the Commonwealth Association of Architects
- Saiman Miah, architectural and graphic designer, designed one of the two £5 commemorative coins for the 2012 Summer Olympics.

== Business and industry ==
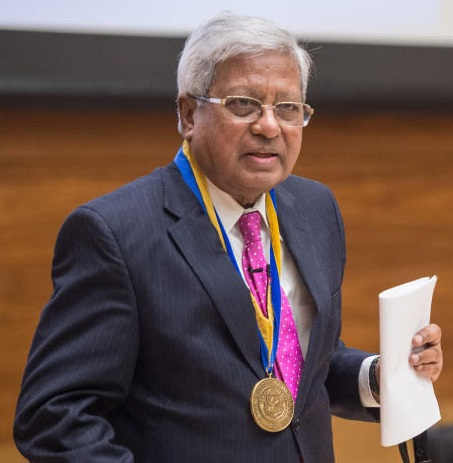
Sir Fazle Hasan Abed KCMG receiving the Thomas Francis Jr Medal in Global Public Health award from the University of Michigan (April 2016)

- Abdul Latif, British restaurateur known for his dish "Curry Hell".
- Ayub Ali Master, founder of the Shah Jalal Restaurant in London which became a hub for the British Asian community.
- Bajloor Rashid MBE, businessman and former president of the Bangladesh Caterers Association UK.
- Enam Ali, founder of the British Curry Awards, Spice Business Magazine and Ion TV
- Fazle Hasan Abed KCMG – founder of the world's largest non-governmental organisation, BRAC
- Foysol Choudhury MBE – Businessman, community activist and Chairman of Edinburgh and Lothians Regional Equality Council.
- Iqbal Ahmed OBE – Entrepreneur and CEO of Seamark Group. In 2006, he became the highest British Bangladeshi to feature on the Sunday Times Rich List (listed at number 511).
- James Leo Ferguson, tea industrialist and chairman of the Lakshmiprasad Union
- Mahee Ferdous Jalil, founder of Channel S, owner of Prestige Auto Group and TV presenter.
- Mamun Chowdhury – Businessman, and founder and co-director of London Tradition. In 2014, the company was awarded a Queen's Award for Enterprise for International Trade in recognition of its increase in sales.
- Muquim Ahmed – Entrepreneur who became the first Bangladeshi millionaire at the age of 26 due to diversification in banking, travel, a chain of restaurants with the Cafe Naz group, publishing and property development.
- Ragib Ali – Industrialist, pioneer tea-planter, educationalist, philanthropist and banker
- Shah Abdul Majid Qureshi, first Sylheti to open a restaurant in the United Kingdom
- Shelim Hussain – Founder of Euro Foods (UK)
- Syed Ahmed – Candidate on BBC reality television programme The Apprentice
- Mohammad Ajman "Tommy" Miah MBE – Celebrity chef and restaurateur. In 1991, he founded the Indian Chef of the Year Competition.

== Education and sciences ==
Abdul Malik was Pakistan's first cardiologist.

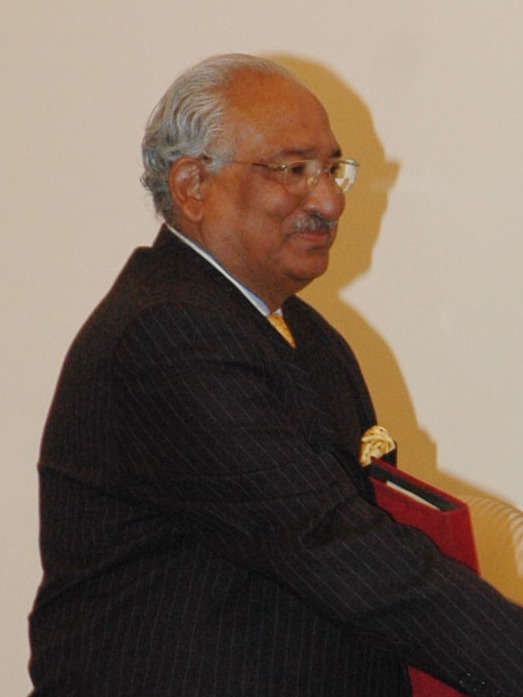
In 1994, Saifur Rahman was elected governor of the golden jubilee conference of the World Bank and International Monetary Fund in Madrid, Spain.

- Shafi Ahmed, surgeon and entrepreneur
- Ragib Ali, founder of Leading University, Jalalabad Ragib-Rabeya Medical College and the University of Asia Pacific
- Nurunnahar Fatema Begum, head of paediatric cardiology at the Combined Military Hospital (Dhaka)
- Najma Chowdhury, founder of the Women and Gender Studies department in the University of Dhaka, adviser to Caretaker Government of Bangladesh
- Padmanath Bhattacharya, professor at Cotton University
- Sasanka Chandra Bhattacharyya, natural product chemist and director of Bose Institute, Kolkata
- Sadruddin Ahmed Chowdhury, physicist and vice-chancellor of Shahjalal University of Science and Technology and Sylhet International University
- Sundari Mohan Das, founder principal of Calcutta National Medical College
- Govinda Chandra Dev, Professor of Philosophy at the University of Dhaka assassinated at the onset of the Bangladesh Liberation War by the Pakistan Army
- Parvez Haris, biomedical science professor at De Montfort University
- Aminul Hoque MBE, lecturer at Goldsmiths, University of London, writer
- K M Baharul Islam, Dean of the Indian Institute of Management Kashipur
- Syed Manzoorul Islam, critic, writer, former professor of Dhaka University
- Muhammed Zafar Iqbal, physicist, writer and columnist
- Mohammad Ataul Karim, Provost and Executive Vice Chancellor of the University of Massachusetts Dartmouth
- Mamun al-Mahtab, hepatologist
- Sudhansu Datta Majumdar, physicist and faculty member of the Indian Institute of Technology Kharagpur
- Nurul Islam Nahid, former Education Minister of Bangladesh
- M. A. Rashid, first Vice-chancellor of Bangladesh University of Engineering and Technology
- Raja Girish Chandra Roy CIE, founder of Murari Chand College
- Abu Nasr Waheed, educationist, was born in Sylhet in 1878.

=== National Professors of Bangladesh ===
- Dewan Mohammad Azraf, teacher, author, politician
- Jamilur Reza Choudhury, vice-chancellor of University of Asia Pacific, adviser to Caretaker Government of Bangladesh
- Abdul Malik, Brigadier (rtd.), founder of National Heart Foundation
- Rangalal Sen, academician and writer
- Shahla Khatun, obstetrician and gynecologist

== Economists ==
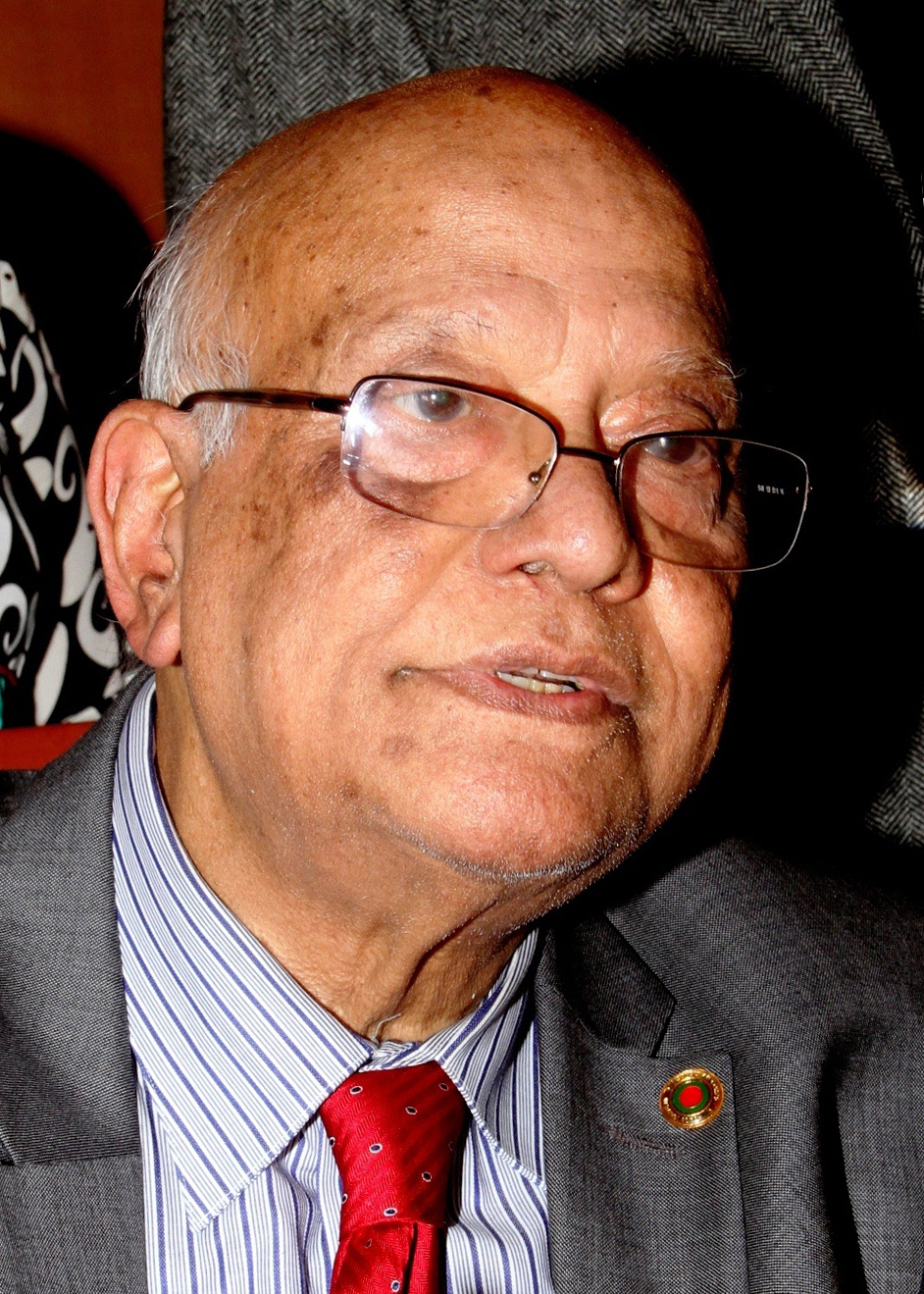
Abul Maal Abdul Muhith, an economist, diplomat, and Bengali language movement veteran who served Bangladesh's 2nd Finance Minister.

- Abul Maal Abdul Muhith, former Finance Minister of Bangladesh
- B. B. Bhattacharya, professor and Director of the Institute of Economic Growth in Delhi
- Mohammed Farashuddin, 7th Governor of Bangladesh Bank, founder of East West University
- Mrinal Datta Chaudhuri, theoretical economist, academic and professor of the Delhi School of Economics
- Qazi Kholiquzzaman Ahmad, chairman of the Dhaka School of Economics
- Saifur Rahman, longest serving Finance Minister of Bangladesh and a leader of BNP
- Shah A M S Kibria, economist, diplomat and former executive secretary of the United Nations' ESCAP
- Shegufta Bakht Chaudhuri, 4th Governor of Bangladesh Bank

== Entertainment ==
- Adnan Faruque, actor, presenter, model and YouTuber
- Ali Shahalom, comedian and television presenter
- Azim, actor best known for the role of Rahim Badshah in Rupban
- Bibhash Chakraborty, theatre personality and actor
- C. B. Zaman, film director, actor, and model
- Helal Khan, film actor and producer
- Khaled Choudhury, theatre personality and artist
- Khalil Ullah Khan, film and TV actor
- Marjana Chowdhury, a Beauty pageant residing in the United States
- Nadiya Hussain, columnist, chef, author and TV personality best known for winning the baking competition The Great British Bake Off
- Niranjan Pal, playwright, director and founding member of Bombay Talkies
- Raihan Rafi, film director and screenwriter
- Ruhul Amin (British film director)
- Salman Shah, film actor
- Shefali Chowdhury, actress best known for the role of Parvati Patil in Harry Potter

== Families ==
- Abaqati family, Uttar Pradeshi family who had jagirs in Sylhet
- Mazumdars of Sylhet, Nawabs and Qanungoh of Barshala/Gorduar/Mazumdari, Sylhet
- Pal family, a former ruling family of Panchakhanda, Beanibazar
- Nawabs of Prithimpassa, founded by Sakhi Salamat Isfahani
- Sareqaum, custodians of Shah Jalal's dargah complex, founded by Haji Yusuf

== Journalism ==
- Altaf Husain, 1st editor-in-chief of Pakistan's oldest, leading and most widely read English-language newspaper, Dawn and former Industry Minister of Pakistan
- Hasina Momtaz, former press officer for the Mayor of London
- Hassan Shahriar, journalist
- Lenin Gani, senior member of the Bangladesh Sports Journalists Association
- Rizwan Hussain, TV presenter, philanthropist, humanitarian aid worker, barrister and former CEO of Global Aid Trust
- Rizwana Hasan, attorney, Hero of the Environment and winner of the Goldman Environmental Prize and Ramon Magsaysay Award
- Salah Choudhury, editor of Weekly Blitz
- Shamim Chowdhury, TV and print journalist for Al Jazeera English
- Sirajul Hossain Khan, editor of Pakistan Times and the Eastern News Agency.
- Syed Mohammad Ali, founder of The Daily Star – the largest circulating daily English-language newspaper in Bangladesh.
- Syed Nahas Pasha, journalist and editor of Janomot and Curry Life

== Legal ==
- Abdul Moshabbir, lawyer and politician
- Knight Bachelor Akhlaq Choudhury, first Muslim at the British High Court of Justice
- Irene Khan, seventh Secretary General of Amnesty International, Director-General of the International Development Law Organization
- Khatun Sapnara, judge and first non-white to be elected to the Family Law Bar Association Committee. In 2006, she was appointed as a Recorder of the Crown, which made her the only person of Bangladeshi origin in a senior judicial position.

== Literature ==
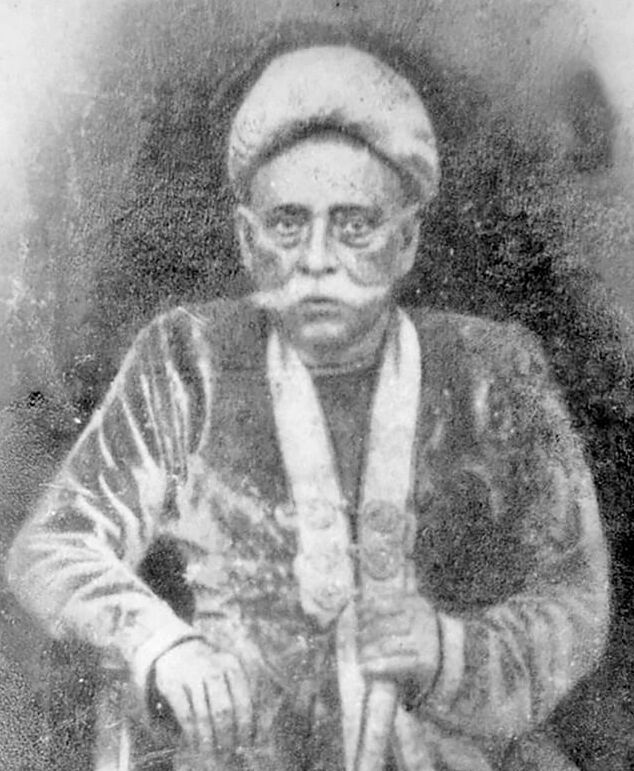
Hason Raja, a mystical poet and songwriter

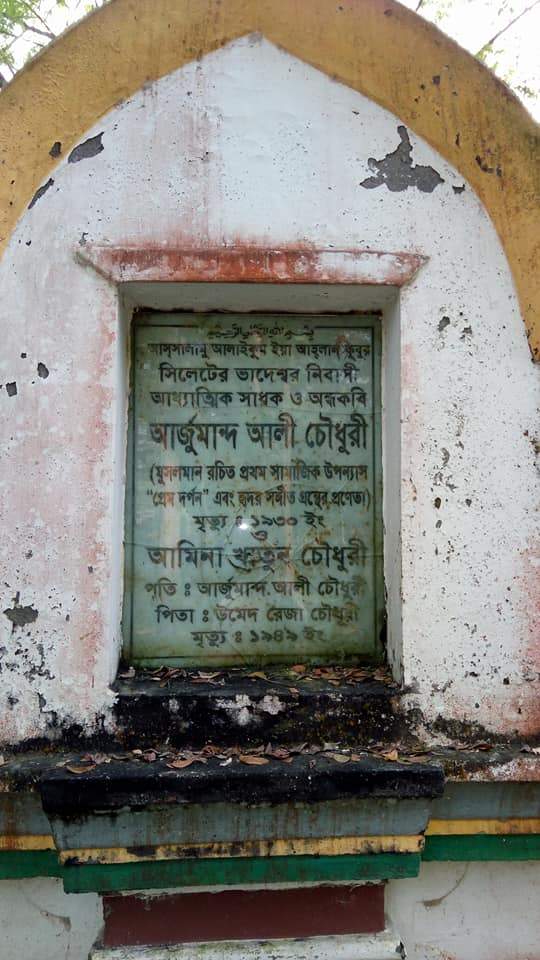
- Arjumand Ali, first Bengali Muslim novelist
  Abdur Rouf Choudhury, writer
- Achyut Charan Choudhury, writer and historian
- Arjumand Ali, first Bengali Muslim novelist
- Arun Kumar Chanda, freedom fighter, social worker, writer and editor of the Saptak
- Asaddor Ali, writer and researcher of Sylheti folk literature
- Ashraf Hussain, poet, writer, researcher of folk literature
- Chowdhury Gulam Akbar, writer and collector of Bengali folk literature for the Bangla Academy
- Dilwar Khan, poet known as Gonomanusher Kobi (Poet of the mass people)
- Dwijen Sharma, naturalist and science writer
- Gurusaday Dutt, folklorist
- Hason Raja, minstrel and writer of mystical songs
- Ibrahim Ali Tashna, poet, Islamic scholar and activist
- Ismail Alam, Urdu poet and activist
- Mufti Nurunnessa Khatun, writer, academic, and botanist
- Muhammad Mojlum Khan, non-fiction writer best known for The Muslim 100
- Muhammad Nurul Haque, cultural activist, social worker and writer
- Sadeq Ali, writer, poet and judge best known for the Halat-un-Nabi puthi
- Shahida Rahman, author and publisher
- Syed Mujtaba Ali, author, journalist, travel enthusiast, academician, scholar and linguist.
- Syed Murtaza Ali, writer and historian
- Syed Sultan, wrote the first Prophetic biography in Bengali in 16th century

== Military ==
- Anwarul Momen, general officer commanding 17th Infantry Division
- Ashab Uddin, major general and ambassador to Kuwait and Yemen
- Hasan Mashhud Chowdhury, 11th Chief of Army Staff of the Bangladesh Army
- Ismail Faruque Chowdhury, engineer-in-chief of the Bangladesh Army
- Bangabir M. A. G. Osmani, Supreme Commander of the Mukti Bahini
- Mahbub Ali Khan, Bangladesh Navy rear admiral and the Chief of Naval Staff
- Mahmudur Rahman Majumdar, Bangladesh Army brigadier, formerly the most senior ethnic Bengali in the Pakistan Army
- Mohammad Abdur Rab, 1st Chief of Army Staff of the Bangladesh Army, Major general during the Bangladesh Liberation War
- Muhammad Ghulam Tawab, Bangladesh's second Chief of Air Staff
- Nurul Huq, second temporary chief of Bangladesh Navy
- Prince Garuda of Gour, fought against the Muslims during the Conquest of Sylhet
- Syed Mohammad Ziaul Haque, Bangladesh Army officer and fugitive
- Syed Nasiruddin – Sipah Salar of Shamsuddin Firoz Shah

== Monarchs and rulers ==
Chronological list of articles:

- Gour Govinda, final king of the Gour Kingdom, defeated in the Conquest of Sylhet
- Sikandar Khan Ghazi, first wazir of Srihat
- Haydar Ghazi, second wazir of Srihat
- Muqabil Khan, wazir of Srihat in 1440
- Khurshid Khan, minister of Srihat, constructed numerous mosques
- Sarwar Khan, Nawab of Sylhet after Gawhar Khan
- Mir Khan, Nawab and Qanungoh of Sylhet
- Bayazid of Sylhet, Baro-Bhuyan Afghan chieftain who ruled over North Sylhet
- Muhammad Sani, Manipur migrant
- Khwaja Usman, Baro-Bhuyan Afghan chieftain who ruled over South Sylhet
- Mubariz Khan, Mughal sardar of Sylhet, fought against many Baro-Bhuiyan chieftains
- Mukarram Khan, Mughal sardar of Sylhet who would later become Subahdar of Bengal
- Mirak Bahadur Jalair, Mughal sardar of Sylhet
- Lutfullah Shirazi, Mughal faujdar of Sylhet from 1658 to 1665
- Isfandiyar Khan, Mughal faujdar of Sylhet
- Mahafata Khan, Mughal faujdar of Sylhet
- Farhad Khan, most well-known Mughal faujdar of Sylhet
- Sadeq Khan, Mughal faujdar of Sylhet
- Abdullah Shirazi, Mughal faujdar of Sylhet and mosque builder
- Robert Lindsay, 4th superintendent and 1st collector of Sylhet from 1778 to 1790

== Music and dance ==
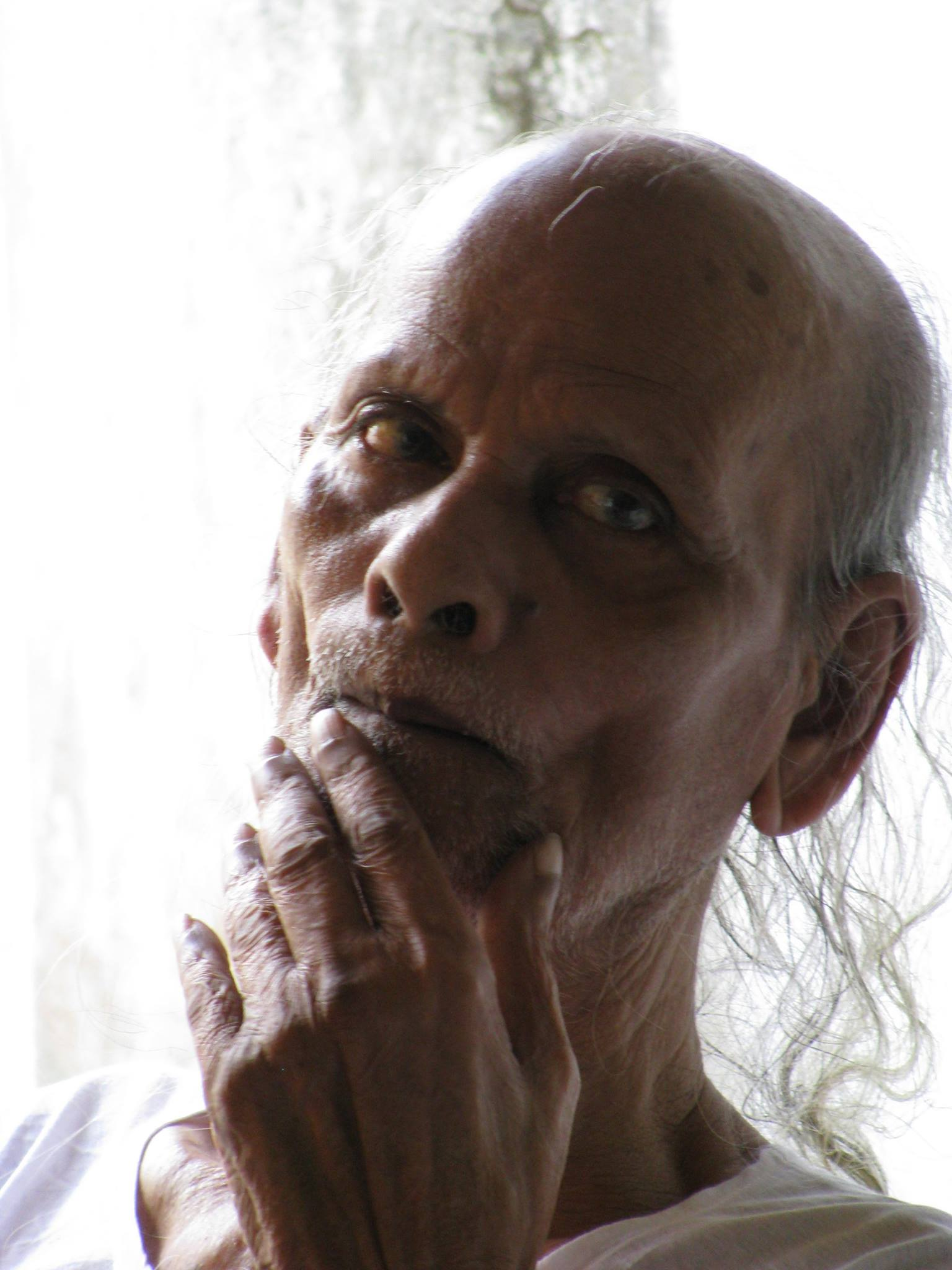
Shah Abdul Karim is a Bangladeshi Baul musician and Songwriter

- Alaur Rahman, singer and music teacher
- Amina Khayyam, dancer and choreographer
- Bidit Lal Das, folk singer and composer
- Debojit Saha, playback singer
- Gouri Choudhury, music teacher
- Kalika Prasad Bhattacharya, folk singer
- Mumzy Stranger, singer, producer and lyricist
- Radharaman Dutta, lyricist and composer of folk and traditional dhamail
- Ramkanai Das, classical and folk musician
- Runa Laila, playback singer
- Sanjeeb Chowdhury, singer and journalist
- Shah Abdul Karim, minstrel and folk songwriter
- Shapla Salique, singer and harmonium player
- Shushama Das, folk musician
- Shuvro Dev, playback singer
- Subir Nandi, playback singer

== Politics and government ==
=== Bangladesh ===
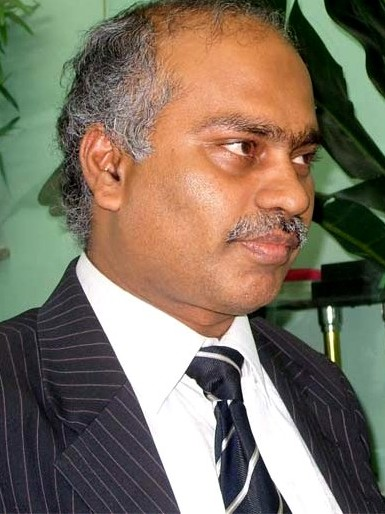
Mukhlesur Rahman Chowdhury was a former adviser to President Iajuddin Ahmed during the Caretaker Government.

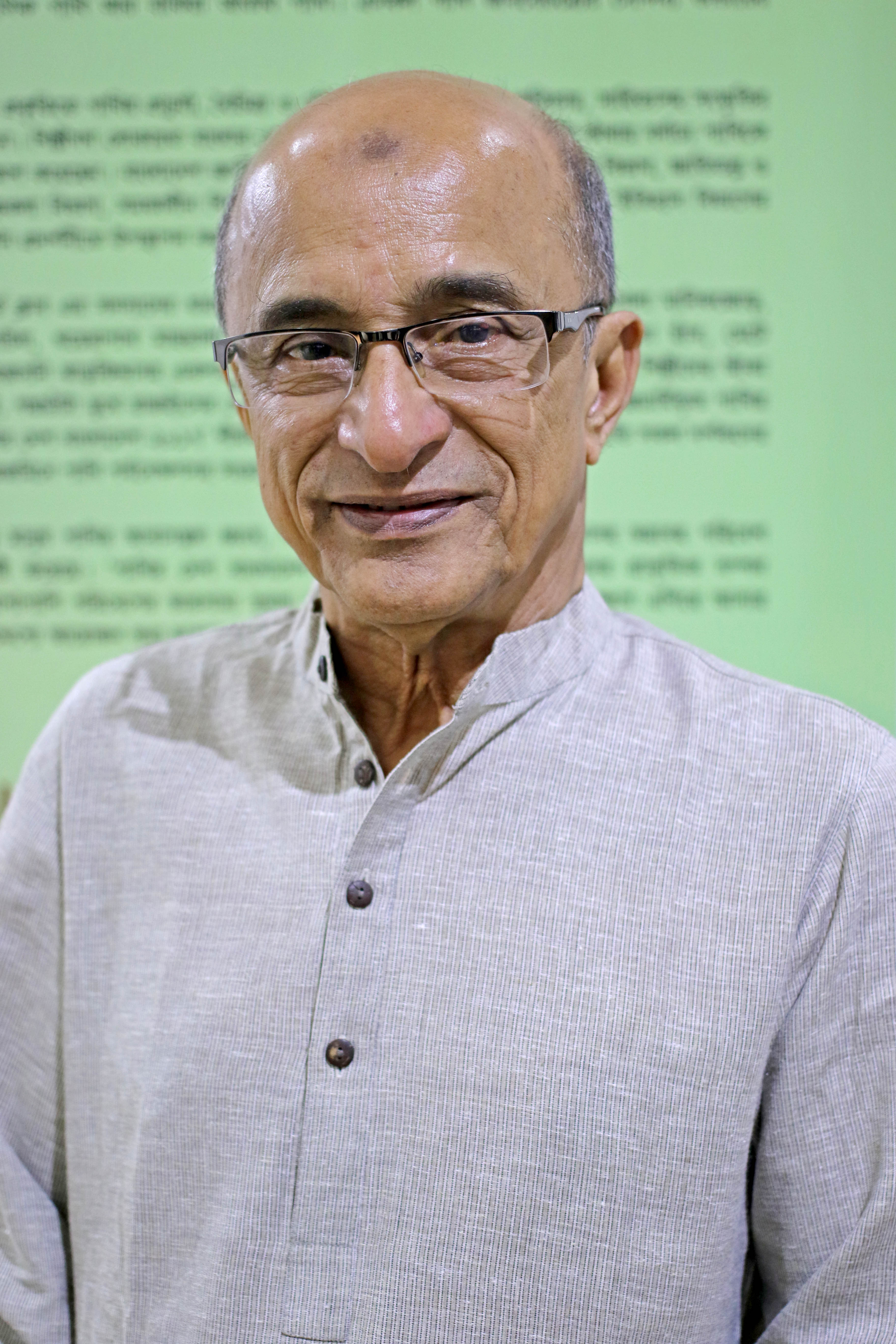
Dr Tawfiq-e-Elahi Chowdhury served as Secretary to the Govt. of Bangladesh for nearly a decade in the Ministries of Food, Statistics, Power Energy & Mineral Resources and Planning.

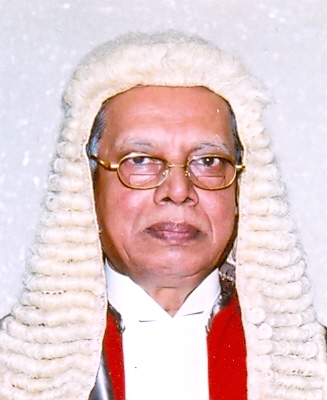
J. R. Mudassir Husain served as Chief Justice from 2004 to 2007.

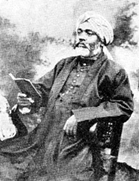
Syed Abdul Majid was a very notable pioneer in the native tea industry.

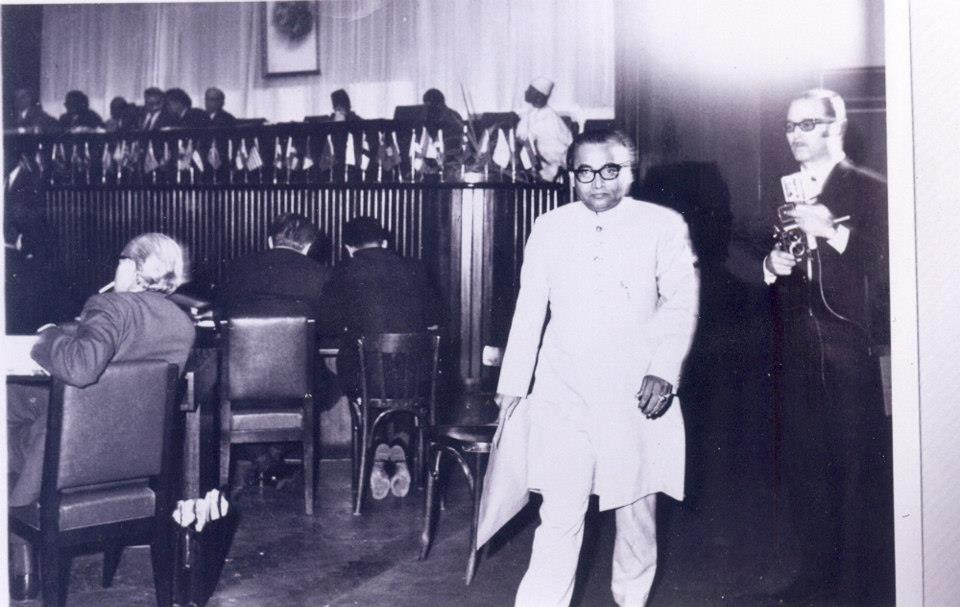
Mahmud Ali demanded the recognition of Bengali as a national language of Pakistan.

- Abdus Shahid, former chief whip for Bangladesh Awami League
- Ariful Haque Choudhury, Mayor of Sylhet
- Badar Uddin Ahmed Kamran, former mayor of Sylhet
- C. M. Shafi Sami, former Bangladeshi diplomat
- Hafiz Ahmed Mazumder, chairman of Bangladesh Red Crescent Society, Pubali Bank Board of Directors and founder of Scholarshome
- Humayun Rashid Choudhury, former speaker of the Jatiya Sangsad, 41st President of the UN General Assembly
- Ilias Ali, Organizing Secretary of the Bangladesh National Party
- Mifta Uddin Chowdhury Rumi, vice-president of Bangladesh Nationalist Party-Sunamganj
- Shafiqur Rahman, Amir of Bangladesh Jamaat-e-Islami
- Syed Muazzem Ali, foreign service officer, high commissioner and career diplomat

==== Chief Justices ====
- J. R. Mudassir Husain, 14th Chief Justice of Bangladesh
- Mahmudul Amin Choudhury, 11th Chief Justice of Bangladesh
- Surendra Kumar Sinha, 21st Chief Justice of Bangladesh
- Syed A. B. Mahmud Hossain, 2nd Chief Justice of Bangladesh

==== Local ====
- Abdul Hakeem Chowdhury, East Pakistan Provincial council and National Assembly
- Abdul Majid Khan, former MP for Habiganj-2
- Abdul Matin, former MP for Moulvibazar-2
- Abdul Munim Chowdhury, former MP for Habiganj-1
- Abdul Muqit Khan, former MP for Sylhet-3
- Abdul Jabbar, former MP for the erstwhile Sylhet-13 constituency
- Abdul Qahir Chowdhury, former MP for Sylhet-5
- Abdur Raees, East Pakistan Provincial council and National Assembly
- Abdur Rahim, former MP for Sylhet-6
- Abu Lais Md. Mubin Chowdhury, former MP for Habiganj-3
- Abu Zahir, former MP for Habiganj-3
- Abul Hasnat Md. Abdul Hai, former member of the Jatiya Sangsad
- AKM Gouach Uddin, former MP for Sylhet-6
- Ameena Begum Shafiq, doctor and Jamaat-e-Islami politician
- Barun Roy, former MP for Sunamganj-1
- Dewan Farid Gazi, former leader of Habiganj-1
- Dildar Hossain Selim, former MP for Sylhet-4
- Enamul Haque Chowdhury, former MP for Sylhet-2
- Fatema Chowdhury Paru, BNP politician
- Gazi Mohammad Shahnawaz, MP for Habiganj-1
- Gulzar Ahmed Chowdhury, former MP for Sunamganj-3
- Harris Chowdhury, former MP for Sylhet-5
- Ismat Ahmed Chowdhury, MP for Habiganj-1
- Joya Sengupta, politician and doctor
- Khalilur Rahman Chowdhury, MP for Habiganj-1
- Khandaker Abdul Malik, former MP for Sylhet-1
- Lutfur Rahman, former MP for Sylhet-6
- Mahmud Us Samad Chowdhury, former MP for Sylhet-3
- Mahbub Ali, former MP for Habiganj-4
- Maqsood Ebne Aziz Lama, former MP for Sylhet-2
- MM Shahin, former MP for Moulvibazar-2
- Moazzem Hossain Ratan, former MP for Sunamganj-1
- Mokabbir Khan, MP for Sylhet-2
- Mohibur Rahman Manik, former MP for Sunamganj-5
- Mostafa Ali, member of the Bangladesh Constituent Assembly and former governor of Habiganj
- Najmul Hasan Zahed, former MP for Habiganj-2
- Naser Rahman, former MP for Moulvibazar-3 and chairman of the Saifur Rahman Foundation
- Nawab Ali Abbas Khan, Jatiya Party politician and three-time MP for Moulvibazar-2
- Nazim Kamran Choudhury, former MP
- Pir Fazlur Rahman, former MP for Sunamganj-4
- Salim Uddin, former MP for Sylhet-5
- Shafi Ahmed Chowdhury, former MP for Sylhet-3
- Shah Azizur Rahman, former MP for Sylhet-2
- Sharaf Uddin Khashru, former MP for Sylhet-6
- Sheikh Sujat Mia, former MP for Habiganj-1
- Sultan Mohammad Mansur Ahmed, member of Jatiya Sangsad and previously vice-president of Dhaka University Central Students' Union
- Syed Mahibul Hasan, former MP for Sylhet-16
- Syed Makbul Hossain, former MP for Sylhet-6
- Syeda Saira Mohsin, former MP for Moulvibazar-3
- Yahya Chowdhury, former MP for Sylhet-2

==== Ministers ====
- Abdul Haque, former Land Administration and Reforms Minister
- Abdul Mannan, Minister of Planning
- Abdus Samad Azad, former Foreign Minister of Bangladesh
- AK Abdul Momen, Minister of Foreign Affairs
- Enamul Haque Mostafa Shahid, former Minister of Social Welfare
- Imran Ahmad, Minister of Expatriates' Welfare and Overseas Employment
- Mukhlesur Rahman Chowdhury, former Adviser to President Iajuddin Ahmed
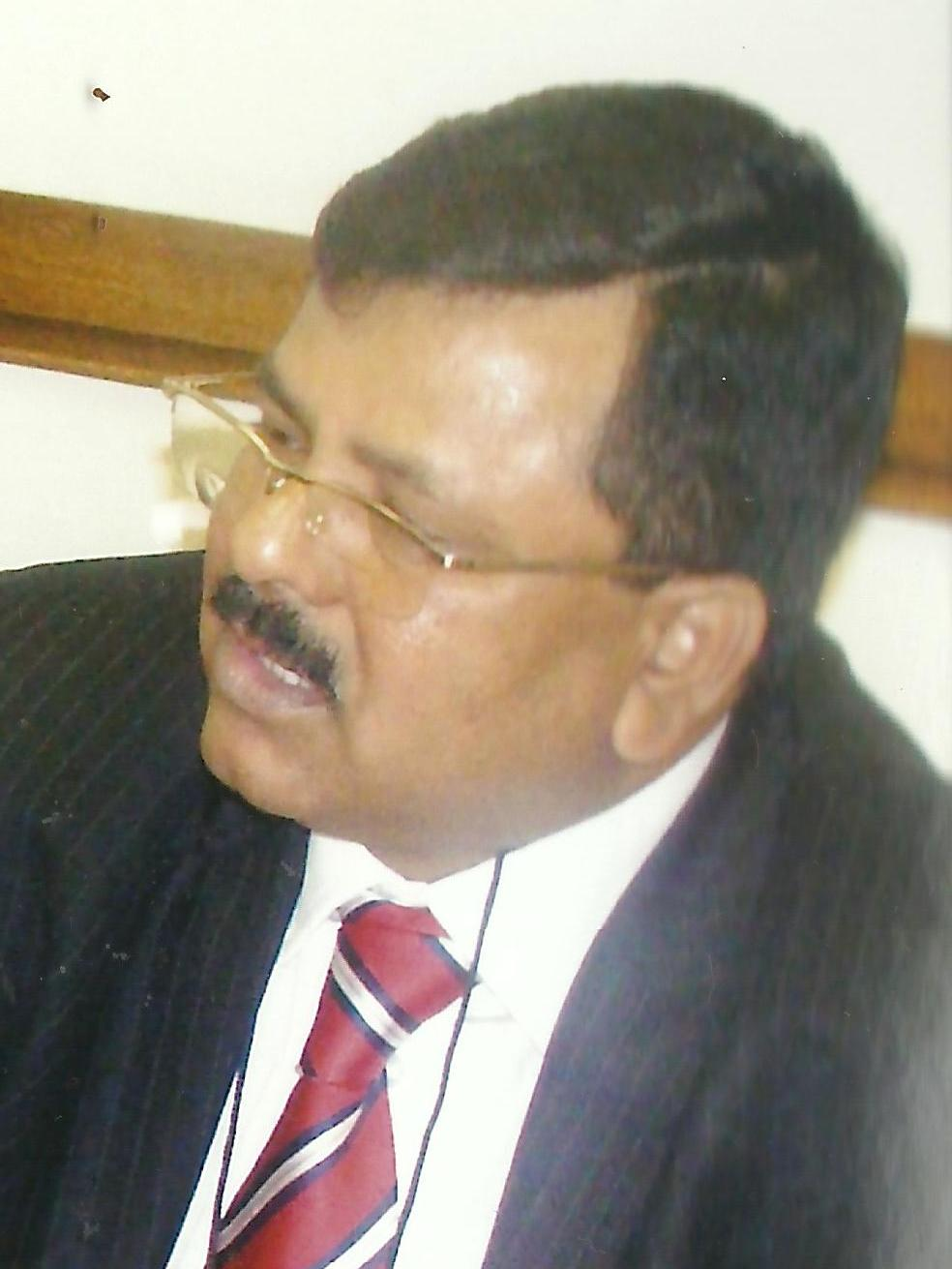
- M. Ilias Ali was a prominent politician in Sylhet and served as the Organising Secretary of the Bangladesh Nationalist Party
  Shamsher M. Chowdhury, Bangladeshi diplomat and former secretary of the Ministry of Foreign Affairs
- Shahab Uddin, Minister of Environment, Forest and Climate Change
- Suranjit Sengupta, former Minister of Railways
- Syed Mohsin Ali, former Minister of Social Welfare
- Tawfiq-e-Elahi Chowdhury, energy adviser to the prime minister of Bangladesh
- Rasheda K Chowdhury, primary and mass education adviser to the Caretaker Government led by Fakhruddin Ahmed

=== British India ===
- Abdul Matlib Mazumdar, freedom fighter and political leader known for retaining the Barak Valley in India
- Bipin Chandra Pal, Indian nationalist, one third of the Lal Bal Pal triumvirate
- Dewan Abdul Hamid Choudhury, member of the Assam Legislative Assembly
- Nawab Ali Haider Khan, 9th Nawab of Longla, minister and leader of the Independent Muslim Party
- Syed Abdul Majid CIE, first native minister of Assam, pioneer of the agricultural industry

=== Pakistan ===
- Ajmal Ali Choudhury, is known among the people of Sylhet as the “Quaid of Sylhet” in recognition of his significant role in the 1947 Sylhet referendum, which led to Sylhet's accession to East Pakistan.
- Abdul Hamid, Education Minister of Assam and later East Bengal
- Abu Ahmad Abdul Hafiz, Sylhet Muslim League founder and lawyer
- Abdul Hoque, politician, lawyer and freedom fighter
- Abdus Salam, Minister of Revenue in East Pakistan
- Moulvi Abdus Salam, Revenue Minister of East Bengal
- Abdul Khaleque Ahmed, member of the 3rd National Assembly of Pakistan
- Abdul Matin Chaudhary, member of the 1st National Assembly of Pakistan and Pakistan's first Minister of Agriculture
- Abdul Muntaquim Chaudhury, member of the 3rd National Assembly of Pakistan
- Aftab Ali, founder of All-India Seamen's Federation and vice-president of All-India Trade Union Congress
- Ajmal Ali, member of the 4th National Assembly of Pakistan
- Akhay Kumar Das, member of the 1st National Assembly of Pakistan
- Basanta Kumar Das, member of the 2nd National Assembly of Pakistan
- Begum Serajunnessa Choudhury, member of the 3rd National Assembly of Pakistan
- Dewan Abdul Basith, provincial minister of East Pakistan
- Dewan Abdur Rab Choudhury, provincial minister of East Pakistan
- Mahmud Ali, Freedom Movement leader, statesman
- Munawwar Ali, Speaker of the East Bengal Legislative Assembly
- Mohammad Keramat Ali, entrepreneur, philanthropist and politician
- Mushahid Ahmad Bayampuri, member of the 3rd National Assembly of Pakistan
- Muazzam Ahmed Choudhury, member of the 4th National Assembly of Pakistan
- মোহাম্মদ মুহিবুর রহমানMuhammad Muhibur Rahman member of the 3rd National Assembly of Pakistan
- Murtaza Raza Choudhry, member of the 1st National Assembly of Pakistan
- Saiful Alom, member of the East Bengal Legislative Assembly
- Qamarul Ahsan, member of the 3rd National Assembly of Pakistan
- Ibrahim Chatuli, member of the East Bengal Legislative Assembly
- Ibrahim Ali Tashna, poet, Islamic scholar and activist

=== India ===
- Abdul Munim Choudhury, former MLA of Karimganj South
- A. F. Golam Osmani, Indian National Congress member
- Amar Chand Jain, Bharatiya Janata Party politician
- Anwar Hussain Laskar, All India United Democratic Front politician
- Ashab Uddin, member of the Manipur Legislative Assembly
- Ataur Rahman Mazarbhuiya, All India United Democratic Front politician
- Azad Zaman, member of the Meghalaya Legislative Assembly
- Aziz Ahmed Khan, former MLA of Karimganj South
- Bijoy Malakar, MLA of Ratabari
- Chittendra Nath Mazumder, Bharatiya Janata Party politician
- Dilip Kumar Paul, Bharatiya Janata Party politician
- Dwarka Nath Das, Bharatiya Janata Party politician
- Hazi Salim Uddin Barbhuiya, MLA of Hailakandi
- Kabindra Purkayastha, senior leader of Bharatiya Janata Party in Assam
- Kali Ranjan Deb, Bharatiya Janata Party politician
- Kamalakhya Dey Purkayastha, former MLA of Karimganj North
- Karnendu Bhattacharjee, Indian National Congress member
- Kartik Sena Sinha, Bharatiya Janata Party politician
- Kishor Nath, former MLA of Barkhola
- Kripanath Mallah, Bharatiya Janata Party politician
- Krishnendu Paul, MLA of Patharkandi
- Lalit Mohan Suklabaidya, Indian National Congress member
- Madhusudhan Tiwari, former MLA of Patharkandi (1991–1996)
- Misbahul Islam Laskar, MLA of Barkhola
- Mission Ranjan Das, Bharatiya Janata Party politician
- Moinul Hoque Choudhury, five-time MLA, two-time UN General Assembly representative and Minister of Industrial Development
- Nepal Chandra Das, Indian National Congress member
- Nihar Ranjan Laskar, Indian National Congress member
- Parimal Suklabaidya, Bharatiya Janata Party politician
- Radheshyam Biswas, All India United Democratic Front politician
- Rajdeep Roy, Bharatiya Janata Party politician
- Ramapayare Rabidas, Bharatiya Janata Party politician
- Rashida Haque Choudhury, former Minister of State of Social Welfare
- Rumi Nath, former MLA of Barkhola
- Sambhu Sing Mallah, Bharatiya Janata Party politician
- Santosh Mohan Dev, former cabinet minister of the Government of India and 7-time Member of Parliament from Silchar, Assam and Tripura South.
- Satyabrata Mookherjee, former Minister of State
- Shukhendu Shekhar Dutta, former MLA of Patharkandi
- Siddique Ahmed, MLA of Karimganj South
- Subodh Das, MP for Panisagar
- Surendra Kumar Dey, first Union Cabinet minister for Cooperation and Panchayati raj
- Sushmita Dev, President of the All India Mahila Congress
- Suzam Uddin Laskar, All India United Democratic Front politician
- Tathagata Roy, controversial right-wing Hindutva associate

=== West ===
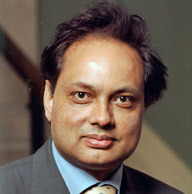
Anwar Choudhury was the first non-white British person to be appointed in a senior diplomatic post.

- Anwar Choudhury, The British High Commissioner for Bangladesh between 2004 and 2008. He is currently the Director of International Institutions at the Foreign & Commonwealth Office.
- Apsana Begum, first Hijabi to be elected as an MP for the Parliament of England
- Doly Begum, Canadian politician
- Gaus Khan, president of the United Kingdom Awami League
- Hansen Clarke, former congressman of MI 13
- Lutfur Rahman, the first directly elected mayor of Tower Hamlets and the first Bangladeshi leader of the council.
- Nadia Shah, former mayor of Camden. The first female mayor in the United Kingdom of Bangladeshi origin.
- Nasim Ali OBE, former mayor of Camden. He became UK's youngest mayor as well as the first Bangladeshi and first Muslim mayor.
- Rabina Khan, councillor for Shadwell and former Housing Cabinet member in Tower Hamlets
- Rushanara Ali, first Bangladeshi to be elected as an MP for the Parliament of England

== Religion and spirituality ==
=== Islam ===
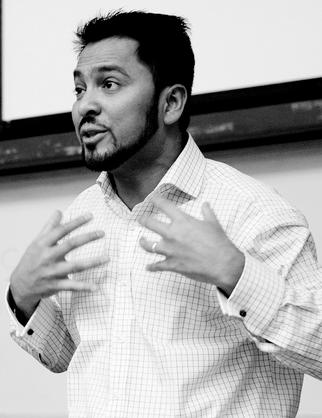
Ajmal Masroor was nominated for the Religious Advocate of the Year award at the 2013 & 2015 British Muslim Awards.

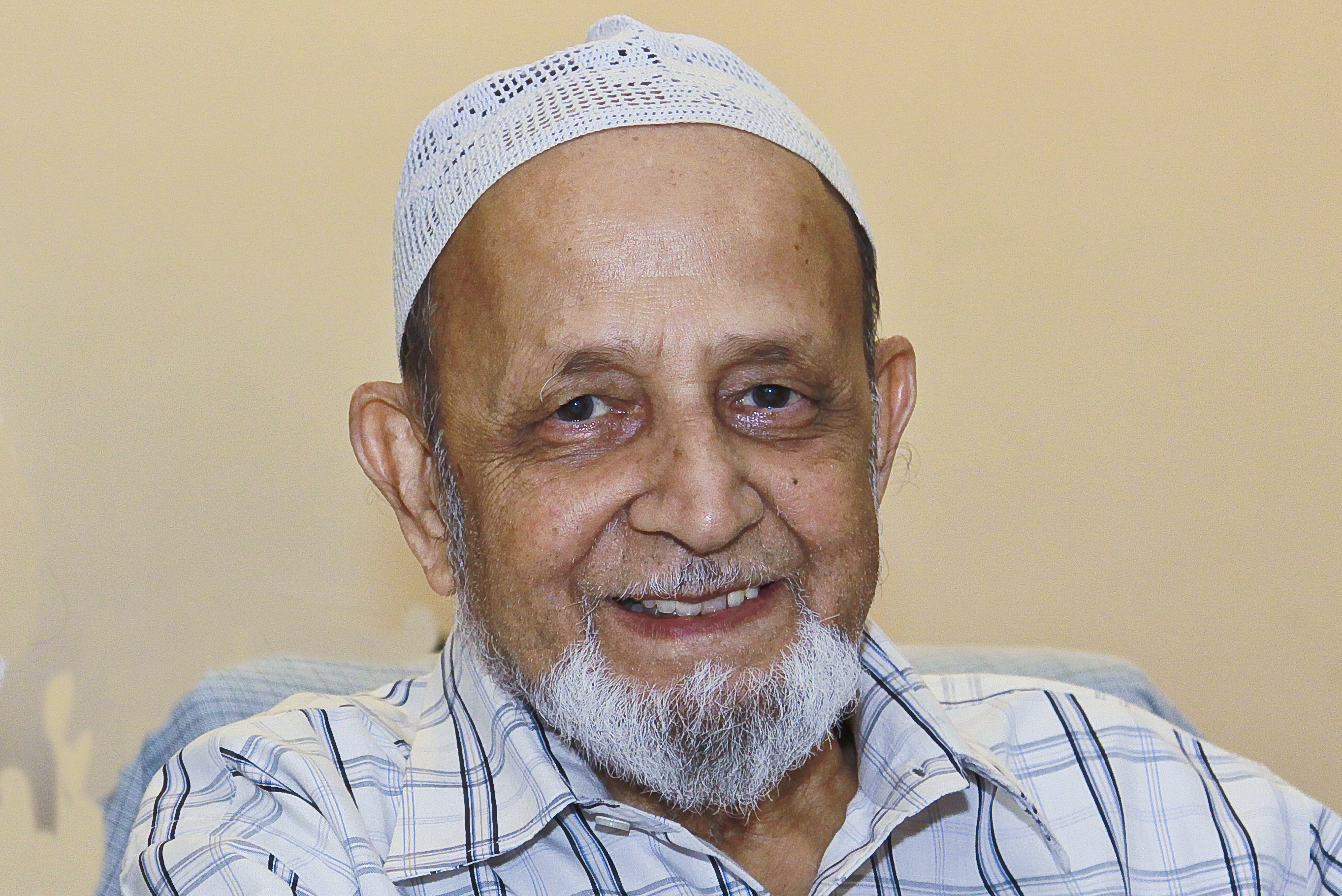
Zohurul Hoque has translated the entire Qur'an into the Bengali, Assamese and English languages.

- Shaikh-e-Fulbari Abdul Matin Chowdhury, a religious scholar and political activist
- Athar Ali, Deobandi scholar, author and founder of the Nizam-e-Islam party
- Mushahid Ahmad Bayampuri, Islamic scholar and parliamentarian
- Abdul Latif Chowdhury Fultali, Islamic scholar and founder of the Fultali movement
- Nur Uddin Gohorpuri, chairman of Befaqul Madarisil Arabia Bangladesh
- Abdul Momin Imambari, former president of Jamiat Ulema-e-Islam Bangladesh
- Abu Hena Saiful Islam, United States Navy's imam
- Ajmal Masroor, imam, TV presenter and politician
- Ibrahim Ali Tashna, Islamic scholar, poet and activist
- Ibrahim Danishmand, zamindar and Sufi scholar
- Najib Ali Choudhury, founder of the Madinatul Uloom Bagbari, the first madrasa in the Greater Sylhet region
- Nurul Islam Olipuri, mufassir and teacher
- Obaidul Haque Wazirpuri, former president of Befaqul Madarisil Arabia Bangladesh
- Oliur Rahman, founder president of Awami Ulama Party
- Tafazzul Haque Habiganji, former vice-president of Hefazat-e-Islam and Jamiat Ulema-e-Islam
- Ubaidul Haq, former khatib of Baitul Mukarram
- Zia Uddin, president of Jamiat Ulema-e-Islam Bangladesh
- Farid Uddin Chowdhury, former MP for Sylhet-5
- Zohurul Hoque, doctor and translator of the Qur'an

==== Shah Jalal's disciples ====
- Shah Jalal, Sufi saint associated with spreading Islam to Sylhet
- Ghazi Burhanuddin, considered to be Sylhet's first Muslim
- Haji Muhammad Yusuf, first custodian of Shah Jalal's dargah
- Adam Khaki, associated with spreading Islam to Badarpur
- Shah Gabru, associated with spreading Islam to Osmani Nagar
- Shah Malum, associated with spreading Islam to Fenchuganj
- Shah Paran, early disciple and nephew of Shah Jalal
- Shah Siddiq, associated with spreading Islam to Osmanpur

=== Other ===
- Shoshi Mukhi Das – Methodist missionary, teacher and nurse
- Chaitanya Mahaprabhu – Hindu mystic
- Shantidas Goswami, associated with spreading Hinduism to Manipur

== Sports ==
=== Bangladesh ===
==== Cricket ====
- Abu Jayed Rahi, cricketer
- Abul Hasan, cricketer
- A. K. M. Mahmood, cricketer
- Ahmed Sadequr, cricketer for Sylhet Division
- Alok Kapali, cricketer for Bangladesh
- Ardhendu Das, cricketer for Bengal (1934–1942)
- Ebadot Hossain, cricketer for Bangladesh
- Enamul Haque Jr, Bangladesh
- Hasibul Hossain, cricketer for Sylhet Division
- Henry Plowden, cricketer
- Imtiaz Hossain, cricketer
- Jahan Uddin, cricketer for Sikkim
- Khaled Ahmed, cricketer for Bangladesh
- Nasirul Alam, cricketer for Sylhet Division
- Nasum Ahmed, cricketer for Bangladesh
- Nazmul Hossain, Bangladesh
- Punya Datta, cricketer for Bengal and Cambridge University
- Rahatul Ferdous, cricketer
- Rajin Saleh, cricketer for Bangladesh
- Rezaul Haque, cricketer for Sylhet Division
- Sayem Alam, cricketer for Sylhet Division
- Shahanur Rahman, cricketer for Sylhet Division
- Shanaj Ahmed, cricketer for Sylhet Division
- Tapash Baisya, cricketer for Bangladesh

==== Football ====
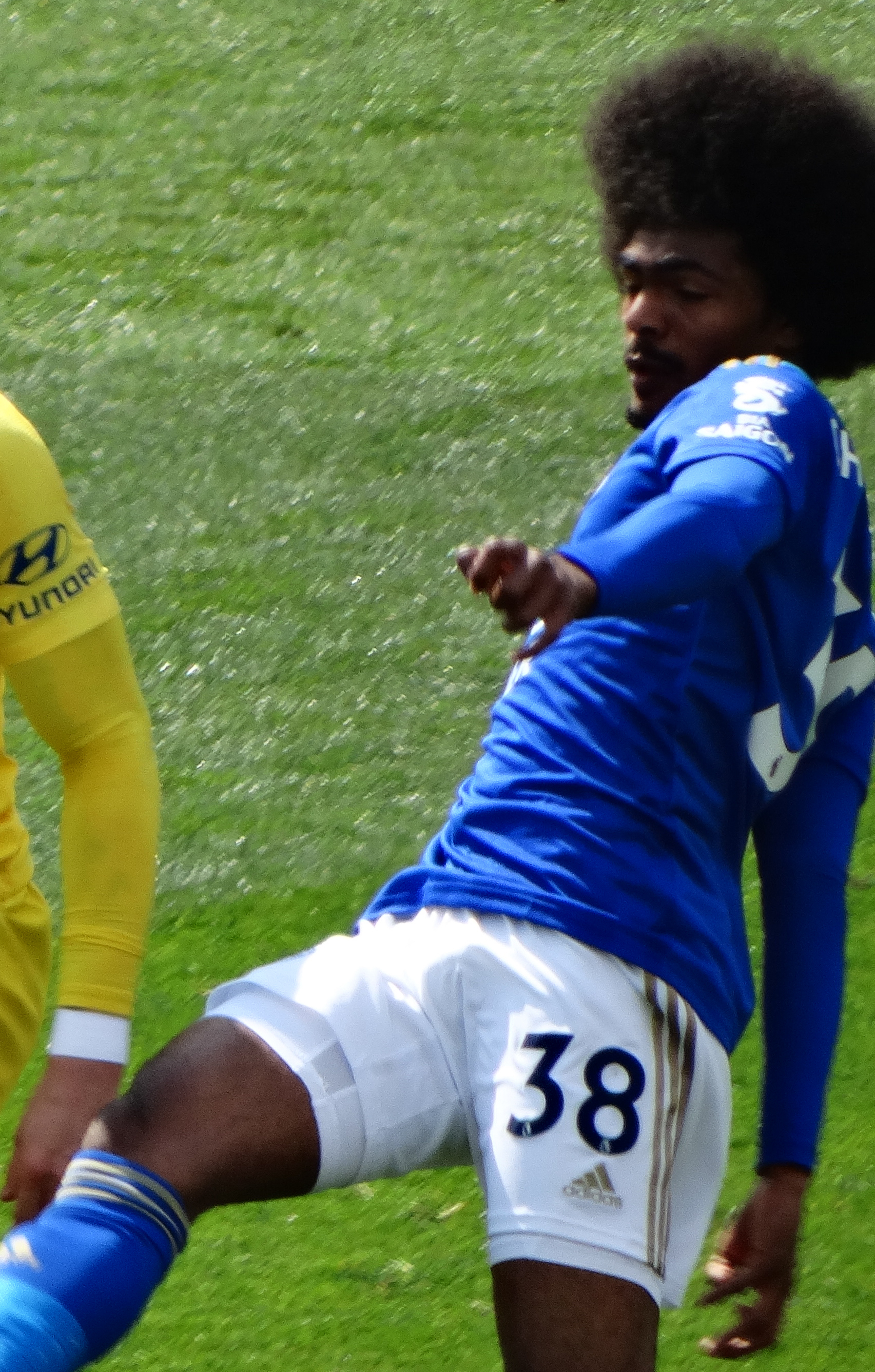
Hamza Choudhury playing in a Premier League match on 12 May 2019

- Alfaz Ahmed, former footballer for Bangladesh
- Ranjit Das, former footballer for East Pakistan
- Rezaul Karim Rehan, former footballer for Bangladesh
- Wahed Ahmed, former footballer for Bangladesh
- Hamza Choudhury, Bangladeshi midfielder for English football club Sheffield United F.C.
- Kaiser Hamid, former footballer for Mohammedan SC
- Mahbubur Rahman Sufil, footballer
- Md Saad Uddin, footballer
- Motin Mia, footballer
- Ekbal Hussain, footballer
- Biplu Ahmed, footballer
- Yeamin Ahmed Chowdhury Munna, footballer
- Shamit Shome, Canadian-born footballer for Bangladesh

==== Other ====
- Abdul Ali Jacko, two-time world lightweight kick-boxing champion
- Bulbul Hussain, wheelchair rugby player for Kent Crusaders and the Great Britain Paralympic team
- Jumman Lusai, former Bangladesh national field hockey team player and was also selected in the 1989 World XI hockey team.
- Rani Hamid, chess master, awarded the FIDE Woman International Master (WIM) title in 1985
- Ramnath Biswas, soldier and writer best known for circumnavigating the globe by bicycle.
- Ruqsana Begum – 2010 female atomweight Muay Thai kickboxing champion and nominated captain of the British Muay Thai Team.

=== India ===
- Ketaki Prasad Dutta, former president of the District Sports Association, Karimganj

== Fictional characters ==
- Ameera Khatun (played by Manjinder Virk in Call the Midwife)
- Avell (played by Sayfuz Ali in Badman)
- Ayub Mohammed (played by Shahnewaz Jake in Call the Midwife)
- Faruk Khatun (played by Abhisek Singh in Call the Midwife)
- Farzina Mohammed (played by Salma Hoque in Call the Midwife)
- Rahul Mohammed (played by Ahaan Gupta in Call the Midwife)
- Zaki (played by Islah Abdur-Rahman in Man Like Mobeen)
