= List of Sylhet Division cricketers =

This is presenting a complete list in alphabetical order of cricketers who have played for Sylhet Division in first-class, List A or Twenty20 matches since the team was formed ahead of the 1999–2000 season for the first National Cricket League (NCL) competition. Complying with other club lists, details are the player's name followed by his years active as a Sylhet player, current players to the end of the 2015–16 season.

This list excludes players who appeared for the team in 1999–2000 only. This is because the NCL was not a first-class competition in its opening season. Some players (for example, Niamur Rashid) played for Sylhet that season and then played in first-class cricket for other teams in later seasons.

== A ==
- Abu Jayed (2009–10 to 2015–16)
- Abul Hasan (2008–09 to 2015–16)
- Ahmed Sadequr
- Alok Kapali (1999–2000 to 2015–16)
- Al Wadud (2003–04)
- Anwar Akbar (2013–14 to 2014–15)
- Ariful Haque (2009–10)
- Arman Hossain (2006–07)
- Asdak Samad (2003–04)
- Ashiqur Rahman (2004–05 to 2005–06)
- Atiqur Rahman (2003–04)
- Avishek Mitra (2013–14)
- Ayubullah Sumon (2010–11)

== D ==
- Indika de Saram (Sri Lanka; 2009–10)
- R. Dewan (2011–12)
- Dhiman Ghosh (2009–10)

== E ==
- Enamul Haque (2001–02 to 2015–16)
- Ezaz Ahmed (2002–03 to 2015–16)

== F ==
- Faisal Iqbal (Pakistan; 2009–10)
- Fakhrul Islam (2010–11)
- Farhad Reza (2009–10)
- Fariduddin (2009–10)

== G ==
- Gazi Salahuddin (2009–10)
- Golam Mabud (2001–02 to 2013)
- Golam Mawla (1999–2000 to 2008–09)
- Golam Mortaza (1999–2000 to 2006–07)
- Golam Rahman (2002–03 to 2012–13)

== H ==
- Hasibul Haque (2004–05)
- Hasibul Hossain (1994–95 to 2007–08)

== I ==
- Imran Ali (2013–14 to 2015–16)
- Imran Rahim (1999–2000 to 2002–03)
- Imtiaz Hossain (2001–02 to 2015–16)
- Iqbal Hossain (1999–2000 to 2000–01)

== J ==
- Jakwan Ahmed (2003–04 to 2005–06)
- Joy Roy (1999–2000 to 2001–02)
- Jumma Abbas (1999–2000 to 2003–04)

== K ==
- Kabir Ahmed (2001–02)
- Kazi Hasibul Haque (2004–05)
- Mohammad Kamrul Islam (2008–09)
- Khaled Ahmed (2015–16)
- Kuntal Chandra (2007–08)

== L ==
- Lablur Rahman (2008–09)

== M ==
- A. K. M. Mahmood (2000–01 to 2002–03)
- Maruf Reza (2006–07)
- Mashrafe Mortaza (2009–10)
- Masud Ahmed (2003–04)
- Mintu Das (1999–2000 to 2001–02)
- Mithun Ali (2006–07 to 2008–09)
- Mohammad Rafique (1999–2000 to 2000–01)
- Monir Hossain (2008–09)
- Monirul Islam (2005–06)
- Moniruzzaman (2004–05 to 2005–06)
- Mosharraf Hossain (2009–10)
- Mukammel Ali (2011–12 to 2013)
- Mushfiqur Rahim (2007–08 to 2008–09)
- Myshukur Rahaman (2009–10)

== N ==
- Nabil Samad (2003–04 to 2014–15)
- Nadif Chowdhury (2010–11 to 2011–12)
- Nasir Ahmed (2009–10)
- Nasir Hossain (2002–03 to 2010–11)
- Nasirul Alam (1994–95 to 2004–05)
- Nasum Ahmed (2010–11 to 2015–16)
- Nazmul Hossain (2004–05 to 2015–16)
- Nazmul Hossain Milon (2009–10 to 2015–16)
- Nazmus Sadat (2009–10)
- Nurul Hasan (2010–11)

== O ==
- Obaidullah (2000–01)

== P ==
- Paplu Dutta (2002–03)
- Parvez Ahmed (1999–2000 to 2004–05)

== R ==
- Rafiul Haque (2005–06)
- Rahatul Ferdous (2014–15 to 2015–16)
- Rajin Saleh (1999–2000 to 2015–16)
- Rana Miah (1999–2000 to 2007–08)
- Rasel Ahmed (2005–06)
- Rashedur Rahman (2006–07 to 2008–09)
- Rashid Hanif (2009–10)
- Rezaul Haque (2000–01 to 2009–10)
- Rinku Sarkar (2007–08)
- Rintu Roy (2001–02)
- Robiul Islam (2011–12)
- Rumman Ahmed (2009–10 to 2015–16)

== S ==
- Sadiqur Rahman (2003–04 to 2015–16)
- Saif Mahmud (2005–06 to 2007–08)
- Saikat Ali (2008–09 to 2010–11)
- Sajib Datta (2009–10)
- Sanjid Sami (2003–04)
- Sayem Alam (2009–10 to 2015–16)
- Shaker Ahmed (2010–11 to 2013–14)
- Shanaj Ahmed (2013–14 to 2015–16)
- Sharifullah (2007–08 to 2008–09)
- Sherhan Sharif (2006–07)
- Sirajullah Khadim (2004–05 to 2007–08)
- Subashis Roy (2007–08 to 2008–09)
- Sumon Saha (2008–09)

== T ==
- Tanveer Haider (2009–10 to 2010–11)
- Tapash Baisya (1999–2000 to 2012–13)
- Taposh Ghosh (2008–09)
- Taqrimul Hadi (1999–2000 to 2003–04)
- Tariqul Hassan (2001–02)
- Tasamul Haque (2010–11)

== W ==
- Kaushalya Weeraratne (Sri Lanka; 2009–10)

== Y ==
- Yasin Arafat (2010–11)

== Z ==
- Zakir Hasan (2015–16)
