= M. Ilias Ali =

Bangladeshi politician

- এম ইলিয়াস আলী
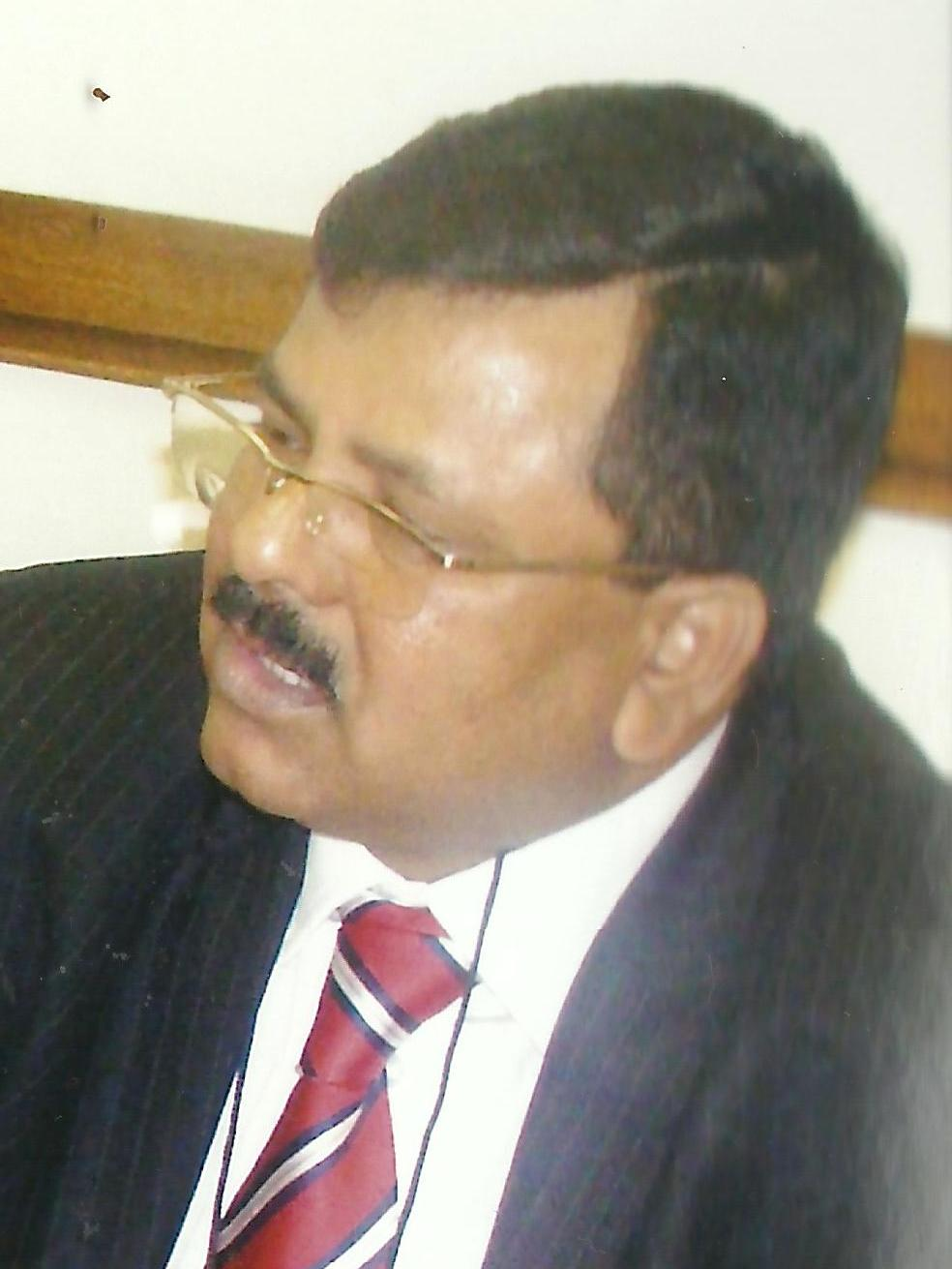
- Ali in 2011
- Born: 1 January 1961; Sylhet, Bangladesh
- Disappeared: April 17, 2012 (aged 51); Banani, Dhaka
- Citizenship: Bangladeshi
- Education: University of Dhaka
- Occupation: Politician
- Years active: 1975–2012
- Known for: Bengali nationalism
- Movement: Protest against Tipaimukh Dam
- Spouse: Tahsina Rushdir Luna
- Children: 3

Member of Parliament for Sylhet-2
- In office 15 February 1996 – June 1996
- Preceded by: Maqsood Ebne Aziz Lama
- Succeeded by: Shah Azizur Rahman
- In office 1 October 2001 – 29 October 2006
- Preceded by: Shah Azizur Rahman
- Succeeded by: Shafiqur Rahaman Chowdhury

Personal details
- Party: Bangladesh Nationalist Party

M. Ilias Ali (1 January 1961 – disappeared 17 April 2012) was a Bangladeshi politician and member of the Jatiya Sangsad (2001–2006) representing the Sylhet-2 constituency. He served as the organising secretary of the Bangladesh Nationalist Party.

He, along with his personal car driver, Ansar Ali, went missing on 18 April 2012. Later that day, local police recovered his abandoned car near his residence in Banani neighborhood and found Ansar's cellphone inside. They have not been seen since. On the tenth anniversary of his disappearance, Netra News, an independent news platform in Sweden, reported on 21 April 2022, that Rapid Action Battalion (RAB), an elite Bangladeshi police unit, had carried out the disappearance. The platform cited leaked confidential documents and internal investigations documents from RAB to reach the conclusion.

== Early life and education ==
M. Ilias Ali was born on 1 January 1961 at Ramdhana in Bishwanath Upazila of Sylhet district. As a child, he learned the Qur'an from his mother. He received his primary education from Ramdhana Government Primary School. He passed SSC in 1977 from Ramsundar Pilot High School in Biswanath upazila. In 1979, he passed HSC from Sylhet Government College. He obtained his B.Com (Hons) degree from the Department of Finance, University of Dhaka in 1985. He was a student of M.Com (Masters) Banking at the University of Dhaka, but was expelled from the university in 1987 for joining the student movement against the martial law of the then President Hussain Muhammad Ershad

== Political career ==
=== Student politics ===
Ali started his political career in 1980 with the student wing of the BNP, Jatiyatabadi Chhatra Dal, founded the year before. He lived in Kobi Joshim Uddin hall of Dhaka University. In a couple of years, he became leader of the dorm, and in 1983 became a central executive member of Jatiyatabadi Chhatra Dal (JCD).

In 1986, the National Council of JCD was held, where Ali was elected as the International Affairs Secretary of the Central Executive Committee.

Hossain Mohammad Ershad was elected as president in 1986, although BNP boycotted the election. While recognizing that Ershad had restored some political rights, BNP and the Awami League heightened political pressure to fully restore a parliamentary democracy in the country, and both had many students willing to protest for the cause. In 1987, Ershad ordered the expulsion of nine JCD student leaders from the Dhaka University, including Ali. He was arrested in 1988 for political activities. After seven months of prison, Ali was released from jail by the order of the Bangladesh Supreme Court. He was repeatedly arrested and released on bail.

In February 1990, Ali was arrested while JCD prepared for a protest march. After his arrest, violence increased on campus at Dhaka University, with conflict between students and police. In July 1990, Ali was released from jail by order of the Bangladesh Supreme Court. In the meantime, the anti-Ershad movement crossed party lines; its protests disrupted and slowed down the economy.

Ershad finally agreed to resign from his presidency in order that multi-party elections could be held again. On 6 December 1990 the recent Chief Justice Shahabuddin was appointed as Chief Advisor for a caretaker government. Ali and many of his colleagues were released from Dhaka Central jail.

In 1991, general elections were held, and the BNP took the majority. Khaleda Zia became prime minister. In 1992, the national council of JCD was held, and Ali was elected General Secretary of Jatiyotabadi Chhatra Dal.

=== General election ===
Ali was elected in 2001 to the 6th Parliament as a representative of the BNP. He hails from Bishwanath Upazila and represents Sylhet-2. He won by approximately 49,000 votes.

At the 5th national council of the BNP, on 8 December 2009, Ali spoke as president of Sylhet district. The councillors approved giving authority to Khaleda Zia, head of the party, to choose the leadership. Ali spoke in favor of promoting Tarique Rahman, the eldest son of Khaleda Zia, who is active in the BNP and is now second in power to his mother. On 1 January 2010, Ali was chosen as Organizing Secretary of the BNP.

=== Rivalry with Saifur Rahman ===
In 2005 and 2006, when the BNP controlled the government, a leadership conflict arose within the Sylhet BNP between Saifur Rahman, an MP who was serving as the Finance Minister under Khaleda Zia, and Ali, then a member of parliament. On 28 May 2005, BNP had suspended the Sylhet convening committee in the wake of discord between loyalists of the two leaders.

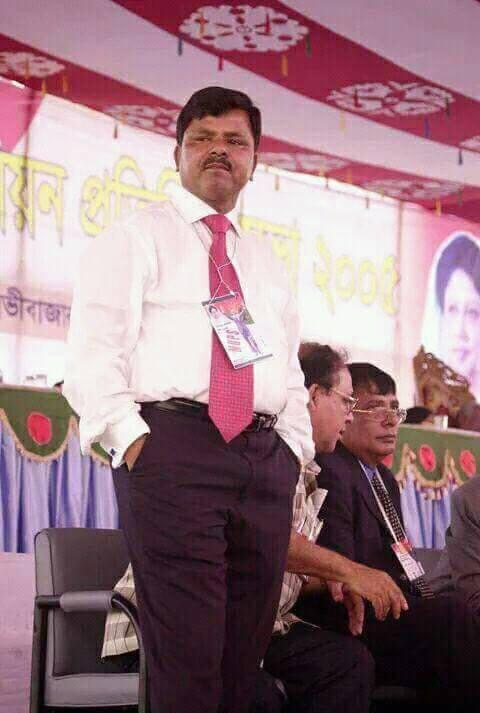
M Ilias Ali in 2005

The following year, relations were still strained. On 26 May 2006, some activists struck at Ali's residence in Sylhet following his reported unfavorable remarks about the finance minister. The rival sides clashed in the city next day. Ali's activists demonstrated, blaming the finance minister for the attack on their leader's house. Aggrieved, Saifur threatened to resign from the government unless action was taken against Ali and his loyalists. Reporters suggested he was trying to protect his own son's status in the BNP.

About Saifur's potential resignation in 2006, a BNP leader said,

The resignation threat was just a strategy to put pressure to ensure Ilyas Ali's expulsion. Saifur Rahman was worried about his son Naser Rahman's future in the party and considers Ilias an opponent in the district's party politics.

The prime minister was said to have been unhappy about the conflict between her party leaders.

To blunt the conflict, in June 2006 the BNP dissolved the Sylhet district convening committee, which Ali had led. The party sought to limit district competition among its politicians. All BNP MPs in Sylhet were advised they would have to take over their own organisational activities in their respective constituencies. BNP leaders would handle it for areas that did not have party MPs at the time.

In response to a press inquiry, Ali said he had talks with the BNP chairperson on organizational matters in Sylhet district. He declined to comment on the discord with Saifur. Khaleda Zia and other senior leaders of the party talked with both men and did not expel Ali.

On 9 December 2006, Ali was shot at by unidentified gunmen while in his Jeep in front of the Osmaninagar Police station, after returning from an election campaign meeting in his constituency. He was unhurt but the vehicle was damaged. After this incident, his supporters quickly blocked the highway for a time. Ali said he thought the attack was made by Awami League supporters. He filed a criminal case, but no investigation took place.

== 2007 corruption charges ==
Following the resignation of the BNP government at its end of term in late October 2006, there were political protests and violence. In accordance with the constitution, a caretaker government (CTG) was established to manage the general elections to be held within 90 days. In early January, the Awami League and its allies withdrew from the election. On 11 January 2007, President Iajuddin Ahmed, Chief Advisor of the CTG, imposed a state of emergency. He was backed by the military, which wanted to restore stability.

The interim government selected Fakhruddin Ahmed, a prominent banker who had worked with the World Bank, as Chief Advisor following the resignation of Iajuddin Ahmed. Ahmed continued as president, which under the CTG included the Defense Ministry. Having vowed to clean up corruption, in the spring of 2007 the caretaker government filed charges against 160 persons, including Tarique Rahman, the BNP Senior Joint Secretary General, his brother Arafat Rahman, and their mother Khaleda Zia, the former prime minister, as well as many other politicians, civil servants and businessmen. Later that year, the government filed corruption and murder charges against Sheikh Hasina, head of the Awami League and also a former prime minister.

Ali was among those charged with corruption. On 10 August 2008, Ali got anticipatory bail from the High Court related to an extortion charge in another case.

== 2008 election/change of government ==
Biswanath police in Sylhet filed charges against Ilias Ali and nearly 50 local BNP leaders, for obstructing them as the police seized scattered ballot papers the day after the 29 December election. On 19 January 2010, Ali and 42 others got anticipatory bail from the High Court. It ordered the government to show cause within four weeks as to why the petitioners should not be granted permanent bail in this case.

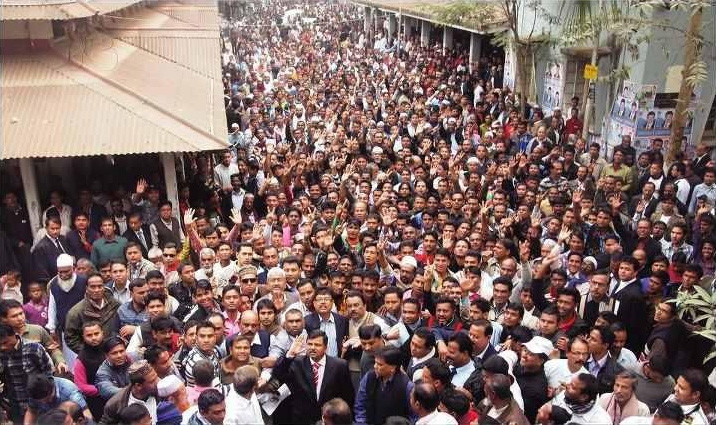
Ali outside court after getting bail

In January 2009, the Awami League government filed charges of conspiracy against Ilias Ali and 250 BNP members. He accused the government of harassment and attempting to repress the opposition. In December 2011 the government filed six cases against him.

== Opposition activities ==
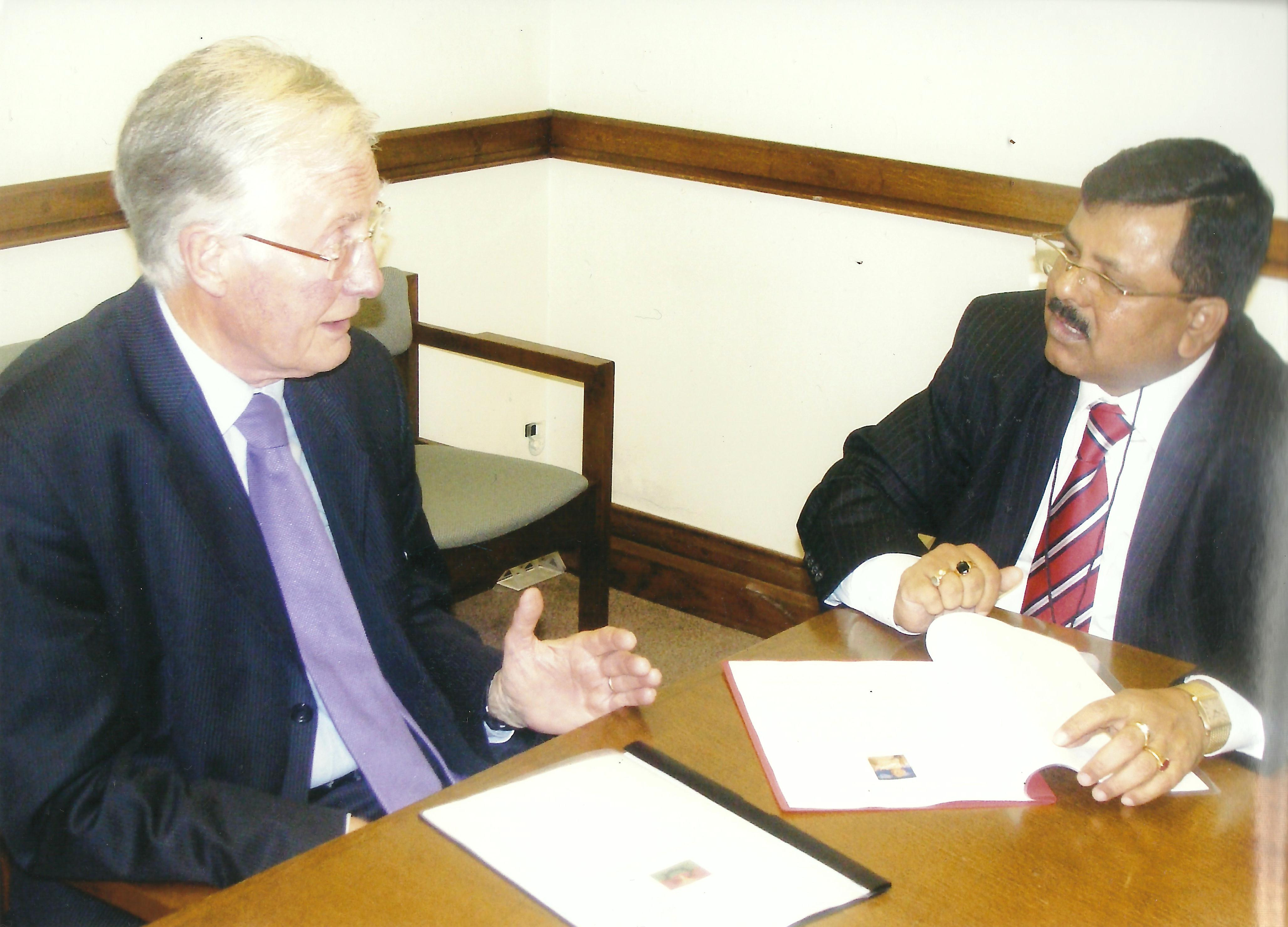
British MP Michael Meacher and Ali in 2011

=== Long March ===
As Organizing Secretary, Ali had major responsibilities for the "Long March," announced for 1 October 2011 by Khaleda Zia as a protest against the government's progress in a joint land survey and resolution of issues with long-disputed lands along the Sylhet-Meghalaya and Sylhet-Assam borders to India. As a result of the survey, Bangladesh ceded more than 200 acres in this area.

At the end of the Long March, there was a rally of Lacs (100 thousand) people at the Madrasa. In addition to Khaleda Zia, Ilias Ali and Mahmudur Rahman, editor of Amar Desh and former BNP energy advisor, were speakers. Ali spoke about resisting changes to land tenure in the border area.

Since the survey had been done, local residents complained that they were being barred from ploughing croplands and fishing on the Jaintapur and Gowainghat borders. Two Bangladeshis were shot dead and at least 20 others injured in clashes in 2011 in the two months preceding the Long March. Locals under the forum 'Amra Simantabashi' (We are the border people) have been raising protest against the survey. The forum is mainly dominated by the political opposition leaders of the region.

In preparation for the Long March, Ali arranged for a grand rally at Sylhet Aliyah Madrasha. He had leaflets describing the event printed and distributed in Sylhet and the key areas of Bondor Bazar, Court Point, Zindabazar, Amborkhana and others.

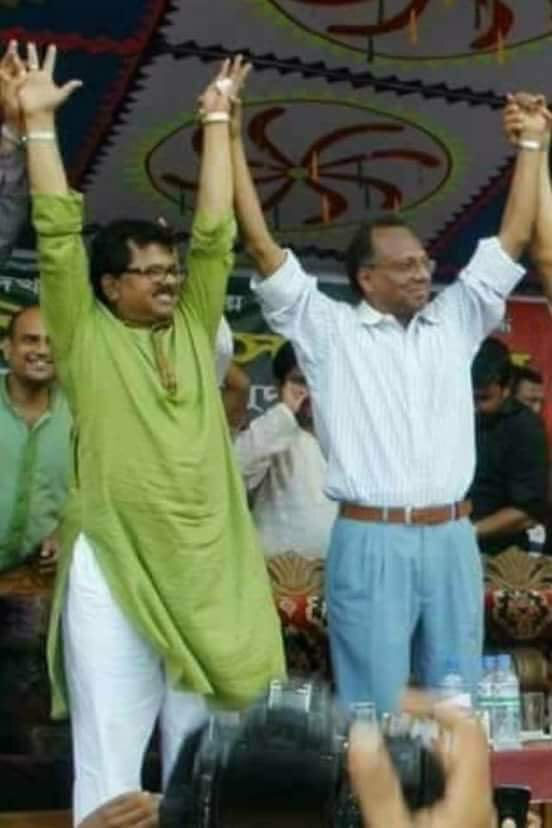
M Ilias Ali & Mahmudur Rahman in 2011

During the Long March, Khaleda Zia traveled through a total of six districts, stopping to speak to crowds at public and street rallies. On 11 October, a rally was scheduled at Aliya Madrasha field. Thousands of people had gathered in the city; estimates were that it was the biggest rally in the city since the Awami League had assumed office in January 2009. Four-Party Alliance supporters gathered from several districts.

=== Protest against Tipaimukh Dam ===
The BNP was concerned about India's construction of the Tipaimukh Dam on the Barak River, which enters northeastern Bangladesh at Amalshid in Zakigonj. They believe it will have adverse effects in the region and contribute to desertification. The dam was planned decades ago, but resistance has developed against the project.

In late 2011, Ali organized a day-long hartal (strike) and protests in the Sylhet district on 1 December to protest the Indian project. His programme also included mass rallies over several days, with participation by the BNP student group, Jatiyatabadi Chhatra Dal (JCD), as well as a rally and procession by Jatiyatabadi Shechhasebak Dal, and other front organizations. He urged all political parties to protest the Indian project. He said that, if the dam were not stopped, the protest movement would continue. The strike and protests proceeded without violent incident. Ali announced the BNP would stage other events, such as a human chain, hunger strike and grand rally at Amalshid, where the Barak River enters Bangladesh.

== Disappearance ==
On 17 April 2012, Ali disappeared after last being seen in Dhaka at midnight with his driver. His private car was found by police near his Dhaka home, but the two men remain missing since. No groups took credit for his disappearance, nor was a ransom asked for.

BNP announced plans for a hartal (general strike) in Sylhet in protest. The police said that BNP supporters had barricaded roads of the district and they were being called in. BNP members have also clashed with police in protests in Dhaka since his disappearance, where more than 30 people have been injured. By 22 April, conflicts had taken place especially in Sylhet and Dhaka; demonstrations and protests had also occurred elsewhere. BNP supporters led day-long hartals (strikes) for three consecutive days on 23, 24 and 25 April in the week following Ali's disappearance. Based on a petition from Ali's wife, ten government security agencies had to respond to the High Court's demands to produce Ali within 10 days; two had responded within the deadline, saying they did not have him nor know of his whereabouts, and the remainder were expected to say the same. By early May, five people died and scores were injured in the first several days of protests by the opposition. Bombs were set off in Dhaka. As a result, the government charged 44 top opposition leaders for not controlling the violence.

On 17 April 2012, at 1:30 AM, Ilias Ali and his driver Ansar Ali were abducted in front of South Point School and College on Road No. 2 in Banani, a neighbourhood in Dhaka, Bangladesh.

Khaleda Zia alleged that the Awami League government was responsible, which it denied. Observers worry that a campaign of intimidation against the opposition is being waged by security forces, including the Rapid Action Battalion paramilitary unit, established in 2004 under the BNP government, and local police, to benefit the government of Sheikh Hasina.

Ali was among a series of politicians who had disappeared: in 2012 there had been 22 already, according to Ain o Salish Kendra, a human rights organization, and 51 went missing in 2011.

According to the leaked documents obtained by Netra News, RAB-1 conducted an investigation revealing that the abduction was a meticulously planned mission carried out by RAB's intelligence wing. Investigators traced the operation through mobile phone records, identifying suspicious activity involving eight CityCell numbers used during the abduction. The investigation suggested that three coordinated teams were involved: one to carry out the abduction, another to trail Ali, and a third providing surveillance support from the National Monitoring Centre (NMC) at DGFI headquarters. The entry and exit logs at DGFI linked two RAB intelligence officers, Captain Tauhidul Islam and Captain Monjurul Hasan, to the operation, though both denied involvement when contacted by Netra News. Further suspicions were raised by abrupt changes in RAB's surveillance of Ilias Ali's mobile numbers just before and after his disappearance. Allegations also implicated Brigadier General Ziaul Ahsan, then-chief of RAB's intelligence wing, in orchestrating the abduction. Despite these findings, both RAB and DGFI denied the allegations, dismissing the documents and claims as fabricated. In August 2024, few days after the resignation of Sheikh Hasina, a Sub-Inspector of the Bangladesh Police, Masud Rana, released a video through Protidiner Bangladesh on YouTube. In the video, he alleged that Ilias Ali was killed by police several years ago, detailing that he was suffocated with a polythene bag, repeatedly stabbed, and then drowned in the Bay of Bengal near Patenga Beach.

== Personal life ==
Ali is married to Tahsina Rushdir Luna, a deputy registrar at the University of Dhaka. They have two sons and a daughter. M Abrar Ilias is a Barrister, who graduated from the City, University of London, and M Labib Sharar graduated from The London School of Economics and Political Science and is a qualified ICAEW Chartered Accountant. Rushdir sought nomination from BNP to compete in the 2018 Bangladeshi general election representing the Sylhet-2 constituency. However, she was controversially barred from competing in the 2018 General Elections by the Awami League government.

== See also ==
- Disappearance of Ilias Ali
- Forced disappearance in Bangladesh
- Anti-Indian sentiment
- Indian influence in Bangladesh
- List of people who disappeared mysteriously: post-1970
