= List of works written in Sylheti Nagri =

This is a list of puthis written in the historic Sylheti Nagri script. This does not include works dating after the late 20th century.

== 1600s ==
- Bhedsar (ভেদসার) by Syed Shah Husayn Alam

== 1700s ==
- Talib Husan (তালিব হুছন) by Ghulam Husan (1774, Silchar)

== 1800s ==
- Ghafil Nasihat (গাফিল নছিহত) by Azmat Ali (1843, Umairgaon, Sylhet)
- Halat-un-Nabi (হালতুন্নবী) by Sadeq Ali (1855, Daulatpur, Longla)
- Kitab Radd-e-Kufr (কেতাব রদ্দে কুফুর) by Sadeq Ali (1874, Sylhet)
- Saheeh Sohor Chorit (ছহী সহর চরিত) by Asad (1878, Sylhet)
- Shitalong Faqir-er Rag (শিতালং ফকিরের রাগ) by Muhammad Salimullah, aka Shitalong Shah (Kazidahar, Sonai)
- Puthi Dafeh al-Hujat (পুঁথি দফেউল হুজত) by Sadeq Ali
- Pandenama (পান্দেনামা) by Sadeq Ali
- Hashor Michhil (হাশর মিছিল) by Sadeq Ali
- Hushiarnama (হুঁশিয়ারনামা) by Sadeq Ali
- Ozu-Namaz (অজু-নমাজ) by Munshi Abdul Karim
- Kalam Darbesh (কালাম দরবেশ)
- Asol Kitab Mohabbatnama (আসল কেতাব মহবতনামা) by Sadeq Ali
- Kitab Saheeh Sadsi Mas'ala o 130 Faraz (কেতাব ছহি ছদছি মছলা ও ১৩০ ফরজ) by Munshi Abdul Karim (1890, Sylhet)
- Shahadat-e-Buzurgan (শাহাদতে বুজুর্গান) by Mozir Uddin Ahmed (Atuwajan, Saidpur, Sunamganj)

== 1900s ==
- Wajib al-Amal (ওয়াজিবুল আমল) by 'Abd al-Karim of Jaintiapur (1905, Calcutta)
- Kitab Nur-najat - Dar Ishq-e-Marefat (কেতাব নুরনাজাত - দর এস্কে মারেফত) by Zuhur al-Husayn (1907, Sylhet)
- Mujma Rag Haribangsha (মুজমা রাগ হরিবংশ) by Muhammad Afzal (1907, Sylhet)
- Mufid al-Mumineen: Volume 1 (মুফীদুল মুমিনীন) by Munshi Irfan Ali (1910, Sylhet)
- Puthi Apai Nama (পুঁথি আপাই নামা) by Munshi Sajid Miya (1913, Sylhet))
- Ahwal-e-Zamana (আহওয়ালে জমানা) by Muhammad Haidar Chaudhuri (1913, Sylhet)
- Hajjnama (হজনামা) by Sriyukta Saha Abdullah (1913, Sylhet)
- Ahkam al-Islam (আহকামুল ইছলাম) by Munshi Muhammad Husan (1913, Sylhet)
- Kitab Ganj-e-Ishq-e-Ilahi (কেতাব গঞ্জে এস্কে এলাহি) by Munshi Abdul Aziz (1916, Sylhet)
- Waqf-e-Islamia Puthi (অকফে ইসলামিয়া পুঁথি) by Unknown (1916, Dhalai)
- Saheeh Wasitunnabi (ছহি অছিতুন্নবী) by Munshi Zafar Ali (1920, Sylhet)
- Charkar Fazilat (চরকার ফজিলত) by Muhammad Sikandar Ali (1921, Sylhet)
- Ahkam-e-Charka (আহকামে চরকা) by Moulvi Akbar Ali (1922, Sylhet)
- Zulmat Nama Kobita (জুলমাত নামা কবিতা) by Munshi Mushahid Ali (1924, Silchar)
- Rag Wajid Nasihat (রাগ ওয়াজিদ নছিহত) by Moulvi Surukh Miya Choudhury (1924, Sylhet)
- Saheeh Mufid al-Awam (ছহি মুফিদুল আওয়াম) by Munshi Abdul Aziz (1925, Sylhet)
- Shat Konna-r Bakhan (সাত কন্যার বাখান) by Saha Noor (1925, Sylhet)
- Shonabhan-er Puthi (সোনাভানের পুঁথি) by Abdul Karim (1925, Sylhet)
- Korinama (কড়িনামা) by Unknown (1927, Sylhet)
- Isar al-Haqq (ইছারুল হক) by Faqir Haji Asan Shah (1927–28, Sylhet)
- Ahkam-e-Roza (আহকামে রোজা) by Moulvi Faiyaz Ali (1929, Sylhet)
- Horin Nama (হরিণ নামা) (1929, Sylhet)
- Sylhet Nagri Pohela Kitab O Doikhura-r Rag (সিলেট নাগরী পহেলা কিতাব ও দইখুরার রাগ) by Muhammad Abdul Latif (1929, Sylhet)
- Europiyo Mohajuddher Kobita Volume 2 (ইউরোপীয় মহাযুদ্ধের কবিতা) by Abdul Wahid al-Adiri al-Hanafi (1950)

== Unknown ==
- Jongonama by Wahid Ali
- Surman Ali Khalifa-r Gaan by Surman Ali
- Shahid-e-Karbala
- Ebadat-e-Magaz
- Spiritual Songs on Love and Separation
- Hormuz Ali-r Gaan by Shah Hormuz Ali
- Baram Zohura
- Bayan Qayamatnama
- Chandramukhi-r Punthi
- Imamsurir Bayan
- Hormuz Nasihat

== See also ==
- History of Sylhet
- List of Sylhetis
- Sylhet region
- Sylheti language
