= Disappearance of Ilias Ali =

2012 disappearance of Bangladeshi former Member of Parliament and opposition leader

Ilias Ali
- Born: 1 January 1961; Bishwanath, Sylhet, Bangladesh
- Disappeared: 17 April 2012 (aged 41); Banani, Dhaka, Bangladesh
- Status: Missing for 14 years, 4 months and 14 days
- Education: University of Dhaka
- Known for: Member of Parliament; Opposition leader Missing person

The disappearance of Ilias Ali is a high-profile incident in Bangladesh that took place in 2012. Ilias Ali, a former Member of Parliament and the organising secretary of the then-main opposition party Bangladesh Nationalist Party. He along with his driver Ansar Ali, was reportedly abducted from Banani neighbourhood, Dhaka, by individuals claiming to be from law enforcement agencies. In the following days, at least five of his party men died and many were injured as they observed strikes and demonstration programmes in protest of his disappearance. The incident got much media coverage.

BNP Chairperson Begum Khaleda Zia accused the Awami League government of being responsible, a claim the government denied. Observers express concern that security forces, including the Rapid Action Battalion (RAB)—a paramilitary unit established in 2004 under the BNP government—and local police, are engaged in a campaign of intimidation against the opposition to benefit Sheikh Hasina's government.

== Place and Time ==
On 17 April 2012, at 1:30 AM BST, Ilias Ali and his driver Ansar Ali were abducted in front of South Point School and College on Road No. 2 in Banani, a neighbourhood in Dhaka, Bangladesh.

== Background ==
In 1999, the Government of India proposed the construction of the Tipaimukh Dam on the Barak River in the Sipuikawn (Tipaimukh) area of Manipur State. After its approval, a controversy arose over it in Bangladesh. Bangladeshi experts have said the massive dam will disrupt the seasonal rhythm of the river and have an adverse effect on downstream agriculture and fisheries. Later, in 2009, concerns arose among the people of the greater Sylhet region in northeastern Bangladesh that the first impact of the proposed Tipaimukh Dam would be felt there. This led to local protests in Sylhet. Various organizations from Dhaka joined the movement and organized large-scale actions such as long marches. Additionally, the Sylhet Division Development Struggle Council organized a three-day long march. The BNP-led four-party alliance also organized programs including long marches, boat marches, and hunger strikes in the area. Ilias Ali was one of the key organizers of the movement against the construction of the Tipaimukh Dam in Sylhet and a staunch critic of the project. Approximately four months before his disappearance, in December 2011, during an interview with Banglanews24.com, he alleged that a conspiracy was being plotted against him for his leadership in the anti-Tipaimukh Dam movement in Sylhet. He stated, "It was under my leadership that the movement against the Tipaimukh Dam in Sylhet's upstream began. Earlier, I led a long march in the border areas of Bangladesh with Mahmudur Rahman, the editor of Amar Desh. I have always been uncompromising against all conspiracies, including the stock market scandal, economic collapse, and the selling out of the country to India by this government. That is why various cases are being filed against me to take me down." In May 2023, general secretary of BNP Mirza Fakhrul Islam Alamgir made a similar allegation, stating, "Ilias Ali was possibly abducted because of his involvement in the movement against the Tipaimukh Dam." On 17 April 2024, on a press conference held at the BNP's central office in Naya Paltan to mark the 12th anniversary of Ilias Ali's disappearance, the party's senior joint general secretary Ruhul Kabir Rizvi, made a similar allegation. He stated, "Ilias Ali became a major target for the state apparatus and domestic and foreign forces due to his uncompromising struggle against the government and his leadership in the mass movement in Sylhet protesting the Tipaimukh Dam and border aggression. Ilias Ali stood against imperialism. The government, envious of his popularity and organizational skills, failed to confront him politically and has kept him disappeared."

== Disappearance ==
Tahsina Rushdir Luna, wife of Ilias Ali, in describing her husband's disappearance to Netra News:

When he (Ilias Ali) was returning home, several armed plainclothes individuals, who had arrived at the scene on two white microbuses, blockaded his car and forcibly captured him and his driver Ansar Ali.

On 17 April 2012, Ilias Ali returned to Dhaka from Sylhet. Later that evening, he left his home again with the same car. That night, after meeting with supporters at Hotel Sheraton (now InterContinental), he mysteriously disappeared along with his personal driver, Ansar Ali, on his way back home from Banani Road No. 2 in Dhaka. The Officer-in-Charge of Banani Police Station, Mamun Ar Rashid, reported that they found an abandoned car in the Mohakhali, Dhaka around midnight. Upon bringing the car to the police station and examining the documents, they discovered it was the vehicle belonging to prominent BNP leader Ilias Ali.

== Investigation ==
The day after Ilias Ali went missing, on 18 April, his wife Tahsina Rushdir Luna filed a writ petition in the High Court seeking his return. The following day, on 19 April, in response to the petition, the High Court issued a rule asking law enforcement agencies to explain his disappearance within 10 days. In May 2012, five law enforcement agencies submitted separate reports to the High Court. The reports from the Inspector General of Police (IGP), RAB, CID, Special Branch (SB), and Banani Police Station claimed that they were doing everything possible to locate Ilias Ali. The Attorney General's office later informed The Daily Star that the agencies, in their respective reports, asserted that BNP leader Ilias Ali was not in their custody and that they had neither detained nor apprehended him.

Following his disappearance, joint operations were conducted by RAB and police in various locations, including Pubail in Gazipur, but Ilias Ali was not found. At one point, the court ordered Banani Police Station to investigate his disappearance and submit regular investigation reports. Kazi Mainul Islam, the Inspector (Investigation) of Banani Police Station, reported that since the court's directive, they had submitted 25 reports up until 17 April 2013.

== Reactions ==
=== Domestic ===
After news of Ilias Ali's disappearance spread, tensions flared across the country, particularly in his home district of Sylhet. From 18 April, a five-day nationwide hartal (general strike) and a six-day hartal in Sylhet were observed. In response, a political organisation named Ilias Mukti Sangram Parishad (Ilias Freedom Struggle Council) was formed in Sylhet.

Violence erupted across the country. In Bishwanath, Sylhet, Ilias Ali's birthplace, a protest demanding his return led to a three-way clash occurred between the police, Awami League, and BNP supporters. This led to the deaths of Monowar Hossain, a Jubo Dal leader, Selim Ahmed, a Chhatra Dal leader, and Zakir Hossain, a rickshaw puller and BNP supporter, who were shot dead during the conflict.

On 18 April, in Bishwanath, Sylhet, clashes erupted between police and protesters, resulting in over 20 injuries and several individuals were arrested. On 23 April, protesters escalated their actions by attacking the Bishwanath Upazila Parishad, leading to further clashes, vandalism, and arson. As a result, the Ministry of Local Government, Rural Development, and Co-operatives ordered the temporary suspension of the chairmen of seven Union Parishad of Bishwanath Upazila, as they were named in the charges related to the incident.

Following this, on 2 July, the Upazila Nirbahi Officer carried out the suspension of all seven UP chairmen simultaneously.

During the protests over Ilias Ali's disappearance, many senior BNP leaders, including the then-Acting Secretary General Mirza Fakhrul Islam Alamgir, were imprisoned.

Three organisations expressed concern over the disappearance of BNP leader Ilias Ali and his driver, calling for a proper investigation. The Ain o Salish Kendra (ASK) stated that ongoing disappearances and secret killings threaten human rights and democratic progress. They demanded investigations into all such incidents, including Ali's case, to hold those responsible accountable. The Revolutionary Workers Party of Bangladesh and Jatiya Party (JP) also urged authorities to quickly locate Ali and his driver.

On 18 April 2012, in response to Ilias Ali's disappearance, the BNP sent letters to then-UN Secretary-General Ban Ki-moon at the United Nations headquarters in New York and to United States Secretary of State Hillary Clinton at the U.S. State Department.

The party also sent a letter to Joe Crowley, the co-chairman of the Bangladesh Caucus and an influential U.S. Congressman.

=== International ===
The international human rights organisation Amnesty International expressed concern over the enforced disappearance of Ilias Ali, a prominent opposition leader, as well as the broader issue of extrajudicial killings in Bangladesh. Amnesty International called on the Bangladesh government to conduct an independent investigation into the recent disappearances of several individuals, including Ilias Ali, and the deaths of protesters during subsequent clashes. They suggested that security forces, particularly the Rapid Action Battalion (RAB), might be involved in these disappearances. Amnesty International urged the government to hold those responsible for the disappearances and killings accountable.

Human Rights Watch (HRW) also voiced deep concern over the disappearance of Ilias Ali and his driver. They highlighted the increasing number of enforced disappearances of opposition leaders and political activists in Bangladesh, calling on the government to immediately initiate an independent and impartial investigation. HRW also demanded an independent investigation into the excessive use of force against protesters following Ilias Ali's disappearance.

Additionally, the Parliament of the United Kingdom held a debate on the disappearance of Ilias Ali, where speakers expressed deep concern over recent cases of extrajudicial killings and enforced disappearances in Bangladesh, including Ilias Ali's case.

Former U.S. Secretary of State Hillary Clinton has expressed concern about the disappearance of BNP leader Ilias Ali and the killing of a labour-rights activist leader Aminul Islam, and called for thorough and independent probe into the incidents during a state visit to Bangladesh in 2012.

== Bibliography ==
- Islam, Md Saidul; Islam, Md Nazrul (2016), ""Environmentalism of the poor": the Tipaimukh Dam, ecological disasters and environmental resistance beyond borders", Bandung Journal of Global South, 3 (27): 1–16, doi:10.1186/s40728-016-0030-5
- Thakur, Jaya (January 2020), India-Bangladesh Trans-Boundary River Management: Understanding the Tipaimukh Dam Controversy, Observer Research Foundation
