= Shafiqur Rahaman Chowdhury =

Bangladeshi politician (born 1957)

Shofiqur Rahman Choudhury
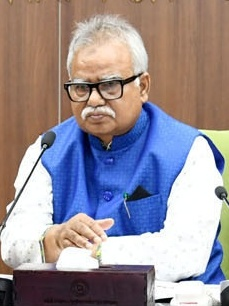
- Chowdhury in 2024

Minister of State for Expatriates' Welfare and Overseas Employment
- In office 11 January 2024 – 6 August 2024
- Prime Minister: Sheikh Hasina
- Succeeded by: Nurul Haque Nur

Member of the Bangladesh Parliament for Sylhet-2
- In office 30 January 2024 – 6 August 2024
- Preceded by: Mokabbir Khan
- In office 29 December 2008 – 5 January 2014
- Preceded by: Ilias Ali
- Succeeded by: Yahya Chowdhury

Personal details
- Born: 18 August 1957 (age 68)
- Party: Bangladesh Awami League

Shofiqur Rahman Choudhury (born 18 August 1957) is a Bangladesh Awami League politician and a former Jatiya Sangsad member representing the Sylhet-2 constituency.

== Career ==
Chowdhury was elected to parliament from Sylhet-2 as a Bangladesh Awami League candidate in 2008. He resided in the United States and returned to Bangladesh for the election.
