= Tahsina Rushdir Luna =

Bangladeshi politician (born 1966)

- তাহসিনা রুশদীর লুনা

Member of the Bangladesh Parliament for Sylhet-2
- Incumbent
- Assumed office 17 February 2026
- Preceded by: Shafiqur Rahaman Chowdhury

Personal details
- Born: 31 December 1966 (age 59) Sylhet District, East Pakistan
- Party: Bangladesh Nationalist Party
- Spouse: M Ilias Ali
- Occupation: Politician

Tahsina Rushdir Luna (born 31 December 1966) is a Bangladeshi politician who was elected as a member of parliament for the Sylhet-2 constituency as a candidate of the Bangladesh Nationalist Party with the party symbol Sheaf of Paddy in the 2026 Bangladeshi general election for the first time. She is the first-ever female member of parliament from the Sylhet Division.

== See also ==
- List of members of the 13th Jatiya Sangsad
- Disappearance of Ilias Ali
