= Baridhara =

Upscale Residential Area in Dhaka

Coordinates: 23.8029°N 90.4201°E

Baridhara বারিধারা
- Neighbourhood
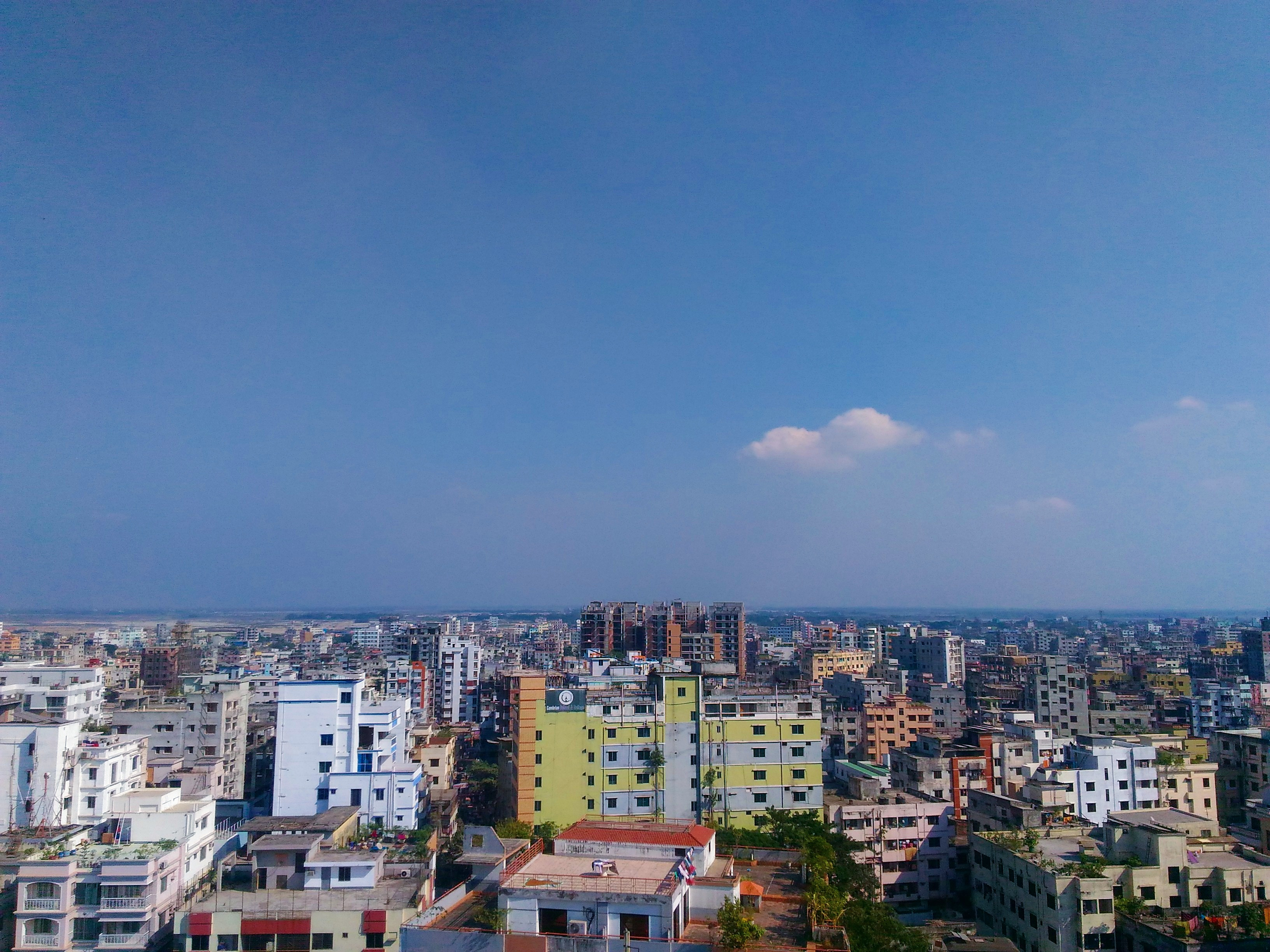
- Skyline of Baridhara J Block
- Interactive map of Baridhara
- Country: Bangladesh
- Division: Dhaka
- District: Dhaka
- Time zone: UTC+06:00 (BST)

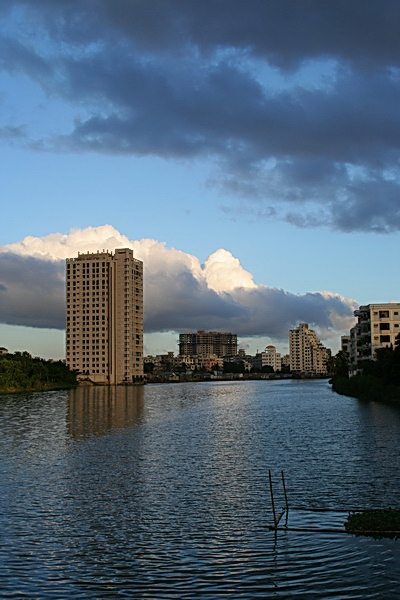
Baridhara Lake in 2006

Baridhara (Bengali: বারিধারা) is an upscale residential area in Dhaka, Bangladesh. It is located on the east of and northeast of Gulshan across Gulshan-Baridhara Lake. It has special zones designated for diplomats, and many of the city's foreign embassies and high commissions are situated here. There are mainly three areas: a diplomatic zone in the southwest portion, a general residential area in the eastern portion, and an adjacent DOHS area in the northeast portion.

== Etymology ==
The name derives from the Bengali words "bāri" (বারি; "water") and "dhārā" (ধারা; "flow"), literally meaning "stream of water".

== Economy ==
US-Bangla Airlines has its headquarters in the Baridhara Diplomatic Zone.

== Education ==
University of Information Technology and Sciences, the Japanese School Dhaka, the French International School of Dhaka, South Point School and College and the American International School of Dhaka are located in Baridhara.

== Notable residents ==
- Jamal Uddin Ahmad, Deputy Prime Minister of Bangladesh 1977–1982
- Hussain Muhammad Ershad, former president of Bangladesh and military dictator
- Shabnam, Bangladeshi actress
- Shahnaz Rahmatullah, Bangladeshi singer

== Embassies ==
- Embassy of the Islamic Republic of Afghanistan
- Royal Bhutanese Embassy
- High Commission of Brunei Darussalam
- High Commission of Canada
- Embassy of the People's Republic of China
- Embassy of France
- Embassy of the Federal Republic of Germany
- Apostolic Nunciature of the Holy See
- High Commission of India
- Embassy of Japan
- Embassy of the Republic of Korea
- High Commission of Malaysia
- Embassy of the Republic of Maldives
- Embassy of Morocco
- Embassy of Myanmar
- Embassy of Nepal
- Royal Norwegian Embassy
- Embassy of the State of Palestine
- Philippine Embassy in Bangladesh
- Royal Thai Embassy
- Embassy of the Republic of Turkey
- Embassy of the United States of America
