= Shah Azizur Rahman (politician) =

Bangladeshi politician (died 2018)

- শাহ আজিজুর রহমান

Member of Parliament for Sylhet-2
- In office 14 July 1996 – 28 October 2001
- Preceded by: Maqsood Ebne Aziz Lama
- Succeeded by: Ilias Ali

Personal details
- Born: c. 1930s Umarpur Union, Balaganj, Sylhet District, Assam Province, British Raj
- Died: 17 September 2018 (aged 80) Parkview Hospital, Sylhet, Bangladesh
- Resting place: Osmani Nagar Upazila
- Party: Awami League

Shah Azizur Rahman (died 17 September 2018) was a Bangladesh Awami League politician and a Jatiya Sangsad member from the Sylhet-2 constituency.

== Early life and education ==
Rahman was born in his ancestral home in Umarpur Union of present-day Osmani Nagar Upazila, Sylhet District, Bangladesh.

== Career ==
Rahman was elected to the parliament in July 1996 from Sylhet-2 as a Bangladesh Awami League candidate. Earlier, he was chairman of Balaganj Upazila Parishad.
