= American International School Dhaka =

Location
- 12 United Nations Road, Baridhara, Dhaka; Bangladesh; 23.8008°N 90.4192°E

Information
- Other name: AISD
- Type: Day School, private
- Motto: Discimus agere agendo
- Established: 1972
- Faculty: 80
- Grades: Pre-Kindergarten - Grade 12
- Enrollment: 500
- Affiliation: The New England Association of Schools
- Website: aisdhaka.org

The American International School Dhaka (AISD) is a not-for-profit, international, independent, and co-educational day school located in Baridhara, Dhaka, Bangladesh, serving students of all nationalities in pre-kindergarten through grade 12.

== History ==
Dacca American Society School 1960

In 1956, employees of the US Government that who working overseas sought to form a school for their children. So they started the Dacca American Society School in Dhanmondi, which was part of East Pakistan at the time. During the Liberation War in 1971, the school closed down. After Bangladesh won their independence, the school was reopened in 1972 and renamed the American International School Dhaka.
