= Sylhet-2 =

Constituency of Bangladesh's Jatiya Sangsad

Coordinates: 24.65°N 91.82°E

- Constituency for the Jatiya Sangsad
- District: Sylhet District
- Division: Sylhet Division
- Electorate: 368,932 (2026)

Current constituency
- Created: 1973
- Party: Bangladesh Nationalist Party
- Member: Tahsina Rushdir Luna
- ← 229 Sylhet-1 231 Sylhet-3 →

Sylhet-2 is a constituency represented in the Jatiya Sangsad (National Parliament) of Bangladesh since 2026 by Tahsina Rushdir Luna of the Bangladesh Nationalist Party.

== Boundaries ==
The constituency encompasses Bishwanath and Osmani Nagar upazilas.

== History ==
The constituency was created for the first general elections in newly independent Bangladesh, held in 1973.

Ahead of the 2008 general election, the Election Commission redrew constituency boundaries to reflect population changes revealed by the 2001 Bangladesh census. The 2008 redistricting altered the boundaries of the constituency.

Ahead of the 2018 general election, the Election Commission altered the boundaries of the constituency. Previously it included three union parishads of Balaganj Upazila: Dewan Bazar, Paschim Gauripur, and Purba Gauripur, but did not include Osmani Nagar Upazila.

== Members of Parliament ==
Election	Member	Party
1973	Abdus Samad Azad	Awami League
1979	Suranjit Sengupta	Jatiya Ekata Party
Major Boundary Changes
1986	Enamul Haque Chowdhury	Jatiya Party
1988	Maqsood Ebne Aziz Lama	Jatiya Party
1991	Maqsood Ebne Aziz Lama	Jatiya Party
Feb 1996	Ilias Ali	Bangladesh Nationalist Party
Jun 1996	Shah Azizur Rahman	Awami League
2001	Ilias Ali	Bangladesh Nationalist Party
2008	Shafiqur Rahaman Chowdhury	Awami League
2014	Yahya Chowdhury	Jatiya Party (Ershad)
2018	Mokabbir Khan	Gano Forum
2024	Shafiqur Rahaman Chowdhury	Awami League
2026	Tahsina Rushdir Luna	Bangladesh Nationalist Party

== Elections ==
=== Elections in the 2020s ===
General Election 2026: Sylhet-2 (Note: The vote counts given by The Business Standard are incomplete. It also lists a sixth candidate, independent Mostakim Raja Chowdhury, but that is likely a data entry error. He was a candidate for Sylhet-3.)
Party	Candidate	Votes	%	±%
BNP	Tahsina Rushdir Luna	117,956	73.7	N/A
Khelafat Majlis	Muhammad Muntasir Ali	38,635	24.1	N/A
JP(E)	Mahbubur Rahman Chowdhury	1,420	0.9	N/A
IAB	Md. Amir Uddin	1,408	0.9	N/A
Gano Forum	Md. Mujibul Huq	637	0.4	N/A
Majority		79,321	49.6	N/A
Turnout		160,056	43.4	N/A
Registered electors		368,932		
BNP gain from AL				

=== Elections in the 2010s ===
General Election 2018: Sylhet-2
Party	Symbol	Candidate	Votes	%	±pp
Gano Forum	Rising sun	Mokabbir Khan	69,420	46.85	N/A
Independent	Green coconut	Muhibur Rahman	30,449	20.55	N/A
Independent	Lion	Enamul Haque Sardar	20,745	14.00	N/A
JaPa(E)	Plough	Md. Yahya Chowdhury	18,032	12.17	N/A
KM	Wall clock	Muhammad Muntasir Ali	5,171	3.49	N/A
IAB	Hand fan	Md. Amir Uddin	1,740	1.17	N/A
Independent	Car	Mohammad Abdur Rab	1,170	0.79	N/A
NPP(S)	Mango	Md. Manowar Hussain	1,156	0.78	N/A
BNF	Television	Md. Moshahid Khan	305	0.21	N/A
Valid votes			148,188	98.88	
Invalid votes			1,685	1.12	
Total votes			149,873	100.0	
Registered voters/turnout			286,586	52.30	▲47.10
Majority			38,971	26.30	−20.64
Gano Forum gain from JaPa(E)					

General Election 2014: Sylhet-2
Party	Candidate	Votes	%	±%
JP(E)	Yahya Chowdhury	48,157	73.5	N/A
Independent	Muhibur Rahman	17,389	26.5	N/A
Majority		30,768	46.9	+45.4
Turnout		65,546	23.1	−64.0
JP(E) gain from AL				

=== Elections in the 2000s ===
General Election 2008: Sylhet-2
Party	Candidate	Votes	%	±%
AL	Shafiqur Rahaman Chowdhury	109,356	50.3	+21.2
BNP	Ilias Ali	106,040	48.8	N/A
BIF	Md. Ahmad Ali Halily	595	0.3	N/A
JSD	Mokulisur Rahaman	530	0.2	N/A
BDB	Mahabubur Rahaman Chowdhury	525	0.2	N/A
BKA	Abdur Rahman	391	0.2	N/A
Majority		3,316	1.5	−23.9
Turnout		217,437	87.1	+14.9
AL gain from BNP				

General Election 2001: Sylhet-2
Party	Candidate	Votes	%	±%
BNP	Ilias Ali	103,460	54.5	+25.2
AL	Shah Azizur Rahman	55,291	29.1	−3.0
IJOF	Muhibur Rahman	27,905	14.7	N/A
Independent	Azizun Nesa	1,782	0.9	N/A
KSJL	Mahmad Ali	1,253	0.7	N/A
CPB	Md. Afroz Ali	316	0.2	N/A
Majority		48,169	25.4	+22.9
Turnout		190,007	72.2	+7.2
BNP gain from AL				

=== Elections in the 1990s ===
General Election June 1996: Sylhet-2
Party	Candidate	Votes	%	±%
AL	Shah Azizur Rahman	42,266	32.1	N/A
JP(E)	Maqsood Ebne Aziz Lama	39,044	29.7	−10.4
BNP	Ilias Ali	38,473	29.3	N/A
Jamaat	Abdul Hannan	6,382	4.9	+0.2
Jamiat Ulema-e-Islam Bangladesh	Sheikh Mou Md. A Shahid	2,705	2.1	+1.0
Jatiya Janata Party (Nurul Islam)	Md. Nurul Islam Khan	1,139	0.9	N/A
Sammilita Sangram Parishad	A. F. M. Abdul Qayum	1,028	0.8	N/A
Jatiya Samajtantrik Dal-JSD	Moinul Islam	267	0.2	N/A
Gano Forum	Gias Uddin Ahmed	193	0.1	N/A
Majority		3,222	2.5	−14.9
Turnout		131,497	65.0	+25.7
AL gain from JP(E)				

General Election 1991: Sylhet-2
Party	Candidate	Votes	%	±%
JP(E)	Maqsood Ebne Aziz Lama	39,015	40.1	
BAKSAL	Md. Lutfor Rahman	22,087	22.7	
Independent	Muhibur Rahman	12,312	12.7	
BNP	MA Haq	8,493	8.7	
Jatiya Janata Party and Gonotantrik Oikkya Jot	Nurul Islam Khan	7,007	7.2	
Jamaat	Lutfor Rahman Jaigirdar	4,542	4.7	
Jatiya Janata Party (Ashraf)	Md. Ashraf Ali	1,139	1.2	
Jamiat Ulema-e-Islam Bangladesh	Md. Abdul Matin	1,103	1.1	
Bangladesh Janata Party	Khondokar Farid Uddin Ahmed	813	0.8	
WPB	Md. Nurhossain Chowdhury	357	0.4	
Independent	Sattar Miah	243	0.2	
Independent	Inamul Haq Chowdhury	154	0.2	
Majority		16,928	17.4	
Turnout		97,265	39.3	
JP(E) hold				
