= Rana Miah =

Bangladeshi cricketer (born 1979)

Personal information
- Full name: Rana Miah
- Born: 8 October 1979 (age 47); Lal bazar, Sylhet, Coochbehar
- Batting: Right-handed

Domestic team information
- Years: Team
- 2000–08: Sylhet Division
- First-class debut: 16 January 2002 Sylhet Division v Khulna Division
- Last First-class: 24 February 2006 Sylhet Division v Dhaka Division
- List A debut: 30 November 2000 Sylhet Division v Barisal Division
- Last List A: 8 January 2008 Sylhet Division v Chittagong Division

Career statistics
Competition	FC	LA
Matches	19	33
Runs scored	648	321
Batting average	20.25	16.89
100s/50s	0/3	0/0
Top score	74	42
Balls bowled	593	95
Wickets	7	4
Bowling average	27.85	22.25
5 wickets in innings	0	0
10 wickets in match	0	0
Best bowling	2/13	3/36
Catches/stumpings	11/0	15/0
- Source: ESPNcricinfo, 2 September 2017

Mohammad Rana Miah is a first-class and List A cricketer from Bangladesh. He was born on 8 October 1979 in Lamabazar, Sylhet and played as a right-handed batsman and occasional bowler for Sylhet Division between 2001/02 and 2005/06. He made three first-class fifties, with a best of 74 against Dhaka Division and took 2 for 13 on one occasion against Chittagong Division.
