= Shanaj Ahmed =

Bangladeshi cricketer (born 1993)

Personal information
- Born: 9 January 1993 (age 33); Moulvibazar, Bangladesh
- Source: ESPNcricinfo, 25 September 2016

Shanaj Ahmed (born 9 January 1993) is a Bangladeshi cricketer who plays for Sylhet Division. He made his Twenty20 debut on 11 June 2021, for Old DOHS Sports Club in the 2021 Dhaka Premier Division Twenty20 Cricket League.

== See also ==
- List of Sylhet Division cricketers
