= Enamul Haque Chowdhury =

Bangladeshi politician

- এনামুল হক চৌধুরী

Sylhet-2 Jatiya Sangsad
- In office 1979–1982
- In office 1986–1988

Personal details
- Born: 1948 Gohorpur, Sylhet District, East Bengal, Dominion of Pakistan (now in Balaganj Upazila, Bangladesh)
- Died: 16 September 2011 (aged 62–63) Sylhet
- Resting place: Shah Jalal Dargah
- Party: Jatiya Party (Ershad)
- Education: Master's degree
- Alma mater: Murari Chand College; Madan Mohan College; Pilot High School
- Awards: Bir Bikrom

Enamul Haque Chowdhury (1948–2011) was a politician in Sylhet District of Bangladesh who was a Jatiya party leader and Member of Parliament from Sylhet-2.

== Birth and early life ==
Enamul Haque Chowdhury was born in 1948 to Bashirul Haque and Sayra Khanom in Gohorpur, Sylhet, East Bengal, Dominion of Pakistan (now in Balaganj Upazila, Bangladesh).

== Career ==
He was elected to Parliament in 1979 and 1986 from Sylhet-2 as a Jatiya Party candidate.

== Death ==
Enamul Haque Chowdhury died on 16 September 2011. He was buried at the Shah Jalal Dargah in Sylhet.

== See also ==
- 1979 Bangladeshi general election
- 1986 Bangladeshi general election
