= Muhammad Amin (politician from Sylhet) =

Pakistani politician

Muhammad Amin was a Member of the 3rd National Assembly of Pakistan as a representative of East Pakistan.

== Career ==
Amin was a Member of the 3rd National Assembly of Pakistan representing Sylhet-VI. He was also a Member of the 4th National Assembly of Pakistan representing Sylhet-VI.
