= Mokabbir Khan =

Bangladeshi politician

- মোকাব্বির খান

Member of Parliament
- In office 3 January 2019 – 7 January 2024
- Preceded by: Yahya Chowdhury
- Constituency: Sylhet-2

Personal details
- Born: Balaganj, Sylhet, Bangladesh
- Political party: Gano Forum
- Education: Self-educated

Mokabbir Khan (Bengali: মোকাব্বির খান) is a Bangladeshi politician who has served as Member of Parliament for Sylhet-2. He is a member of Gano Forum.

== Biography ==
Khan was born in Balaganj, Sylhet District into a Bengali Muslim family. His parents are Muhammad Firuz Khan and Muhibunnisa Khanom.

Khan was elected to parliament for the Sylhet-2 constituency, as a Gano Forum candidate, on 30 December 2018, defeating Yahya Chowdhury. His taking of the oath of parliament was criticised by his party which had decided to not attend parliament. He is a member of Parliamentary Library Committee.
