= Obaidullah (Bangladeshi cricketer) =

Bangladeshi cricketer

Career statistics
| Competition | First-class | List A |
|---|---|---|
| Matches | 2 | 2 |
| Runs scored | 44 | 12 |
| Batting average | 14.66 | 6 |
| 100s/50s | 0/0 | 0/0 |
| Top score | 23 | 8 |
| Balls bowled | 138 | 114 |
| Wickets | 2 | 0 |
| Bowling average | 27.50 | – |
| 5 wickets in innings | 0 | – |
| 10 wickets in match | 0 | – |
| Best bowling | 2/39 | – |
| Catches/stumpings | 0/– | 1/– |
- Source: CricketArchive, 21 April 2023

Obaidullah is a cricketer from Bangladesh. He played two first-class and two List A games for Sylhet Division in 2000/01. His batting was not successful but he did take 2 for 39 against Barisal Division with the ball.
