= Sayem Alam =

Bangladeshi cricketer (born 1993)

Personal information
- Born: 14 April 1993 (age 33); Sylhet, Bangladesh
- Relatives: Rajin Saleh (brother); Nasirul Alam (brother); Rezaul Haque (brother)
- Source: ESPNcricinfo, 25 September 2016

Sayem Alam (born 14 April 1993) is a Bangladeshi cricketer who plays for Sylhet Division. He made his first-class debut as an opener for Sylhet Division against Rajshahi Division in the 2009/10 National Cricket League on 14 January 2010.

== See also ==
- List of Sylhet Division cricketers
