= Rintu Roy =

Bangladeshi cricketer

Career statistics
Competition	List A
Matches	4
Runs scored	–
Batting average	–
100s/50s	–
Top score	–
Balls bowled	168
Wickets	4
Bowling average	18.75
5 wickets in innings	0
10 wickets in match	0
Best bowling	2/26
Catches/stumpings	0/–
- Source: espn cricinfo, June 18 2025

Rintu Roy is a List A cricketer from Bangladesh who played four matches for Sylhet Division during the 2001–02 season. His best bowling, 2 for 26, came against Barisal Division.
