= South Point School and College =

Private school and college in Dhaka, Bangladesh

South Point School & College
- সাউথ পয়েন্ট স্কুল এন্ড কলেজ
- Logo of South Point School and College
- Dhaka; Bangladesh

Information
- School type: National curriculum Private
- Motto: Knowledge is power
- Founded: 2002; 24 years ago
- Founder: Hamida Ali
- Chairperson: Eng. M.A Rashid
- Principal: Hamida Ali, founder principal; Wing Commander A M Amjad Hussain (retd.) (Baridhara branch); Colonel Md. Shamsul Alam, psc (retd.) (Malibagh branch); Lt. Colonel Sheikh Amzad Hossain (retd.) (Mirpur branch); Colonel Dr. E M Morshed Alam, (Retd) (Banani branch); Group captain Md. Jahangir Alam Talukder, psc, mds, MBA (retd.) (Uttara Branch)
- Gender: Male and female
- Language: English and Bengali
- Campus: Malibagh; Baridhara; Mirpur; Banani; Uttara; Shampur
- Campus type: Urban
- Colours: White and Blue
- Slogan: A School with a Difference
- Website: spscdhaka.com

South Point School & College (Bengali: সাউথ পয়েন্ট স্কুল এন্ড কলেজ), also known as SPSC, is a private school and college, founded in 2002, and based in Dhaka, Bangladesh. It has six branches, located in Baridhara, Malibagh, Mirpur, Banani, Uttara and Shampur. The school was founded by Hamida Ali, former principal of Viqarunnisa Noon School and College.

In 2009, the institution was recognized as the best educational institution by the Dhaka Board of Education. The school often appears in different newspapers with Hamida Ali appearing in most of them, even appearing in the front page of a Bangladesh Pratidin newspaper in 2020.

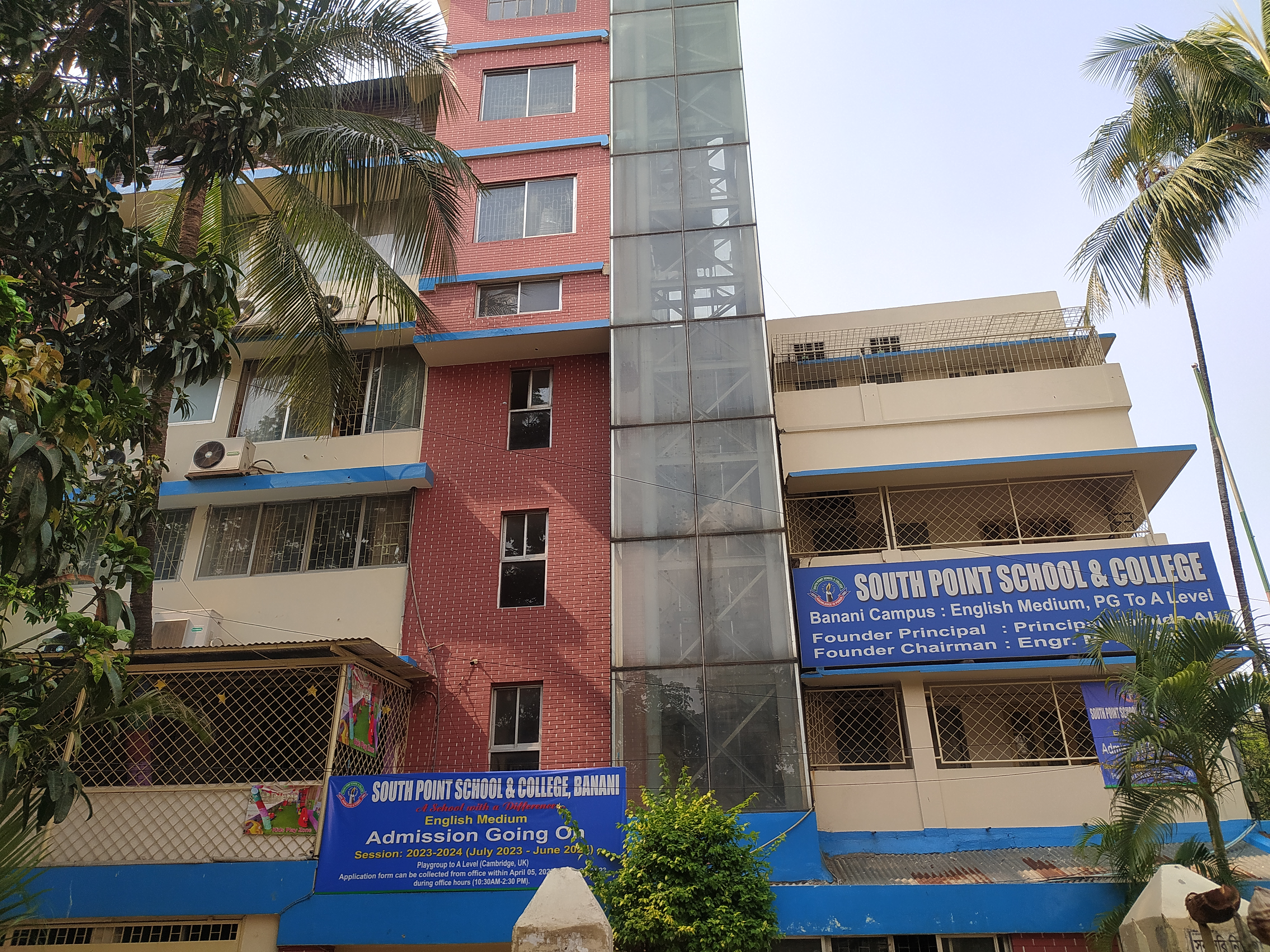
South Point School & College Banani Campus

== History ==
The school was founded by M.A Rashid and Hamida Ali, who was also its first principal, in 2003. The first campus was in Niketan before it moved to Malibagh and other branches.

In June 2020, during the COVID-19 pandemic, the college was criticised for arranging admission tests for English-medium students at the Malibagh campus. The school reopened on 12 September 2021 according to the orders of the Educational minister after 18 months of closure.

== Campuses and Branches ==
SPSC currently has 6 branches. Baridhara, Mirpur, Banani, Uttara, Shampur and the main branch is Malibagh. Malibagh has English medium, English version, Bangla medium and College. Bangla medium and English version are class 1-10 and English medium has 10 grades.

== Curriculum ==
South Point School & College offers a complete primary, elementary, and secondary school program leading to the PEC, JSC, SSC and HSC examinations taken by the Bangladesh Government.

Only the Malibagh branch, Mirpur branch, Banani branch and the Baridhara branch has English-medium and only the Banani branch is an only English-medium branch. The rest of the branches either are English version, Bangla-medium or Bangla version.

== Activities ==
=== Sports ===
South Point School and College does not have any official team in any sports but sports like cricket, football, and badminton are widely practiced across branches. An official inter-school cricket tournament was supposed to take place in Baridhara campus's ground on 17 March 2020, due to Bangabandhu's 100th birthday celebration but was later cancelled due to schools closing in Bangladesh from 17 March due to the COVID-19 pandemic.

=== Annual sports day ===
An annual sports competition takes place each year between January and February. Every students does not get selected for the competition. Each student who wants to participate in the competition have to give test on their respective sports. For example, the one who will become first out of all in a marathon test will get qualified for the competition and not others. Different sports events takes in the competition including marathon (meter depends), "Morog lorai" etc. Assembly takes place before the competition starts.

=== Inter-school art competition ===
An inter-school art competition takes place in all six branches each year for each special occasions like Independence Day, Pahela Baishakh, Bangabandhu's birthday, Victory Day etc.

=== Extra-curricular activities (ECA) ===
The institute started extra-curricular activities classes in 2018. Before 2018, extra-curricular activities only included singing and drawing but after 2018, extra-curricular activities included dancing, debating, drawing, science projects, handwriting practices, singing etc. The extra-curricular activities classes takes place only on every Tuesday after the ending of main school classes. The practice of inter-school competitions and national competitions of dancing, singing etc. takes place through extra-curricular activities classes.

== See also ==
- School
- Education in Bangladesh
- College
