= Nasirul Alam =

Bangladeshi cricketer (born 1977)

Personal information
- Full name: Khandakar Mohammad Nasirul Alam
- Born: 5 September 1977 (age 49); Lamabazar, Sylhet, Bangladesh
- Batting: Right-handed
- Bowling: Right-arm offbreak
- Relatives: Rajin Saleh (brother); Sayem Alam (brother); Rezaul Haque (brother)
- Source: ESPNcricinfo, 29 August 2020

Nasirul Alam (born 5 September 1977) is a Bangladeshi former first-class cricketer who played for Sylhet Division.
