= Rezaul Haque (cricketer) =

Bangladeshi cricketer (born 1982)

Personal information
- Full name: Khondokar Mohammad Rezaul Haque
- Born: 20 November 1982 (age 43); Sylhet, Bangladesh
- Batting: Right-handed
- Bowling: Left-arm medium-fast
- Relatives: Rajin Saleh (brother); Sayem Alam (brother); Nasirul Alam (brother)
- Source: ESPNcricinfo, 29 August 2020

Rezaul Haque (born 20 November 1982) is a Bangladeshi first-class cricketer who played for Sylhet Division. He made his debut both in first class and A List cricket in 2000/01 and his last game in the two formats were in January 2010 and January 2009, respectively.
