= Rajin Saleh =

Bangladeshi cricketer (born 1983)

Personal information
- Full name: Khondokar Mohammad Rajin Saleh Alam
- Born: 20 November 1983 (age 42); Sylhet, Bangladesh
- Batting: Right-handed
- Bowling: Right-arm offbreak
- Role: Batsman
- Relatives: Sayem Alam (brother); Nasirul Alam (brother); Rezaul Haque (brother)

International information
- National side: Bangladesh (2003–2008)
- Test debut (cap 33): 20 August 2003 v Pakistan
- Last Test: 25 October 2008 v New Zealand
- ODI debut (cap 67): 9 September 2003 v Pakistan
- Last ODI: 13 October 2006 v Zimbabwe
- ODI shirt no.: 35

Career statistics
Competition	Test	ODI	FC	LA
Matches	24	43	148	140
Runs scored	1141	1,005	8,481	3,153
Batting average	25.93	23.92	36.08	24.63
100s/50s	0/7	1/6	18/44	5/14
Top score	89	108*	201*	108*
Balls bowled	438	539	1,563	1,470
Wickets	2	15	9	38
Bowling average	134.00	30.60	104.66	32.92
5 wickets in innings	0	0	0	0
10 wickets in match	0	0	0	0
Best bowling	1/9	4/16	2/44	4/16
Catches/stumpings	13/–	9/–	128/–	44/–
- Source: CricInfo, 12 March 2023

Khondokar Mohammad Rajin Saleh Alam (Bengali: খন্দকার মোহাম্মদ রাজিন সালেহ আলম) (born November 20, 1983) is a Bangladeshi former cricketer, who has played Tests and ODIs for the national team. He was recognised for his outstanding fielding attributes and was one of the best fielders of his generation. He was also a member of the national 2006 ICC Champions Trophy and 2007 Cricket World Cup squads. In November 2018, he announced his retirement from first-class cricket.

== International career ==
Alam was the twelfth man in Bangladesh's inaugural Test, played against India on November 10, 2000. He then spent three years out of the national squad. He made his Test debut against Pakistan in autumn 2003 when Bangladesh toured Pakistan, scoring a half-century on debut. He also made his ODI debut in that same series. During and after that series he proved himself to be one of the regular members of the national team. In 2004 ICC Champions Trophy he captained the side in the absence of the injured Habibul Bashar. He also made an unbeaten knock of 108 against Kenya to become the third Bangladeshi batsman to score a century in One-day Internationals.

Preceded by Habibul Bashar	Bangladesh national cricket captain 2004	Succeeded by Habibul Bashar
