= Yahya Chowdhury =

Bangladeshi politician

Yahya Chowdhury (born 17 February 1964) is a Bangladeshi politician, a member of the Jatiya Sangsad and the current Joint Secretary of the central committee of the Jatiya Party.

== Early life and education ==
Yahya was born on 17 February 1974 at Sylhet city. He is the eldest son of his parents Abdul Hye Chowdhury and Dilara Begum. He had his primary secondary and college education in local school and college in Sylhet city. He had completed his SSC (Secondary School Certificate) from Shahjalal Jamia Islamia School and HSC (Higher Secondary Certificate) from Sylhet Government College. Chowdhury has completed his further higher education in LLB from University of Northampton, United Kingdom.

== Political career ==
Yahya Chowdhury has been involved in politics with Jatiya Party since the young age and had held several posts such as the Sylhet divisional Joint Convener of Jatiya Satro Shomaj in 1993. He was then appointed as the Sylhet divisional Joint Secretary of Jatiya Satro Shomaj in 1996. He also acted as Vice President of the Central Committee of Jatiya Satro Shomaj in 2004. He has then acted as the Sylhet divisional Joint Secretary of Jatiya Party in 2011 and then promoted to be the Joint Organising Secretary of the central committee of Jatiya Party in 2013. Yahya Chowdhury currently holds the position of the Joint Secretary of the central committee of Jatiya Party since 2017. He has been awarded as Ambassador For Peace by Universal Peace Federation in 2017.

Yahya Chowdhury was first elected to the Bangladesh National Parliament in January 2014 in the 10th national elections from Sylhet-2 Constituency. He is currently also appointed as the member of parliamentary standing committee of Ministry and Environment and Forest.
