= Maqsood Ebne Aziz Lama =

Bangladeshi politician

- মকসুদ ইবনে আজিজ লামা

Sylhet-2 Jatiya Sangsad
- In office 1988–1991
- In office 1991 – February 1996

Personal details
- Party: Jatiya Party (Ershad)

Maqsood Ebne Aziz Lama is a Bangladeshi Jatiya Party politician and former member of parliament for Sylhet-2.

== Career ==
Maqsood Ebne Aziz Lama was elected to parliament in 1988 and 1991 from Sylhet-2 as a Jatiya Party candidate.
