= Shamsuddin Qasemi =

Bangladeshi Islamic scholar

Mujahid-e-Millat Mawlana Shamsuddin Qasemi

Personal life
- Born: 5 March 1935 Sandwip, Chittagong District, Bengal Province
- Died: 19 October 1996 (aged 61) Jamia Hussainia Arzabad, Mirpur, Dhaka, Bangladesh
- Resting place: Mirpur, Dhaka, Bangladesh
- Parent: Muhammad Muddassir (father)
- Political party: Jamiat Ulema-e-Islam Bangladesh
- Education: Darul Uloom Deoband; Al-Jameatul Arabiatul Islamia Ziri; Jamia Ashrafia

Religious life
- Religion: Islam
- Denomination: Sunni
- Jurisprudence: Hanafi
- Tariqa: Chishti (Sabiri-Imdadi); Naqshbandi; Qadri; Suhrawardy
- Movement: Deobandi

Muslim leader
- Teacher: Idris Kandhlawi; Ahmed Ali Lahori
- Disciple of: Hussain Ahmad Madani

Secretary-General, Jamiat Ulema-e-Islam Bangladesh
- In office October 1974 – 1976
- Preceded by: Shah Ahraruzzaman
- Succeeded by: Muhiuddin Khan
- In office 1978–1991
- Preceded by: Muhiuddin Khan
- Succeeded by: Muhammad Wakkas

Shamsuddin Qasemi (Bengali: শামসুদ্দীন কাসেমী; 5 March 1935 – 19 October 1996) was a Bangladeshi Islamic scholar, politician, author and educationist. He was the founding president of the Khatme Nabuwwat Andolan Council, former secretary-general of Jamiat Ulema-e-Islam Bangladesh, former principal of Jamia Madania Chittagong and Jamia Hussainia Arzabad, and the founding chief-editor of the monthly Paygam-e-Haqq and weekly Jamiat magazines. He is also noted for his contributions during the Bangladesh Liberation War of 1971.

== Early life and family ==
Qasemi was born on 5 March 1935, to Bengali Muslim parents Moulvi Muhammad Muddassir and Umme Habiba in the neighbourhood of Nayabasti, located in the island of Sandwip, off the coast of Chittagong District. His father was a descendant of Ali Munshi, who was a wakil and munshi, trained in the Persian language. Ali Munshi was also a distinguished anti-colonial rebel based in Sandwip. His ancestors arrived in Chittagong in the 1660s, when Shah Shuja was seeking asylum in the region.

== Education ==
His early education began at the local maktab under Mawlana Abdul Aziz Munshi and then at the local primary school, before joining the Riazul Uloom Madrasa. It was with the suggestion of Muhammad Musa, his teacher at Riazul Uloom, that he later enrolled at the Harishpur Bashiria Ahmadia Senior Madrasa in Sandwip. Qasemi passed his dakhil, alim (1st) and fazil (1st) qualifications from the Harishpur madrasa. He studied various books there including Al-Hidayah, Tafsir al-Jalalayn, and Mishkat al-Masabih. In 1955, he set off for Darul Uloom Deoband in India, where he learnt fiqh, Arabic literature and logic. His teachers in Deoband included Nasir Ahmed Khan, Naim Deobandi, Ahmed Hasan Bihari, Abdul Ahad Deobandi, Mian Akhtar Husayn and Faiz Ali Shah. However, Qasemi could only spend two years in Deoband, due to an illness. After returning to Bengal and recovering from his illness, he was unable to return to Deoband due to the Visa policy of India. He therefore enrolled for one year at Al-Jamiah al-Arabiyyah al-Islamiyyah Jiri, a madrasa in Patiya, Chittagong that was modelled on the Deobandi methodology. After spending some time there under the likes of Abdul Wadud Chatgami, Saleh Ahmad Chatgami and Mufti Nurul Haq, he set off for Lahore in West Pakistan, where he became a student at Jamia Ashrafia, graduating from the faculty of Hadith and tafsir. Among his teachers were Idris Kandhlawi, Jamil Ahmed Thanvi, Ziaul Haq Kembelpuri, Yaqub Hazarvi, Ghulam Mustafa Hanafi, Abdul Ghani Sunni and Rasul Khan. In 1960, he studied tafsir with Ahmed Ali Lahori. In the realm of tasawwuf, he was a murid (disciple) of Hussain Ahmad Madani.

== Career ==
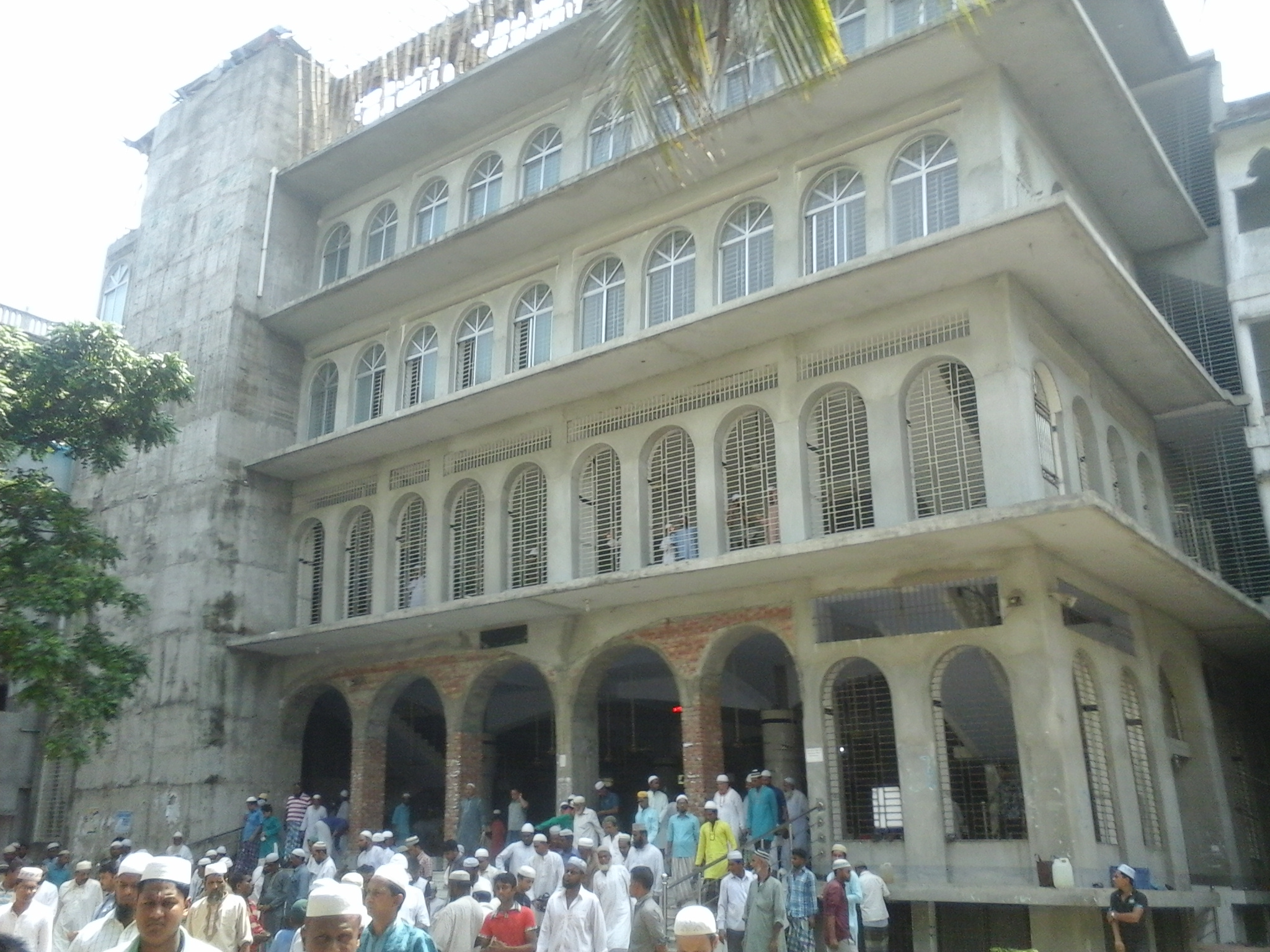
Qasemi spent nearly a decade teaching at the Faridabad madrasa.

Qasemi returned to Bengal in 1961, beginning his career as a teacher at the Sohagi Madrasa in Mymensingh. After that, he taught at the Jamia Hussainia Ashraful Uloom Madrasa in Bara Katara for two years, and then at the Jamia Arabia Imdadul Uloom Faridabad for six to seven years. He played an important role in the establishment of Jamia Islamia Darul Uloom Madania madrasa in Jatrabari Thana, serving as an unpaid teacher there for one year.

After the independence of Bangladesh in 1971, he became the principal of Kashiful Uloom Madrasa in Shulukbahar, Chittagong and the imam and khatib of Dampara Baitul Aziz Mosque. Qasemi founded many madrasas in Bangladesh including Sholakbahar Madrasa in Chittagong, Jamia Madania Madrasa in Jatrabari, Jamiatul Madania Rajfulbaria in Savar and Madinatul Uloom in Aminbazar. In 1975, Qasemi became one of the founders of the Jamia Hussainia Arzabad in Mirpur, Dhaka. He served as this madrasa's Chief Muhaddith and Principal until his death.

=== Political career ===
Qasemi was closely associated with the Jamiat Ulema-e-Islam Bangladesh, serving as vice-president, executive president and three-time elected secretary-general within a period of over thirty years. When Fazlur Rahman Malik was appointed head of the Central Institute of Islamic Research in Karachi by the President of Pakistan Ayub Khan in 1961, Qasemi organised a vigorous movement against it in Bengal. In the same year, Qasemi also called out Ayub Khan for the "Muslim Family Laws" bill. The East Pakistan Jamiat Committee was founded on 16 March 1966, with Abdul Karim Shaykh-e-Kouria elected as its president and Qasemi as secretary-general. Following the Israeli occupation of the West Bank in 1967, Qasemi called for a boycott of goods, on behalf of the East Pakistan Jamiat.

Through his efforts, the Jamiat formulated a resolution on 22 March 1971, motivating and expressing support to the Bengali freedom fighters during the Bangladesh Liberation War. Qasemi opposed the Pakistan Army for its actions both in public and in writing, and assisted the freedom fighters in a number of ways. He organised a public rally in Bahadur Shah Park, Dhaka, where he gave a speech which resulted in the Pakistani soldiers imprisoning him at the Dhaka Cantonment.

Qasemi declared a strike in Sylhet in response to Daud Haider's insulting poem against religion. He was arrested for this decision, although the Government of Bangladesh under Sheikh Mujibur Rahman eventually did exile Haider. In 1974, Qasemi was elected as vice-president. He was elected as secretary-general in 1977, and on 25 February 1980.

He was vice-president of the first Election Management Committee under Muhammadullah Hafezzi, and the inaugural organising secretary of the Bangladesh Khilafat Andolan in 1981. In 1990, Qasemi was one of the founding co-ordinators of the Islami Oikya Jote. He was also the founding president of the Khatme Nabuwwat Movement Council and one of the foremost leaders of the Majlis-e-Tahaffuz Khatme Nabuwat Guild. In 1994, he held a Tanzime Ahl-e-Sunnat Wal Jamaat conference at the IEB Auditorium which criticised the Jamaat-e-Islami organisation.

== Death and legacy ==
Qasemi died on 19 October 1996, in his room at the Jamia Hussainia Arzabad, with his last word being labbayk whilst the adhan for Isha was being announced. He left behind five sons and three daughters. His janaza was led by Abdul Karim Shaykh-e-Kouria and he was subsequently in the graveyard adjacent to the Mirpur Martyred Intellectual Graveyard.

== Works ==
Qasemi was the founder of the weekly Jamiat and monthly Paygham-e-Haqq magazines. He also wrote several books including:

- বাইতুল মোকাদ্দাস ও মসজিদে আকসা (Bait al-Muqaddas and Masjid-e-Aqsa)
- খ্রিস্টান মিশনারীদের উৎপাত (Origin of Christian missionaries)
- রমজানের সওগাত (Gift of Ramadan)
- ইসলাম বনাম কমিউনিজম (Islam versus Communism)
- ধর্মনিরপেক্ষতা (Secularism)
- শিয়া কাফের ও কাদিয়ানী ধর্মমত (Creed of the Shia, disbelievers and Qadianis)
