= Dewan Taimur Raja Chowdhury =

Bangladeshi politician

- দেওয়ান তৈমুর রাজা চৌধুরী

Member of the Bangladesh Parliament for Sylhet-7
- In office 18 February 1979 – 12 February 1982
- Preceded by: Nurul Islam Khan

Member of the East Bengal Legislative Assembly
- In office 1947–1954
- Preceded by: Position established

Member of the Assam Legislative Assembly
- In office 1946–1947
- Preceded by: Dewan Eklimur Raja Chowdhury
- Succeeded by: Position abolished
- Constituency: Sylhet Sadar-W

Personal details
- Born: 5 November 1917 Rampasha, Assam, British India
- Died: 14 December 1997 (aged 80) Sylhet, Bangladesh
- Party: Bangladesh Nationalist Party
- Spouse: Shaila Ahsanullah
- Relatives: Hason Raja (grandfather); Begum Ahsanullah (stepmother-in-law)
- Education: Murari Chand College

Dewan Taimur Raja Chowdhury (Bengali: দেওয়ান তৈমুর রাজা চৌধুরী; 5 November 1917 – 14 December 1997) was a Bangladesh Nationalist Party politician, landowner, and poet. He was a member of parliament from Sylhet-7.

== Early life ==
Chowdhury was born on 5 November 1917 to a Bengali Muslim family in Rampasha, Bishwanath, Sylhet District, Assam Province, British India (now Sylhet Division, Bangladesh). His father was Khan Bahadur Dewan Eklimur Raja Chowdhury, and his mother was Meherjan Banu. His paternal grandfather was the renowned Bengali mystic poet and songwriter Hason Raja.

Chowdhury began his education at Rajaganj Primary School before enrolling at the Sylhet Government Alia Madrasah, where he did Islamic studies and also studied Bengali, Arabic, Persian, and Urdu. He then moved on to study at Rasamay Memorial High School and Sylhet Government High School. He graduated from Murari Chand College. As a student, he was the secretary of the Assam Provincial Muslim Students Federation.

== Career ==
Chowdhury's career began with taking care of his father's various properties, such as the Alijan Coal Mine in Assam, Rupamukhi and Sonamukhi in Tripura, and Moulvibazar Tea Garden. From 1943 to 1946, Chowdhury was the honorary magistrate of Sylhet District. He went on to serve as vice chairman and then chairman of the Sylhet Local Board. In 1946, he was elected to the Assam Legislative Assembly. He was involved in the 1947 Sylhet referendum that saw Sylhet rejoined with East Bengal.

Chowdhury joined the East Pakistan Muslim League and served as the president of the Sylhet District Muslim League. In 1965, he was elected to the East Pakistan Provincial Assembly. Chowdhury was made the president of the Bangladesh Nationalist Party Sylhet unit in 1979. Chowdhury was elected to parliament from Sylhet-7 as a Bangladesh Nationalist Party candidate in 1979. He was a state minister in the cabinet of President Ziaur Rahman. He wrote mystical poems and songs like his grandfather. He founded the Dewan Taimur Raja Trust with support from Islami Bank.

== Personal life ==
Chowdhury's younger brother, Saifur Raja, was married to Shaila Ahsanullah of the Dhaka Nawab Family. She was a daughter of Nawabzada Khwaja Ahsanullah, the youngest son of Nawab Bahadur Sir Salimullah.

== Death ==
Chowdhury died on 14 December 1997.
