= Abdul Momin Imambari =

Bangladeshi Islamic scholar (1930–2020)

Mawlana Abdul Momin Shaykh-e-Imambari
- আব্দুল মোমিন ইমামবাড়ী

Personal life
- Born: 1930 Nabiganj, Habiganj, Sylhet district, British Raj
- Died: 8 April 2020 (aged 89–90) Bangladesh
- Parents: Muhammad Abdus Sattar (father); Gulbahar Bibi (mother)
- Education: Darul Uloom Deoband

Religious life
- Religion: Islam
- Denomination: Sunni
- Jurisprudence: Hanafi
- Tariqa: Chishti (Sabiri-Imdadi); Naqshbandi; Qadri; Suhrawardy
- Movement: Deobandi

Muslim leader
- Teacher: Hussain Ahmad Madani, Ibrahim Balyawi
- Disciple of: Hussain Ahmad Madani
- Disciples: Muhiuddin Khan

Amir of Jamiat Ulema-e-Islam Bangladesh
- In office 4 September 2005 – 8 April 2020
- Preceded by: Ashraf Ali Bishwanathi
- Succeeded by: Zia Uddin

Personal details
- Party: Jamiat Ulema-e-Islam

Abdul Momin Imambari (Bengali: আব্দুল মোমিন শায়খে ইমামবাড়ী; 1930 – 8 April 2020) was a Bangladeshi Islamic scholar, teacher and politician. He was the former president of Jamiat Ulema-e-Islam Bangladesh.

== Early life and education ==
Abdul Momin was born in 1930, to a Bengali Muslim parents Muhammad Abdus Sattar and Gulbahar Bibi in the village of Purangaon in Nabiganj, Habiganj subdivision (then located under the Sylhet district). He studied at the Jāmiʿah Saʿdiyyah Raidhar and Jāmiʿah Islāmiyyah Imambari madrasas, before setting out to Hindustan where he enrolled at the Darul Uloom Deoband seminary. He studied in Deoband for six years, graduating from the faculty of Hadith studies. Among his teachers there were Hussain Ahmad Madani, Ibrahim Balyawi, Syed Fakhrul Hasan and Merajul Haq. He pledged bay'ah to Madani and was authorised with khilafat (spiritual succession) in 1957.

== Career ==
He returned to Bengal after completing his studies, and spent eight years as teacher at Jāmiʿah Islāmiyyah Imambari. He then taught at the Balidhara madrasa in Dinarpur for a year, and then at the Umednagar Title Madrasa in Habiganj and the Jamia Madania of Bishwanath, teaching at both for two years respectively. He was then appointed as the principal of the Jāmiʿah Madaniyyah Nabiganj, and he took on this role for four years. In 1989, he returned to the Imambari madrasa, and served as its principal and Shaykh al-Hadith (Professor of Hadith studies) until 2010. He then served as the Shaykh al-Hadith of Hossainia Madrasa for a year. In 2012, Imambari became the Shaykh al-Hadith of Jamia Darul Qur'an in Sylhet for the rest of his life.

=== Political career ===
Imambari was aligned with the Jamiat Ulema-e-Islam, having been a member of its student wing, Jamiat Tulaba-e-Arabia from an early age. He became the acting president, and later president, of the Jamiat's Habiganj District branch. On 24 June 2000, he was elected as the patron of Jamiat Ulema-e-Islam Bangladesh. After the death of Ashraf Ali Bishwanathi in 2005, a joint conference was held on 4 September between the Jamiat's working council and shura in which Imambari was elected as the president of the nationwide political party. In 2017, he inaugurated a rally on the road from Sylhet to Teknaf in solidarity with the Rohingyas who had escaped Myanmar as a result of religious persecution. The rallies were supported by the Bangladeshi parliamentarian Shahinur Pasha Chowdhury.

== Death and legacy ==
Imambari died on 8 April 2020. Muhiuddin Khan was his disciple, and Ubaydullah Faruq pledged bay'ah to him during his lifetime, eventually becoming his khalifah (spiritual successor). His son, Emdadullah, is a Mawlana. A dua ceremony was held at the Jamia Madania madrasa of Bishwanath dedicated to Imambari on 27 September 2020, organised by Shibbir Ahmad Bishwanathi and Hasan bin Fahim.

== See more ==
- List of Deobandis

Political offices
Preceded by Ashraf Ali Bishwanathi	Amir of Jamiat Ulema-e-Islam Bangladesh; 4 September 2005 – 8 April 2020	Succeeded by Zia Uddin
