= Naodhar =

Villiage in Bangladesh

Coordinates: 24.8586°N 91.7064°E

Naodhar or Nowdher is a village in Bishwanath Upazila, under Sylhet District, Bangladesh. It is divided into three parha/mahalla: Rahman Nagor, Mazparha and Purboparha.

The village lies 2 kilometres (1.2 mi) to the west of Rampasha and 3.5 kilometres (2.2 mi) to the east of Singerkatch Bazar. Naodhar is very close to Boiragi Bazar. The Makunda River flows to the north of the village.

The village has four mosques and one primary school.

== See also ==
- List of villages in Bangladesh
