= Al-Markazul Islami As-Salafi =

- আল-মারকাযুল ইসলামী আস-সালাফী

Location
- Nawdapara, Sapura, Rajshahi; Bangladesh
- 24.4092°N 88.6096°E

Information
- Type: Non-government
- Motto: إقامة الدين علي منهج السلف (To establish Islam upon Manhaj of pious predecessors)
- Established: 1981
- Founder: Muhammad Asadullah Al-Ghalib
- School board: Bangladesh Madrasah Education Board
- School district: Rajshahi
- Chairman: Muhammad Asadullah Al-Ghalib
- Principal: Nurul Islam (acting)
- Faculty: 110+
- Grades: Primary to higher secondary (Ibtiadee-Alim)
- Enrollment: 3600+
- Campus size: 7 acres
- Campus type: Urban
- Website: amis.edu.bd

Al-Markazul Islami As-Salafi (Arabic: المركز الإسلامي السلفي; Bengali: আল-মারকাযুল ইসলামী আস-সালাফী) is an exceptional Islamic educational institution in Bangladesh, based on the Manhaj Salaf and run by the Ahlehadeeth Movement Bangladesh with a unique curriculum and high standards. It is located in Nawdapara, Rajshahi, in the eastern division of Bangladesh, and has some branches in other cities across the country.

== History ==
Al-Markazul Islami As-Salafi was established as a Hifz Madrasa by local religious leaders in Nawdapara, Sapura, Rajshahi, in 1981. It was later remodeled and renamed Al-Markazul Islami As-Salafi in 1991.

== Administration ==
The Madrasa was established by Muhammad Asadullah Al-Ghalib and is managed by the education department of Ahlehadeeth Andolon Bangladesh and Hadith Foundation Education Board. Since its inception, three renowned Islamic scholars have served as its principal.

- Abdus Samad Salafi (1991–2008)
- Abdur Razzaque bin Yousuf (2009-2014)
- Abdul Khaleque salafi (2014–2021)
- Hafez Muhammad Akhtar Madani (1st July, 2026–Present)
