= Ahle Hadith Andolon Bangladesh =

Islamist organization

Ahle Hadith Andolon Bangladesh is an Islamist organisation in Bangladesh and led by Muhammad Asadullah Al-Ghalib. It is a militant group that has been funded by Revival of Islamic Heritage Society, a Kuwaiti non governmental organisation. It is closely related to Jama'atul Mujahideen Bangladesh, an Islamist terrorist organisation.

== History ==
In 1993, Bangladeshi intelligence agencies provided a report on the activities of Muhammad Asadullah Al-Ghalib and requested permission from the government to detain and interrogate him.

In 1998, Ghalib travelled to India and met Maolana Abdul Matin Salafi, an Islamist preacher who had been expelled from Bangladesh by President Hussain Mohammad Ershad, and was Ghalib's spiritual teacher. He was given a show cause notice for traveling to India with permission from his university by the register at University of Rajshahi, Muhammad Yunus, after returning to Bangladesh. Muhammad Yunus would later be assassinated by Islamic militants.

In 2000, four Kashmiri militants were held with one Ahle Hadith Andolon Bangladesh member from Bangladesh-India border by Bangladesh Rifles. They would later be released. Ghalib had frequent visitors from India, Pakistan, and Arab countries and would introduce these visitors to Ahle Hadith Andolon Bangladesh activists as mujahideens.

In 2004, Ghalib showed certificates from two members of parliament, Mizanur Rahman Minu of Bangladesh Nationalist Party and Maolana Abdul Khalek of Bangladesh Jamaat-e-Islami, which certified that Ahle Hadith Andolon Bangladesh members were not militants to the press.

Muhammad Asadullah Al-Ghalib, leader of Ahle Hadith Andolon Bangladesh, was arrested in 2005 after arrested activists of Jamaat-ul-Mujahideen Bangladesh identified him as their spiritual guru. Special Branch of Bangladesh police identified Muhammad Asadullah Al-Ghalib, then professor at the University of Rajshahi, as a top leader of Jama'atul Mujahideen Bangladesh. On 2 September 2006, Ahle Hadith Andolon Bangladesh announced that they will form a political party called insaaf. In 2005, Glalib claimed Ahle Hadith Andolon Bangladesh has offices in 42 Districts of Bangladesh and is working towards the establishment of an Islamic State. According to a confessional statement of an accused in the 2005 Bangladesh bombings; the bombing were coordinated by Hafizur Rahman, a leader of Ahle Hadith Andolon Bangladesh.

On 13 August 2008, A. H. M. Khairuzzaman Liton, Mayor of Rajshahi and Awami League politician, visited the office Ahle Hadith Andolon Bangladesh and Muhammad Asadullah Al-Ghalib. He also visited the Ahle Hadith Jubo Sangha, the youth wing of Ahle Hadith Andolon Bangladesh and Al Markajul Islami As-Salafi Madrasa run by Ahle Hadith Andolon Bangladesh. He did not make a clear stand regarding Islamic militancy during his campaign and received support from Ahle Hadith Andolon Bangladesh. The principal of Al Markajul Islami As-Salafi Madrasa closed down the institute in 2009 and reported that Ahle Hadith Andolon Bangladesh was preaching extremism to the students. Students of University of Rajshahi and Rajshahi College were allowed to stay at the dormitories of the madrasa by Ghalib.

In April 2009, 49 leaders of the organisation resigned and formed the Ahle Hadith Jubo O Chhatra Parishad.

On 27 December 2015, leaders of Ahmadiyya Muslim community reported that their community faced harassment from Sunni Muslims, Ahle Hadith Andolon Bangladesh, Khatme Nabuwat Andolon Bangladesh, and Bangladesh Jamaat-e-Islami. Two of the attackers of July 2016 Dhaka attack were allegedly members of Ahle Hadith Andolon Bangladesh, but Asadullah Al Ghalib denied the allegations.

Ahle Hadith Andolon Bangladesh has reported links with terrorist group Jamaat-ul-Mujahideen Bangladesh; this has been denied by the leader of Ahle Hadith Andolon Bangladesh, Muhammad Asadullah Al-Ghalib, at a press conference at the Jatiya Press Club on 15 August 2016. Top leaders of Jamaat-ul-Mujahideen Bangladesh, Shaykh Abdur Rahman and Bangla Bhai, were members of Ahle Hadith Andolon Bangladesh.
