= Zia Uddin =

Bangladeshi Deobandi Islamic Scholar

Mufakkir-e-Islam Allama Zia Uddin Nazim Saheb Huzur

Advisor, Hefazat-e-Islam Bangladesh
- Incumbent
- Assumed office 15 November 2020

President, Azad Dini Adarah-e-Talim
- Incumbent
- Assumed office 15 June 2018
- Preceded by: Husayn Ahmad Barkuti

President, Jamiat Ulema-e-Islam Bangladesh
- Incumbent
- Assumed office 8 April 2020
- Preceded by: Abdul Momin Imambari

Director, Jamia Madania Angura-Muhammadpur
- Incumbent
- Assumed office 2010
- Preceded by: Shihab Uddin

Personal life
- Born: 4 April 1941 (age 85) Kakardia, Beanibazar, Sylhet District
- Children: 7
- Era: Modern
- Education: Darul Uloom Hathazari

Religious life
- Religion: Islam
- Denomination: Sunni
- Jurisprudence: Hanafi
- Tariqa: Chishti (Sabiri-Imdadi); Naqshbandi; Qadri; Suhrawardy
- Creed: Maturidi
- Movement: Deobandi

Muslim leader
- Disciple of: Abdul Matin Chowdhury
- Influenced by: Shah Ahmad Shafi
- Influenced: Manzurul Islam Effendi

Mufakkir al-Islām Ḍiyā' ad-Dīn ibn Muqaddas ʿAlī (Arabic: مفكر الإسلام ضياء الدين بن مقدس علي; born 4 April 1941), better known simply as Zia Uddin (Bengali: জিয়া উদ্দিন) or reverentially as Nazim Saheb Huzur (Bengali: নাজিম সাহেব হুজুর), is a Bangladeshi Deobandi Islamic scholar, politician and educationist. He is currently the president of Jamiat Ulema-e-Islam Bangladesh and Azad Dini Adarah-e-Talim, and an advisor to Hefazat-e-Islam Bangladesh. Uddin is also the director of Jamia Madania Angura-Muhammadpur and a member of Al-Haiatul Ulya Lil-Jamiatil Qawmia Bangladesh's permanent committee. He has played important roles in the 2013 Shapla Square protests and Khatme Nabuwwat movement, and has spoken out against the construction of the Tipaimukh Dam.

== Early life and education ==
Zia Uddin was born on 4 April 1941 to a Bengali Muslim family in the village of Kakardia in Beanibazar, Sylhet District. His father, Muqaddas Ali, was a hafiz of the Qur'an, and his mother's name was Khairunnessa Begum. He was the second child of a family of three sons and two daughters.

His education began with his family and in the local maktab of Kakardia. In 1953, he joined the village's primary school. Three years later, Uddin enrolled at the Mathiura Eidgah Bazar Madrasa. The following year, he joined the Darul Uloom Deulgram Madrasa where he completed his middle school studies. He then proceeded to study at Gachbari Jamiul Uloom Madrasa until 1962, before enrolling at Al-Jamiatul Ahlia Darul Ulum Moinul Islam in Hathazari. He passed his Master of Arts in Hadith studies from Hathazari in 1965, and studied tafsir (Quranic exegesis) the following year.

== Career ==
Zia Uddin giving a speech.

Uddin's career began in 1967 as a teacher at the Jamia Madania Angura-Muhammadpur. When Shihab Uddin, the founder of this madrasa, saw Zia Uddin's activeness, he gave him the role of education secretary. In 2010, Zia Uddin became the madrasa's director-general.

On 15 June 2018, he was elected the president of Azad Dini Adarah-e-Talim, the Qawmi education board of Sylhet Division. Thus, he became an ex officio member of Al-Haiatul Ulya Lil-Jamiatil Qawmia Bangladesh's permanent committee. In addition to this, he is the chief advisor to the Tanzimul Madaris Sylhet, as well as advisor of Madania Quran Education Board and Nurani Talimul Quran Board.

He is also the director of numerous madrasas including Jamia Qasimul Uloom Mewa, Jamia Hatimia Shibganj, Bahadurpur Jalalia Madrasa and Aqakhazana Women's Title Madrasa. Zia Uddin is advisor to several social, literary and cultural organisations like Ash-Shihab Parishad, IQRA Foundation UK, Al-Hilal Student's Union, Al-Qalam Research Council, Chetana Literary Society, Jagoron Islamic Cultural Society and Hizb-e-Elahi Beanibazar.

On 15 November 2020, he was elected as a member of the advising committee of Hefazat-e-Islam Bangladesh during its central gathering.

=== Political career ===
In the 1980s, Zia Uddin was the president of the Jamiat Ulema-e-Islam Bangladesh's student-wing Jamiat Talaba-e-Arabia's Sylhet branch. He was elected as the general secretary of the party's Beanibazar branch in 1987. In 1994, he was nominated as the JUI-B general secretary for the entire Sylhet District, and served as this for three terms. He was elected as an assistant secretary for the Jamiat in 2008. In 2011, he became the president of the party's Sylhet branch and served as this for three terms, too. In the same year, he was elected as vice-president for the Jamiat, and he was re-elected on 7 November 2015. After the death of Abdul Momin Imambari on 8 April 2020, Zia Uddin became the president of the nationwide party.

== Activism and controversy ==
During his studies at Darul Uloom Hathazari in 1961, Zia Uddin was shot as a result of taking part in a movement against Ayub Khan's "Muslim Family Laws" bill. In 1966, he was injured during a clash with the Barelvis of Chittagong. In the 1990s, he led the Ismat-e-Anbia and Khatme Nabuwwat movements in Beanibazar. Under his supervision and the care of Izhare Haq, the Beanibazar Khatme Nabuwat conference was held. He has also led movements such as the Taslima-Birodhi movement, SUSB naming movement and Fatwa legitimacy movement.

In 2005, he organised the Tipaimukh Sylhet Divisional Long March convened by the National Committee for Prevention of Aggression against the Government of India's plans to establish Tipaimukh Dam. On 8 December 2011, he was responsible for the Jamiat road march against Tipaimukh Dam. In 2008, he led the movement of the Quranic Law Preservation Committee in Sylhet against the women's development policy. In 2013, Shahjalal University of Science and Technology decided not to construct any statues as a result of the Shah Jalal Heritage Preservation Committee led by Zia Uddin.

He played a key role in the Shane Resalat Sammelan held in Sylhet on the initiative of Hefazat-e-Islam Bangladesh. He addressed the long march of Hefazat in Dhaka on 6 April 2013. On 5 May 2013, he participated in the Shapla Square protests, and six cases were subsequently filed against him. He served as the Acting President of the Azad Dini Adarah-e-Talim's International Turban Tying Conference from 9 to 11 February 2012.

== Awards and recognition ==
- Mufakkir-e-Islam (8 August 2019), Ash-Shihab Parishad dedicated this book on his life and works
- Birmingham, United Kingdom, 16 May 2017
- In 2016, in recognition of his achievements in teaching, he was given a special honour by online organisation.

== Personal life and Sufism ==
He completed spiritual studies with Abdul Matin Chowdhury of Fulbari. During an iʿtikāf at Al-Masjid an-Nabawi, Chowdhury declared to his khalifa (spiritual successor), Abdus Sabur, that he has also made Zia Uddin his khalifa. Zia Uddin has one son and six daughters.

== Bibliography ==
- Inqilab 1
- Inqilab 2
