= Padmanath Bhattacharya =

Indian historian

Pandit Padmanath Bhattacharya Vidya Vinod
- পদ্মনাথ ভট্টাচার্য
- Born: 1868; Baniachong, Sylhet district, Bengal Presidency
- Died: 1938 (aged 69–70); British Raj
- Education: Dhaka College
- Occupation: Historian
- Writing career
- Subject: Ancient history
- Notable works: Kamarupa Sasanavali; Mr. Gait's History of Assam: A Critical Study

Padmanath Bhattacharya (Bengali: পদ্মনাথ ভট্টাচার্য; 1868-1938) was an Indian historian. His works generally centred on the ancient Kamrup region. The Padmanath Vidyabinod Memorial Awards are named after him.

== Early life and education ==
Bhattacharya was born in 1868, to a Hindu family in the village of Baniachong in Sylhet district, Bengal Presidency (now part of Bangladesh). The neighbourhood where he was born is now known as Vidyabhushan Para.

He passed his matriculation examinations in 1880, topping the scores across the newly-established North-East Frontier (Assam) province. He then completed his Bachelor of Arts with honours from Dacca College in 1890, having studied English, Sanskrit and philosophy. In recognition of Bhattacharya's talent, he was conferred the titles of Swaraswati and Vidyavinod. In 1892, he completed a Master of Arts in English.

== Career ==
Bhattacharya started his career as a professor at the Murari Chand College in Sylhet where he taught English, Sanskrit, logic and history. He later joined the Assam Secretariat, and was appointed as the Deputy Inspector of the Province's Surma Valley Division in 1897. In 1901, he was promoted as a Governmental Censor Superintendent. From there, Bhattacharya joined the Guwahati College as professor of Sanskrit and History. The government awarded him the title of Mahamahopadhyaya (Great Professor). In 1911, he founded the Vangiya Anusandhan Samiti which led to many discoveries with regards to the history of South Asia. Bhattacharya also defended criticisms of Bengali Muslims, in addition to his own community. His article, Bhranti Nirash, was a response to Prafulla Chandra Ray's Bangali Mastisker Apabyabahar which attacked Hinduism and the Hindu society. Bhattacharya was also supportive to other researchers in the field, and was known to have donated five thousand takas in 1910 to fund Achyut Charan Choudhury's Srihatter Itibritta series.

Bhattacharya became a leading Sanskrit scholar in the Assam Province. He was regularly involved in the discovery and deciphering of numerous Kamarupa inscriptions, such as the Nidhanpur copperplate inscription. He was also the first academic to write a scholarly article on the Sylhet Nagri script, and has also researched about Shashanka and the Gauda Kingdom. Bhattacharya served as a professor in Cotton College and was one of the founding members of Kamarupa Anusandhan Samiti. He was critical and dissatisfied with Gait's perception of historical events and processes of Assam, and his interpretations, constructed meaning and political undertone in his works.

== Authored works ==
Bhattacharya's notable works are Parshuramkunda O Badarikashrama Paribhramana (1914), Kamarupa Shasanavali (1931), Ramakrishna-Vivekananda Prasanga (1924) and Mr. Gait's History of Assam: A Critical Study. He has also written articles that can be found in Epigraphia Indica vol. XII, as well as for the Sahitya Parisad Patrika. In 1931, he submitted his collection of 37 Bhatta poems and biographies of Bhatta poets to the Srihatta Sahitya Parishad.

== Death ==
Bhattacharya died in his own home in Baniachong.

== See also ==
- Jatindramohan Bhattacharya
