= Muhammad Asadullah Al-Ghalib =

Bangladeshi Islamic scholar, and theologian (1925-2001)

Muhammad Asadullah Al-Ghalib مُحَمَّد اَسَدُ اللّه اَلْغاَلِب
- মুহাম্মাদ আসাদুল্লাহ আল-গালিব
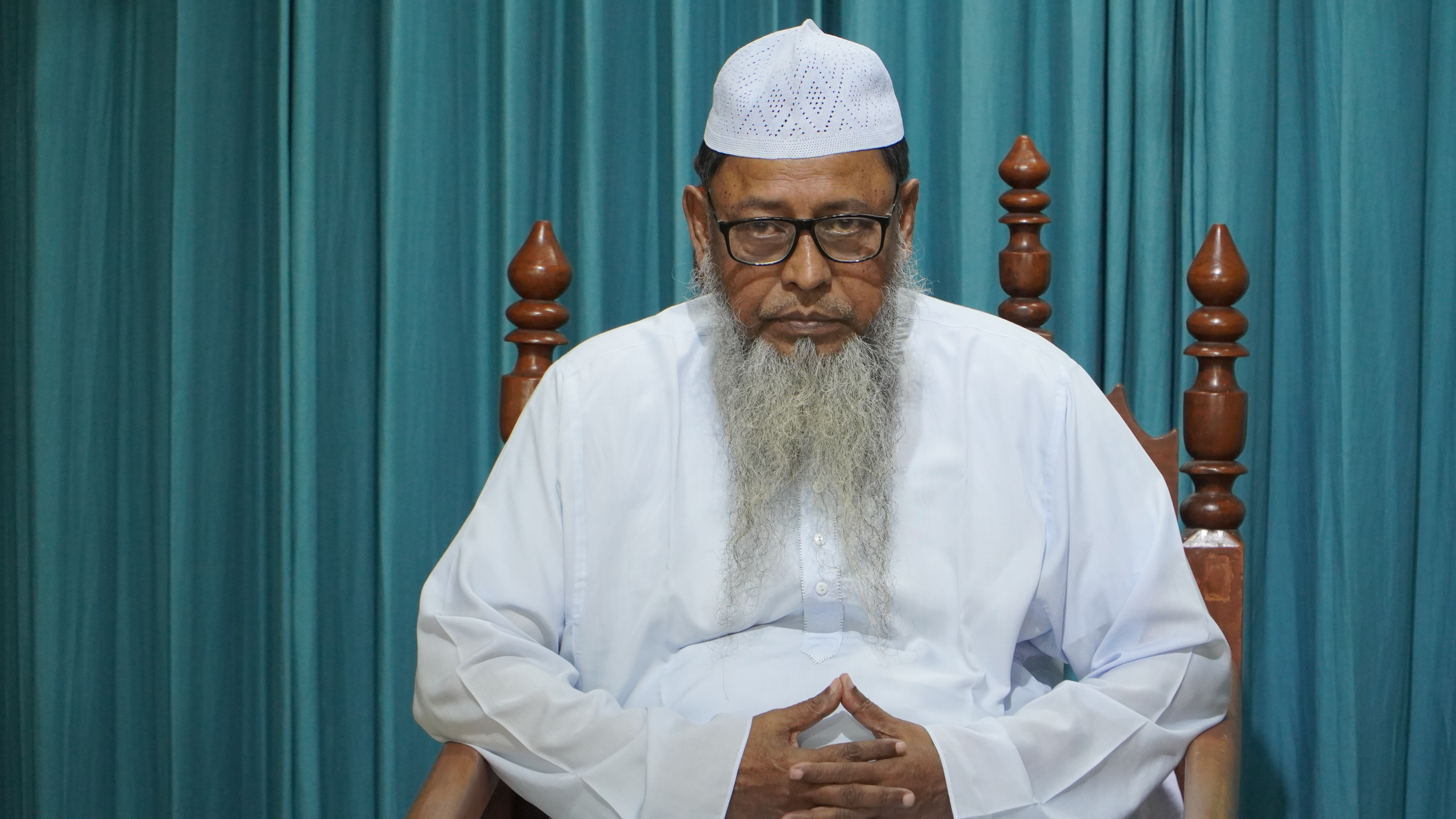

Personal life
- Born: 15 January 1948 (age 78) Bularati, Satkhira, East Pakistan
- Home town: Satkhira
- Spouse: Tahirunnesa
- Children: Dr. Tamanna Tasnim; Dr. Ahmad Abdullah Saqib; Dr. Ahmad Abdullah Najib; Ahmad Abdullah Shakir
- Parent: Maulana Ahmad Ali Basirunnesa
- Notable work(s): Tafsirul Quran; Tarjamatul Quran; Siratur Rasul (SM); Salatur Rasul (SM); Ahlehadith Movement: its Origin and Development with Special Reference to the South Asian Region (PhD Thesis)
- Education: Dhaka University; PhD; M.A and B.A (Hons) in Arabic Language and Literature
- Website: asadullahalghalib.com

Religious life
- Religion: Islam
- Denomination: Sunni
- Founder of: Ahlehadeeth Movement Bangladesh
- Sect: Ahle Hadith/Salafi
- Profession: Islamic Scholar; Professor (Rtd.); Author; Mufassir; Muhaddith; Faqih; Historiographer

Muhammad Asadullah Al-Ghalib (Bengali: মুহম্মদ আসাদুল্লাহ আল-গালিব; born 15 January 1948) is a Bangladeshi reformist Islamic scholar, educator, reformist preacher, and former professor of Arabic at the University of Rajshahi. He is best known as the founder and Ameer (President) of the Ahlehadeeth Andolon Bangladesh, a Salafi Islamic reform movement. He is also the founder of several Islamic educational and charitable institutions across Bangladesh. He is also the founder of an Islamic research journal, Monthly At-tahreek.

On 23 February 2005, the Bangladesh government arrested him following allegations of Islamic militancy. He was further alleged to have received funding from the Society of the Revival of Islamic Heritage. However, he denied any involvement with Islamic militancy and was freed from jail on 28 August 2008. He was eventually acquitted of all charges.

== Founded organisations ==
He has founded various religious, educational and non-profit social welfare organizations in Bangladesh.

- Ahlehadeeth Andolon Bangladesh ( Ahlehadeeth Movement Bangladesh) – A national Ahlehadeeth organisation, Founded on Friday, 23 September 1994.
- Bangladesh Ahlehadeeth Jubo Shangha – A youths' wing of Ahlehadeeth Movement Bangladesh, founded on 5 February 1978.
- Bangladesh Ahlehadeeth Mahilla Songstha - A ladies' wing of Ahlehadeeth Movement Bangladesh, Founded on 7 June 1981.
- Tawheed Trust (Regd) – A registered non-profit social welfare well-known organization, which is based in Rajshahi, Bangladesh, opened on 5 September 1989.
- Salafiyah Trust (Regd) - A registered social welfare organization, founded in 2002.
- Hadeeth Foundation Bangladesh – An Islamic research foundation with Darul Ifta and publishing house, founded on 15 November 1992.
- Islamic Complex - Founded in 2010.
- Monthly at-Tahreek – An Islamic research journal first published in September 1997. In an interview in 2017, Dr. Shakhawat Hossain, Ahl-e Hadith Andolon Bangladesh spokesperson, said the group claimed its lineage and the inspiration for its name from Islamist groups that had fought British colonialism in the early 19th century.
- Sonamoni - A children's wing of Ahlehadeeth Movement Bangladesh, founded in 1994.
- Pather Alo Foundation - A national project for orphans, sightless, disabled and neglected people. It is founded in 2009.

== Works ==
- Tarjamatul Quran
- Tafsirul Quran

== Views ==
In 2005, in conjunction with the protests led by the chief cleric, Ubaidul Haq, he led a protest in Rajshahi to condemn a series of bombings.

== Arrest and Acquittal ==
In 2005, Dr. Ghalib was arrested by the Bangladeshi government under allegations of militancy, which he and his organization strongly denied. After extended legal proceedings, he was acquitted of all charges, and no evidence was found linking him to extremist activities. The case is widely seen by his followers as politically motivated.

== Legacy and Influence ==
Ghalib is widely regarded as a reformer and a leading figure in the revival of hadith-centric puritan Islam in Bangladesh. His movement has played a major role in promoting authentic Islamic education, organizing religious seminars, and establishing humanitarian services.

His leadership continues to influence younger scholars and students who align themselves with the Salafi and Ahl-e-Hadith ideology.

== See also ==
- Shirk
- Bid‘ah
- Ibn Taymiyyah
- Ibn Qayyim al-Jawziyya
- Muhammad Nasiruddin al-Albani
- Syed Nazeer Husain Dehlawi
- Ehsan Elahi Zaheer
- Abd al-Aziz ibn Baz
- Muhammad ibn al Uthaymeen
- Zakir Naik
- Abdur Raheem Green
