= A Kind of English =

- Directed by: Ruhul Amin
- Written by: Paul Hallam
- Produced by: Richard Taylor
- Starring: Lalita Ahmed; Jamil Ali; Afroza Bulbul; Badsha Haq; Andrew Johnson
- Cinematography: Jonathan Collinson
- Edited by: Richard Taylor
- Music by: Lucy Rahman
- Release date: 1986
- Running time: 75 minutes
- Country: United Kingdom
- Languages: English; Bengali

A Kind of English is a 1986 British drama film, directed by Ruhul Amin and written by Paul Hallam. It stars Lalita Ahmed, Jamil Ali, Afroza Bulbul, Badsha Haq and Andrew Johnson. The film is about a Bengali family living in London.

== Cast ==
- Lalita Ahmed as Mariom
- Jamil Ali as Samir
- Afroza Bulbul as Shahanara
- Badsha Haq as Chan
- Andrew Johnson as Tariq

== Production ==
The film was directed by Ruhul Amin and produced by Richard Taylor. Paul Hallam wrote the screenplay based on Amin's concept. Fire House produced the music, while Lucy Rahman sang the songs. The film debuted in 1986 at the BFI London Film Festival.

== Reception ==
A Kind of English was shown in festivals around the world and earned critical acclaim. The film was compared with early work of De Sica and Satyajit Ray.

Variety reviewer Adam praised the film, writing, "the small cast performs well" but thought that the actor portraying Samir, Jamil Ali, "acts functionally, but has an irritating squarky voice". He concluded, "Ruhul Amin has constructed the film well, and sensibly not relied on obvious scenes of racial attack to portray the problems of the immigrant community, instead giving all the characters a dignity which presents itself in varying ways. Technical credits are fine."

Hugh Hebert of The Guardian called A King of English "gentle" and "ironic" and thought it was "a small, beautifull understated film". The Norwich Evening News said it was a "gentle drama". Alan Kersey of Cambridge Evening News found it to be "a poignant look at a Bengali boy growing up in the alternately friendly and hostile environment of London's East End" and said it was a "fine debut" by the director.

== See also ==
- Brick Lane
