= Muhiuddin Khan =

Bangladeshi Islamic scholar

Mawlana Muhiuddin Khan

Personal life
- Born: 19 April 1935 Chhaychir, Kishoreganj District, Bengal Province
- Died: 25 June 2016 (aged 81) Bangladesh
- Main interest: Tafseer
- Notable idea(s): Seerat Literature, Practicing Islamic Literature in Bengali
- Notable work(s): Mashik Madina, Translation of Maariful Qur'an
- Education: Govt. Madrasah-e-Alia, Dhaka

Religious life
- Religion: Islam
- Denomination: Sunni
- Jurisprudence: Hanafi
- Movement: Deobandi

Muslim leader
- Teacher: Abdur Rahman Kashgari
- Disciple of: Abdul Momin Imambari
- Influenced: Humayun Ahmed

Secretary-General, Jamiat Ulema-e-Islam Bangladesh
- In office 1976–1978
- Preceded by: Shamsuddin Qasemi
- Succeeded by: Shamsuddin Qasemi

Executive President, Jamiat Executive Council
- In office 1996–2000
- Preceded by: Shamsuddin Qasemi
- Succeeded by: Ashraf Ali Bishwanathi

Acting President, Jamiat Executive Council
- In office 20 May 2005 – 4 September 2005
- Preceded by: Ashraf Ali Bishwanathi
- Succeeded by: Abdul Momin Imambari

Executive President, Jamiat Executive Council
- In office 26 June 2008 – 18 June 2012
- Preceded by: Ashraf Ali Bishwanathi
- Succeeded by: Mustafa Azad

Muhiuddin Khan (Bengali: মুহিউদ্দিন খান; 1935–2016) was an Islamic scholar from Bangladesh and editor of Monthly Madina. Khan was also a Quranic commentator, journalist, poet, writer and translator. He translated for the first time tafseer Maariful Quran into Bengali.

== Early life and education ==
Khan was born on 19 April 1935 at the home of his maternal grandfather in the village of Chhaychir in Pakundia, Kishoreganj District, Bengal Province. His mother's name was Mosammat Rabeya Khatun. Khan belonged to a Bengali Muslim family originally from Ansarnagar in Gafargaon, Mymensingh District. His father, Hakim Ansaruddin Khan, was an educationist and moulvi.

Khan passed Aalim in 1951 and Fazil in 1953 from the madrasa. In 1953, he was admitted to Govt. Madrasah-e-Alia, Dhaka where he studied under Abdur Rahman Kashgari and other scholars. In 1955, Khan received the Kamil degree in Hadith and in 1956 he got a Kamil degree in fiqh from the madrasa.

== Career ==
Khan edited Weekly Naya Jamana in 1960, Monthly Dishari from 1963 to 1970. From 1961 until his death, he served as the editor of Monthly Madina and Aaj (Today). Khan was appointed a member of the central executive committee of Saudi-based international organization Rabataye Aalame Islami in 1988. He has been honored as a well-known writer in West Bengal, Assam, Tripura. He was the president of Mutamar al-Alam Al-Islami Bangladesh unit, the founder chairman of the Jatiya Seerat Committee of Bangladesh, the chairman of the Nastik-Murtad Protirud Andolon Islami Murcha, and the leader of Jamiate Ulamae Islam.

Khan co-operated and assisted the Bengali freedom fighters during the Bangladesh Liberation War of 1971. In December 1976, the Jamiat Ulema-e-Islam Bangladesh held a conference at the Patuakhali Jame Mosque in which Azizul Haque was made the party's president and Khan as its general-secretary. Khan resigned from this post in 1978. However, at the Jamiat Central Council of 1996, Khan was appointed as the executive president of a 51-member executive council. After the death of the council's erstwhile president, Ashraf Ali Bishwanathi, on 20 May 2005, Khan was given the responsibility as acting president.

== Works ==
Khan wrote, edited and published Islamic literature in Bangla. He gave the realization of the fact that Muhammad can be a separate topic of literature, and it can be unique. Today, Seerat Literature is a rich section of Bengali language. He has translated and compiled nearly 105 books. He translated the eight volume Tafsir book Maarreef al Quran of Muhammad Shafi from Urdu to Bengali. It is published from the Islamic Foundation Bangladesh. In 1413 Hijri, the King Fahd Quran printing project of Madinah distributed the Tafseer printing in one volume in Bengali to the Bengali speakers throughout the world free of cost. Khan translated Al-Ghazali's Ihyau Ulumuddin and Abul Kalam Azad's Insaniat Mawt ki Darwaje Por (The form of humanity in the face of death). His established Madina Publications has published 600 quality books from the year 1957 in various subjects including the Quran, Hadith, Seerat-e Rasool, history, tradition and dictionary.

List of books written or translated by Muhiuddin Khan

- Islam and Our Life (ইসলাম ও আমাদের জীবন)
- The Right Path (সিরাতুল মুস্তাকীম)
- Maariful Qur'an (মারেফুল কোরআন সংক্ষিপ্ত বাংলা অনুবাদ সহ)
- Holy Jamjam (জান্নাতের অমীয়ধারা পবিত্র যমযম)
- Tajreedul Bukhari(তজরীদুল বোখারী)
- Azadi Movement 1857 (আযাদী আন্দোলন-১৮৫৭)
- Extra-Ordinary Incidents of Prophet Muhammad's Life (খাসায়েসুল কুবরা: নবী (সা:) জীবনের অত্যাশ্চর্য ঘটনাবলী )
- Biography of Prophet Muhammad's (সীরাতুন নবী)

== See also ==
- List of Deobandis
