= Museum of Rajas' =

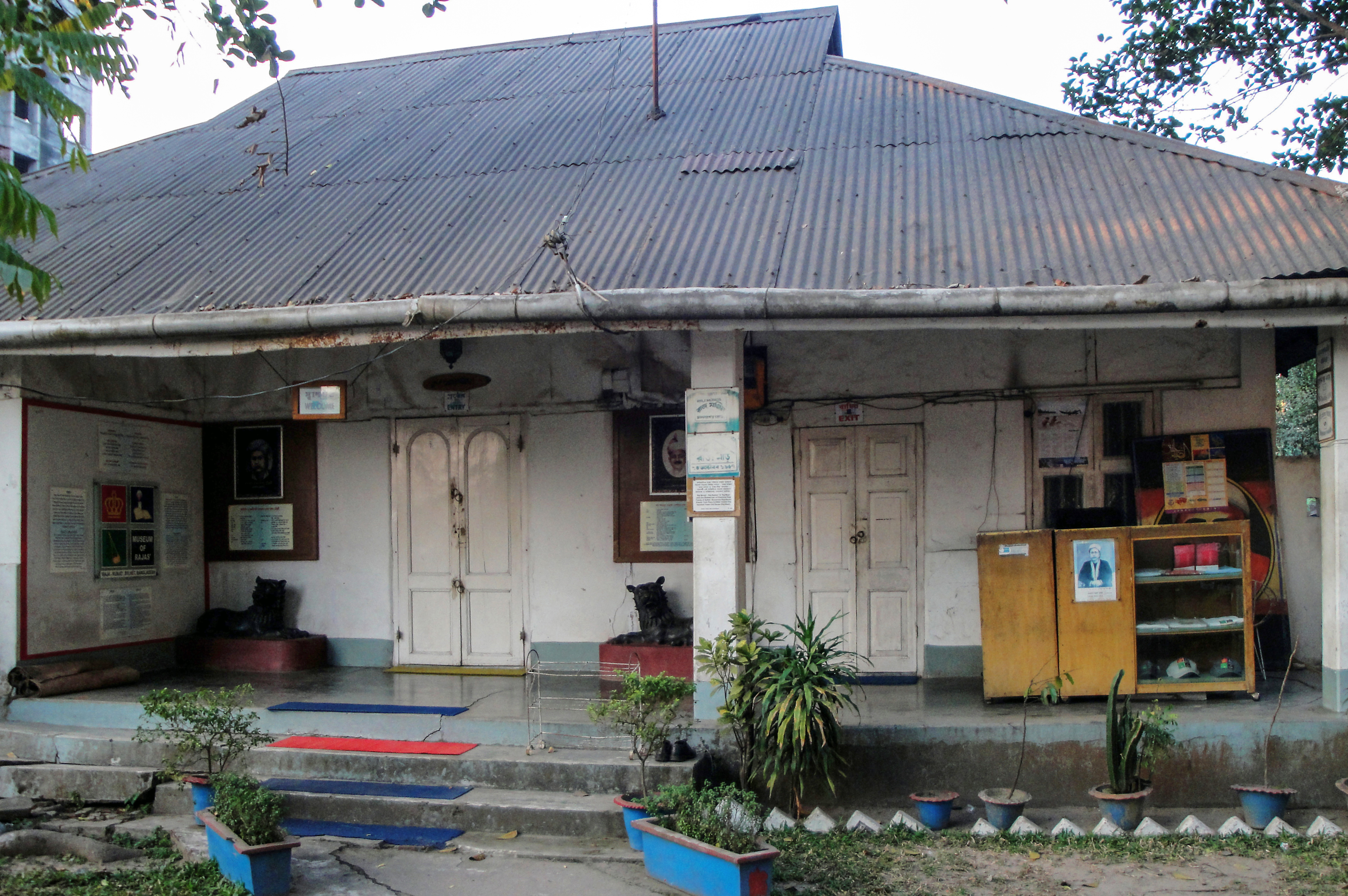

- Location within Bangladesh
- Established: 30 June 2006
- Location: "Raja-Kunjo", Zinda Bazar, Sylhet, Bangladesh
- Coordinates: 24.8949°N 91.8673°E
- Type: Folk museum

Museum of Rajas' is a folk museum in Sylhet, Bangladesh.

The predecessor's home of Hason Raja has been transformed into today's famous Museum of Rajas', commonly known as Hason Raja Museum. It is situated at the heart (Zinda Bazar) of the Sylhet City Corporation area in Sylhet Division of Bangladesh. It is about 10 kilometres (6.2 mi) from the Sylhet Osmany International Airport and 5 kilometres (3.1 mi) from the Sylhet Railway Station. Maintained and organized by the Educationist Dewan Talibur Raja Trust, named after the grandson of Dewan Hason Raja. The museum's mission is to preserve and share the rich history of the great Raja Family of Sylhet keeping the Zamindar and Mystic poet Dewan Hason Raja Chowdhury (1854–1922) in the center, and the folk literature, folk music and mystic poets of Sylhet Division. The museum promotes a greater public awareness of the rich cultural legacy of Sylhet. In pursuit of these goals, this museum collects archival materials related to Bangla folk literature, music and poets from the greater Sylhet region, and preserves these collections in a repository, open to the public. The museum also encourages and facilitates research on folk literature and history. The results of this research are made available to the public through museum exhibits, publications and presentations. It was formally inaugurated on 30 June 2006 by thousands of folk loving people by playing "Ek Tara" (a folk musical instrument) together, which was a unique event of this kind.

'Raja-Kunjo' is a hundred years old tin shade building having few rooms and other amenities including a piazza in the front. One has to cross few meters from the main gate to reach the Museum. Portraits of Hason Raja and his son Dewan Eklimur Raja Chowdhury (1889–1964) are placed in the entrance to greet the visitors. Receptionist/ Museum Assistants welcomes the guests and conducts guided tour. This historic museum comprises two galleries, where historical artifacts and a good number of photographs are preserved.

== Gallery 1 (Main Hall) ==
The entire room has been decorated with various historical showpieces. There are four big showcases containing the items related to Dewan Hason Raja and his family members, huge and rare collection of folk musical instruments, artifacts of Hason Raja movie (recipient of the best movie award 2002) and various folk and mystic poets. The 75 kilograms (165 lb) locker attracts all visitors and is placed in the center. One shall get the names of the pets (Horses, Elephants and Kora Birds) of Hason Raja.

== Gallery 2 ==
Almost all the books, so far published on Hason Raja and Eklimur Raja (Kabbo Bisharod) are displayed in this room. There are few furniture also made of wood, which includes chair, table, dressing table, etc. There are few small showcases filled with many valuable and historical items.

== Management ==
This establishment is looked after by Educationist Dewan Talibur Raja Trust. The chief patrons are Syeda Mina Raja, Fatema Nahreen Raja, Fatema Nazrin Raja, Dewan Mohammad Tasawwar Raja and Mosleha Monira Raja.

== Gallery ==
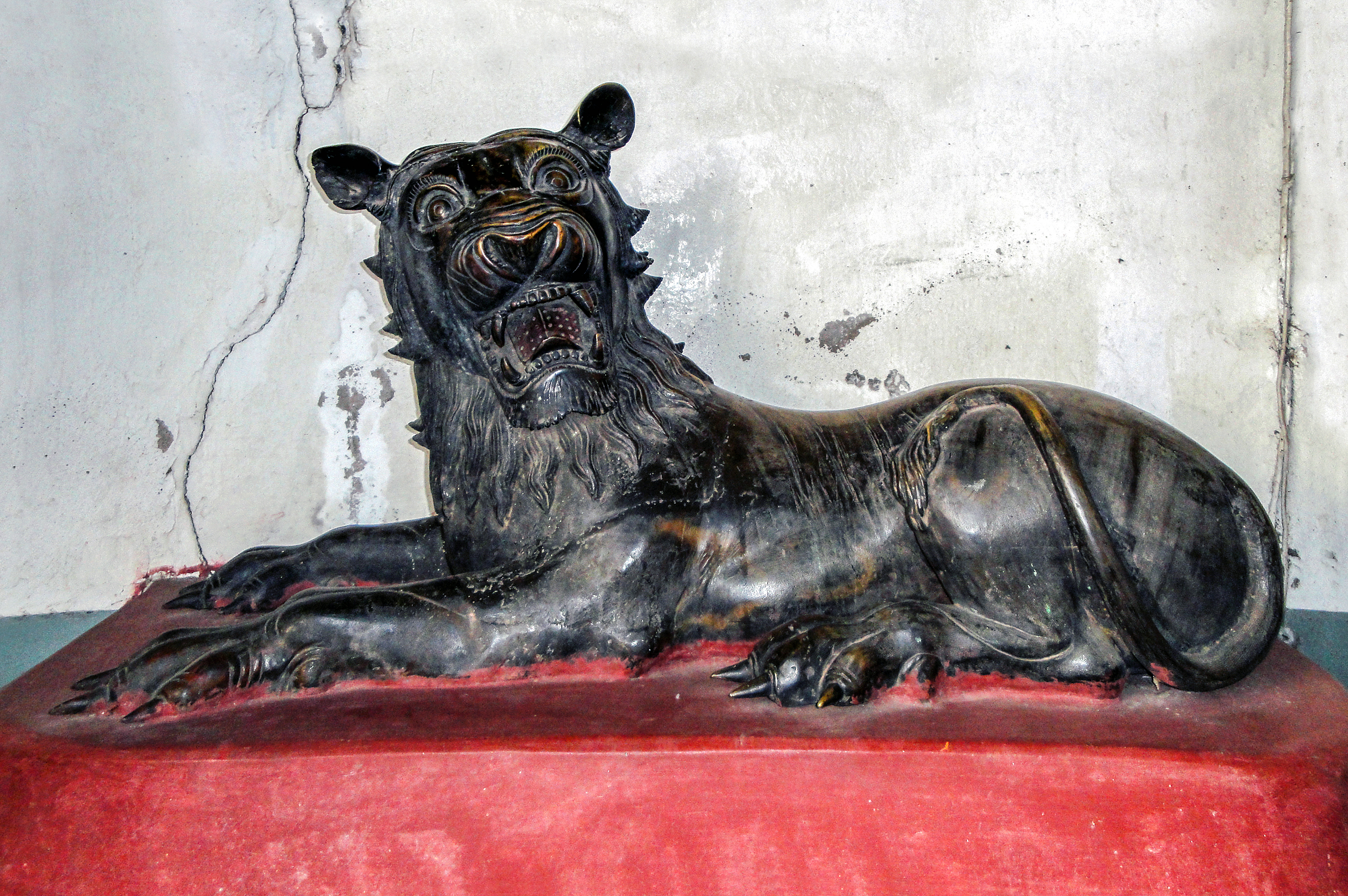
Statue of tiger

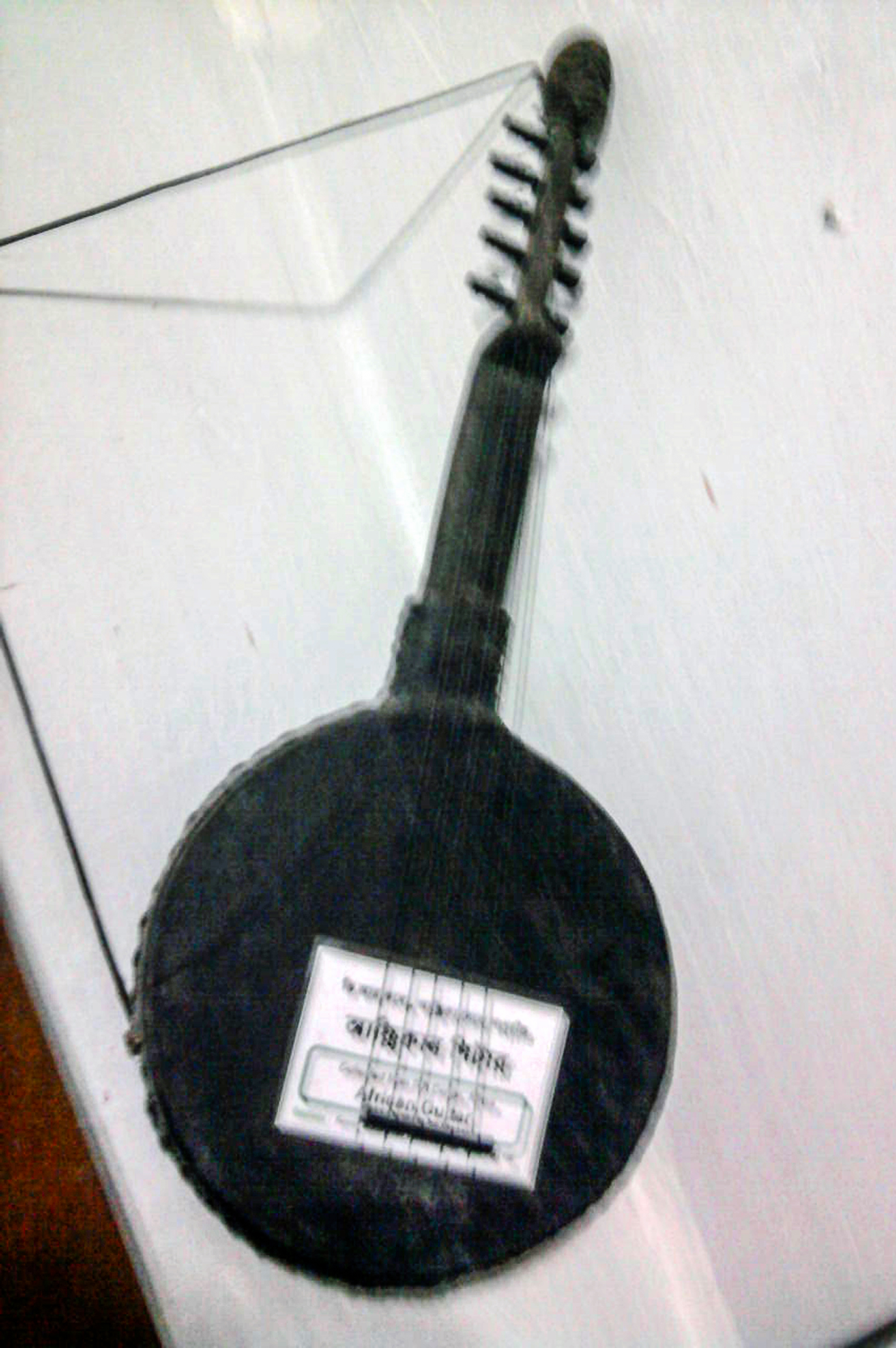
African guitar

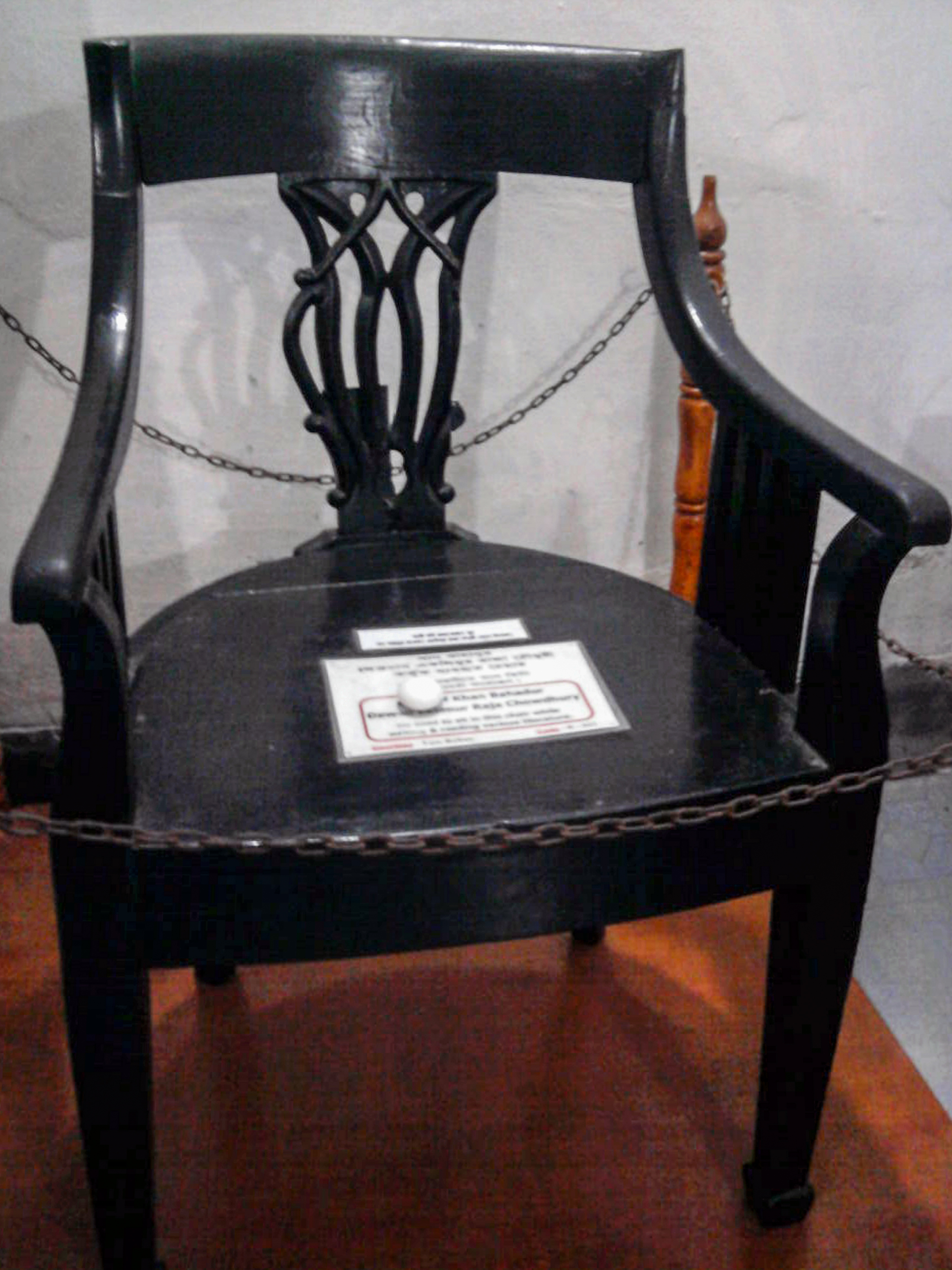
Chair of Dewan Eklimur Raja Chowdhury

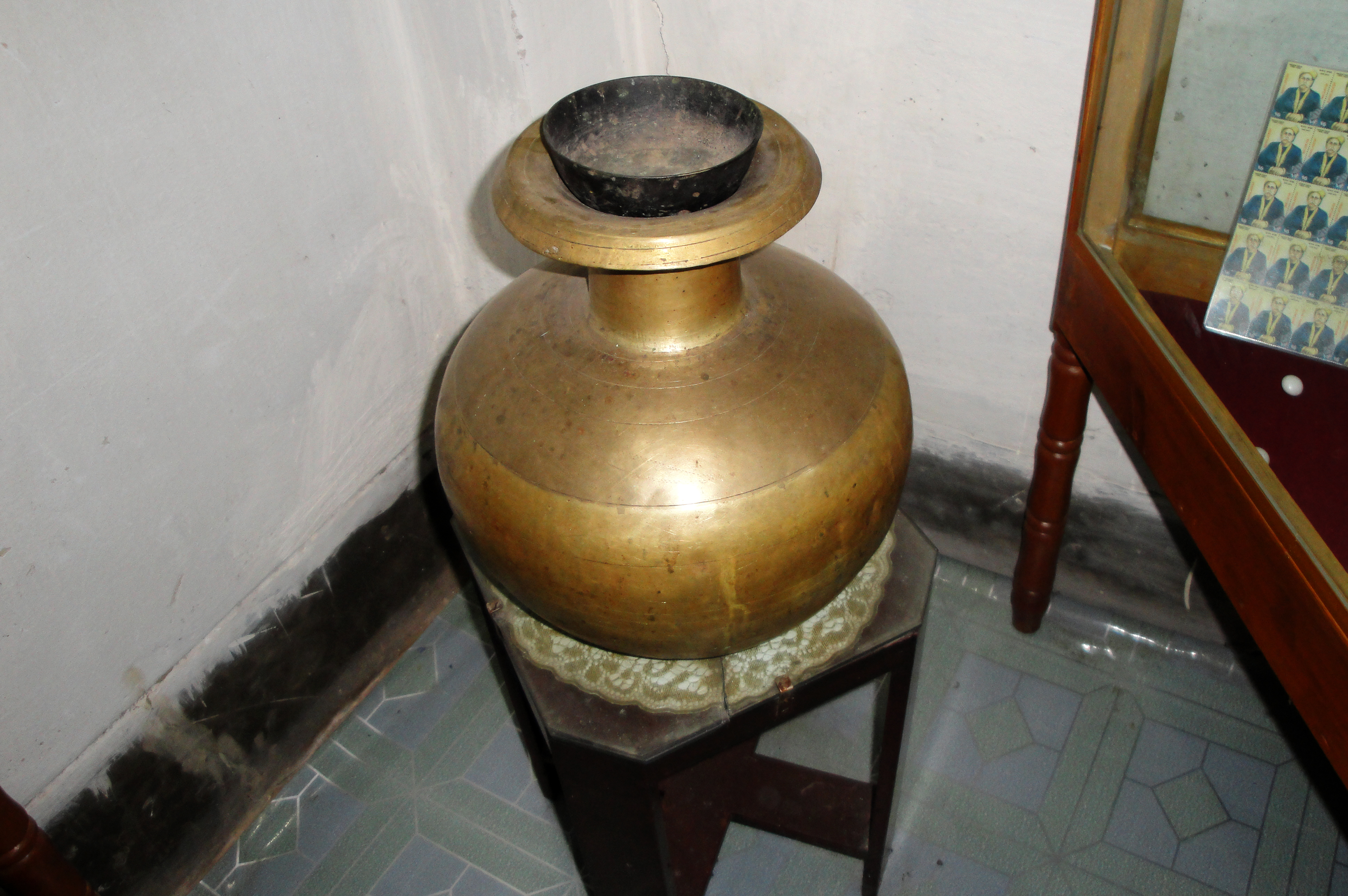
Hason Raja's Pitcher

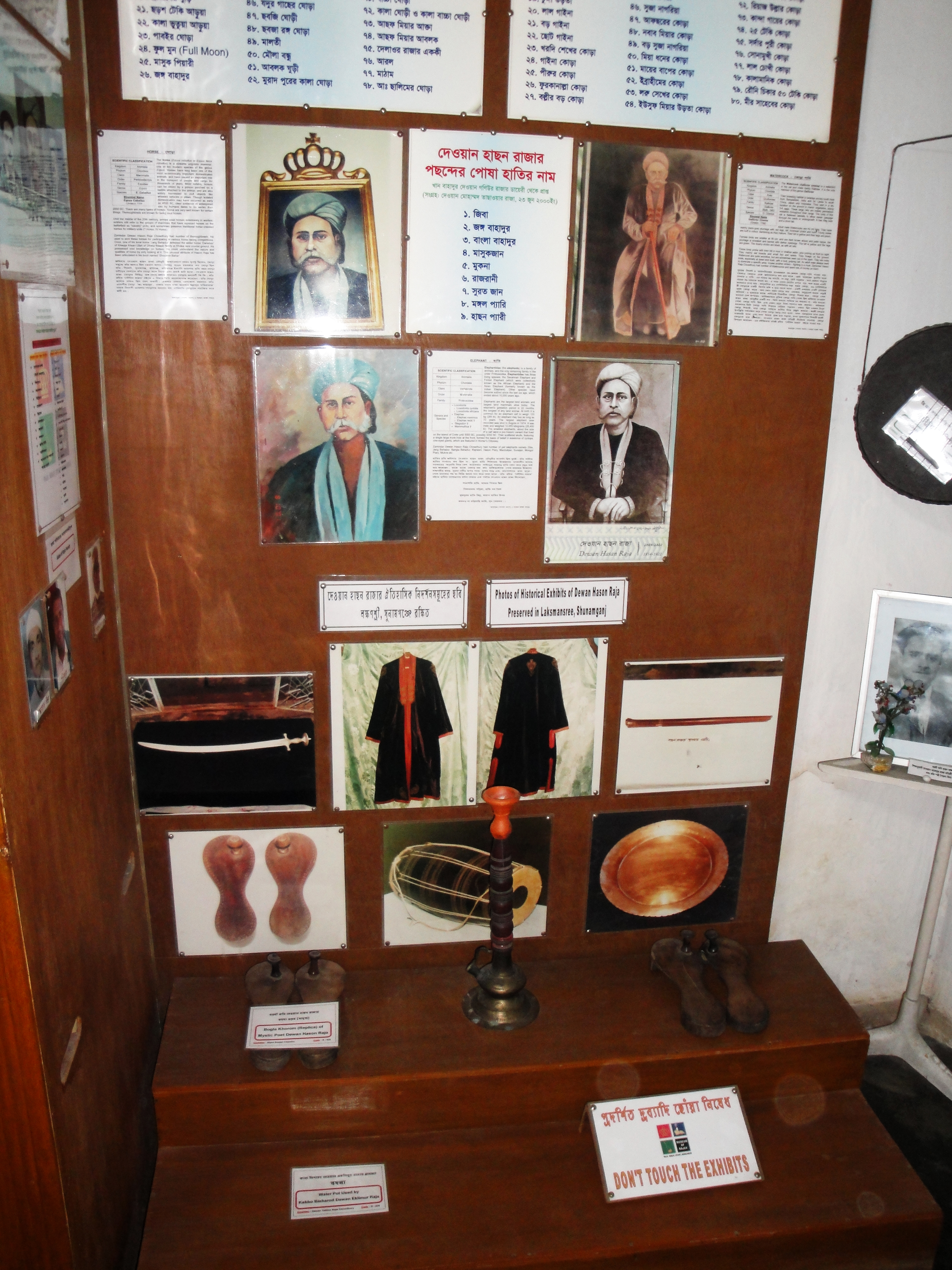
Historical showpieces

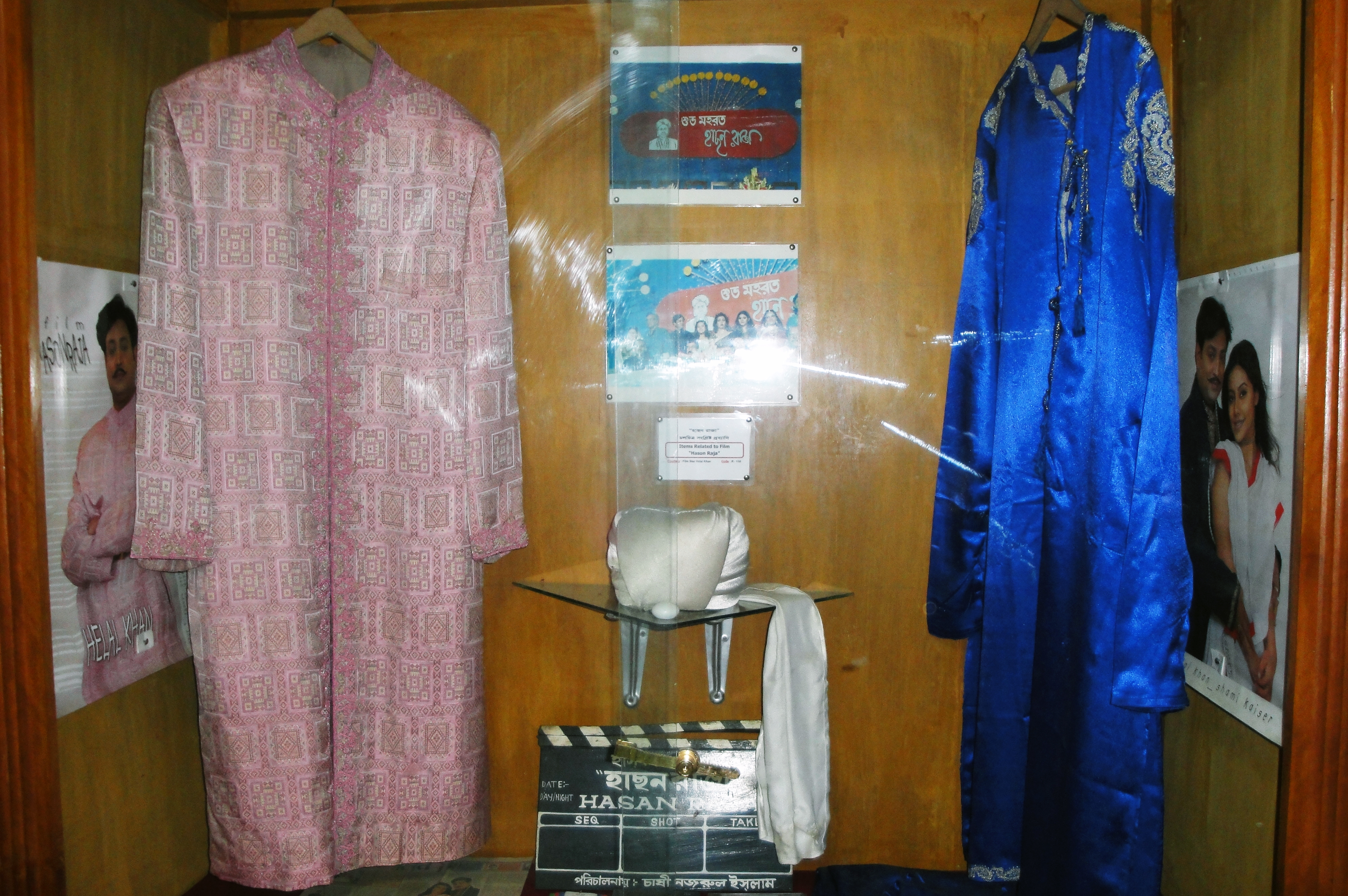
Items related to film Hason Raja

Mouth of the Lion

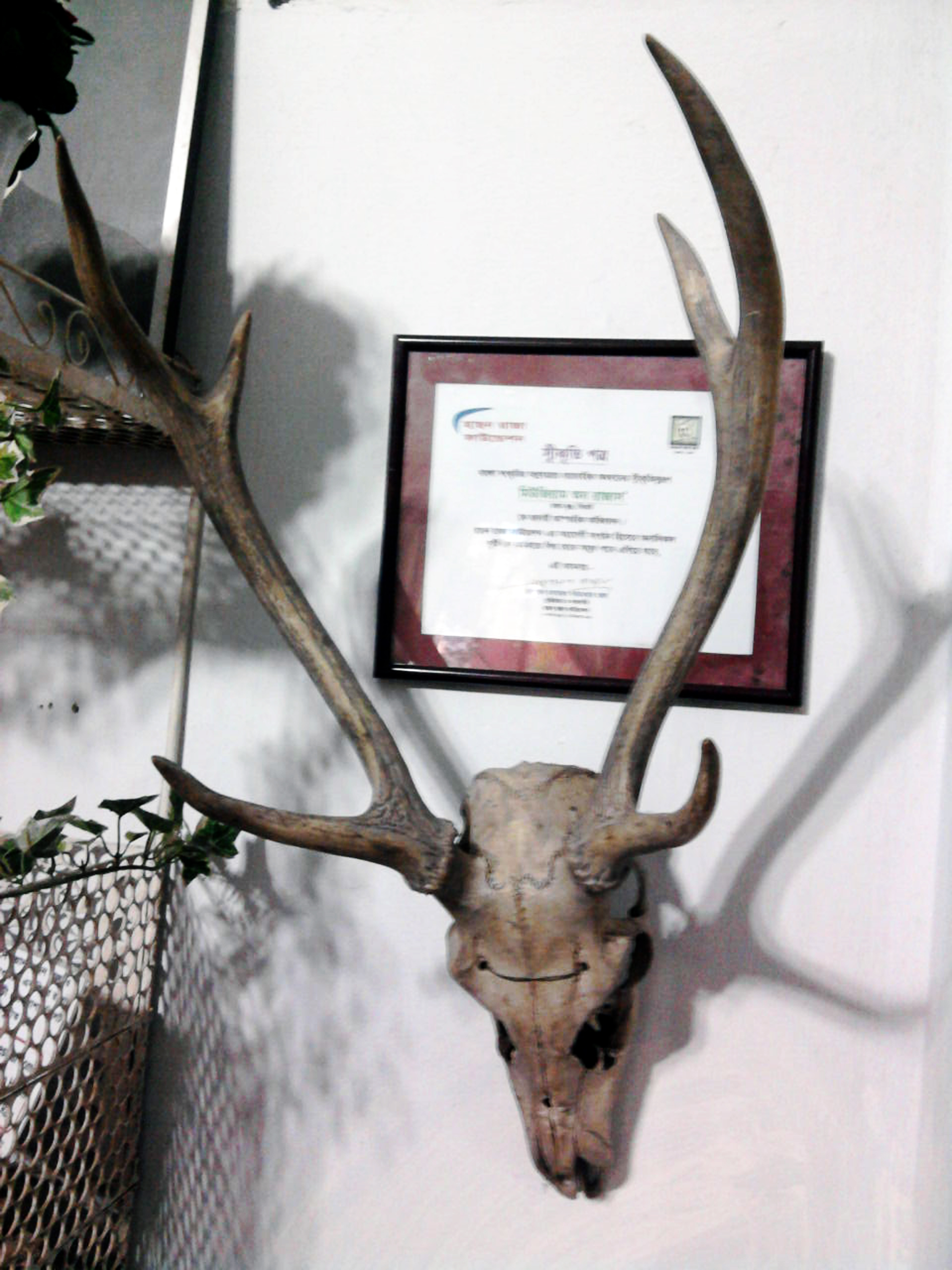
Skull of a Deer
