= Rampasha Union =

Rampasha রামপাশা
- Village
- Location of Rampasha in Bangladesh
- Coordinates: 24.8579°N 91.7277°E
- Country: Bangladesh
- Division: Sylhet
- District: Sylhet
- Upazila: Bishwanath
- Union council: Rampasha
- Demonym: Rampashi

Rampasha Union (Bengali: রামপাশা ইউনিয়ন) is a union parishad under Bishwanath Upazila of Sylhet District in north-east Bangladesh. It is famous for being the ancestral home of Hason Raja, a zamindar and prominent Bengali songwriter.

== Geography ==
Rampasha Union has a total area of 6,292 acres (2,546 ha). It borders Khajanchi Union to the north, Alankari and Bishwanath unions to the west, Daulatpur Union to the south and west, and Lamakazi Union to the northwest.

== Demographics ==
According to the 2011 Bangladesh census, Rampasha Union had 3,072 households and a population of 37,014. Islam was the majority religion (98.1% of the population). Hindus were the second-largest religious community (1.8% of the population). 12.8% of the population was under the age of 5. The literacy rate (age 7 and over) was 42.3%, compared to the national average of 51.8%.

== Education ==
There is one college in the union, Uttar Bishwanath Amjod Ullah College, and one secondary school, Eklimiah Di-Pakkhik High School.

== Notable people ==
- Hason Raja, mystic and songwriter
