= Jatindramohan Bhattacharya =

Author, researcher and professor

Jatindramohan Bhattacharya Tattva Ratnakara
- যতীন্দ্রমোহন ভট্টাচার্য
- Born: 1908; Singerkach, Bishwanath, Sylhet District
- Died: 1999 (aged 90–91); Calcutta, West Bengal
- Known for: Literary researcher and educationist
- Parents: Yaminikanta Bhattacharya (father); Mokshada Devi (mother)
- Awards: D.Litt. from Rabindra Bharati University

Academic background
- Education: Murari Chand College (BA, 1929); University of Calcutta (MA, 1931)

Academic work
- Institutions: Jadavpur University; Calcutta University; Cotton College
- Notable works: Bangla Puthir Talika Shomonnoy; Gopal Thakurer Podaboli; Banglar Boishnob Bhabaponno Musolman Kobi; Bangla Obhidhan Gronther Porichoy

Jatindramohan Bhattacharya (Bengali: যতীন্দ্রমোহন ভট্টাচার্য; 1908–1999) was an author and researcher of Bengali and Assamese literature. He served as the professor of Bengali at the University of Calcutta for many years.

== Early life and family ==
Bhattacharya was born in 1908, to a Bengali Hindu family in the village of Singerkach in Bishwanath, Sylhet District, Eastern Bengal and Assam. His father, Yaminikanta Bhattacharya, was a local mirashdar, (Note: Mirashdar is a term referring to a landowner who pays taxes directly to the government.) and his mother, Mokshada Devi, died when he was only one years old.

== Education ==
After studying in the local village school, Bhattacharya moved to Meghalaya where he was educated at the Shillong Government High School. He passed his matriculation in 1925, and proceeded to study at the Murari Chand College of Sylhet from where he graduated in 1929. He later completed a Master of Arts in Bengali at the University of Calcutta, graduating with a first class in 1931.

== Career ==
From 1933 to 1941, Bhattacharya was a Ramtanu Lahiri research assistant. He became an assistant lecture of Bengali at the University of Calcutta in 1939, and remained in this post until 1941. He then returned to Sylhet, to work at Murari Chand College. In 1943, Bhattacharya joined the Cotton College in Guwahati, Assam and was promoted to Head of Bengali in 1952. In 1964, he left that position and spent six years as Reader Head at the PG Bengali Department of Gauhati University. After the independence of Bangladesh in 1971, Bhattacharya moved to Calcutta and joined the Jadavpur University as a UGC-nominated retired teacher in the Bengali Department.

Bhattacharya dedicated his life to literary research and amassed a vast collection of rare manuscripts, books and periodicals in Bengali. His collection is now known as the Jatindramohan Collection under the National Education Board of Jadavpur University. The collection has over 10,000 volumes of books, over 1200 journals, letters and documents, and over 8,000 manuscripts in Bengali (including Sylhet Nagri), Assamese, Sanskrit, Hindi, Persian, Arabic and Meitei.

== Awards and works ==
In 1937, he was awarded the Griffith Memorial Prize by the University of Calcutta for his thesis The History of Bengali Lexicon, from 1743 to 1867 A.D. In 1945, he was awarded the Khujista Akhtar Banu Suhrawardy Gold Award for writing ‘Banglar Baishnab Bhabapanna Musalman Kabi’ (Bengal's Vaishnavite Muslim Poets). The University of Calcutta awarded him with the Sarojini Basu Gold Medal in 1980 for his research and contributions to Bengali literature. In 1985, the Rabindra Bharati University awarded him with a Doctor of Letters degree.

Among his 26 published works (written and/or edited) are ‘Srihatter Bhattasangit’ (Bhatta Ballads of Sylhet); ‘Bangla Puthir Talika Samannay’ (Collection of Bengali Puthis), ‘Gopal Thakurer Padabali’ (Gopal Thakur's Poetry), ‘Bangla Abhidhan Granther Parichay’ (Background of Bengali dictionary books) and many more. In 1978, he published Catalogus Catalogrum of Bengali manuscripts, Volume I which is a catalogue of 40,000 Bengali manuscripts, and later did the same for Assamese.

== Death ==
Bhattacharya died in Calcutta, West Bengal in 1990.

== See also ==
- Padmanath Bhattacharya, academic from Sylhet who also researched Bhatta ballads
