= Chhatra Jamiat Bangladesh =

Student organization in Bangladesh

Chhatra Jamiat Bangladesh ছাত্র জমিয়ত বাংলাদেশ
- President: Ridwan Mazhari
- General Secretary: Saad bin Zakir
- Founded: January 24, 1992; 34 years ago
- Headquarters: Purana Paltan, Dhaka
- Ideology: Islamism; Conservatism
- Position: Far-Right
- Colours: Green
- National affiliation: Jamiat Ulema-e-Islam Bangladesh

Flag

Chhatra Jamiat Bangladesh (Bengali: ছাত্র জমিয়ত বাংলাদেশ, lit. 'Student Community Bangladesh') is the student wing of Jamiat Ulema-e-Islam Bangladesh.

The group's strongholds are in Mymensingh and Sylhet.

== History ==
On 12 December 1991, the decision to establish such an organization was finalized in the central Majlish-e-Amela of Jamiat Ulama-e-Islam Bangladesh.

On 24 January 1992, Chhatra Jamiat Bangladesh was established in the name of ''Let's move forward in the struggle for the establishment of individual development, Islamic education, and social order''. Sheikh Mujibur Rahman and Abu Bakr Siddique were appointed as the president and general secretary of Chhatra Jamiat Bangladesh. In January 2021, a new committee and leadership of Chhatra Jamiat was formed.

In January 2024, Chhatra Jamiat launched a rally in Western Sylhet. In December 2024, an 21-member committee of Sunamganj Sadar Upazila unit of Chhatra Jamiat was formed. In December 2024, a new committee of MC College unit of Chhatra Jamiat was formed.
