= Manzurul Islam Effendi =

Bangladeshi Islamic scholar and politician (born 1968)

Shaykh al-Hadith, Maulana Manzurul Islam Effendi
- মঞ্জুরুল ইসলাম আফেন্দী
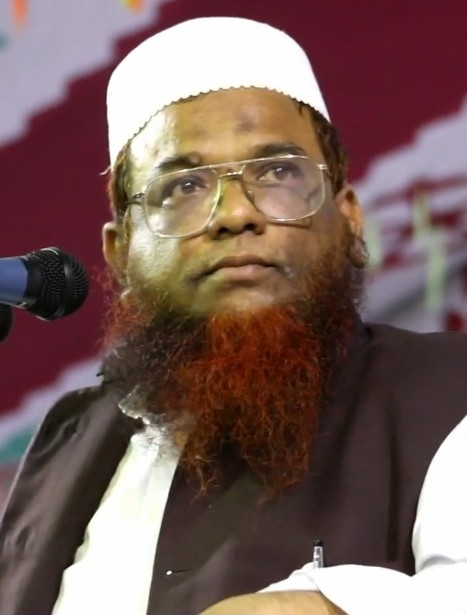
- Effendi in 2019

Secretary General, Jamiat Ulema-e-Islam Bangladesh
- Incumbent
- Assumed office 13 December 2020
- Preceded by: Nur Hossain Kasemi

Assistant Secretary General, Hefazat-e-Islam Bangladesh
- In office 15 November 2020 – 25 April 2021

Director General, Jamia Islamia Islambag
- Incumbent
- Assumed office June 2001
- Preceded by: Imran Mazhari

Personal life
- Born: November 15, 1968 (age 57) Sonaroy, Domar, Nilphamari, East Pakistan
- Era: Modern
- Main interest(s): Hadith, politics
- Education: Darul Uloom Deoband

Religious life
- Religion: Islam
- Denomination: Sunni
- Jurisprudence: Hanafi
- Movement: Deobandi

Manzurul Islam Effendi (born 15 November 1968) is a Bangladeshi Deobandi Islamic scholar, educator, and politician. He is currently serving as the secretary general of the Islamist political party Jamiat Ulema-e-Islam Bangladesh. He previously held the position of assistant secretary general in the Islamic advocacy group Hefazat-e-Islam Bangladesh and served in the same capacity for Qawmi Madrasa Education Board (Befaq).

Beyond politics, Effendi is a prominent academic figure. He serves as the director general and chief hadith lecturer (Shaykh al-Hadith) (Note: Shaykh al-Hadith is an honorary academic title given to the most senior professor of Hadith in an Islamic seminary, who typically teaches the highly revered Sahih al-Bukhari.) of Jamia Islamia Islambag Madrasa, the imam and khatib of Islambag Boro Masjid, the senior vice president of Jatiya Imam Samaj, and the chief patron of Jamia Islamia Riyazia Madrasa.

== Early life and education ==
Effendi was born on 15 November 1968 into a prominent Bengali Muslim family in Dhanipara, located in the Sonaroy Union of Domar Upazila, Nilphamari District. His father, Rashidul Hasan, served as the chairman of the Sonaroy Union Parishad. His grandfather, Ehsanul Haque Effendi, was a prominent scholar and a direct disciple of the eminent Indian Islamic thinker Husain Ahmad Madani. His mother is Shahida Begum.

Effendi began his primary Islamic education at the age of six, learning the Quran under Safiullah, the Imam of his family mosque. By the age of eight, he had successfully memorized the entire Quran (Hifz) (Note: Hifz refers to the complete memorization of the Quran, a highly respected achievement in Islamic tradition. A person who completes this is titled a Hafiz.). In 1980, he enrolled at Darul Uloom Al-Hossainia Olama Bazar Madrasa under the supervision of Abdul Halim, where he studied up to the intermediate level (Kafiya). To pursue higher secondary Islamic studies, he moved to Dhaka in 1988 and enrolled at Jamia Hussainia Islamia Arzabad Madrasa in Mirpur, studying under the guidance of Shamsuddin Kasemi until he completed the Mishkat (graduation) level.

For higher theological studies, Effendi traveled to India in 1993 and gained admission to the prestigious Darul Uloom Deoband. There, he completed his Dawra-e-Hadith (master's in Islamic theology and Hadith studies) (Note: Dawra-e-Hadith is the final, culminating year of study in the traditional Qawmi madrasa curriculum, which is officially recognized by the Government of Bangladesh as equivalent to a Master's degree in Islamic Studies and Arabic.). Spiritually, he pledged allegiance to the former amir of Hefazat-e-Islam, Shah Ahmad Shafi, and eventually received Khilafat (spiritual deputyship) (Note: In the context of Sufism, Khilafat is a formal authorization granted by a spiritual master (Murshid) to an advanced disciple, permitting them to initiate and guide their own disciples.) from him.

== Career ==
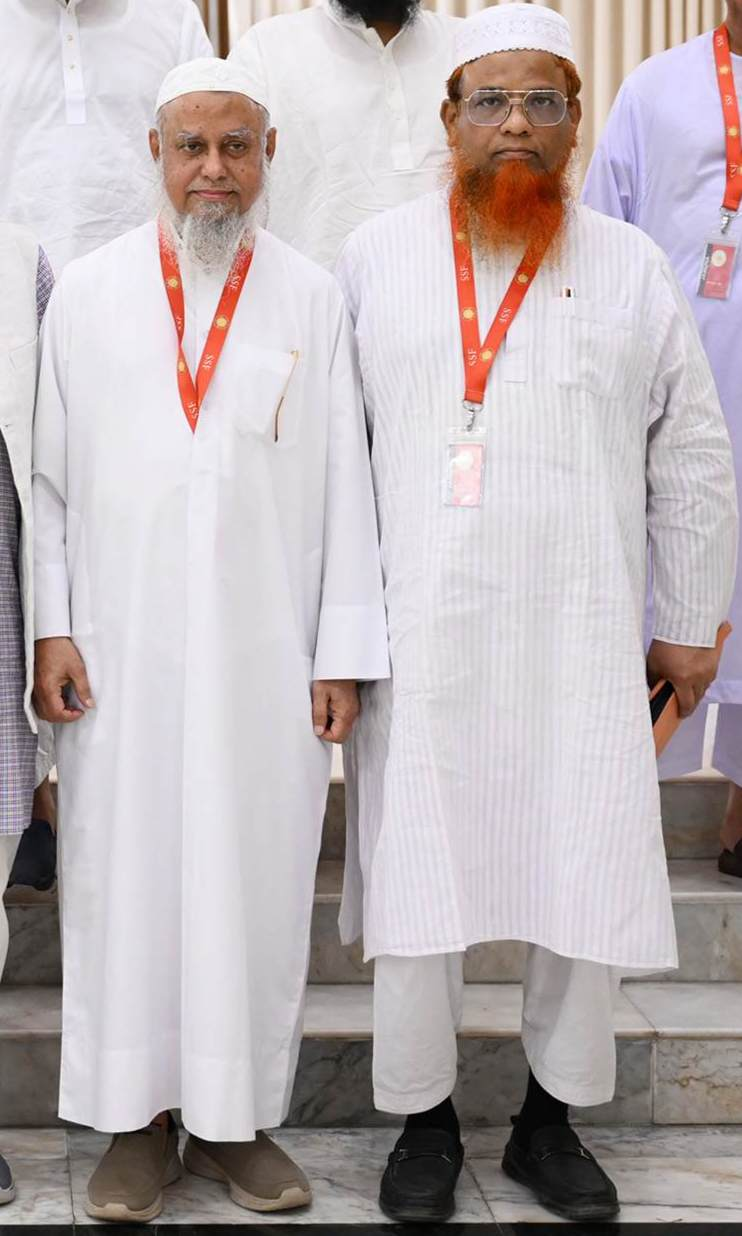
Effendi with Muhammad Sajidur Rahman at the State Guest House Jamuna.

=== Political involvement ===
Effendi has been deeply involved in politics since his student years, initially starting his political journey with Chhatra Jamiat, the student wing of Jamiat Ulema-e-Islam Bangladesh.

Following the death of the party's secretary general, Nur Hossain Kasemi, on 13 December 2020, Effendi was appointed as the acting secretary general. A year later, on 23 December 2021, he was officially elected as the permanent secretary general at the party's national council. In addition to his political roles, he was elected assistant secretary general of Hefazat-e-Islam Bangladesh on 15 November 2020 during the organization's central conference.

On 15 April 2021, Effendi was arrested by law enforcement in connection with multiple cases related to the 2013 Shapla Square protests. Following several months of legal proceedings, he was granted bail and released from prison on 17 August 2021.

Ahead of the 13th National Parliamentary Election, the Bangladesh Nationalist Party (BNP) announced an electoral consensus, allocating four parliamentary seats to Jamiat Ulema-e-Islam Bangladesh. As part of this alliance, Effendi is scheduled to contest the election from the Nilphamari-1 (Domar-Dimla) constituency.

== See also ==
- List of Deobandis
