= Hason Raja (2017 film) =

Bangladeshi film

- Promotional Poster
- Directed by: Ruhul Amin
- Written by: Ruhul Amin
- Screenplay by: Ruhul Amin
- Story by: Selim Al Deen
- Produced by: Shilpankan Films
- Starring: Mithun Chakraborty; Raima Sen
- Cinematography: Shehnad Jalal
- Edited by: Sanjib Datta
- Music by: Bappi Lahiri; Debojyoti Mishra
- Release date: 31 March 2017
- Running time: 165 minutes
- Country: Bangladesh
- Language: Bengali

Hason Raja (হাসন রাজা) is a 2017 Bangladeshi film directed by Ruhul Amin, starring Mithun Chakraborty and Raima Sen.

== Plot ==
The film is about Hason Raja, a flamboyant, ruthless zamindar (aristocrat) from Sylhet, who falls in love with Dilaram, who transforms him. He later becomes a poet, sings songs and travels all over Bangladesh. His songs were influenced by Hinduism, Buddhism and Sufism. He was the inspiration of Nobel laureate Rabindranath Tagore, who mentioned Raja at several conferences around the world, and he remains one of the greatest and most powerful icons of Bengali culture today.

== Cast ==
- Mithun Chakraborty - Hason Raja
- Raima Sen - Dilaram
- Mamunur Rashid
- Runa Kanchan
- Shamima Tushti
- Arman Parvez
- Manosh Bhandapdhya
- Bakar Bokul
- Ayon Choudhury
- Shampa Reza

== Production ==
Fascinated by the legend of Hason Raja, the UK-based director Ruhul Amin wanted to make it as a feature film. With more than 15 documentaries and feature films for the BBC behind him, Ruhul wanted Mithun Chakraborty as Raja and Raima Sen as his muse, Dilaram. Amin met Chakraborty in 2007 and finalized the title role, while Sen agreed to be a part of the film a year later. As Amin could not find a producer for the project in 2003, his friends and the Bangladeshi community based at England funded the film and officially it went to floors on 22 February 2011.

== Soundtrack ==
Hason Raja

Film score by Bappi Lahiri, Debojyoti Mishra
- Genre: Feature film soundtrack, background music

The music was composed by Bappi Lahiri and Debojyoti Mishra. The background music is also by Mishra.

No.	Song	Singers	Lyrics
1	Loke Bole Bole re Ghor Bari Bala nai amar	Kumar Sanu	Hason Raja
2	Matiro Pinjarer Majhe bondhi hoya re	Abhijeet Bhattacharya	Hason Raja
3	Roop Dekhilam Apanar nayane	Shaan	Hason Raja
4	Nesha Lagilo re	Kavita Krishnamurthy	Hason Raja
5	Agun lagaiya dilo koney	Alka Yagnik	Hason Raja
6	Allahar naam loya	Subashis and Shipol	Hason Raja
7	Aila re noya daman ashmanor tera	Shantanu Ghosh, Opi, Onima, Masuka	Hason Raja
8	Charilam Hasoner Nao re	Pantha Kanai	Hason Raja
9	Baula ke banailore	Bappi Lahiri	Hason Raja
10	Guddi Urailo More	Subashis and Nikhita Gandhi	Hason Raja
