= Ruhul Amin (British film director) =

Bangladeshi-born British film director (born 1971)

- রুহুল আমিন
- Born: 1971 (age 54–55); Sylhet District, Bangladesh
- Citizenship: British
- Education: National Film and Television School
- Occupation: Film director
- Years active: 1983–present

Ruhul Amin (Bengali: রুহুল আমিন; born 1971) is a Bangladeshi-born British film director.

== Early life ==
Ruhul Amin was born in Sylhet District, Bangladesh, and came to Britain with his parents in the early 1980s while he was a teenager. While he was at school, he made his first documentary-drama, Prubo London. He attended the National Film and Television School.

== Career ==
In 1986, Ruhul Amin made his first feature film for Channel 4 television entitled A Kind of English.

Ruhul Amin has made 15 films for the BBC and Channel 4. Most of them are documentaries and experimental dramas. He is currently making an epic Bengali feature film Hason Raja based on the based on the life and music of the folk poet, mystic philosopher and songwriter of the same name played by Mithun Chakraborty, produced by Galaxy Films between UK, India and Bangladesh. The film was funded by Ruhul Amin's friends and the Bangladeshi community in England.

Ruhul Amin is known for creating sensitive, understated, poetic films centred on the life of the Bengali community in the East End of London.

== Filmography ==
Year	Title	Notes
1983	Purbo London	
1983	Flame in My Heart	
1986	A Kind of English	TV film
1993	MovieWallah	
1994	Rhythms	
1995	Wicked Tiger	
1996	Violent Earth	
1996	New Eastenders	
1997	Raj Mistri	
1998	Megastars	
2000	We Need You	TV film
2000	Frozen Moments	Short TV film
2014	Scent of Earth	
2018	Hason Raja	
