= Khatme Nabuwat Andolon Bangladesh =

Khatme Nabuwat Andolon Bangladesh (KNAB) Islamic extremist organization that has positioned itself as an Anti-Ahmadiyya group in Bangladesh. They have campaigned for to seize Ahmadiyya mosques and have the Government of Bangladesh declare Ahmadiyya non-Muslims. They have attacked the homes and mosques of the Ahmadiyya community in Bangladesh. The United States Commission on International Religious Freedom described them as "a group of anti-Ahmadi Islamic clerics" International Religious Freedom Report in 2005.

== History ==
Khatme Nabuwat Andolon Bangladesh is a splinter group of the International Khatme Nabuwat Movement, Bangladesh (IKNMB). Hifajate Khatme Nabuwat Andolon (HKNA) is a similar anti-Ahmadiyya group in Bangladesh.

In December 2003, KNAB bought out a procession from the North gate of Baitul Mokarram National Mosque to lay siege to a Ahmadiyya Muslim Community mosque in Bakshibazar, Dhaka.

On 19 March 2004, Khatme Nabuwat Andolon Bangladesh threatened that they will drive out all the Ahmadiyya Muslim Community members living in Barguna District.

On 24 June 2006, Bangladesh Police foiled at attempt by Khatme Nabuwat Andolon Bangladesh to lay siege to an Ahmadiyya Muslim Community mosque in Uttara Thana, Dhaka. They tried to take over the mosque forcefully but were prevent by Rapid Action Battalion.

In June 2007, leaders of Khatme Nabuwat Andolon Bangladesh and the International Khatme Nabuwat Movement, Bangladesh were charged with attacking an Ahmadiyya mosque in Jyotindra Nagar, Satkhira District.

In 2008, Chairman of Khatme Nabuwat Andolon Bangladesh, Mufti Nur Hossain Nurani, Bimanbandar Golchattar Murti Protirodh Committee that forced the Caretaker government to remove a statue of a baul singer in front of Zia International Airport. He also called for the resignation of the Special Advisor to the Chief Advisor of the Caretaker government, Mahbub Jamil.

Muballig (religious preacher) of Rajshahi District of the Ahmadiyya Muslim Community reported that his community members were being harassed by Khatme Nabuwat Andolon Bangladesh, Ahle Hadith Andolon Bangladesh, Bangladesh Jamaat-e-Islami, and Sunni Muslims in December 2015.

On 23 April 2021, Noor Hossain Noorani, President of Khatme Nabuwat Andolon Bangladesh and leader of Hefazat-e-Islam Bangladesh, was arrested over violence in Munshiganj District.
