= Ashraf Ali Bishwanathi =

Bangladeshi Islamic scholar (1928–2005)

Baba-e Jamiat Ashraf Ali Bishwanathi

President, Jamiat Ulema-e-Islam Bangladesh
- In office 12 November 2001 – 20 May 2005
- Preceded by: Abdul Karim
- Succeeded by: Muhiuddin Khan (Acting)

Personal details
- Born: 1928 Bishwanath, Sylhet
- Died: 20 May 2005 (aged 76–77)
- Party: Jamiat Ulema-e-Islam Bangladesh
- Education: Al-Jamiatul Ahlia Darul Ulum Moinul Islam

Personal life
- Parents: Jawad Ullah (father); Habibunnesa alias Jaitun Bibi (mother)
- Main interest: Politics
- Notable work: Monthly Al Farooq

Religious life
- Denomination: Sunni
- Jurisprudence: Hanafi
- Movement: Deobandi

Senior posting
- Disciple of: Abdul Karim

Ashraf Ali Bishwanathi (1928–2005) was a Bangladeshi Deobandi Islamic scholar, educator, politician and religious writer. He was called "Baba-e Jamiat" in order to lay the foundation of Jamiat Ulema-e-Islam Bangladesh in East Pakistan and present day Bangladesh. He was also the president of the party for 2001 to 2005. He was also the founder of Jamia Islamia Darul Uloom Madania Bishwanath, Madania Qawmia Mahila Madrasa and the literary magazine Monthly Al Farooq.

== Biography ==
Ashraf Ali Bishwanathi was born in 1928 in a Muslim family in Ghargaon village under Bishwanath Upazila in Sylhet. His father Jawad Ullah and mother Habibunnesa alias Jaitun Bibi. After studying at Ranaping Arabia Hussainiya Madrasa Dhaka up to Meshkat Jamat, he was admitted in Al-Jamiatul Ahlia Darul Ulum Moinul Islam. In 1949, he completed Dawra-e Hadith (Masters) from there. Among his teachers are Mufti Faizullah, Ahmadul Haq, Shah Abdul Wahhab.

He started his career in 1950 by teaching at Darussalam Galmukapan Madrasa. He taught for 3 years at Jamia Tawakkulia Renga. In 1958, he taught at Parkul Madrasa for one year. In the same year, he reopened Bishwanath M.E. madrasa and was the principal until his death, whose present name is Jamia Islamia Darul Uloom Madania Bishwanath. He established Madania Qawmia Women's Madrasa as the women's branch of the Madania Bishwanath. He became active in politics from his student life. At his invitation, the journey of Jamiat Ulema-e-Islam Sylhet started in the East Pakistan on November 1, 1964, at the Hawapara Mosque. He was its general secretary. In 1975, he was elected its central vice-president. He became the party's executive president in 2000 and acting president in 2001, and permanent president in 2002.

He died on 20 May 2005.

== Literary works ==
He has been involved in writing since his student life. In 1998, he founded the monthly literary magazine Al Farooq. His books include:

- Islam vs Socialism and Democracy
- Text List of Madrasatul Banat (1992)
- A Brief Introduction to Jamiat Ulama Islam (1988)
- First read of Maktab (1983)
- Musafir's Prayers (1996)
- Iraq in the Mirror of Memory (1995)
- A Brief introduction of Edara etc.

== See also ==
- List of Deobandis
