= International Majlis-e Tahaffuz-e-Khatm-e Nobuwat Bangladesh =

Islamist organization in Bangladesh

International Majlis-e Tahaffuz-e-Khatm-e Nobuwat Bangladesh is a right wing Islamist organization in Bangladesh that seeks to ban Ahmadiyya in the country.

== History ==
International Khatme Nabuwat Movement, Bangladesh traces its origin to the Khatm-e-Nabuwwat movement founded in India in the 1860s. It was founded to challenge the beliefs of Ahmadiyya community, a sect of Islam that does believe Muhammad is the last prophet and was founded in India by Mirza Ghulam Ahmad. Khatme Nabuwat means "finality of prophethood" it refers to the Islamic belief that Muhammad is the last messenger of god.

Attacks against the Ahmadiyya community began with during First Khaleda Zia cabinet and continued well into the First Sheikh Hasina Cabinet. They escalated during the third Khaleda Zia cabinet. In 1992 protests were held against Ahmadiyya community and mosques of the community were ransacked in Khulna and Rajshahi. Bangladesh Police blamed the Bangladesh Islami Chhatra Shibir for the attack on Ahmadiyya centre in Dhaka. In 1985 and 1989, religious books of Ahmadiyya were banned.

On 30 March 1993, Bangladesh Khilafat Andolan, Islami Shasantantra Andolen, and Bangladesh Jamaat-e-Islami provided support to Khatme Nabuwat Movement in their movement against the Ahmadiyya community. In 1995, Ali ibn Abdur-Rahman al Hudhaify, head of Prophets mosque in Medina, described Ahmadiyya as "traitors" on a tour in Bangladesh.

Ubaidul Haq, leader of Khatme Nabuwat Movement, held an event in Dhaka on 2 January 2003, which bought speakers from all over the Muslim world, where he called for the Ahmadis to be excommunicated. Delwar Hossain Sayeedi, Member of Parliament, called for them to be declared non-Muslims.

On 16 January 2005, Bangladesh Supreme Court Bar Association called for Khatme Nabuwat Movement to be barred from the Supreme Court premises. They also condemned Khatme Nabuwat Movement for threatening Dr Kamal Hossain, senior lawyer, and Attorney General AF Hassan Ariff over a case on the ban on Ahmadiyya literature. In March 2005, the Rajshahi District unit of Khatme Nabuwat Movement held a rally demanding Ahmadis be declared non-Muslims.

On 23 April 2005, Bangladesh Police as a concession to the protestors of the movement put a sign on the Ahmadiyya mosque in Bogra that read, "The Qadiani upasanalaya (place of worship) in Bogra town: Muslims, do not be fooled into thinking it is a mosque". Ahmadiyya Nayeb National Amir in Bangladesh, Professor Meer Mobashwer Ali, blamed Bangladesh Jamaat-e-Islami for being behind the Khatme Nabuwat Movement on 25 April 2005. He also blamed Inter Service Intelligence. In April 2005, a number of homes of Ahmadiyya community were attacked from a rally of Khatme Nabuwat Movement in Satkhira District. Ahmadiyya community leaders filed cases against Khatme Nabuwat Movement over the attack but no one was detained. Harry K. Thomas Jr, United States Ambassador to Bangladesh, visited the Ahmadiyya mosque in Dhaka and called on the government to protect the community. On 30 April 2005, International Khatme Nabuwat Movement, Bangladesh called the government of Bangladesh to officially declare the Ahmadiyya community as a non-Muslim community. On 29 October 2005, they threaten to overthrow the government if the bill declaring Ahmadiyya community as non-Muslims did not pass the parliament.

On 16 February 2006, Bangladesh law enforcement agencies prevented Khatme Nabuwat Movement from holding a protest in Dhanikhola village in Mymensingh District which contains a small Ahmadiyya community.

On 7 February 2013, the Khatme Nabuwat Movement destroyed the venue of the Ahmadiyya convention in Dhaka.

== See also ==
- Khatme Nabuwat Andolon Bangladesh
