= Society of the Revival of Islamic Heritage =

Islamic organization based in Kuwait

The Society of the Revival of Islamic Heritage (Arabic: ﺟﻤﻌﻴﺔ اﺣﻴﺎء اﻟﺘﺮاث اﻻﺳﻼﻣﻲ) (RIHS) is a Kuwait-based NGO with branches in a number of countries.

== Spain ==
According to the Spanish intelligence agency CNI, Kuwait provided funding and aid to Islamic associations and congregations in Spain through its subsidiary branch of RIHS. Kuwait this way funded mosques in Reus and Torredembarra who spread an ideology contrary to the integration of Muslims into Spanish society and fostering hatred of non-Muslims.

== Pakistan and Afghanistan branches ==
=== Corruption and terrorism ===
The branches in Pakistan and Afghanistan allegedly became corrupted by members of al-Qaeda; those two branches were embargoed on 9 January 2002 by the United States. The government of Russia has banned RIHS from operating anywhere in Russia and has deemed the society to be a terrorist organisation.

A release from the Treasury's Press Office alleged that the Pakistan office, under the direction of Abd al-Muhsin al-Libi, had inflated the number of orphans under its care.

The United States has the organization listed on the OFAC SDN list (as Administration of the Revival of Islamic Heritage Society Committee), thus prohibiting U.S. citizens and permanent residents from doing business with the organization.

=== Guantanamo captives whose continued detention was justified through connection to RIHS ===
The continued detention of several Guantanamo captives has been justified, in part, through their association with the Revival of Islamic Heritage Society.

Salim Mahmoud Adem Mohammed Bani Amir	Two of the allegations against Amir were: "Detainee was employed with the Revival of Islamic Heritage Society (RIHS) since 1994."; "RIHS is suspected of supporting extremist activity, and some employees are suspected of financing terrorism."
Sami Mohy El Din Muhammed Al Hajj	Three of the factors used to justify Al Hajj's continued detention were: "While in Azerbaijan, the detainee came into contact with Ashraf, who ran the juice distribution business for the Union Beverage Company in Azerbaijan."; "Between 1994-1998, Ashraf Abdulrahim Ayub worked for the Revival of Islamic Heritage Society (RIHS), a non-governmental organization."; "The Revival of Islamic Heritage Society has been identified under Executive Order 13224 as a terrorist affiliated organization.
Hammad Ali Amno Gadallah	Four of the five allegations against Gadallah were: "The detainee stated that he worked as an accountant for the Society for the Revival of Islamic Heritage (RIHS)."; "The RIHS is listed in the United States Department of Homeland Security - Terrorist Organization Reference Guide."; "Before being named The Society for the Revival of Islamic Heritage, the office in Peshawar, Pakistan, was called the Afghanistan Support Committee (ASC)."; "The ASC was designated on the United States Executive Order Asset Freeze List for suspected support of terrorism financing in late 2001."; Gadallah was one of the few Guantanamo captives whose Combatant Status Review Tribunal determined should never have been classified as an "enemy combatant".
Mohammed Fenaitel Mohamed Al Daihani	Two of the allegations against Al Daihani were: "The detainee worked for the Revival of Islamic Heritage Society."; "The Revival of Islamic Heritage Society appears on the Terrorist Exclusion List of the U.S. Dept. of Homeland Security Terrorist Organization Reference Guide."; Al Daihani, an accountant at Kuwait's State Audit Bureau, pointed out that the charity was “an official society from the Kuwaiti government”, and that some Kuwaitis donated to it.
