= Nurul Islam Khan =

Bangladeshi politician (died 2023)

Md Nurul Islam Khan

Member of Bangladesh Parliament
- In office 1973–1975

Personal details
- Born: 16 January 1946 Sreedharpur, Bishwanath, Sylhet
- Died: 21 February 2023 (aged 77) Sylhet
- Party: Awami League
- Other political affiliations: Jatiya Janata Party

Nurul Islam Khan (Bengali: নুরুল ইসলাম খান; died 21 February 2023) was a Bangladeshi politician and a member of parliament for Sylhet-7.

== Career ==
Khan was elected to parliament from Sylhet-7 as an Awami League candidate in 1973. Later he contested as a Jatiyo Janata Party candidate from Sylhet-2.

== Death ==
He died at private hospital in Sylhet on 21 February 2023.
