= Bishwanath Upazila =

Bishwanath বিশ্বনাথ
- Upazila
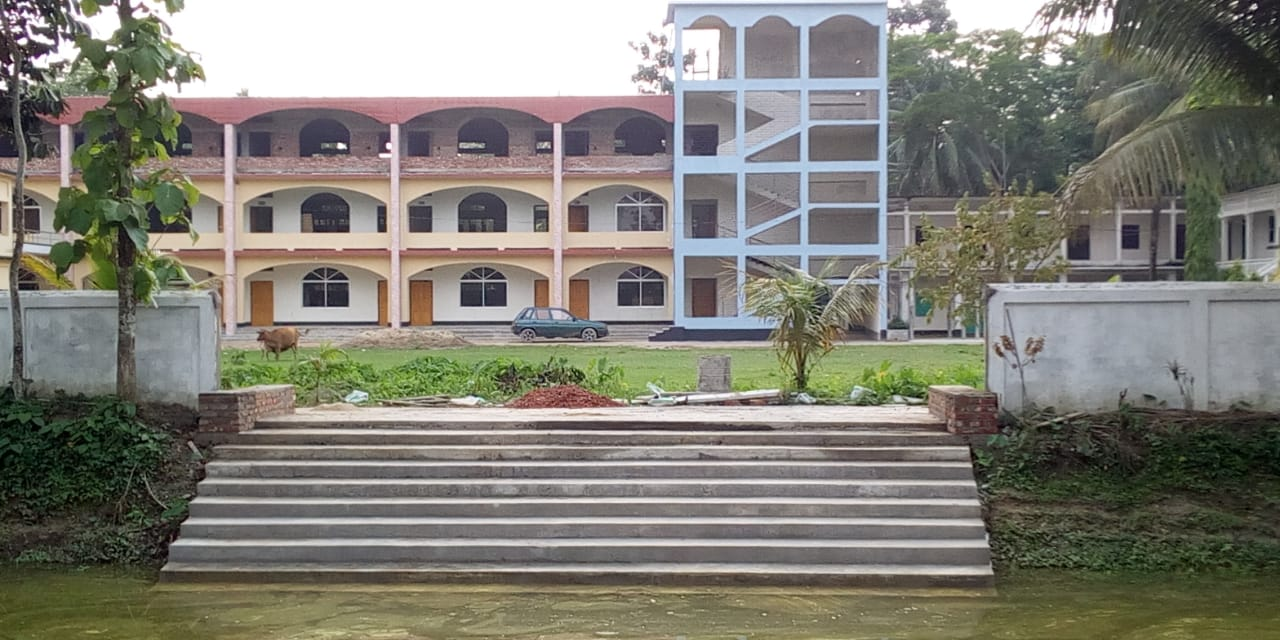
- Satpur Madrasa, Bishwanath Upazila

- Country: Bangladesh
- Division: Sylhet
- District: Sylhet

Area
  - Total: 213.16 km^{2} (82.30 sq mi)

Population (2022)
  - Total: 237,213
  - Density: 1,112.8/km^{2} (2,882.2/sq mi)
- Demonym(s): Bishwanathi, Bishnathi
- Time zone: UTC+6 (BST)
- Postal code: 3130
- Area code: 08224
- Website: bishwanath.sylhet.gov.bd

Bishwanath (Bengali: বিশ্বনাথ) is an upazila of Sylhet District in Sylhet Division, Bangladesh.

Bishwanath Upazila mauza geocode map

== History ==
One of the palaces of Gour Govinda, the last Hindu ruler of Sylhet, was situated in present-day Bishwanath. Its ruins are still intact and is locally referred to as 'Jahazer Manzil' and next to Govinda's personal pond, the 'Satpari Dighi'. During the Muslim conquest of Sylhet in 1303, Govinda abandoned Sylhet and fled to the Kamrup region. Shah Jalal, a leader of the conquest, was known to have dispatched his disciples across the region to propagate Islamic teachings. Among the disciples that arrived in present-day Bishwanath is Syed Batauk, the ancestor of Abdul Karim Kauria. Shah Chand was the son of Shaykh Kalu, another of Shah Jalal's disciples, and the village of Chandbharang was named after him. Shah Chand is the forefather of the Chowdhuries of Chandbharang, including Suheluddin Chowdhury and Shafiqur Rahman Chowdhury.

After the defeat of Raja Subid Narayan of Ita by Khwaja Usman in the early 17th century, many Hindus migrated elsewhere including the area now comprising Bishwanath. Vijayaram Upadhayaya and his Kayastha student Bidhar Khan sailed with their family and friends through the Kapna river to this area (then a forest) for safety. The area was then home to a group of bandits led by Jula, but they were defeated by Bidhar Khan and his associates. The new settlers named the area 'Banabhag' (forest area), the area which he docked his boat came to be known as 'Bidhar Ghat' and the neighbourhood of the bandits came to be known as 'Jular Chiri'. When the Mughals came into power, they divided Banabhag into three parganas: Khalisa-Banabhag, Bazu-Banabhag and Kazakhabad. Bidhar Khan became the Zamindar of Bazu-Banabhag. His descendant, Ramnath Dhar, was a contemporary of Gopinath Bachaspati. Dhar's son, Babu Ramjivan Rai, was given the title of Chowdhury and granted land in Baurbhag by Inayetullah Khan, the Mughal administrator of Sylhet, in 1692. He was known to have been devoted to idol worship. His son, Bhavani Shankar, was the father of Zamindar Ram Shankar Chowdhury. Ram Shankar's son, Bishwanath Rai Chaudhury, established the 'Bishwanath Bazaar' which gradually expanded. His son, Brajanath Chaudhury, established an akhara for Chaitanya Mahaprabhu and was succeeded by Baikuntha Nath Chaudhury. Baikuntha Nath's son, Varada Nath Chaudhury, was a distinguished poet of Bishwanath.

Bishwanath was established as a thana in 1922. During the Bangladesh War of 1971, many Hindus were killed in Bishwanath including Jitendra Das, Dhirendra Kumar Das, Byomkesh Chaudhury, Narayan Sen and Basanta Kumar Das. Bishwanath Thana was upgraded to upazila (sub-district) in 1983 as part of President of Bangladesh, Hussain Muhammad Ershad's decentralisation programme.

== Demographics ==
Religions in Bishwanath Upazila (2022)
Religion	Percent
Islam	95.42%
Hinduism	4.57%
Other or not stated	0.01%

According to the 2022 Bangladeshi census, Bishwanath Upazila had 44,537 households and a population of 237,213. 8.64% of the population were under 5 years of age. Bishwanath had a literacy rate (age 7 and over) of 74.19%: 76.39% for males and 72.13% for females, and a sex ratio of 94.17 males for every 100 females. 61,831 (26.07%) lived in urban areas.

According to the 2011 Census of Bangladesh, Bishwanath Upazila had 37,993 households and a population of 232,573. 59,991 (25.79%) were under 10 years of age. Bishwanath had a literacy rate (age 7 and over) of 46.87%, compared to the national average of 51.8%, and a sex ratio of 1009 females per 1000 males. 21,059 (9.05%) lived in urban areas.

At the 1991 Bangladesh census, Bishwanath had a population of 169,730, of whom 83,794 were aged 18 or older. Males constituted 50.99% of the population, and females 49.01%. Bishwanath had an average literacy rate of 30.6% (7+ years), against the national average of 32.4%.

=== Education ===
The first alia madrasa of Bishwanath, Satpur Alia Madrasa in Lamakazi Union, was founded in 1948 by Ghulam Hussain, a native wali of Satpur and murid of Pir Hamidullah Qaimganji and Abdul Latif Chowdhury Fultali. In 1960, the Bishwanath Alia Madrasa was established. The largest Qawmi madrasa of Bishwanath, Jamia Islamia Abbasia, was opened by Abdul Karim Shaykh-e-Kauria in 1955. There are 28 other madrasas in Bishwanath. They are: Jamia Islamia Darul Uloom Madania (founder, Ashraf Ali Bishwanathi), Jamia Islamia Miftahul Uloom (Maulana Ibrahim Ali, 1963), Munawwarul Uloom Islamia Madrasa (1992), Jamia Islamia Darul Uloom Lamakazi, Darul Quran Faiz-e-Aam Mirerchak, Jamia Islamia Darus Sunnah Amtail, Darul Uloom Chandbharang, Jamia Islamia Lutfabad-Patakain, Jamia Islam Darul Uloom Baruni, Madrasa-e-Tawakkulia Hafizia Sham-e-Mardan, Sheikhergaon Ibn Abbas Ibtidayi Madrasa, Haji Md Mafiz Ali Tahfizul Quran and Ibtidayi Madrasa, Darul Hikmah Islamic Academy, Jamia Madinatul Uloom Shimultala, Muqaddasia Islamia Hafizia Madrasa, Madinatul Uloom Sriramsri, Ariful Quran Hafizia Madrasa, Great Khurma Islamic Academy, Jamia Muhammadia Arabia, Jamia Tawakkulia Chowk Qasimpur, Jamia Islamia Hafizia Rampasha, Jamia Islamia Noagaon, Madinatul Uloom Nurani Hafizia Madrasa, Jamia Islamia Markazul Uloom Qadipur (Haji Shafiq Ali, 2016). Bishwanath also has three women's madrasas: Jamia Madania Qawmia Women's Madrasa, Jamia Tayyibah Qawmi Women's Madrasa (Anhar bin Saeed, 2018), Dhu al-Nuraryn Islamia Women's Madrasa (Amirul Islam, 2008).

== Administration ==
Bishwanath Upazila is divided into eight union parishads: Alankari, Bishwanath, Doshghar, Daulatpur, Deokalas, Khajanchi, Lamakazi, and Rampasha. The union parishads are subdivided into 123 mauzas and 444 villages.

== Notable people ==
- Jatindramohan Bhattacharya, academic and literary researcher
- Ashraf Ali Bishwanathi, Islamic scholar
- Nurul Islam Khan, Advocate and former MP for Sylhet-7
- Ilias Ali, former MP for Sylhet-2
- Mokabbir Khan, former MP for Sylhet-2
- Muhammad Nurul Haque, cultural activist, social worker and writer
- Ragib Ali, industrialist, tea-planter, educationalist
- Rubel Ahmed, died in Morton Hall Immigration Removal Centre under controversial circumstances
- Rushanara Ali, British politician
- Shafiqur Rahaman Chowdhury, Awami League politician
- Hason Raja, mystic poet, musician, philosopher

== See also ==
- Upazilas of Bangladesh
- Districts of Bangladesh
- Divisions of Bangladesh
