= Jamiat Ulema-e-Islam Bangladesh =

Bangladeshi political party

Jamiat Ulema-e-Islam Bangladesh জমিয়তে উলামায়ে ইসলাম বাংলাদেশ Party of Islamic Scholars Bangladesh
- Abbreviation: JUI
- President: Ubaydullah Faruk
- Secretary-General: Monjurul Islam Afendi
- Founder: Shabbir Ahmad Usmani (founder of JUI)
- Founded: 1945 (original); 1972 (current)
- Preceded by: Jamiat Ulema-e-Islam
- Headquarters: Dhaka, Bangladesh
- Student wing: Chhatra Jamiat Bangladesh
- Youth wing: Jubo Jamiat Bangladesh
- Ideology: Islamism; Islamic fundamentalism; Religious nationalism
- Political position: Far-right
- Religion: Islam
- Colors: Green
- Bangladesh Parliament: 0 / 350

Election symbol
- Palm Tree

Party flag

Jamiat Ulema-e-Islam Bangladesh (Bengali: জমিয়তে উলামায়ে ইসলাম বাংলাদেশ) is a Bangladeshi Islamic Party registered with Bangladesh Election Commission. It is the successor to the Jamiat Ulema-e-Islam. Jamiat Ulema-e-Islam Bangladesh was a member of the 20-Party alliance. It was a member of Islami Oikya Jote and which it left in 2008.

== History ==
Muhammad Wakkas, secretary general of Jamiat Ulema-e-Islam Bangladesh, was elected to parliament in 1986 and 1988 from Jessore-5 as a candidate of Jatiya Party. He served as the minister of religious affairs in the cabinet of President Hussain Muhammad Ershad.

In 2016, the Jamiat Ulema-e-Islam Bangladesh organized a protest against Islamic militancy in Dhaka.

In 2017, Hefazat-e-Islam Bangladesh sought nominations from Jamiat Ulema-e-Islam Bangladesh, and other Islamist parities, to contest the upcoming general election in 2018.

Nur Hossain Kasemi, secretary general of Jamiat Ulema-e-Islam Bangladesh criticised the government of India for seeking Bangladeshi land to build an airport in Agartala, Tripura in August 2019.

In 2020, the Jamiat Ulema-e-Islam Bangladesh campaigned to cancel the invitation to Prime Minister Narendra Modi to visit Bangladesh by the government of Bangladesh.

== Associate organisations ==
- Chhatra Jamiat Bangladesh
- Jubo Jamiat Bangladesh

== Leaders ==
- Deen Muhammad Khan
- Ashraf Ali Bishwanathi
- Muhiuddin Khan
- Abdul Momin Imambari
- Zia Uddin

== See also ==
- List of Deobandi organisations
