= Hason Raja =

Bengali mystic poet (1854–1922)

- হাছন রাজা
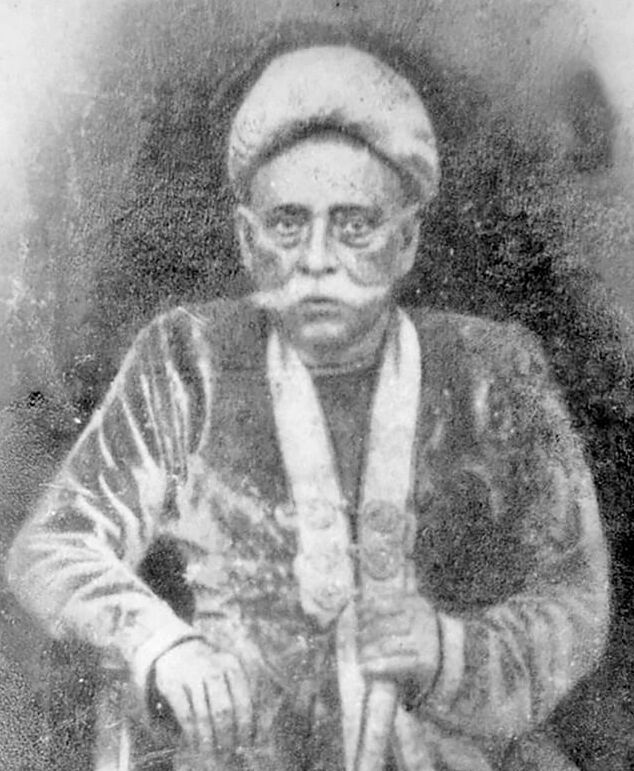
- Born: Dewan Hason Raja Choudhury; 21 December 1854; Sunamganj, Bengal, British India
- Died: 6 December 1922 (aged 67); Sylhet, East Bengal and Assam, British India
- Occupations: Raja, Landlord, Musician, Songwriter, Mystic Poet
- Children: 4
- Relatives: D. M. H Obaidur Raza Chowdhury (grandson): Dewan Taimur Raja Chowdhury (grandson); Dewan Mohammad Azraf (grandson); Dewan Shamsul Abedin (great-grandson)

Dewan Hason Raja Choudhury, or simply known as Hason Raja (Bengali: হাছন রাজা; 21 December 1854 – 6 December 1922), was a Bengali mystic poet and songwriter from Sylhet, Bengal Presidency (now Bangladesh). His unique style of music made him one of the most prominent figures in Bengali folk culture.

== Biography ==
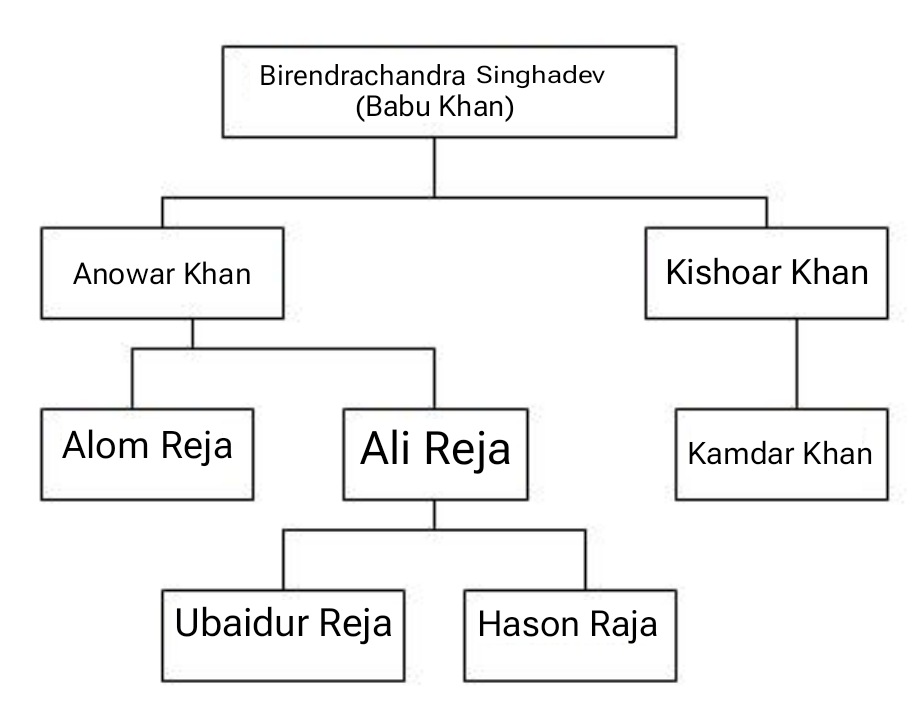
Family Tree of Hason Raja

=== Early life ===
Raja was born on 21 December 1854 in Teghoriya village of Lakshmansree parghana, now Sunamganj to a Bengali Muslim zamindar family. His father was Dewan Ali Raja, the grandson of Birendraram Singhadev. His great-grandfather later converted from Hinduism to Islam and changed his name to Dewan Raja Babu Khan. Hason Raja's mother was Hurmat Jahan Bibi, the last and fifth wife of Dewan Ali Raja Chowdhury of Kauriya. Hurmat was previously a widow after the death of her former husband, Muhammad Asim Chowdhury. Hason Raja spent most of his childhood in Lakshmansree with his mother as his father married the widow of his first cousin late Amir Baksh Chowdhury who was living at Lahshmansree (Sunamganj) the most north-eastern part of now Bangladesh. His father started on and off living in Lakshmanshree of Sunamganj, 33 miles away from Rampasha, for at least three or four months of the year. Ali supervised and managed his wife's properties at Lakshmansree. That is why Lakshmansree was the birthplace of the poet.

The death of Raja's elder half-brother, Ubaidur Raja, followed by the death of his father approximately 40 days later, made Hason the primary caretaker of his family from a relatively young age. His sister Sahifa Bano would also become a poet, the first female poet from Sylhet; she wrote in the Urdu language.

=== Later life ===
Raja practiced Sufism. Raja established schools and religious centres like mosques and he is said to have been widely engaged in charities within his immediate communities. He donated vast land properties for the well-being of the people. He was interested in the well-being and protection of birds and animal life. He spent a large quantity of his money on those lives. The 12 June 1897 Assam earthquake was one of the biggest earthquakes that occurred in the Assam and Sylhet area. The largest known Indian interpolate earthquake (at 8.0 on the moment magnitude scale) resulted in the destruction of structures over much of the Plateau and surrounding areas, and caused widespread liquefaction and flooding in the Brahmaputra and Sylhet floodplains. He found out many of his kin and relatives as well as his people wounded and killed. His thatched house was fully damaged. He lost many of his tamed birds and animals.

=== Death ===
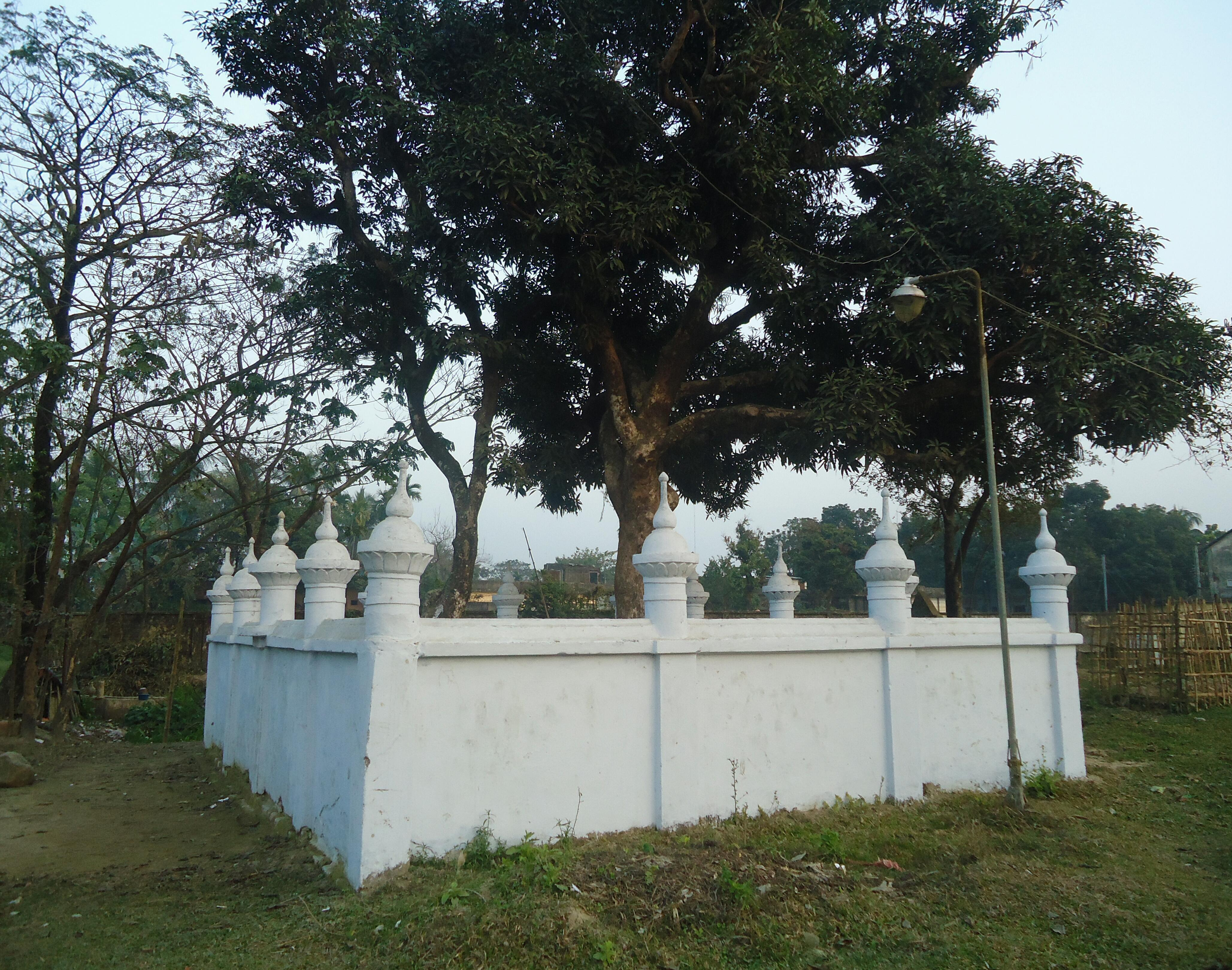
Grave of Raja

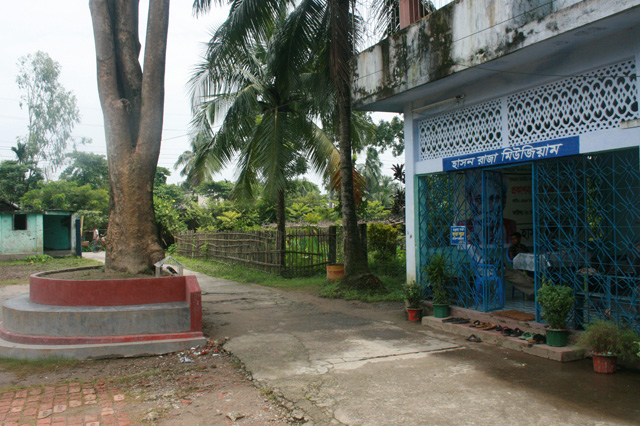
Hason Raja Museum, Sylhet, Bangladesh

Raja died on 6 December 1922. (Note: Sources vary regarding the month and day of his death. Banglapedia (Second edition) says he died in November. The Hason Raja Museum Trust, Dewan Muhammed Azrof and Dhaka Tribune say he died on 6 December. Banglapedia (First edition) says he died on 7 December. The Daily Star says he died on 8 December.) Two museums were established in his name in two places. One, Hason Raja Museum sponsored by "Hason Raja Museum Trust" at Sunamganj at his birthplace, Lokkonshri, Sunamganj, and another, Museum of Rajas' at RajaKunjo, Sylhet, sponsored by "Educationist Dewan Talibur Raja Trust".

== In popular culture ==
In 2002, the film Hason Raja was released, detailing his life and times, where Raja was played by Helal Khan. It was reported by Washington Bangla Radio in May 2013, that an epic Bengali feature film Hason Raja is under production, based on the life and music of Raja played by Mithun Chakraborty, directed by Ruhul Amin, and produced by Galaxy Films between UK, India and Bangladesh. In 2017, the film was released.

Raja's songs are collected in books Hason Udas and Shaukhin Bahar A volume called Hason Raja Samagra was also published. It contained 500 poems and songs.

== Critical response ==
Author Humayun Ahmed brought Hason Raja's work in limelight again in modern days after using Raja's various popular folk songs in his movies and television dramas. Author Rabindranath Tagore quoted on Hason Raja, 'We realise it through admiration and love, through hope that soars beyond the actual, beyond our own span of life into an endless time wherein we live of all men.' and 'It is a village poet of East Bengal who preaches in a song the philosophical doctrine that the universe has its reality in its relation to the Person.'
