= History of Bangladeshis in the United Kingdom =

Bangladeshis are one of the largest immigrant communities in the United Kingdom. Ethnic Bengali peoples, particularly from Sylhet, arrived as early as the seventeenth century, mostly as lascar seamen working on ships. Following the founding of Bangladesh in 1971, a large immigration to Britain took place during the 1970s, leading to the establishment of a British Bangladeshi community. Bangladeshis were encouraged to move to Britain during that decade because of changes in immigration laws, natural disasters such as the Bhola cyclone, the Bangladesh Liberation War against Pakistan, and the desire to escape poverty, and the perception of a better living led Sylheti men bringing their families. During the 1970s and 1980s, they experienced institutionalised racism and racial attacks by organised far-right groups such as the National Front and the British National Party.

== Early history of Bangladeshis in Britain ==
Throughout the 17th to early 20th centuries, the British East India Company employed thousands of lascars and workers from British India, who were mostly Bengali Muslim and Punjabi Sikh, to work on British ships. The first educated to travel from colonial India to Europe and live in Britain was I'tisam-ud-Din, a Bengali Muslim cleric, munshi and diplomat to the Mughal Empire who arrived in 1765 with his servant Muhammad Muqim during the reign of King George III. He wrote of his experiences and travels in his Persian book, Shigurf-nama-i-Wilayat (or 'Wonder Book of Europe'). This is also the earliest record of literature by a British Asian. Also during the reign of George III, the hookah-bardar (hookah servant/preparer) of James Achilles Kirkpatrick was said to have robbed and cheated Kirkpatrick, making his way to England and stylising himself as the Prince of Sylhet. The man was waited upon by the prime minister of Great Britain William Pitt the Younger, and then dined with the Duke of York before presenting himself in front of the King.

Another early record of a migrant from Sylhet by the name of Saeed Ullah can be found in Robert Lindsay's autobiography. Saeed Ullah was said to have migrated not only for work but also to attack Lindsay and avenge his elders for the Muharram Rebellion of 1782. Due to the majority of early Sylheti settlers being lascar seamen, the earliest Muslim communities were found in port towns. Naval cooks and waiters also came. There are other records of Sylheti-Bengalis working in London restaurants from at least 1873. At the beginning of World War I, there were 51,616 lascars from the subcontinent working on British ships, the majority of whom were of Bengali descent.

Many middle-class Sylhetis believed that seafaring was a historical and cultural inheritance due to a proportion of their community being descended from foreign traders, lascars and businessman from the Middle East and Central Asia who migrated before and after the Muslim conquest of Sylhet in 1303. Khala Miah claimed this was a very encouraging factor for Sylhetis to travel to Calcutta aiming to eventually reach the United States and United Kingdom. A crew of lascars would be led by a Serang. Serangs were ordered to recruit crew members themselves by the British and so they would go into their own villages and areas in the Sylhet region often recruiting their family and neighbours. The British had no problem with this as it guaranteed the group of lascars would be in harmony. According to lascars Moklis Miah and Mothosir Ali, up to forty lascars from the same village would be in the same ship.

Shah Abdul Majid Qureshi claimed to be the first Sylheti to open a restaurant in the country. It was called Dilkush and was located in Soho. Another one of his restaurants, known as India Centre, alongside early Sylheti migrant Ayub Ali Master's Shah Jolal cafe, became hub for the British Asian community and was sites where the India League would hold meetings attracting influential figures such as Subhas Chandra Bose, Krishna Menon and Mulk Raj Anand. Ali was an influential figure who supported working-class lascars, providing them food and shelter. In 1943, Qureshi and Ali founded the Indian Seamen's Welfare League which ensured social welfare for British Asians. Ayub Ali was also the president of the United Kingdom Muslim League having links with Liaquat Ali Khan and Mohammad Ali Jinnah.

Due to the lack of Sylheti women in Britain at the time, partially due to restrictions on Indian sailors on British ships, some early Bengali sailors settled down and took local white British wives. As a result, most early British-born Bengalis were usually 'mixed-race' ('Anglo-Indian' or 'Eurasian'), with notable examples including Albert Mahomet and Frederick Akbar Mahomed. Most of these mixed-race individuals assimilated into British society through marriage with the local white population, and this assimilated population did not form a distinct, self-identifying British Bengali community until Bangladeshi women began arriving in large numbers in the 1970s (after the independence of Bangladesh). From the 1970s onward, a majority of Bangladeshis chose to marry among one another. From the 1970s onward, a majority of Bangladeshis chose to marry among one another, leading to the establishment of a permanent British Bangladeshi community.

== Causes of immigration ==
A large number of Bangladeshi men emigrated to the UK for employment during the 1950s and the 1960s, and they are regarded as the first generation Bangladeshi settlers. They settled in industrial cities and towns such as Birmingham, Luton, Bedford, Oldham, Haslingden, Rochdale, Manchester, Leeds, Bradford, Liverpool, Scunthorpe, Kidderminster, Sunderland and the London boroughs of Camden, Westminster, Hackney, Newham, Redbridge and Tower Hamlets, particularly around Spitalfields and Whitechapel for security of employment and better pay. A majority of Bangladeshi people in the UK immigrated from the Surma and Barak Valleys of the Sylhet region, which is located in the north-east of Bangladesh.

The Immigration Act of 1971 came to force in 1972 and imposed myriad restrictions on the flow of immigration from Bangladesh to the UK; it allowed only wives and children under sixteen years of age to join their husbands and fathers, who were already settled in the UK. As a result, most new arrivals following the act's implementation were family members of men who already lived in the United Kingdom. In the mid-1970s, economic decline in the UK discouraged men from bringing their families to join them. In the last part of the 1970s, the privatization and collapse of companies in the heavy industries led to mass-scale redundancy in the British Sylheti community. This led the Sylheti people opening their own restaurants and takeaways throughout the country. This trend was followed by the Pakistani and Indian communities in the UK. From this point onwards, curry houses known as Indian restaurants spread to every corner of the country, and several Sylheti chefs and restaurant owners have since gained fame and wealth. Brick Lane and the surrounding areas in Tower Hamlets became famous for curry houses.

== Bangladesh Liberation War ==
During 1971, East Pakistan (known today as Bangladesh) went to war against West Pakistan (Pakistan) for independence, in what was known as the Bangladesh Liberation War. The Pakistani infantry occupied the Sylhet region, which led some people to join the Mukti Bahini to defend themselves against the Pakistanis. Large numbers of Sylhetis also fled the fighting, arriving in the UK during the 1970s.

Bengalis in Britain also took part in the War of Independence. In August 1969, Bangladeshi settlers in Birmingham formed the East Pakistan Liberation Front. It was led by Abdus Sabur Choudhury and Azizul Hoque Bhuia. The group published a fortnightly called Bidrohi Bangla that reported on the war's developments. Getting the news of Pakistani military action on 25 March 1971, there was a movement in Birmingham Smallheath Park. Over 10,000 Bengalis were present there. In that gathering, the East Pakistan Liberation Front was renamed the Bangladesh Action Committee. Actions and Movements: - 5 March 1971 - Demonstration in front Pakistan High Commission in London. Flag burning and memorandum handover to high commissioner for liberation - 7 March 1971 all Party Gathering in Smallheath Park Birmingham renounce of deceleration of Independence, - 28 March uplifting Bangladesh Flag in Smallheath Park Birmingham. - 3 May 1971 300 MP of British Parliament agreed to support Bangladesh movement - 21 June 1971 120 Bengali went to Paris to demonstrate against Pakistan Aid Consortium of 12 developed countries. Pakistan did not get any Aid. - 30 June 1971 Pakistani ship Padma full of arms and ammunitions was in the jetty of Montreal sea port Canada. Bangladesh Action Committee demonstrated in front of Canadian High Commission and finally Canadian government ceased it.

Bengalis in Britain played a significant role in the independence of Bangladesh by bringing visibility to the country and its struggles in the Western media.

== First Bangladeshi settlers ==
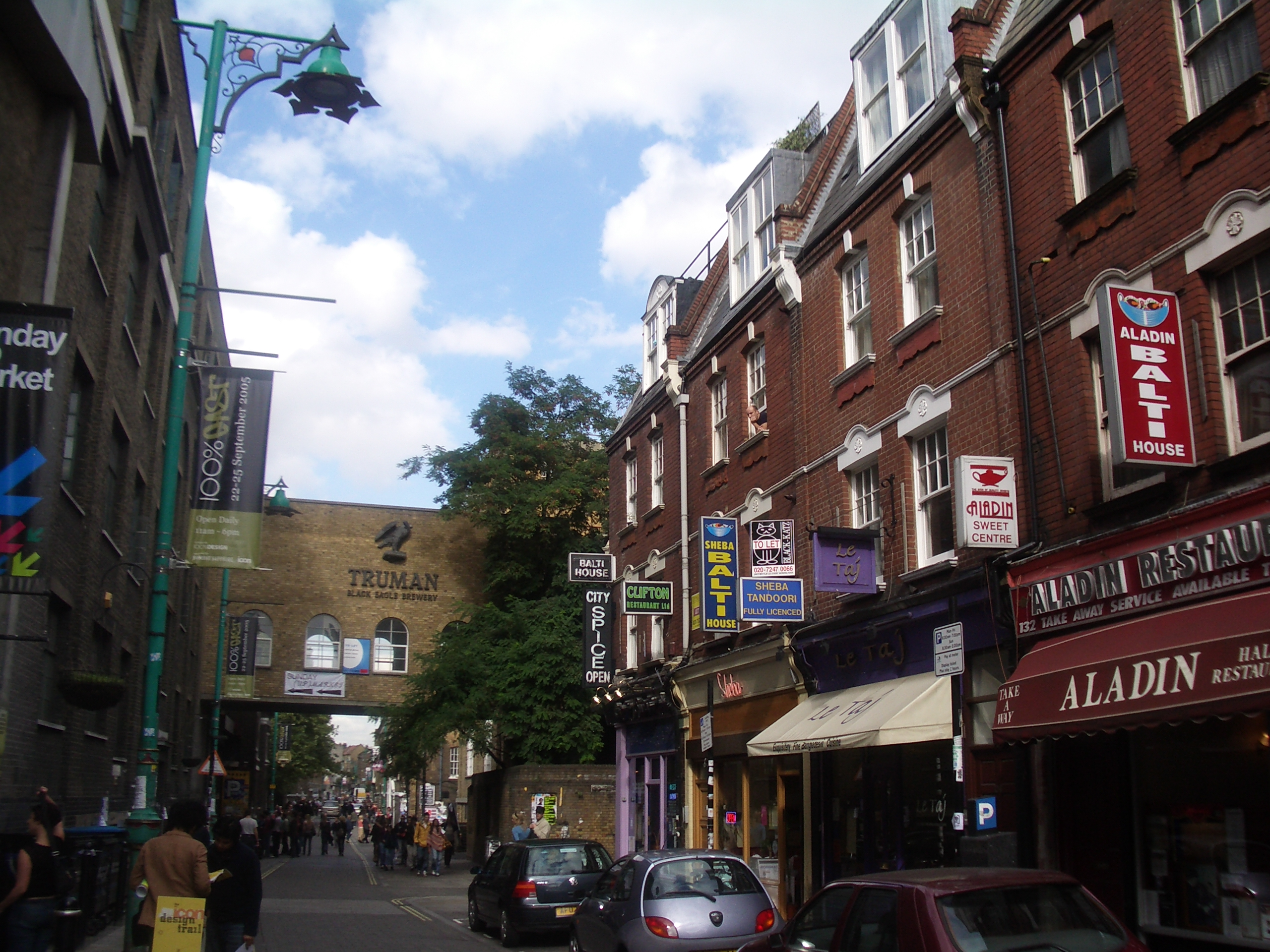
First-generation Bangladeshis arrived and settled mainly on Brick Lane, Spitalfields

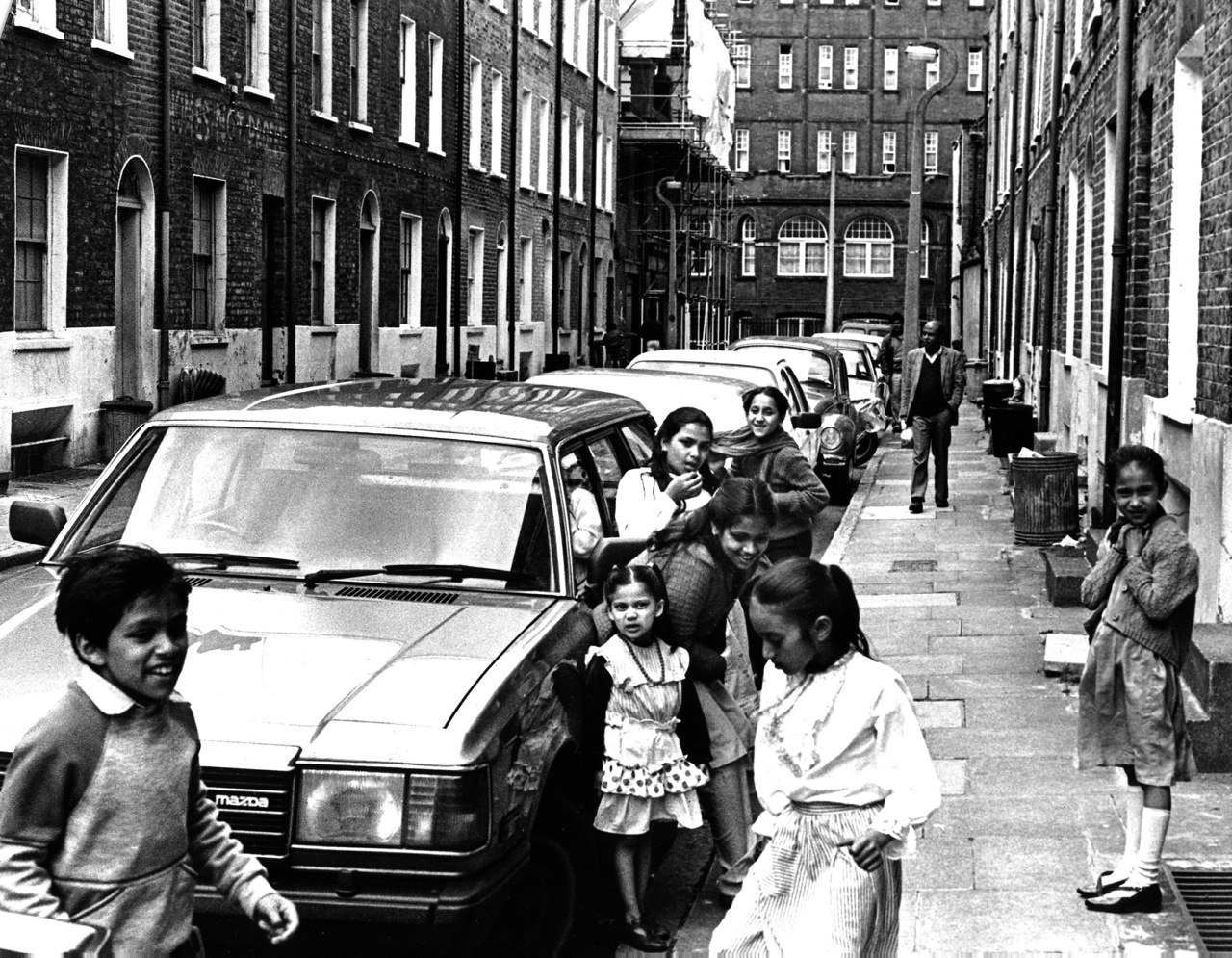
Early second generation Bangladeshis in Whitechapel, 1986

Bangladeshis first started arriving in the UK in large numbers in the 1970s and mostly settled in and around the Brick Lane in the East London. However, some Bengalis had been present in the country as early as the 1920s, although minuscule. Author Caroline Adams records one instance in 1925 when a lost Bengali searching for other Bengali settlers in London was told by a policeman: 'you better go on until you smell curry'. At this time, there were many more Jewish people in London than there were Bengalis. Some of these were Sylhetis who came to Britain by sea after working as lascars on ships.

Bangladeshis who came to the UK anticipated they would find great opportunities there. However, many experienced various problems. They lived and worked in cramped basements and attics in Tower Hamlets. Centuries earlier, these same properties had housed Huguenot immigrants who weaved silk and worked for very long hours in badly heated and poorly lit workshops. The Bengalis found they could not interact with the English-speaking population, and therefore could not enter higher education. There has been a decline in business throughout East London, which has led to unemployment among Bangladeshi workers. The garment manufacturing industry was part of this decline. The Bangladeshis instead became cooks, waiters and mechanics, but their progress up the social and economic ladder was a slow one. The men were often illiterate, poorly educated, and spoke little English. They became easy targets for some of their ruthless compatriots who seized control of their housing in Whitechapel in the 1970s and sold the properties onto other Sylhetis, many of who had no legal claim to the buildings.

By 1970, Brick Lane, and many nearby streets, had become predominantly Bengali. The Jewish bakeries were turned into curry houses, the jewellery shops were turned into sari stores, and the synagogues into dress factories. In 1976, the synagogue at the corner of Fournier Street and Brick Lane became the Jamme Masjid (community mosque). The building that now houses the Jamme Masjid represents the history of successive communities of immigrants in this part of London. In 1743, this same building had been built as a French Protestant Church. In 1819, it became a Methodist Chapel, and then in 1898, it was used by Jewish people as the Spitalfields Great Synagogue. Following the increase in the number of Bengalis in the area, the Jews migrated to outlying suburbs of London, as they integrated with the majority British population. They sold off the synagogue, which then became the Jamme Masjid or 'Great London Mosque', which continues to serve the Bangladeshi community to this day. A film released in 2007, named after the street of Brick Lane itself, is based on a novel by author Monica Ali.

== Racial violence ==
=== 1970s and Altab Ali ===
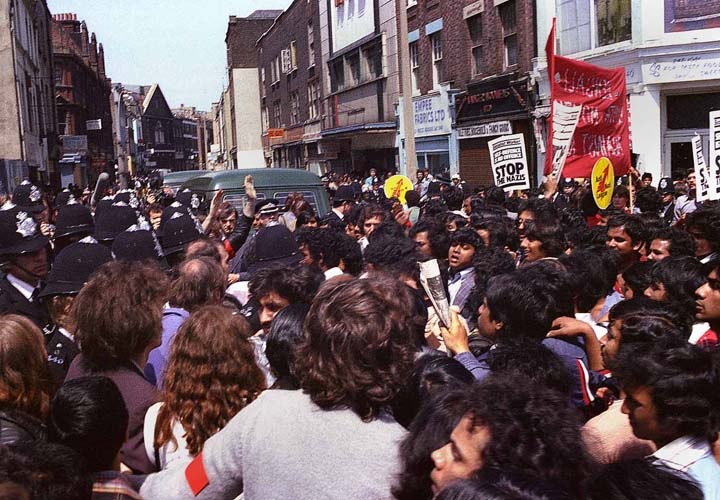
A demonstration against the National Front members in Brick Lane, during June 1978

In the 1970s, there was a large rise in the number of attacks on Bangladeshis. Racial tensions in the area had been simmering for 40 years, since Oswald Mosley incited attacks on the older Jewish communities in the 1930s. White power skinhead gangs began to roam the Brick Lane area, where they vandalised property and spat at Bengali children. In Bethnal Green, National Front members handed out leaflets on the streets and assembled people at a pub in Cheshire Street. Bengali children were allowed out of school early, with their mothers walking to work in groups to shield them from potential violence. Parents began to start imposing curfews on their children for their own safety. Later, the Tower Hamlets council fitted their flats with fire-proof letterboxes to protect Bangladeshi tenants from racially motivated arson.

Residents began to fight back by creating committees and youth groups such as the Bangladesh Youth Movement, which was formed by young activists led by Shajahan Lutfur. On 4 May 1978, Altab Ali, a 25-year-old was murdered in a racist attack, as he walked home from work. The murder took place near the corner of Adler Street and Whitechapel Road by St Mary's Churchyard. The killers were three teenage boys, Roy Arnold (17-year-old from Limehouse), Carl Ludlow (17-year-old from Bow) and unnamed mixed race 16-year-old boy who killed him, and they left a message on a nearby wall which said, "We’re back". This then led to over 7,000 Bangladeshis including others to take part in a demonstration against racist violence and marched behind Altab Ali's coffin to Number 10 Downing Street. Then in September 1978, the National Front moved its headquarters from Teddington in West London to Great Eastern Street, Shoreditch, a few minutes' walk from Brick Lane.

The name Altab Ali became associated with a movement of resistance against racist attacks, and remains linked with this struggle for human rights to this day. His murder was the trigger for the first significant political organisation against racism by local Bangladeshis. Today's phenomenal identification and association of British Bangladeshis with Tower Hamlets still owes much to this campaign. A park on Whitechapel Road is named after Altab Ali. The park is the main destination for demonstrations for the local people as of today. At the entrance to the park there is an arch created by David Peterson, developed as a memorial to Altab Ali and other victims of racist attacks. The arch incorporates a complex Bengali-style pattern, meant to show the merging of different cultures in East London.

=== 1990s ===
Incidents of racial violence started to occur in 1993 as a result of the British National Party (BNP). Several Bangladeshi students were severely injured in violent incidents. Racial violence started to occur again against the Bangladeshis and other ethnic groups, when during 1993 the BNP won a seat on the Isle of Dogs in the London Borough of Tower Hamlets. The party started to sell their newspapers in Brick Lane, and later that year, some party members attacked young Bangladeshi students. Both were seriously injured and were in a coma. Demonstrations later started to occur against the party, calling for a shut down, and led the party to abandon their normal paper-sell proceedings. One of the two Bangladeshis attacked was Quaddas Ali in September 1993, a 17 year old who was a student at Tower Hamlets College. In February 1994, Muktar Ahmed aged 19, was savagely beaten by a group of 20 white youths in Bethnal Green. This was followed by an attack by white youths the next day who were armed with iron bars and dogs, attacked students from Tower Hamlets College who were taking their lunch break in the nearby park. The next day another 14-year-old Bengali boy was stabbed in the face by four men on Bethnal Green Road.

== Official recognition ==
In April 2001, the London Borough of Tower Hamlets council officially renamed the 'Spitalfields' electoral ward to Spitalfields and Banglatown. Surrounding streets were redecorated, with lamp posts painted in green and red, which are the colours of the Bangladeshi flag.

== See also ==
- British Bangladeshi
- British Bangladeshi Who's Who
