= Sreedharpasha =

Sreedharpasha শ্রীধরপাশা
- Village
- Country: Bangladesh
- Division: Sylhet
- District: Sunamganj
- Upazila: Jagannathpur
- Union: Kolkolia

Population
  - Total: 3,190
- Time zone: UTC+6 (BST)
- Postal code: 3060
- Website: www.kolkoliaup.sunamganj.gov.bd

Sreedharpasha (Bengali: শ্রীধরপাশা) is a village located in Kolkolia Union, Jagannathpur Upazila, Sunamganj in the division of Sylhet, Bangladesh.

== Geography ==
Sreedharpasha is located at the north-western part of Jagannathpur Upazila within no. 2 ward of Kolkolia Union.

== Demography ==
Sreedharpasha has a population of 3,190. Among them, 1,584 are males and 1,606 are females.

== Administration ==
Sreedharpasha constitutes the no. 2 ward of Kolkolia Union of Jagannathpur Upazila.

== Education ==
The educational institutions of Sreedharpasha are:

- Sreedharpasha Govt. Primary School
- Sreedharpasha Darul Uloom Madrasa
