= Shahinur Pasha Chowdhury =

Bangladeshi politician

- শাহীনুর পাশা চৌধুরী

Member of the Bangladesh Parliament for Sunamganj-3
- In office 21 July 2005 – 28 October 2006
- Preceded by: Abdus Samad Azad
- Succeeded by: Muhammad Abdul Mannan

Personal details
- Born: 1970 (age 55–56) Patli, Jagannathpur, Sylhet District, East Pakistan
- Party: Bangladesh Khelafat Majlis (2024 – present)
- Other political affiliations: Trinomool BNP (2023 – 2024); Jamiat Ulema-e-Islam (1991 – 2023)
- Education: University of Dhaka
- Occupation: Politician

Religious life
- Religion: Islam
- Denomination: Sunni
- Jurisprudence: Hanafi
- Movement: Deobandi

Shahinur Pasha Chowdhury (Bengali: শাহীনুর পাশা চৌধুরী; born 1970) is a Bangladeshi politician from Bangladesh Khelafat Majlis. He was elected a member of parliament for the first time in July 2005 after the death of incumbent Abdus Samad Azad, a Awami League presidium member.

== Early life and education ==
Chowdhury was born in 1970 to a Bengali Muslim family in Patli Union, Jagannathpur, Sylhet District, East Pakistan (now Sunamganj District, Bangladesh). He completed a master's in hadith studies at the Jamia Qasimul Uloom Madrasa, and then completed a degree at the Murari Chand College. After that, he studied law at the University of Dhaka.

== Career ==
In 1991, Chowdhury was affiliated with Chhatra Jamiat Bangladesh. He was the central general secretary. He is the joint general secretary of the Jamiat Ulema-e-Islam Bangladesh. He was a member of parliament elected from Sunamganj-3 constituency. He was elected a member of parliament for the first time after the death of former foreign minister Abdus Samad Azad, a member of the Awami League Presidium in the 2005.

Chowdhury unsuccessfully contested the 2008 and 2018 elections as a candidate of the four party alliance led by Bangladesh Nationalist Party and Jatiya Oikya Front.

Chowdhury served as the legal affairs secretary of Hefazat-e-Islam Bangladesh in 2019–2020. He is the vice-president of Jamiat Ulema-e-Islam Bangladesh. On 7 May 2021, he was detained by Criminal Investigation Department from Sylhet following riots by Hefazat during a state visit of Prime Minister Narendra Modi. He joined Bangladesh Khelafat Majlis on 16 December 2024.
