= Longsight (ward) =

- Ward
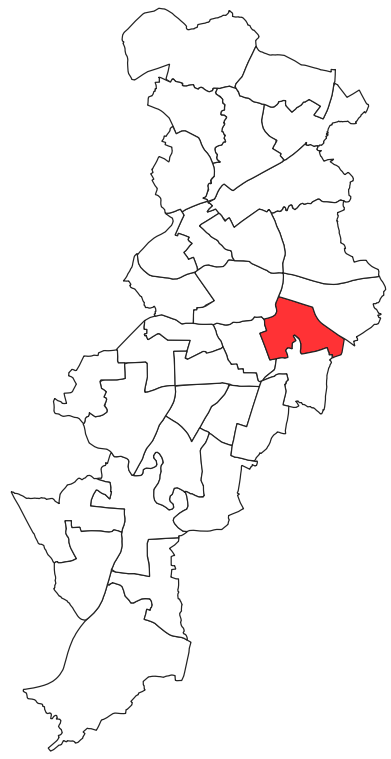
- Longsight ward (2018) within Manchester

- Coat of arms
- Country: United Kingdom
- Constituent country: England
- Region: North West England
- County: Greater Manchester
- Metropolitan borough: Manchester
- Created: November 1890
- Named for: Longsight

Government
  - Type: Unicameral
  - Body: Manchester City Council
- UK Parliamentary Constituency: Gorton and Denton

Longsight is an electoral division of Manchester City Council which has been represented since 1890. It covers the South Manchester suburb of Longsight, as well as a small part of Gorton.

== Overview ==
Longsight ward was created in 1890, as a result of the Manchester Extension Scheme 1890, which transferred the townships of Blackley, Crumpsall, Moston, Newton, Openshaw, and parts of Gorton to the Manchester corporation. Initially, it covered that part of the incorporated area of Gorton to the south of Hyde Road. In 1919, that part of the Rusholme ward to the east of Birchfields Road was transferred to the ward. Further city-wide boundary revisions in 1950 transferred that part of the ward to the east of the Crewe-Manchester Line to the St. Mark's ward. Another boundary revision in 1971 transferred that part of the former St. Mark's ward to the south of Hyde Road to the ward, these boundaries were unaffected by a further revision in 1982. In 2004, that part of the ward to the north of Daisy Bank Road and Kirmanshulme Lane was transferred to the Ardwick ward. At the latest revision in 2018,, that part of the former Gorton South ward between the Hope Valley Line and the Nico Ditch was transferred to the ward.

From its creation until 1918, the ward formed part of the Manchester South Parliamentary constituency. From 1918 until 1950, it was part of the Manchester Rusholme Parliamentary constituency. From 1950 until 1983, it was part of the Manchester Ardwick Parliamentary constituency. From 1983 until 2024, it was part of the Manchester Gorton Parliamentary constituency. Since 2024, it has formed part of the Gorton and Denton Parliamentary constituency.

== Councillors ==
Election	Councillor	Councillor	Councillor
1890	C. Jennison (Con)	G. H. Russell (Lib)	T. Uttley (Lib)
November 1890	C. Jennison (Con)	J. R. Wilson (Con)	T. Uttley (Lib)
1891	C. Jennison (Con)	J. R. Wilson (Con)	T. Uttley (Lib)
1892	C. Jennison (Con)	J. R. Wilson (Con)	T. Uttley (Lib)
1893	C. Jennison (Con)	J. R. Wilson (Con)	T. Uttley (Lib)
1894	C. Jennison (Con)	J. R. Wilson (Con)	T. Uttley (Lib)
1895	C. Jennison (Con)	J. R. Wilson (Con)	T. Uttley (Lib)
1896	C. Jennison (Con)	J. R. Wilson (Con)	T. Uttley (Lib)
1897	C. Jennison (Con)	J. R. Wilson (Con)	J. Jones (Con)
1898	C. Jennison (Con)	J. R. Wilson (Con)	J. Jones (Con)
1899	C. Jennison (Con)	J. R. Wilson (Con)	J. Jones (Con)
1900	C. Jennison (Con)	J. R. Wilson (Con)	J. Jones (Con)
1901	C. Jennison (Con)	J. R. Wilson (Con)	J. Jones (Con)
1902	C. Jennison (Con)	J. R. Wilson (Con)	J. Jones (Con)
1903	C. Jennison (Con)	J. R. Wilson (Con)	J. Jones (Con)
February 1904	O. Heggs (Lib)	J. R. Wilson (Con)	J. Jones (Con)
1904	O. Heggs (Lib)	J. R. Wilson (Con)	J. Jones (Con)
1905	O. Heggs (Lib)	J. R. Wilson (Con)	J. Jones (Con)
November 1905	O. Heggs (Lib)	H. Hodkin (Lib)	J. Jones (Con)
1906	O. Heggs (Lib)	H. Hodkin (Lib)	J. Jones (Con)
1907	O. Heggs (Lib)	H. Hodkin (Lib)	J. Jones (Con)
1908	A. Jennison (Con)	H. Hodkin (Lib)	J. Jones (Con)
1909	A. Jennison (Con)	H. Hodkin (Lib)	J. Jones (Con)
1910	A. Jennison (Con)	J. Wallwork (Con)	J. Jones (Con)
1911	A. Jennison (Con)	J. Wallwork (Con)	J. Jones (Con)
May 1912	A. Jennison (Con)	J. Wallwork (Con)	W. Cundiff (Con)
1912	A. Jennison (Con)	J. Wallwork (Con)	W. Cundiff (Con)
1913	A. Jennison (Con)	E. Whiteley (Lab)	W. Cundiff (Con)
1914	A. Jennison (Con)	E. Whiteley (Lab)	W. Cundiff (Con)
1919	A. Jennison (Con)	E. Whiteley (Lab)	W. Cundiff (Con)
1920	A. Jennison (Con)	I. J. Rogers (Con)	W. Cundiff (Con)
1921	A. Jennison (Con)	I. J. Rogers (Con)	W. Cundiff (Con)
1922	A. Jennison (Con)	I. J. Rogers (Con)	W. Cundiff (Con)
1923	A. Jennison (Con)	W. P. Jackson (Con)	W. Cundiff (Con)
1924	J. H. Meachin (Con)	W. P. Jackson (Con)	W. Cundiff (Con)
1925	J. H. Meachin (Con)	W. P. Jackson (Con)	W. Cundiff (Con)
1926	J. H. Meachin (Con)	W. P. Jackson (Con)	W. Cundiff (Con)
1927	J. H. Meachin (Con)	W. P. Jackson (Con)	W. Cundiff (Con)
1929	J. H. Meachin (Con)	W. P. Jackson (Con)	W. Cundiff (Con)
1929	J. H. Meachin (Con)	W. P. Jackson (Con)	W. Cundiff (Con)
1930	J. H. Meachin (Con)	W. P. Jackson (Con)	W. Cundiff (Con)
1932	J. H. Meachin (Con)	W. P. Jackson (Con)	W. Cundiff (Con)
1932	J. H. Meachin (Con)	W. P. Jackson (Con)	W. Cundiff (Con)
December 1932	J. H. Meachin (Con)	W. P. Jackson (Con)	W. N. Griffin (Con)
1933	J. H. Meachin (Con)	W. P. Jackson (Con)	W. N. Griffin (Con)
1934	J. H. Meachin (Con)	W. P. Jackson (Con)	W. N. Griffin (Con)
1935	J. H. Meachin (Con)	W. P. Jackson (Con)	W. N. Griffin (Con)
1936	J. H. Meachin (Con)	W. P. Jackson (Con)	W. N. Griffin (Con)
1937	J. H. Meachin (Con)	W. P. Jackson (Con)	W. N. Griffin (Con)
1938	J. H. Meachin (Con)	W. P. Jackson (Con)	W. N. Griffin (Con)
1945	E. Elliott (Con)	H. Sharp (Con)	W. N. Griffin (Con)
January 1946	J. G. Hopkins (Con)	E. Elliott (Con)	H. Sharp (Con)
1946	J. G. Hopkins (Con)	E. Elliott (Con)	H. Sharp (Con)
1947	J. G. Hopkins (Con)	E. Elliott (Con)	H. Sharp (Con)
1949	J. G. Hopkins (Con)	E. Elliott (Con)	H. Sharp (Con)
1950	J. G. Hopkins (Con)	E. Elliott (Con)	H. Sharp (Con)
1951	J. G. Hopkins (Con)	E. Elliott (Con)	H. Sharp (Con)
1952	J. G. Hopkins (Con)	E. Elliott (Con)	H. Sharp (Con)
1953	J. G. Hopkins (Con)	E. Elliott (Con)	H. Sharp (Con)
1954	J. G. Hopkins (Con)	F. J. Dunn (Con)	H. Sharp (Con)
1955	J. G. Hopkins (Con)	F. J. Dunn (Con)	H. Sharp (Con)
1956	J. G. Hopkins (Con)	F. J. Dunn (Con)	H. Sharp (Con)
1957	J. G. Hopkins (Con)	F. J. Dunn (Con)	H. Sharp (Con)
1958	J. G. Hopkins (Con)	F. J. Dunn (Con)	H. Sharp (Con)
1959	J. G. Hopkins (Con)	F. J. Dunn (Con)	H. Sharp (Con)
1960	J. G. Hopkins (Con)	F. J. Dunn (Con)	H. Sharp (Con)
1961	J. G. Hopkins (Con)	F. J. Dunn (Con)	H. Sharp (Con)
1962	J. G. Hopkins (Con)	F. J. Dunn (Con)	H. Sharp (Con)
1963	J. G. Hopkins (Con)	F. J. Dunn (Con)	H. Sharp (Con)
1964	J. G. Hopkins (Con)	F. J. Dunn (Con)	H. Sharp (Con)
1965	J. G. Hopkins (Con)	F. J. Dunn (Con)	H. Sharp (Con)
October 1965	J. G. Hopkins (Con)	F. J. Dunn (Con)	A. Malpas (Con)
February 1966	A. B. Deacy (Con)	F. J. Dunn (Con)	A. Malpas (Con)
1966	A. B. Deacy (Con)	F. J. Dunn (Con)	A. Malpas (Con)
1967	A. B. Deacy (Con)	F. J. Dunn (Con)	A. Malpas (Con)
1968	A. B. Deacy (Con)	F. J. Dunn (Con)	A. Malpas (Con)
1969	A. B. Deacy (Con)	F. J. Dunn (Con)	A. Malpas (Con)
1970	A. B. Deacy (Con)	F. Coombs (Con)	A. Malpas (Con)
1971	B. Anderson (Lab)	R. W. Ford (Lab)	M. A. Naqui (Lab)
1972	B. Anderson (Lab)	R. W. Ford (Lab)	M. A. Naqui (Lab)
1973	A. Malpas (Con)	R. W. Ford (Lab)	G. Taylor (Con)
1975	A. Malpas (Con)	R. W. Ford (Lab)	G. Taylor (Con)
1976	A. Malpas (Con)	R. W. Ford (Lab)	G. Taylor (Con)
1978	V. Stevens (Lab)	R. W. Ford (Lab)	G. Taylor (Con)
1979	V. Stevens (Lab)	R. W. Ford (Lab)	J. M. Wilson (Lab)
1980	V. Stevens (Lab)	R. W. Ford (Lab)	J. M. Wilson (Lab)
1982	J. Byrne (Lab)	K. Robinson (Lab)	K. Strath (Lab)
1983	J. Byrne (Lab)	K. Robinson (Lab)	K. Strath (Lab)
1984	J. Byrne (Lab)	K. Robinson (Lab)	K. Strath (Lab)
1986	N. Moghal (Lab)	K. Robinson (Lab)	K. Strath (Lab)
1987	N. Moghal (Lab)	K. Robinson (Lab)	K. Strath (Lab)
1988	N. Moghal (Lab)	K. Robinson (Lab)	K. Strath (Lab)
1990	N. Moghal (Lab)	K. Robinson (Lab)	K. Strath (Lab)
1991	N. Moghal (Lab)	K. Robinson (Lab)	K. Strath (Lab)
1992	N. Moghal (Lab)	K. Robinson (Lab)	K. Strath (Lab)
1994	N. Moghal (Lab)	K. Robinson (Lab)	K. Strath (Lab)
1995	N. Moghal (Lab)	K. Robinson (Lab)	K. Strath (Lab)
1996	N. Moghal (Lab)	M. Akhtar (Lab)	K. Strath (Lab)
1998	R. Saeed (Lab)	M. Akhtar (Lab)	K. Strath (Lab)
1999	R. Saeed (Lab)	M. Akhtar (Lab)	S. Hussain (Lab)
2000	R. Saeed (Lab)	A. Ahmed (Lab)	S. Hussain (Lab)
2002	Z. Ukairo (Lab)	A. Ahmed (Lab)	S. Hussain (Lab)
2003	Z. Ukairo (Lab)	A. Ahmed (Lab)	L. Ali (Lib Dem)
2004	Liaqat Ali (Lib Dem)	Abid Chohan (Lib Dem)	Mohammed Sajjad (Lib Dem)
2006	Liaqat Ali (Lib Dem)	Abid Chohan (Lib Dem)	Maryam Khan (Lab)
2007	Liaqat Ali (Lib Dem)	Abid Chohan (Lib Dem)	Maryam Khan (Lab)
February 2008	Liaqat Ali (Lib Dem)	Abid Chohan (Lab)	Maryam Khan (Lab)
2008	Luthfur Rahman (Lab)	Abid Chohan (Lab)	Maryam Khan (Lab)
2010	Luthfur Rahman (Lab)	Abid Chohan (Lab)	Suzanne Richards (Lab)
2011	Luthfur Rahman (Lab)	Abid Chohan (Lab)	Suzanne Richards (Lab)
2012	Luthfur Rahman (Lab)	Abid Chohan (Lab)	Suzanne Richards (Lab)
2014	Luthfur Rahman (Lab)	Abid Chohan (Lab)	Suzanne Richards (Lab)
2015	Luthfur Rahman (Lab)	Abid Chohan (Lab)	Suzanne Richards (Lab)
2016	Luthfur Rahman (Lab)	Abid Chohan (Lab)	Suzanne Richards (Lab)
2018	Abid Chohan (Lab)	Luthfur Rahman (Lab)	Suzanne Richards (Lab)
2019	Abid Chohan (Lab)	Luthfur Rahman (Lab)	Suzanne Richards (Lab)
2021	Abid Chohan (Lab)	Luthfur Rahman (Lab)	Suzanne Richards (Lab)
2022	Abid Chohan (Lab)	Luthfur Rahman (Lab)	Suzanne Richards (Lab)
2023	Abid Chohan (Lab)	Luthfur Rahman (Lab)	Suzanne Richards (Lab)
2024	Abid Chohan (Lab)	Shahbaz Sarwar (WPB)	Suzanne Richards (Lab)
2026	Asif Ranjha (Grn)	Shahbaz Sarwar (WPB)	Suzanne Richards (Lab)
July 2026	Asif Ranjha (Grn)	Shahbaz Sarwar (Lab)	Suzanne Richards (Lab)

== Elections ==
=== Elections in 2020s ===
==== May 2026 ====
2026
Party	Candidate	Votes	%	±%
Green	Asif Ranjha	2,307	47.4	+42.1
Labour	Abid Chohan*	1,524	31.3	−51.9
Workers Party	Tanvir Marth	460	9.5	N/A
Reform	Michael Chahwanda	384	7.9	N/A
Liberal Democrats	Kobe Bibbon	93	1.9	−2.6
Conservative	Faran Sikandar	83	1.7	−4.7
Communist League	Hugo Wils	12	0.2	N/A
Majority		783	16.1	N/A
Turnout		4,863	32.5	+9.3
Green gain from Labour		Swing		

==== May 2024 ====
2024
Party	Candidate	Votes	%	±%
Workers Party	Shahbaz Sarwar	2,444	46.0	New
Labour	Luthfur Rahman*	2,259	42.5	28.8 ▼
Green	Bernard Joseph Ekbery	253	4.8	0.1 ▼
Conservative	Liberty Rowe	164	3.1	14.2 ▼
Liberal Democrats	Liaqat Ali	110	2.1	2.4 ▼
Independent	Mohammed Aqib Raja	48	0.9	New
Majority		185	3.5	
Rejected ballots		38	0.7	
Turnout		5,316	38.02	
Registered electors		13,981		
Workers Party gain from Labour		Swing	37.4 ▲	

==== May 2023 ====
2023
Party	Candidate	Votes	%	±%
Labour	Suzanne Richards*	2,663	83.1	6.6▲
Conservative	Shahana Choudhury	259	8.1	2.4▼
Liberal Democrats	Kobe Bibbon	148	4.6	1.9▼
Green	Bernard Ekbery	135	4.2	1.6▼
Majority		2,404		
Rejected ballots		20		
Turnout			24.22%	
Registered electors		13,321		
Labour hold		Swing		

==== May 2022 ====
2022
Party	Candidate	Votes	%	±%
Labour	Abid Chohan*	2,527	83.2	4.2 ▲
Conservative	Shahana Choudhury	194	6.4	0.9 ▲
Green	Bernard Ekbery	162	5.3	0.3 ▼
Liberal Democrats	Kobe Bibbon	137	4.5	0.1 ▲
Majority		2,333	76.8	
Rejected ballots		19		
Turnout		3,039	23.2	5.8 ▼
Registered electors		13,105		
Labour hold		Swing	1.7 ▲	

==== May 2021 ====
2021
Party	Candidate	Votes	%	±%
Labour	Luthfur Rahman*	2,782	71.3	15.2 ▼
Conservative	Usman Arshed	674	17.3	11.7 ▲
Green	Bernard Eckbery	192	4.9	2.7 ▲
Liberal Democrats	Kobe Bibbon	174	4.5	0.3 ▲
Communist	Aaron Andrew	80	2.1	New
Majority		2,108	54.0	
Rejected ballots		44	1.1	
Turnout		3,946	30.2	1.2 ▲
Registered electors		13,086		
Labour hold		Swing	13.5 ▼	

=== Elections in 2010s ===
==== May 2019 ====
2019
Party	Candidate	Votes	%	±%
Labour	Suzanne Richards*	2,501	76.5	▲4.0
Conservative	Shahana Choudhary	344	10.5	▲5.6
Liberal Democrats	Kobe Bibbon	214	6.5	▲2.9
Green	Bernard Ekbery	189	5.8	▲0.2
Majority		2,157	65.9	▼1.0
Rejected ballots		23	0.70	
Turnout		3,271	26.44	▼2.5
Registered electors		12,370		
Labour hold		Swing	▼0.8	

==== May 2018 ====
2018 (3 vacancies; new boundaries)
Party	Candidate	Votes	%	±%
Labour	Abid Chohan*	2,821	79.0	
Labour	Luthfur Rahman*	2,655	74.3	
Labour	Suzanne Richards*	2,590	72.5	
Green	Bernard Ekbery	201	5.6	
Conservative	Javaid Hussain	197	5.5	
Conservative	Mark Shaw	172	4.8	
Liberal Democrats	Andrew Hickey	156	4.4	
Conservative	Joshua Phillips	150	4.2	
Liberal Democrats	Katie McKellar	132	3.7	
UKIP	Katie Fanning	130	3.6	
Liberal Democrats	Philip Stubbs	101	2.8	
Communist League	Catharina Tirsen	19	0.5	
Majority				
Turnout		3,573	29	
Labour win (new boundaries)				
Labour win (new boundaries)				
Labour win (new boundaries)				

==== May 2016 ====
2016
Party	Candidate	Votes	%	±%
Labour	Luthfur Rahman*	2,897	79.0	+3.0
Conservative	Anjnarra Huque	254	6.9	−5.1
Green	Vicky Matthews	219	6.0	−2.3
Liberal Democrats	Timothy Charles Crump	140	3.8	+0.1
Independent	Raees Ahmad Khan	134	3.7	n/a
TUSC	Mercedes Caccia Mesorio	24	0.7	n/a
Majority		2,643	72.1	
Turnout		3,668	36.4	
Labour hold		Swing		

==== May 2015 ====
2015
Party	Candidate	Votes	%	±%
Labour	Abid Latif Chohan*	4,516	75.9	+3.5
Green	Robyn Forsyth	636	10.7	+2.0
Conservative	Mohammed Afzal	459	7.7	+2.3
Liberal Democrats	Mohammed Sajid	175	3.0	−10.5
Independent	Raees Khan	110	1.8	N/A
TUSC	Nahella Ashraf	52	0.9	N/A
Majority		3,880	65.2	
Turnout		5,948	56.6	+21.1
Labour hold		Swing		

==== May 2014 ====
2014
Party	Candidate	Votes	%	±%
Labour	Suzanne Richards*	2,888	70.77	
Conservative	Mohammed Afzal	433	10.61	
Green	Ryan John Bestford	376	9.21	
Liberal Democrats	Liaqat Ali	275	6.74	
Independent	Mohammad Raisahmad Khan	109	2.67	
Majority		2,455	60.2	
Turnout		4,081	36	
Labour hold		Swing		

==== May 2012 ====
2012
Party	Candidate	Votes	%	±%
Labour	Luthfur Rahman*	2,754	76.0	+14.4
Conservative	Mohammed Afzal	436	12.0	+7.3
Green	Wendy Lynas	301	8.3	+1.0
Liberal Democrats	Mohammad Panwar	134	3.7	−22.7
Majority		2,318	64	
Turnout		3,625	31.95	
Labour hold		Swing		

==== May 2011 ====
2011
Party	Candidate	Votes	%	±%
Labour	Abid Chohan*	2,855	72.4	+34.9
Liberal Democrats	Jawaid Chaudhry	531	13.5	−34.0
Green	Ryan Bestford	343	8.7	−1.4
Conservative	Charles Bailey	212	5.4	−0.4
Majority		2,324	59.0	
Turnout		3,941	35.5	
Labour hold		Swing		

==== May 2010 ====
2010
Party	Candidate	Votes	%	±%
Labour	Suzanne Richards	2,639	49.1	−12.5
Liberal Democrats	Jawaid Iqbal Chaudhry	2,101	39.1	+12.7
Conservative	Tahir Mahmood Khan	351	6.5	+1.8
Respect	Martin Lambert	282	5.2	+5.2
Majority		538	10.0	−25.3
Turnout		5,373	52.9	+17.6
Labour hold		Swing	-12.6	

=== Elections in 2000s ===
==== May 2008 ====
2008
Party	Candidate	Votes	%	±%
Labour	Luthfur Rahman	2,005	61.6	+14.1
Liberal Democrats	Liaqat Ali*	858	26.4	−21.1
Green	Spencer Fitzgibbon	237	7.3	−2.8
Conservative	Daniel Valentine	153	4.7	−0.3
Majority		1,147	35.3	+25.3
Turnout		3,253	31.4	+0.0
Labour gain from Liberal Democrats		Swing	+17.6	

==== May 2007 ====
2007
Party	Candidate	Votes	%	±%
Liberal Democrats	Abid Latif Chohan*	1,506	47.5	+22.4
Labour	Sajjid Hussain	1,188	37.5	−17.1
Green	Spencer Fitzgibbon	320	10.1	−4.3
Conservative	Jane L'Anson	157	5.0	−0.9
Majority		318	10.0	−20.0
Turnout		3,171	31.4	−0.9
Liberal Democrats hold		Swing	+19.7	

==== May 2006 ====
2006
Party	Candidate	Votes	%	±%
Labour	Maryam Fazeela Khan	1,687	54.6	+24.4
Liberal Democrats	Mohammed Sajjad*	774	25.1	−19.2
Green	Hassan Ukairo	444	14.4	−1.7
Conservative	Zahir Ali	182	5.9	−3.5
Majority		913	30.0	+15.4
Turnout		3,087	32.3	−6.0
Labour gain from Liberal Democrats		Swing	+21.8	

==== June 2004 ====
2004 (3 vacancies; new boundaries)
Party	Candidate	Votes	%	±%
Liberal Democrats	Liaqat Ali*	1,661	42.9	
Liberal Democrats	Abid Chohan	1,622	41.9	
Liberal Democrats	Mohammed Sajjad	1,563	40.4	
Labour	Sajjad Hussain*	1,134	29.3	
Labour	Zeke Ukairo*	1,125	29.1	
Labour	Jawaid Chaudhry	1,121	29.0	
Green	Spencer Fitzgibbon	603	15.6	
Conservative	Zahir Ali	353	9.1	
Conservative	Vincent Pierce	307	7.9	
Conservative	Nigel Applewhite	304	7.9	
Majority		429	11.1	
Turnout		3,870	38.3	
Liberal Democrats win (new seat)				
Liberal Democrats win (new seat)				
Liberal Democrats win (new seat)				

==== May 2003 ====
2003
Party	Candidate	Votes	%	±%
Liberal Democrats	Liaqat Ali	1,152	44.6	+15.5
Labour	Sajjad Hussain*	1,000	38.7	−15.9
Green	Spencer Fitzgibbon	255	9.9	+0.8
Conservative	Karen Abbad	177	6.8	−0.4
Majority		152	5.9	−19.6
Turnout		2,584	20.0	−0.4
Liberal Democrats gain from Labour		Swing	+15.7	

==== May 2002 ====
2002
Party	Candidate	Votes	%	±%
Labour	Zeke Ukairo	1,521	54.6	−7.5
Liberal Democrats	Liaqat Ali	810	29.1	+19.2
Green	Spencer Fitzgibbon	255	9.1	−7.1
Conservative	Karen Abbad	202	7.2	−4.2
Majority		711	25.5	−20.4
Turnout		2,788	20.4	+2.3
Labour hold		Swing	-13.3	

==== May 2000 ====
2000
Party	Candidate	Votes	%	±%
Labour	Aftab Ahmed	1,461	62.1	+13.0
Green	Spencer Fitzgibbon	382	16.2	−0.1
Conservative	Karen Abbad	268	11.4	+2.9
Liberal Democrats	Rashid Ahmed	233	9.9	−15.8
Independent	Comrade Ibrahim	8	0.3	−0.1
Majority		1,079	45.9	+22.5
Turnout		2,352	18.1	−4.2
Labour hold		Swing	+6.5	

=== Elections in 1990s ===
==== May 1999 ====
1999
Party	Candidate	Votes	%	±%
Labour	Sajjad Hussain	1,369	49.1	−6.8
Liberal Democrats	Rashid Ahmed	717	25.7	+13.9
Green	Spencer Fitzgibbon	455	16.3	+1.0
Conservative	John Davenport	237	8.5	−3.2
Independent	Comrade Ibraham	12	0.4	+0.4
Majority		652	23.4	−17.2
Turnout		2,790	22.3	
Labour hold		Swing	-10.3	

==== May 1998 ====
1998
Party	Candidate	Votes	%	±%
Labour	Razak Saeed	1,314	55.9	+9.0
Green	Spencer Fitzgibbon	360	15.3	+6.3
Liberal Democrats	Abu Chowdhury	278	11.8	−1.0
Conservative	Paul Mostyn	274	11.7	−12.6
Socialist Labour	Hilary Partridge	123	5.2	+5.2
Majority		954	40.6	+18.0
Turnout		2,349		
Labour hold		Swing	+1.3	

==== May 1996 ====
1996
Party	Candidate	Votes	%	±%
Labour	Mohammed Akhtar	1,520	46.9	−10.6
Conservative	Muhammed Naqui	788	24.3	−2.3
Liberal Democrats	Abu Chowdhury	414	12.8	+5.1
Green	Spencer Fitzgibbon	293	9.0	+0.8
Independent Labour	M. Middleton	225	6.9	+6.9
Majority		732	22.6	−8.3
Turnout		3,240		
Labour hold		Swing	-4.1	

==== May 1995 ====
1995
Party	Candidate	Votes	%	±%
Labour	Ken Strath*	1,922	57.5	−11.1
Conservative	Muhammed Naqui	890	26.6	+13.6
Green	Spencer Fitzgibbon	275	8.2	+3.9
Liberal Democrats	M. Dunn	257	7.7	−5.3
Majority		1,032	30.9	−24.7
Turnout		3,344		
Labour hold		Swing	-12.3	

==== May 1994 ====
1994
Party	Candidate	Votes	%	±%
Labour	N. Moghal*	2,334	68.6	+14.6
Liberal Democrats	M. Dunn	443	13.0	+4.4
Conservative	D. Carroll	442	13.0	−18.5
Green	S. Fitzgibbon	146	4.3	−1.6
Independent	T. Rigby	36	1.1	+1.1
Majority		1,891	55.6	+33.1
Turnout		3,401		
Labour hold		Swing	+5.1	

==== May 1992 ====
1992
Party	Candidate	Votes	%	±%
Labour	K. Robinson*	1,673	54.0	+1.9
Conservative	M. Naqui	976	31.5	+6.1
Liberal Democrats	B. Pierce	265	8.6	−1.9
Green	J. Denham	184	5.9	−5.4
Majority		697	22.5	−4.9
Turnout		3,098		
Labour hold		Swing	-2.1	

==== May 1991 ====
1991
Party	Candidate	Votes	%	±%
Labour	K. S. Strath*	2,107	52.1	−12.1
Conservative	M. Naqui	1,013	25.4	+10.7
Green	J. E. Denham	453	11.3	−3.1
Liberal Democrats	B. I. Pierce	421	10.5	+3.9
Majority		1,094	27.4	−22.1
Turnout		3,994	35.5	
Labour hold		Swing	-11.4	

==== May 1990 ====
1990
Party	Candidate	Votes	%	±%
Labour	N. K. Moghal*	2,701	64.2	−4.1
Conservative	S. Hussain	619	14.7	+0.8
Green	J. E. Denham	607	14.4	+9.3
Liberal Democrats	B. I. Pierce	279	6.6	−6.1
Majority		2,082	49.5	−4.9
Turnout		4,206		
Labour hold		Swing	-2.4	

=== Elections in 1980s ===
==== May 1988 ====
1988
Party	Candidate	Votes	%	±%
Labour	K. Robinson*	2,801	68.3	+8.2
Conservative	D. Ferguson	571	13.9	−3.7
SLD	L. M. Moulding	520	12.7	−6.5
Green	L. A. King	207	5.1	+1.9
Majority		2,230	54.4	+13.5
Turnout		4,099		
Labour hold		Swing	+5.9	

==== May 1987 ====
1987
Party	Candidate	Votes	%	±%
Labour	Kenneth Strath*	2,837	60.1	−3.3
SDP	Rosalind Moss	905	19.2	−2.5
Conservative	Ian Ferguson	830	17.6	+6.3
Green	Robert Waters	151	3.2	−0.4
Majority		1,932	40.9	−0.9
Turnout		4,723		
Labour hold		Swing	-0.4	

==== May 1986 ====
1986
Party	Candidate	Votes	%	±%
Labour	N. Moghal	2,406	63.4	−0.8
SDP	D. Cox	822	21.7	+1.8
Conservative	M. Khan	430	11.3	−2.9
Green	J. McCahon	135	3.6	+3.6
Majority		1,584	41.8	−2.5
Turnout		3,793		
Labour hold		Swing	-1.3	

==== May 1984 ====
1984
Party	Candidate	Votes	%	±%
Labour	Kathleen Robinson*	2,622	64.2	+8.7
SDP	Altaf Ahmed	813	19.9	−4.3
Conservative	B. Carey	579	14.2	−4.6
Independent	M. Amin	69	1.7	+1.7
Majority		1,809	44.3	+13.0
Turnout		4,083		
Labour hold		Swing	+6.5	

==== May 1983 ====
1983
Party	Candidate	Votes	%	±%
Labour	Kenneth Strath*	2,665	55.5	+10.9
SDP	Altaf Ahmed	1,163	24.2	−8.9
Conservative	George Taylor	903	18.8	+1.2
Communist	Geoffrey Chandler	72	1.5	+1.5
Majority		1,502	31.3	+19.8
Turnout		4,803		
Labour hold		Swing	+9.9	

==== May 1982 ====
1982 (3 vacancies; new boundaries)
Party	Candidate	Votes	%	±%
Labour	John Byrne	1,875	43.5	
Labour	Kathleen Robinson	1,787	41.4	
Labour	Kenneth Strath	1,650	38.3	
SDP	Altaf Ahmed	1,394	32.3	
SDP	George Nevins	911	21.1	
SDP	Joseph Podbylski	798	18.5	
Conservative	Nigel Davidson	741	17.2	
Conservative	John Watson	736	17.1	
Conservative	William O'Grady	688	16.0	
Independent	Geoffrey Chandler	199	4.6	
Majority		256	6.0	
Turnout		4,313	36.6	
Labour win (new seat)				
Labour win (new seat)				
Labour win (new seat)				

==== May 1980 ====
1980
Party	Candidate	Votes	%	±%
Labour	R. W. Ford*	1,905	58.8	−1.5
Conservative	A. Malpas	974	30.1	−1.2
Liberal	M. Amin	269	8.3	−0.1
Communist	M. Cowie	91	2.8	+2.8
Majority		931	28.7	−0.4
Turnout		3,239	33.0	−33.8
Labour hold		Swing	+0.1	

=== Elections in 1970s ===
==== May 1979 ====
1979
Party	Candidate	Votes	%	±%
Labour	J. M. Wilson	3,837	60.3	+6.2
Conservative	G. Taylor*	1,989	31.3	−9.6
Liberal	M. Amin	534	8.4	+3.4
Majority		1,848	29.1	+9.7
Turnout		6,360	66.8	+32.4
Labour gain from Conservative		Swing	+7.9	

==== May 1978 ====
1978
Party	Candidate	Votes	%	±%
Labour	V. Stevens	2,007	54.1	+2.6
Conservative	A. Malpas*	1,516	40.9	−7.3
Liberal	C. R. Brammer	184	5.0	+5.0
Majority		491	13.2	+9.7
Turnout		3,707	34.4	
Labour gain from Conservative		Swing	+4.9	

==== May 1976 ====
1976
Party	Candidate	Votes	%	±%
Labour	R. W. Ford*	1,998	51.8	+6.8
Conservative	M. Delayen	1,862	48.2	−6.8
Majority		136	3.5	−6.5
Turnout		3,860		
Labour hold		Swing	+6.8	

==== May 1975 ====
1975
Party	Candidate	Votes	%	±%
Conservative	G. Taylor*	1,453	55.0	+5.8
Labour	A. Burns	1,189	45.0	−0.7
Majority		264	10.0	+6.5
Turnout		2,642		
Conservative hold		Swing	+3.2	

==== May 1973 ====
1973 (3 vacancies; reorganisation)
Party	Candidate	Votes	%	±%
Conservative	A. Malpas	1,565	48.2	+7.5
Labour	R. W. Ford*	1,454	44.7	−9.7
Conservative	G. Taylor	1,412	43.4	+2.7
Labour	S. N. M. Moxley*	1,392	42.8	−11.6
Conservative	M. Delayen	1,389	42.7	+2.0
Labour	B. Anderson*	1,369	42.1	−12.3
Independent	J. Kedward	160	4.9	+1.5
Majority		20	0.6	
Turnout		3,250		
Conservative gain from Labour		Swing		
Labour hold		Swing		
Conservative gain from Labour		Swing		

==== May 1972 ====
1972
Party	Candidate	Votes	%	±%
Labour	M. A. Naqui*	2,185	54.4	−5.2
Conservative	A. Malpas	1,634	40.7	+4.2
Residents	H. J. Barton	135	3.4	N/A
Communist	H. Johnson	59	1.5	−1.6
Majority		551	13.7	−5.7
Turnout		4,013		
Labour hold		Swing		

==== May 1971 ====
1971 (3 vacancies; new boundaries)
Party	Candidate	Votes	%	±%
Labour	B. Anderson	3,142	59.6	
Labour	R. W. Ford	3,005	57.0	
Labour	M. A. Naqui	2,950	55.9	
Conservative	A. B. Deacy*	1,925	36.5	
Conservative	A. Malpas*	1,906	36.1	
Conservative	F. Coombs*	1,893	35.9	
Independent	S. Khan	357	6.8	
Independent	A. Ahmed	263	5.0	
Union Movement	G. S. Gee	218	4.1	
Communist	H. Johnson	162	3.1	
Majority		1,025	19.4	
Turnout		5,274		
Labour win (new seat)				
Labour win (new seat)				
Labour win (new seat)				

==== May 1970 ====
1970 (2 vacancies)
Party	Candidate	Votes	%	±%
Conservative	A. B. Deacy*	1,632	54.4	−23.1
Conservative	F. Coombs	1,515	50.5	−27.0
Labour	H. Graham	1,256	41.9	+28.2
Labour	R. A. Reddington	1,133	37.8	+24.1
Union Movement	G. S. Gee	97	3.2	−1.4
Communist	H. Johnson	96	3.2	−1.1
Residents	B. Palmer	38	1.3	N/A
Majority		259	8.6	−55.2
Turnout		3,000		
Conservative hold		Swing		
Conservative hold		Swing		

=== Elections in 1960s ===
==== May 1969 ====
1969
Party	Candidate	Votes	%	±%
Conservative	F. J. Dunn*	1,650	77.5	−0.6
Labour	J. Broderick	291	13.7	+0.2
Union Movement	G. S. Gee	98	4.6	+1.1
Communist	H. Johnson	91	4.3	−0.6
Majority		1,359	63.8	−0.8
Turnout		2,130		
Conservative hold		Swing		

==== May 1968 ====
1968
Party	Candidate	Votes	%	±%
Conservative	A. Malpas*	1,748	78.1	+7.6
Labour	W. F. Lister	301	13.5	−9.1
Communist	H. Johnson	110	4.9	+1.7
Union Movement	J. R. Marsden	78	3.5	−0.2
Majority		1,447	64.6	+16.7
Turnout		2,237		
Conservative hold		Swing		

==== May 1967 ====
1967
Party	Candidate	Votes	%	±%
Conservative	A. B. Deacy*	1,593	70.5	+14.4
Labour	J. I. Owen	511	22.6	−16.2
Union Movement	W. D. Scarr	83	3.7	N/A
Communist	H. Johnson	74	3.2	+1.4
Majority		1,082	47.9	+20.6
Turnout		2,261		
Conservative hold		Swing		

==== May 1966 ====
1966
Party	Candidate	Votes	%	±%
Conservative	F. J. Dunn*	1,494	56.1	−10.4
Labour	A. Davidson	1,034	38.8	+8.8
Independent	V. J. Watson	87	3.3	N/A
Communist	H. Johnson	49	1.8	−1.7
Majority		460	17.3	−19.2
Turnout		2,664		
Conservative hold		Swing		

==== February 1966 (by-election) ====
By-election: 3 February 1966
Party	Candidate	Votes	%	±%
Conservative	A. B. Deacy	1,540	61.9	−4.6
Labour	S. V. Shaw	884	35.6	+5.6
Communist	H. Johnson	62	2.5	−1.0
Majority		656	26.3	−10.2
Turnout		2,486		
Conservative hold		Swing		

==== October 1965 (by-election) ====
By-election: 7 October 1965
Party	Candidate	Votes	%	±%
Conservative	A. Malpas	1,614	64.1	−2.4
Labour	S. V. Shaw	905	35.9	+5.9
Majority		709	28.2	−8.3
Turnout		2,519		
Conservative hold		Swing		

==== May 1965 ====
1965
Party	Candidate	Votes	%	±%
Conservative	H. Sharp*	2,060	66.5	+12.6
Labour	A. Davidson	930	30.0	+1.3
Communist	H. Johnson	110	3.5	−4.0
Majority		1,130	36.5	+11.3
Turnout		3,100		
Conservative hold		Swing		

==== May 1964 ====
1964
Party	Candidate	Votes	%	±%
Conservative	J. G. Hopkins*	1,902	53.9	+6.1
Labour	M. Johnson	1,014	28.7	−10.1
Liberal	F. N. Wedlock	350	9.9	−0.5
Communist	H. Johnson	261	7.5	+5.0
Majority		888	25.2	+15.2
Turnout		3,527		
Conservative hold		Swing		

==== May 1963 ====
1963
Party	Candidate	Votes	%	±%
Conservative	F. J. Dunn*	1,753	47.8	−9.5
Labour	J. Davis	1,421	38.8	+2.8
Liberal	C. E. Harfield	380	10.4	N/A
Communist	H. Johnson	93	2.5	−1.7
Union Movement	B. Keeling	19	0.5	−2.0
Majority		332	9.0	−12.3
Turnout		3,666		
Conservative hold		Swing		

==== May 1962 ====
1962
Party	Candidate	Votes	%	±%
Conservative	H. Sharp*	2,121	57.3	+4.7
Labour	A. Smith	1,334	36.0	+9.0
Communist	H. Johnson	155	4.2	+1.0
Union Movement	F. Dewhurst	93	2.5	N/A
Majority		787	21.3	−4.3
Turnout		3,703		
Conservative hold		Swing		

==== May 1961 ====
1961
Party	Candidate	Votes	%	±%
Conservative	J. G. Hopkins*	2,099	52.6	+12.4
Labour	B. Lawson	1,078	27.0	+2.1
Ratepayers	W. F. Wilding	683	17.1	−17.8
Communist	H. Johnson	129	3.2	N/A
Majority		1,021	25.6	+20.3
Turnout		3,989		
Conservative hold		Swing		

==== May 1960 ====
1960
Party	Candidate	Votes	%	±%
Conservative	F. J. Dunn*	1,681	40.2	−20.4
Ratepayers	A. H. Burlin	1,459	34.9	N/A
Labour	R. E. Talbot	1,043	24.9	−14.5
Majority		222	5.3	−15.9
Turnout		4,183		
Conservative hold		Swing		

=== Elections in 1950s ===
==== May 1959 ====
1959
Party	Candidate	Votes	%	±%
Conservative	H. Sharp*	2,490	60.6	+1.3
Labour	R. E. Talbot	1,619	39.4	−1.3
Majority		871	21.2	+2.6
Turnout		4,109		
Conservative hold		Swing		

==== May 1958 ====
1958
Party	Candidate	Votes	%	±%
Conservative	J. G. Hopkins*	2,360	59.3	+6.4
Labour	R. E. Talbot	1,618	40.7	−6.4
Majority		742	18.6	+12.8
Turnout		3,978		
Conservative hold		Swing		

==== May 1957 ====
1957
Party	Candidate	Votes	%	±%
Conservative	F. J. Dunn*	2,217	52.9	−4.1
Labour	J. Davis	1,977	47.1	+4.1
Majority		240	5.8	−8.2
Turnout		4,194		
Conservative hold		Swing		

==== May 1956 ====
1956
Party	Candidate	Votes	%	±%
Conservative	H. Sharp*	2,248	57.0	−7.2
Labour	J. Davis	1,694	43.0	+7.2
Majority		554	14.0	−14.4
Turnout		3,942		
Conservative hold		Swing		

==== May 1955 ====
1955
Party	Candidate	Votes	%	±%
Conservative	J. G. Hopkins*	3,048	64.2	+6.8
Labour	J. Davis	1,696	35.8	−6.8
Majority		1,352	28.4	+13.6
Turnout		4,744		
Conservative hold		Swing		

==== May 1954 ====
1954
Party	Candidate	Votes	%	±%
Conservative	F. J. Dunn	2,880	57.4	+2.3
Labour	J. Davis	2,136	42.6	+6.8
Majority		744	14.8	−5.5
Turnout		5,016		
Conservative hold		Swing		

==== May 1953 ====
1953
Party	Candidate	Votes	%	±%
Conservative	H. Sharp*	3,161	55.1	+1.8
Labour	J. Davis	1,996	35.8	−2.2
Liberal	F. N. Wedlock	584	10.1	+0.4
Majority		1,265	20.3	+4.0
Turnout		5,741		
Conservative hold		Swing		

==== May 1952 ====
1952
Party	Candidate	Votes	%	±%
Conservative	J. Hopkins*	3,315	53.3	−11.0
Labour	J. B. Ogden	2,303	37.0	+10.4
Liberal	F. N. Wedlock	607	9.7	+0.6
Majority		1,012	16.3	−21.4
Turnout		6,225		
Conservative hold		Swing		

==== May 1951 ====
1951
Party	Candidate	Votes	%	±%
Conservative	E. Elliott*	3,638	64.3	−0.6
Labour	J. Conway	1,508	26.6	−8.5
Liberal	F. N. Wedlock	513	9.1	N/A
Majority		2,130	37.7	+7.9
Turnout		5,659		
Conservative hold		Swing		

==== May 1950 ====
1950 (new boundaries)
Party	Candidate	Votes	%	±%
Conservative	H. Sharp*	4,028	64.9	
Labour	J. Conway	2,177	35.1	
Majority		1,851	29.8	
Turnout		6,205		
Conservative hold		Swing		

=== Elections in 1940s ===
==== May 1949 ====
1949
Party	Candidate	Votes	%	±%
Conservative	J. G. Hopkins*	5,945	57.7	−2.8
Labour	A. Lees	3,666	35.6	−3.9
Liberal	C. T. Ashton	691	6.7	N/A
Majority		2,279	22.1	+1.1
Turnout		10,302		
Conservative hold		Swing		

==== November 1947 ====
1947
Party	Candidate	Votes	%	±%
Conservative	E. Elliott*	6,861	60.5	+8.2
Labour	F. Donlon	4,483	39.5	−3.9
Majority		2,378	21.0	+12.1
Turnout		11,344		
Conservative hold		Swing		

==== November 1946 ====
1946
Party	Candidate	Votes	%	±%
Conservative	H. Sharp*	4,437	52.3	+1.1
Labour	J. W. Upland	3,683	43.4	−5.4
Liberal	A. Foxton	364	4.3	N/A
Majority		754	8.9	+8.0
Turnout		8,484		
Conservative hold		Swing		

==== January 1946 (by-election) ====
By-election: 31 January 1946
Party	Candidate	Votes	%	±%
Conservative	J. G. Hopkins	2,990	55.3	+4.1
Labour	G. Whalley	2,421	44.7	−4.1
Majority		569	10.4	+9.5
Turnout		5,411		
Conservative hold		Swing		

==== November 1945 ====
1945 (2 vacancies)
Party	Candidate	Votes	%	±%
Conservative	E. Elliot*	4,006	51.2	−8.1
Conservative	H. Sharp*	3,892	49.7	−9.6
Labour	D. Rock	3,820	48.8	+8.1
Labour	G. Whalley	3,732	47.7	+7.0
Majority		72	0.9	−17.7
Turnout		7,826	41.9	
Conservative hold		Swing		
Conservative hold		Swing		

=== Elections in 1930s ===
==== November 1938 ====
1938
Party	Candidate	Votes	%	±%
Conservative	W. P. Jackson*	3,031	59.3	+2.3
Labour	F. Walker	2,084	40.7	−2.3
Majority		947	18.6	+4.6
Turnout		5,115		
Conservative hold		Swing		

==== November 1937 ====
1937
Party	Candidate	Votes	%	±%
Conservative	W. N. Griffin*	2,442	57.0	−11.5
Labour	F. Walker	1,843	43.0	+11.5
Majority		599	14.0	−23.0
Turnout		4,285		
Conservative hold		Swing		

==== November 1936 ====
1936
Party	Candidate	Votes	%	±%
Conservative	J. H. Meachin*	2,990	68.5	+2.4
Labour	C. W. Jones	1,372	31.5	−2.4
Majority		1,618	37.0	+4.8
Turnout		4,362		
Conservative hold		Swing		

==== November 1935 ====
1935
Party	Candidate	Votes	%	±%
Conservative	W. P. Jackson*	2,793	66.1	+3.9
Labour	I. E. Thorley	1,435	33.9	−3.9
Majority		1,358	32.2	+7.8
Turnout		4,228		
Conservative hold		Swing		

==== November 1934 ====
1934
Party	Candidate	Votes	%	±%
Conservative	W. N. Griffin*	2,350	62.2	N/A
Labour	I. E. Thorley	1,429	37.8	N/A
Majority		921	24.4	N/A
Turnout		3,770		
Conservative hold		Swing		

==== November 1933 ====
1933
Party	Candidate	Votes	%	±%
Conservative	J. H. Meachin*	uncontested		
Conservative hold		Swing		

==== December 1932 (by-election) ====
By-election: 20 December 1932
Party	Candidate	Votes	%	±%
Conservative	W. N. Griffin	1,782	67.1	−2.5
Labour	A. Lees	804	30.3	N/A
Residents	A. R. Edwards	68	2.6	N/A
Majority		978	36.8	−2.4
Turnout		2,654		
Conservative hold		Swing		

==== November 1932 ====
1932
Party	Candidate	Votes	%	±%
Conservative	W. P. Jackson*	2,498	69.6	N/A
Independent Labour	W. L. Wilson	1,093	30.4	N/A
Majority		1,405	39.2	N/A
Turnout		3,591		
Conservative hold		Swing		

==== November 1931 ====
1931
Party	Candidate	Votes	%	±%
Conservative	W. Cundiff*	uncontested		
Conservative hold		Swing		

==== November 1930 ====
1930
Party	Candidate	Votes	%	±%
Conservative	J. H. Meachin*	3,402	72.7	+7.9
Labour	J. Garside	1,278	27.3	−7.9
Majority		2,124	45.4	+15.8
Turnout		4,680		
Conservative hold		Swing		

=== Elections in 1920s ===
==== November 1929 ====
1929
Party	Candidate	Votes	%	±%
Conservative	W. P. Jackson*	2,718	64.8	+2.5
Labour	J. Garside	1,474	35.2	−2.0
Majority		1,244	29.6	+4.5
Turnout		4,192	38.6	−15.2
Conservative hold		Swing		

==== November 1928 ====
1928
Party	Candidate	Votes	%	±%
Conservative	W. Cundiff*	3,466	62.3	−1.6
Labour	F. Gregson	2,069	37.2	N/A
Residents	N. E. Walker	24	0.4	N/A
Majority		1,397	25.1	−2.7
Turnout		5,559	53.8	+12.9
Conservative hold		Swing		

==== November 1927 ====
1927
Party	Candidate	Votes	%	±%
Conservative	J. H. Meachin*	2,713	63.9	+5.3
Liberal	G. Jennison	1,533	36.1	N/A
Majority		1,180	27.8	+10.6
Turnout		4,246	40.9	−15.9
Conservative hold		Swing		

==== November 1926 ====
1926
Party	Candidate	Votes	%	±%
Conservative	W. P. Jackson*	3,475	58.6	−9.0
Labour	T. F. Banville	2,451	41.4	N/A
Majority		1,024	17.2	+23.0
Turnout		5,926	56.8	+2.4
Conservative hold		Swing		

==== November 1925 ====
1925
Party	Candidate	Votes	%	±%
Conservative	W. Cundiff*	3,783	67.6	+22.0
Co-operative Party	T. Anderson	1,536	27.4	N/A
Independent	M. E. Greenwood	280	5.0	−15.1
Majority		2,247	40.2	+14.7
Turnout		5,599	54.4	
Conservative hold		Swing		

==== November 1924 ====
1924
Party	Candidate	Votes	%	±%
Conservative	J. H. Meachin	2,469	45.6	−15.1
Independent	M. E. Greenwood	1,089	20.1	N/A
Labour	E. J. Hookway	1,089	20.1	N/A
Liberal	J. Whittle	764	14.1	N/A
Majority		1,380	25.5	+4.1
Turnout		5,411		
Conservative hold		Swing		

==== November 1923 ====
1923
Party	Candidate	Votes	%	±%
Conservative	W. P. Jackson	2,737	60.7	N/A
Co-operative Party	E. E. Beavan	1,772	39.3	N/A
Majority		965	21.4	N/A
Turnout		4,509		
Conservative hold		Swing		

==== November 1922 ====
1922
Party	Candidate	Votes	%	±%
Conservative	W. Cundiff*	uncontested		
Conservative hold		Swing		

==== November 1921 ====
1921
Party	Candidate	Votes	%	±%
Conservative	A. Jennison*	2,661	61.3	−0.2
Liberal	A. L. Taylor	1,678	38.7	N/A
Majority		983	22.6	−0.4
Turnout		4,339	50.1	−7.8
Conservative hold		Swing		

==== November 1920 ====
1920
Party	Candidate	Votes	%	±%
Conservative	I. J. Rogers	3,082	61.5	+9.5
Labour	E. Whiteley*	1,932	38.5	−9.5
Majority		1,150	23.0	+19.0
Turnout		5,014	57.9	+18.8
Conservative gain from Labour		Swing		

=== Elections in 1910s ===
==== November 1919 ====
1919 (new boundaries)
Party	Candidate	Votes	%	±%
Conservative	W. Cundiff*	1,757	52.0	
Labour	E. J. Hookway	1,625	48.0	
Majority		132	4.0	
Turnout		3,382	39.1	
Conservative hold		Swing		

==== November 1914 ====
1914
Party	Candidate	Votes	%	±%
Conservative	A. Jennison*	uncontested		
Conservative hold		Swing		

==== November 1913 ====
1913
Party	Candidate	Votes	%	±%
Labour	E. Whiteley	1,182	52.4	+14.7
Conservative	R. Bothwell	1,073	47.6	−14.7
Majority		109	4.8	
Turnout		2,255		
Labour gain from Conservative		Swing		

==== November 1912 ====
1912
Party	Candidate	Votes	%	±%
Conservative	W. Cundiff*	1,120	62.3	+8.0
Labour	G. Hall	679	37.7	−8.0
Majority		441	24.6	+16.0
Turnout		1,799		
Conservative hold		Swing		

==== May 1912 (by-election) ====
By-election: 14 May 1912
Party	Candidate	Votes	%	±%
Conservative	W. Cundiff	985	55.2	+0.9
Labour	R. J. Davies	801	44.8	−0.9
Majority		184	10.4	+1.8
Turnout		1,786		
Conservative hold		Swing		

==== November 1911 ====
1911
Party	Candidate	Votes	%	±%
Conservative	A. Jennison*	1,299	54.3	+11.3
Labour	R. J. Davies	1,092	45.7	+25.4
Majority		207	8.6	+2.3
Turnout		2,391		
Conservative hold		Swing		

==== November 1910 ====
1910
Party	Candidate	Votes	%	±%
Conservative	J. Wallwork	1,054	43.0	−8.9
Liberal	H. Hodkin*	900	36.7	+15.3
Labour	G. Hall	498	20.3	−6.4
Majority		154	6.3	−18.9
Turnout		2,452		
Conservative gain from Liberal		Swing		

=== Elections in 1900s ===
==== November 1909 ====
1909
Party	Candidate	Votes	%	±%
Conservative	J. Jones*	1,281	51.9	+3.0
Labour	G. Hall	658	26.7	+6.2
Liberal	W. Radcliffe	529	21.4	−9.2
Majority		623	25.2	+6.9
Turnout		2,468		
Conservative hold		Swing		

==== November 1908 ====
1908
Party	Candidate	Votes	%	±%
Conservative	A. Jennison	1,260	48.9	+16.1
Liberal	O. Heggs*	790	30.6	−13.2
Labour	A. E. Wachter	528	20.5	−2.9
Majority		470	18.3	
Turnout		2,578		
Conservative gain from Liberal		Swing		

==== November 1907 ====
1907
Party	Candidate	Votes	%	±%
Liberal	H. Hodkin*	911	43.8	N/A
Conservative	W. H. Cook	682	32.8	−25.3
Labour	T. A. Flynn	486	23.4	−18.5
Majority		229	11.0	
Turnout		2,079		
Liberal hold		Swing		

==== November 1906 ====
1906
Party	Candidate	Votes	%	±%
Conservative	J. Jones*	1,098	58.1	+20.0
Labour	R. McDonald	792	41.9	N/A
Majority		306	16.2	
Turnout		1,890		
Conservative hold		Swing		

==== November 1905 (by-election) ====
By-election: 15 November 1905
Party	Candidate	Votes	%	±%
Liberal	H. Hodkin	uncontested		
Liberal gain from Conservative		Swing		

==== November 1905 ====
1905
Party	Candidate	Votes	%	±%
Liberal	O. Heggs*	1,232	61.9	+12.9
Conservative	W. Cundiff	759	38.1	−12.9
Majority		473	23.8	
Turnout		1,991		
Liberal hold		Swing		

==== November 1904 ====
1904
Party	Candidate	Votes	%	±%
Conservative	J. R. Wilson*	1,011	51.0	N/A
Liberal	H. Hodkin	972	49.0	N/A
Majority		39	2.0	N/A
Turnout		1,983		
Conservative hold		Swing		

==== February 1904 (by-election) ====
By-election: 16 February 1904
Party	Candidate	Votes	%	±%
Liberal	O. Heggs	1,026	57.1	N/A
Conservative	A. Jennison	770	42.9	N/A
Majority		256	14.2	N/A
Turnout		1,796		
Liberal gain from Conservative		Swing		

==== November 1903 ====
1903
Party	Candidate	Votes	%	±%
Conservative	J. Jones*	uncontested		
Conservative hold		Swing		

==== November 1902 ====
1902
Party	Candidate	Votes	%	±%
Conservative	C. Jennison*	uncontested		
Conservative hold		Swing		

==== November 1901 ====
1901
Party	Candidate	Votes	%	±%
Conservative	J. R. Wilson*	uncontested		
Conservative hold		Swing		

==== November 1900 ====
1900
Party	Candidate	Votes	%	±%
Conservative	J. Jones*	uncontested		
Conservative hold		Swing		

=== Elections in 1890s ===
==== November 1899 ====
1899
Party	Candidate	Votes	%	±%
Conservative	C. Jennison*	991	62.5	N/A
Liberal	D. Armstrong	595	37.5	N/A
Majority		396	25.0	N/A
Turnout		1,586		
Conservative hold		Swing		

==== November 1898 ====
1898
Party	Candidate	Votes	%	±%
Conservative	J. R. Wilson*	uncontested		
Conservative hold		Swing		

==== November 1897 ====
1897
Party	Candidate	Votes	%	±%
Conservative	J. Jones	1,033	56.8	N/A
Liberal	T. Uttley*	786	43.2	N/A
Majority		247	13.6	N/A
Turnout		1,819		
Conservative gain from Liberal		Swing		

==== November 1896 ====
1896
Party	Candidate	Votes	%	±%
Conservative	C. Jennison*	uncontested		
Conservative hold		Swing		

==== November 1895 ====
1895
Party	Candidate	Votes	%	±%
Conservative	J. R. Wilson*	867	52.5	+3.2
Ind. Labour Party	N. Lingard	784	47.5	N/A
Majority		83	5.0	
Turnout		1,651		
Conservative hold		Swing		

==== November 1894 ====
1894
Party	Candidate	Votes	%	±%
Liberal	T. Uttley*	783	50.7	N/A
Conservative	J. Jones	762	49.3	N/A
Majority		21	1.4	N/A
Turnout		1,545		
Liberal hold		Swing		

==== November 1893 ====
1893
Party	Candidate	Votes	%	±%
Conservative	C. Jennison*	uncontested		
Conservative hold		Swing		

==== November 1892 ====
1892
Party	Candidate	Votes	%	±%
Conservative	J. R. Wilson*	uncontested		
Conservative hold		Swing		

==== November 1891 ====
1891
Party	Candidate	Votes	%	±%
Liberal	T. Uttley*	uncontested		
Liberal hold		Swing		

==== November 1890 (by-election) ====
By-election: 30 November 1890
Party	Candidate	Votes	%	±%
Conservative	J. R. Wilson	807	51.5	−8.7
Liberal	J. Heys	759	48.5	−9.3
Majority		48	3.0	
Turnout		1,566		
Conservative gain from Liberal		Swing		

==== November 1890 ====
1890 (3 vacancies)
Party	Candidate	Votes	%	±%
Conservative	C. Jennison	1,014	60.2	
Liberal	G. H. Russell	974	57.8	
Liberal	T. Uttley	855	50.8	
Conservative	C. Kay	780	46.3	
Conservative	E. Dodd	731	43.4	
Liberal	E. N. Worthington	698	41.4	
Majority		75	4.5	
Turnout		1,684		
Conservative win (new seat)				
Liberal win (new seat)				
Liberal win (new seat)				

== See also ==
- Manchester City Council
- Manchester City Council elections
