= Abdus Samad Azad =

Bangladeshi politician (1922–2005)

- আব্দুস সামাদ আজাদ
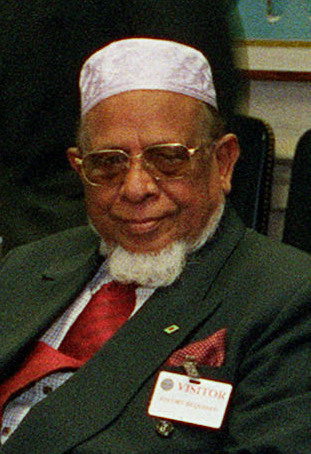
- Azad in 2000

Minister of Foreign Affairs
- In office 23 June 1996 – 15 July 2001
- Preceded by: ASM Mustafizur Rahman
- Succeeded by: Badruddoza Chowdhury
- In office 1 December 1971 – 16 March 1973
- Preceded by: Khondaker Mostaq Ahmad
- Succeeded by: Kamal Hossain

Member of Parliament
- In office 28 February 1991 – 27 April 2005
- Preceded by: Faruk Rashid Chowdhury
- Succeeded by: Shahinur Pasha Chowdhury
- Constituency: Sunamganj-3
- In office 7 March 1973 – 6 November 1975
- Preceded by: Constituency Created
- Succeeded by: Suranjit Sengupta
- Constituency: Sylhet-2

Personal details
- Born: 15 January 1922 Jagannathpur, Assam, British India
- Died: 27 April 2005 (aged 83) Dhaka, Bangladesh
- Resting place: Banani graveyard
- Party: Awami League
- Education: Murari Chand College University of Dhaka
- Occupation: Politician, teacher
- Known for: Bengali language movement

Abdus Samad Azad (Bengali: আব্দুস সামাদ আজাদ; 15 January 1922 – 27 April 2005) was a Bangladeshi diplomat and politician. He was elected to Bangladesh's parliament five times from 1970 to 2001. He was also elected Member of Lower Assembly in the Parliament of the then East Pakistan. He became President of the Muslim Student Federation of All - Asam in 1946 and led the Language Movement in 1952.

== Early life ==
Azad was born on 15 January 1922 in the village of Bhurakhali, Jagannathpur, Sunamganj, Sylhet, Assam in the then British India. He passed matriculation from Government Jubilee High School, Sunamganj in 1943 and graduated from Murari Chand College, Sylhet in 1948. Then he was admitted to Dhaka University and completed M.A in Law and History. But he was deprived of his degree by the then Government because of his involvement in the movement against British.

== Career ==
Azad joined the All Bengal Muslim Students’ Association in the 1940s as the President of Sunamganj unit. He supported the Pakistan movement. In 1952, he was imprisoned for his role in the Bengali language movement. He worked as a school teacher and was known as 'Master Sab’ and then an insurance man. He was elected to the East Pakistan Provincial Assembly in 1954 as a candidate of the United Front. In 1954, he joined the Awami League. He served as the league's labor secretary. He left the league in 1957 with other leftist politicians led by Abdul Hamid Khan Bhashani. He returned to Awami League in 1969 and was elected to the National Assembly of Pakistan in 1970.

Azad was a leader and an executive member of the Awami League and a friend to Sheikh Mujibur Rahman by 1970 when he became the chief representative of the Bangladeshi independence movement in exile, helping the movement get international support while Mujibur Rahman was imprisoned. When independence for Bangladesh was achieved in 1971, Azad became its first foreign minister, in the Mujibur Rahman government. He served in that position until 1973 and then became agriculture minister. He was replaced by Kamal Hossain as the foreign minister. Azad did not support the 1975 military coup in which Mujibur Rahman was killed. He was imprisoned until 1978. In 1996, when the Awami League came back to power under Mujibur Rahman's daughter, Sheikh Hasina, Azad was appointed as the foreign minister again. He served in that position until 2001 when the Awami League lost the election. He was elected to Jatiya Sangsad in 1991, 1996 and 2001.

== Death ==
Azad died at a hospital in Dhaka of stomach cancer on 27 April 2005.
