= Dewan Shamsul Abedin =

Bangladeshi politician

- দেওয়ান সামসুল আবেদিন

Member of Parliament from Sylhet-3 (now Sunamganj-3)
- Preceded by: Abdur Raich
- Succeeded by: Humayun Rashid Choudhury
- In office 1979–1986

Personal details
- Born: Sunamganj, Bangladesh
- Died: 26 April, 2026 Sunamganj
- Party: Bangladesh Nationalist Party
- Relatives: Hason Raja

Dewan Shamsul Abedin is a Bangladeshi politician. From Sunamganj-3 constituency, he was elected Member of Parliament for Bangladesh Nationalist Party in the Second National Parliament Election of 1979.

== Birth and early life ==
Dewan Shamsul Abedin was born in Sunamganj district of Sylhet division.

== Political life ==
Dewan Shamsul Abedin is a leader of the Bangladesh Nationalist Party. From Sunamganj-3 constituency, he was elected Member of Parliament for Bangladesh Nationalist Party in the Second National Parliament Election of 1979.

== See also ==
- Sunamganj-3
- 1979 Bangladeshi general election
