= Ayub Ali Master =

British Bangladeshi social reformer, politician and entrepreneur

Ayub Ali
- আইয়ুব আলী মাস্টার
- Born: 1 January 1880 (estimate); Achol, Jagannathpur, Sylhet District, North-East Frontier, British India
- Died: 1 April 1980 (aged 99–100); Hason-Fatehpur, Jagannathpur Upazila, Sunamganj District, Bangladesh
- Citizenship: British
- Occupations: Businessman, social worker, treasurer, politician
- Organization: Indian Seamen's Welfare League
- Known for: One of the early founders of the British Bangladeshi community
- Political party: United Kingdom Muslim League
- Board member of: India League
- Children: 3

Ayub Ali Master (Bengali: আইয়ুব আলী মাস্টার; died 1980), was an early British Bangladeshi social reformer, politician and entrepreneur. He is notable for pioneering social welfare work for many early British Asians. He established a boardinghouse known as "Number 13" in his home which provided many facilities for British Asians. He is one of the earliest of Sylhetis to arrive in the United Kingdom, now hosting one of the largest Bangladeshi diaspora communities outside of Bangladesh and due to this, he was amongst the famous household names in the Sylhet region during his time referred to as the brave jahazis (sailors). His family is also notable as entrepreneurs and businessmen.

== Early life ==
Ali was born into a Bengali Muslim family from the Achol village of Jagannathpur in the Sylhet District of the British India's North-East Frontier. It is unknown how, but he later migrated to the United States of America. He came to the United Kingdom as an ex-lascar with his brother Shamsul Haque.

== Career ==
On a ship going from the United States to the Tilbury Docks of England, Ali arrived in the United Kingdom in late 1919. During this time, there was a sizeable minority of British Asians and a high demand for South Asian cuisine as there were not many restaurants serving home cuisines. Ali started his career in 1920 by founding the Shah Jalal Restaurant and Coffee House in Commercial Street. The restaurant was popular to a great extent and served as a hub for the British Asian community. Many important meetings were also held here such as one for the India League launched by V. K. Krishna Menon on 13 June 1943 and around eighty Asian lascars and factory workers as well as three Europeans were present. Other figures who frequented the restaurant include Narayana Menon and Mulk Raj Anand.

Ali moved to 13 Sandys Row in the East End of London in 1945. He continued living there until 1959. Through the restaurant and his home, Ali was also able to support other ex-lascars and help them find employment. He would provide food, education and shelter gratis in his own home as well. Ali was proficient in the English language, and so was able to also write letters for the men and allow them to also send remittances back to their families abroad. It is considered that during this period, the nickname of "Master" was ascribed to Ali due to his literary ability. This is because 'Master' translates to 'teacher' in Bengali.

In 1943, Ali and his acquaintance Shah Abdul Majid Qureshi founded the Indian Seamen's Welfare League with intentions to promote the social welfare of lascars. It assisted Indians, mainly Sylhetis, with official paperwork and also helped them communicate with their relatives back home. Its first meeting took place on 14 July 1943 in King's Hall, Commercial Street, London. The meeting attracted mostly Bengali Muslims but dozens of Europeans were also present. Later, the organisation was renamed to the Indian Seamen's Welfare League to sound less political. V. K. Krishna Menon also made Ali the treasurer of the East End branch of his India League. Ali was also the president of the All-India Muslim League having links with Liaquat Ali Khan and Mohammad Ali Jinnah.

At a later stage in his life, Ali founded a travel agency business in his house called Orient Travels. This was later moved to Brick Lane, which has now become the capital of the British Bangladeshi community. He then returned to his home in Achol, Jagannathpur in the newly independent country of Bangladesh where he became a member of his local Union Parishad. He renamed his village of Achol to Hason-Fatehpur.

== Legacy ==
Ayub Ali died during his return to Bangladesh on 1 April 1980 in Hason-Fatehpur. He had two sons and a daughter. His great-nephew Tam Hussein is a journalist at ITV. Ayub Ali has a blue plaque on Sandy's Row.

== See also ==
- Aftab Ali
- I'tisam-ud-Din
