= Akke Rahman =

British-Bengali mountaineer

- আক্কে রহমান
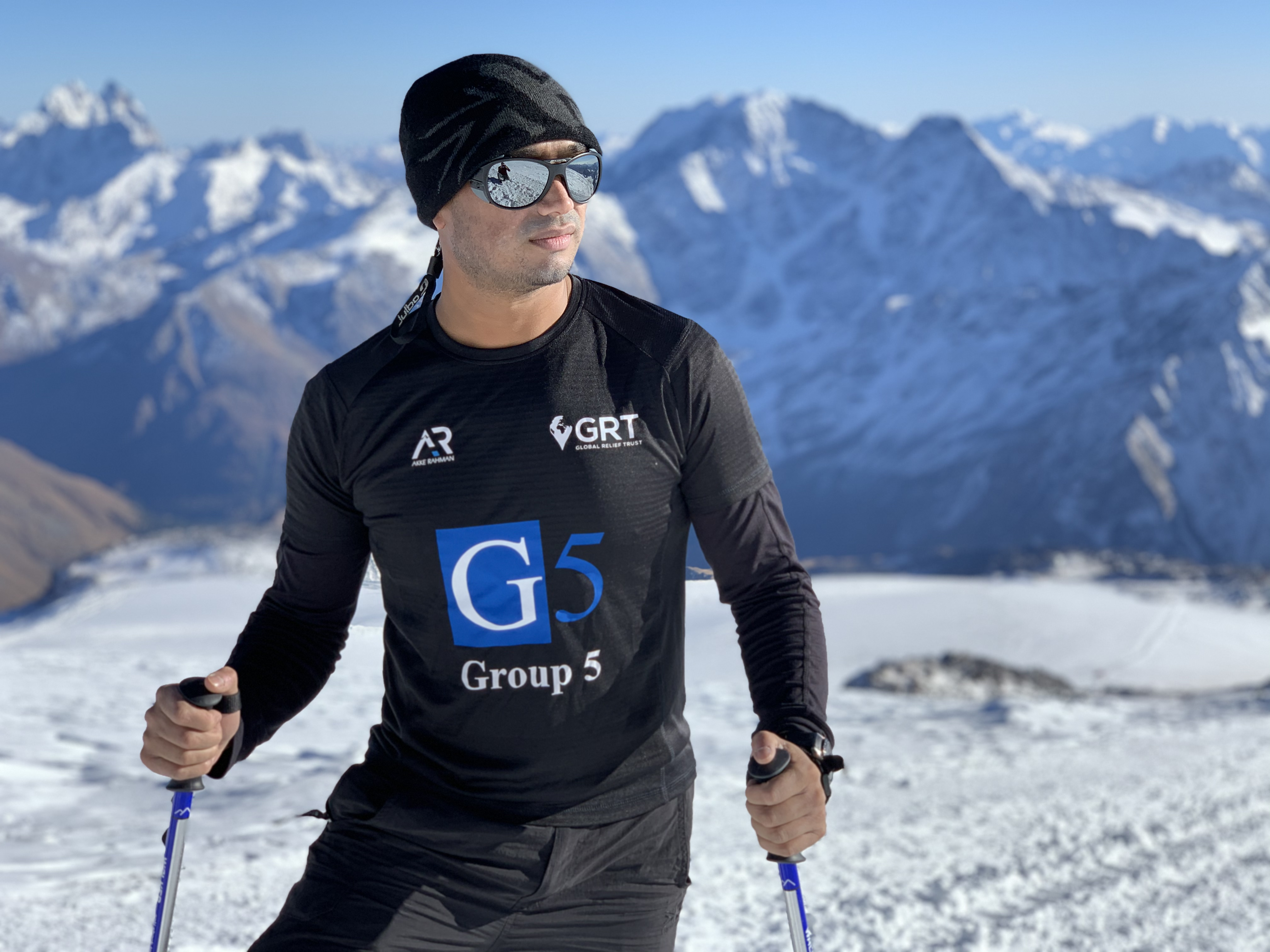
- Rahman at 4,600m on Mount Elbrus
- Born: Aklakur Rahman; October 5, 1982 (age 43); Jagannathpur, Sunamganj, Bangladesh
- Citizenship: Bangladeshi, British
- Occupation: Mountaineer
- Sports career

Climbing career
- Type of climber: Mountaineering
- Known for: Mount Everest first British muslim to summit, Mount Elbrus record holder for quickest summit.
- Website: akkerahman.com

Aklakur Rahman (Bengali: আখলাকুর রহমান), better known as Akke Rahman, is a British Bangladeshi mountaineer. In October 2020 he broke the UK record for climbing Mount Elbrus, reaching the summit in less than 24 hours. In May 2022, he became the first British Muslim to climb Mount Everest.

== Early life and education ==
Aklakur Rahman (Akke) was born on 5 October 1982 to a Bengali Muslim family in Jagannathpur, Sunamganj, Bangladesh. He has ten siblings. Akke was raised in the United Kingdom where he completed his education.

== Mountaineering career ==
In July 2020, Akke climbed Mount Kilimanjaro and Mont Blanc, raising £5,000 for Westwood High School in Oldham. He reached the top of both peaks this in under 24 hours.

In October 2020, Akke climbed Mount Elbrus without acclimatisation in less than 24 hours, five days after recovering from Coronavirus. On this ascent he raised money for the Global Relief Trust.

Akke's first attempt to climb Mount Elbrus was in September 2019. The attempt was abandoned due to dangerous weather conditions, however he still raised more than £2,500 to build wells in Bangladesh.

In May 2022, he climbed Mount Everest, becoming the first British Muslim to make the ascent and raising over $100,000 for 'Peak Humanity' charities supporting destitute families in Afghanistan, Syria and Burma. Akke went on to summit Everest again in 2024.

In July 2025, it was announced that Akke would take on his toughest challenge yet, by attempting to summit K2. His attempt was supported by car brand Dacia who align closely with adventure and the outdoors. His summit attempt was unsuccessful due to bad weather and avalanche risk.

In September 2025, Akke, once again backed by Dacia, took on Manaslu. He successfully summited in just 9 days, with no acclimatisation rotations.
