= Abdur Raees =

Bangladesh politician

- আব্দুর রইছ

Member of Parliament
- In office 1973–1979
- Preceded by: Start (gain independence)
- Succeeded by: Dewan Shamsul Abedin
- Constituency: Sylhet-3

Personal details
- Born: 7 May 1931 Jagannathpur, Assam, British India (now Bangladesh)
- Died: 18 December 1988 (aged 57)
- Party: Awami League

Abdur Raees (1 May 1931 – 18 December 1988) was a politician from Bangladesh and a member of the East Pakistan Provincial Council and the National Parliament. He was elected a member of parliament from the previous Sylhet-3 (now Sunamganj-3) seat in the 1st parliamentary election of the year 1973.

== Birth and family life ==
Abdur Rais was born on 1 May 1931, in the village of Bangaon in Patli Union of Jagannathpur, Sunamganj subdivision of the then Bengal Presidency of British India. He was married to Rafiqa Rais Chowdhury. Their children are the 1st District Council Administrator Barrister M. of Sunamganj Enamul Kabir Emon and Azizul Kabir Sahin. His wife was the deceased president of Sunamganj District Mahila Awami League. His wife was president of Sunamganj District Mahila Awami League.

== Career ==
Raees played a vital role in drafting the constitution of Bangladesh. He served as the president of the Sunamganj District bar in 1987. He actively participated in the freedom struggle.

=== Political life ===
Raees in 1969 joined the Awami League. In 1970, he was elected a member of the East Pakistan Provincial Council. He was elected a member of parliament from the previous Sylhet-3 (now Sunamganj-3) seat in the 1st parliamentary election of the year 1973. He was the president of Sunamganj district Awami League from 1973 to 1988 years. Earlier, he served as general secretary of Sunamganj district Awami League.

== Death ==
Raees died on 18 December 1988.
