= Jagannathpur Upazila =

Upazila of Bangladesh

Jagannathpur জগন্নাথপুর ꠎꠉꠘ꠆ꠘꠣꠕꠙꠥꠞ
- Upazila
- Jagannathpur Upazila
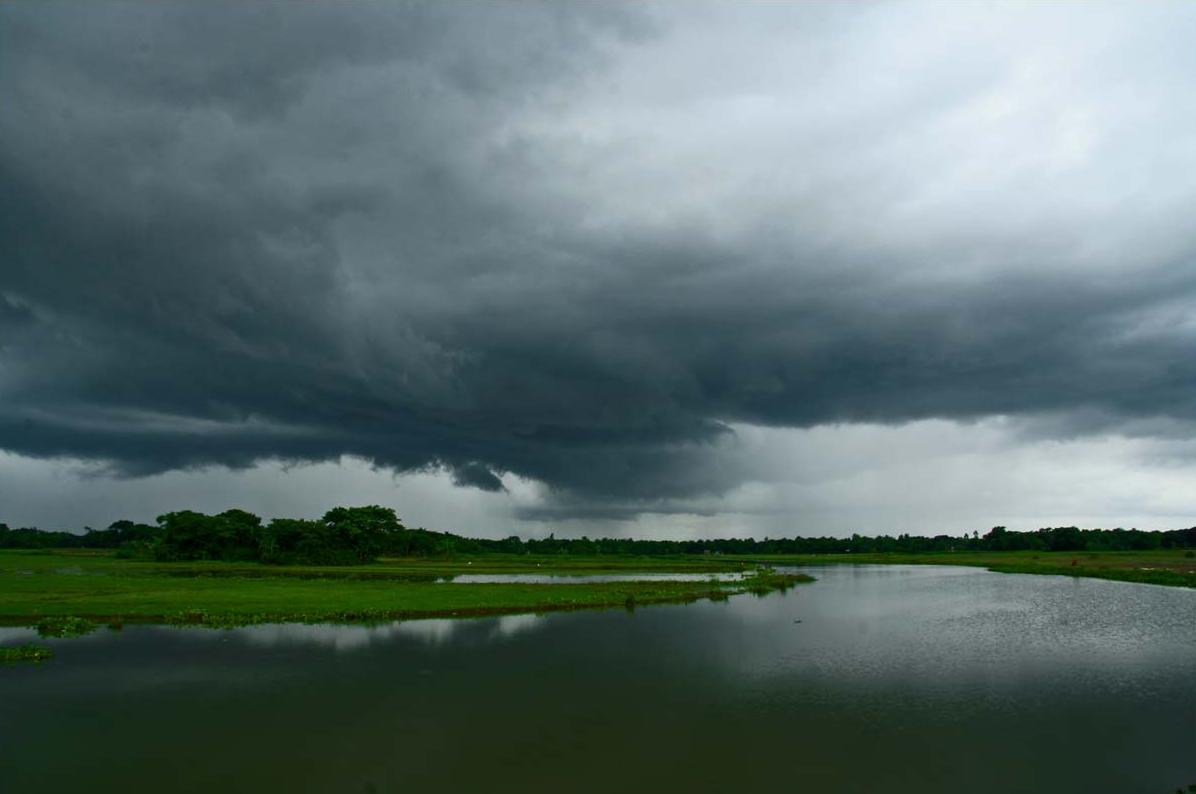
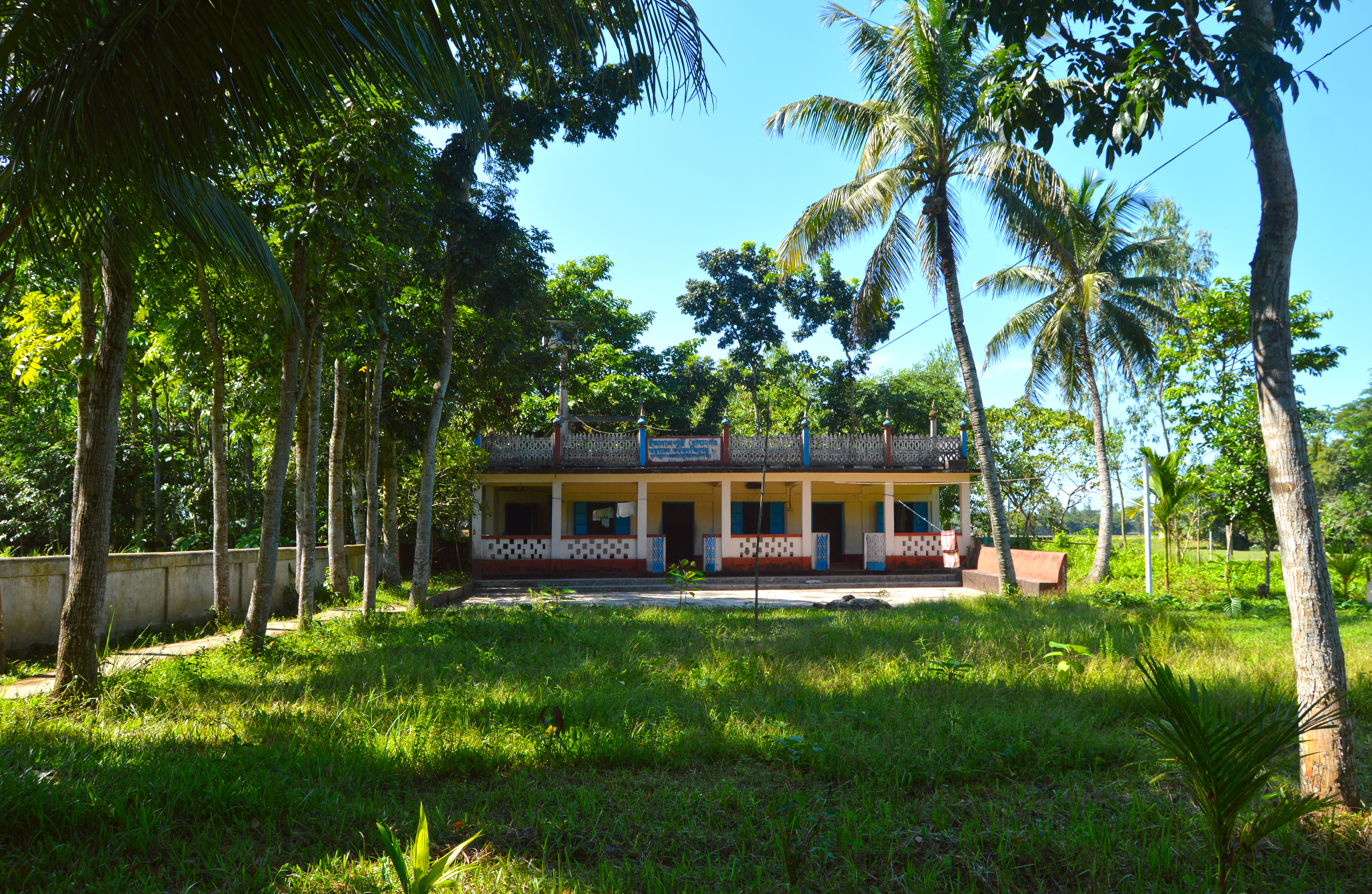
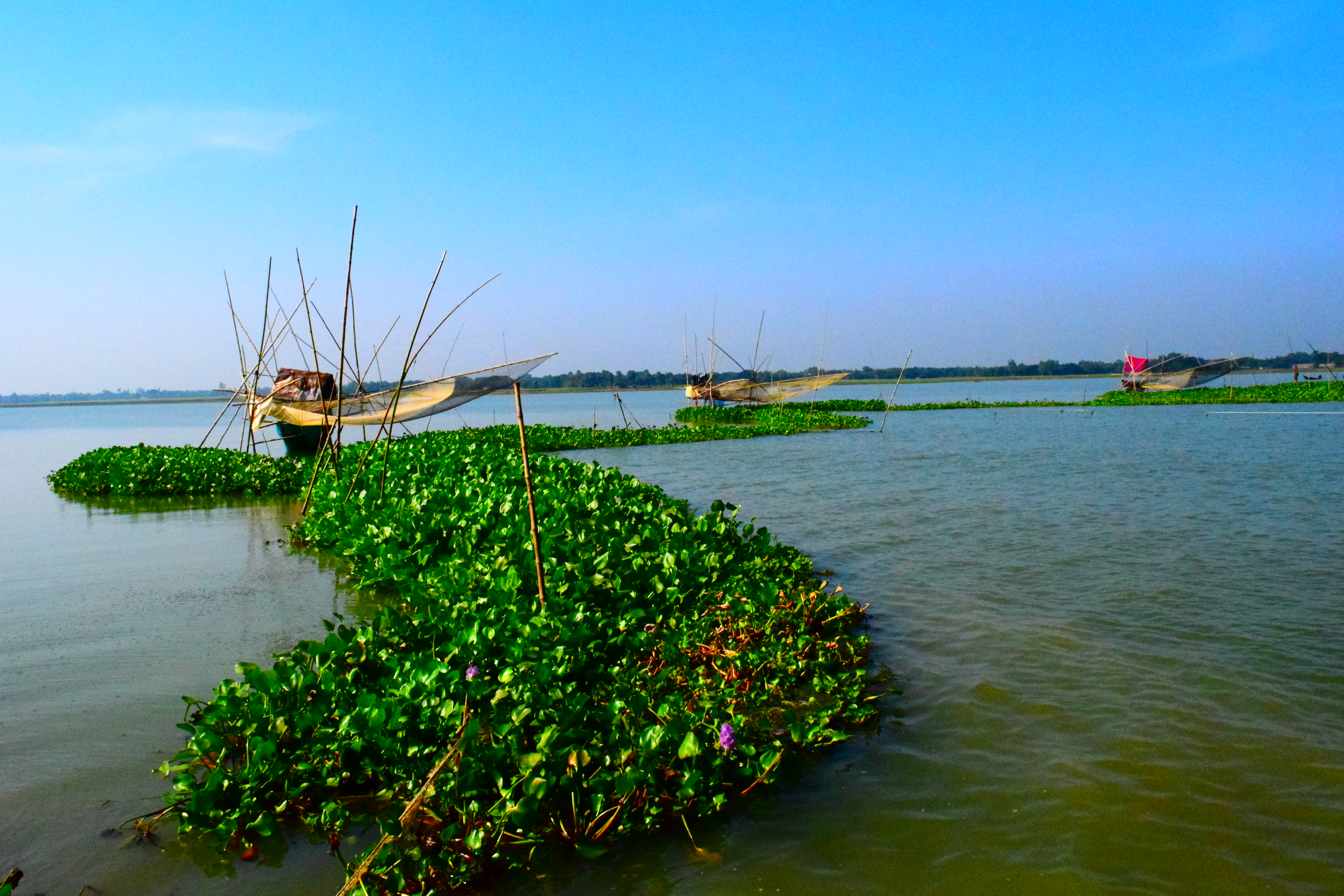
- Lake, Islampur Jame Masjid, Naluar Haor

- Country: Bangladesh
- Division: Sylhet
- District: Sunamganj
- Established: 29 September 1983

Government
  - MP (Sunamganj-3): Mohammad Koysor Ahmed (BNP)
  - Upazila chairman: Vacant (ad interim)

Area
  - Total: 368.11 km^{2} (142.13 sq mi)

Population (2022)
  - Total: 264,198
  - Density: 717.71/km^{2} (1,858.9/sq mi)
- Demonym(s): Jagannathpuri, Sylheti

Demographics
  - Literacy rate: 39.87%
- Time zone: UTC+6 (BST)
- Postal code: 3060
- Area code: 08727
- Website: jagannathpur.sunamganj.gov.bd

Jagannathpur (Bengali: জগন্নাথপুর) is an upazila located in the northeast of the district of Sunamganj and in the middle of the division of Sylhet, Bangladesh. It is bordered by Chhatak and Shantiganj to the north, Bishwanath and Osmani Nagar to the east, Derai to the west, and Nabiganj to the south.

Jagannathpur Upazila mauza geocode map

== Demographics ==
Religions in Jagannathpur Upazila (2022)
Religion	Percent
Islam	90.39%
Hinduism	9.59%
Other or not stated	0.02%

According to the 2022 Bangladeshi census, Jagannathpur Upazila had 49,192 households and a population of 264,198. 9.22% of the population were under 5 years of age. Jagannathpur had a literacy rate (age 7 and over) of 68.66%: 69.99% for males and 67.41% for females, and a sex ratio of 94.59 males for every 100 females. 57,112 (21.62%) lived in urban areas.

According to the 2011 Census of Bangladesh, Jagannathpur Upazila had 42,866 households and a population of 259,490. 71,006 (27.36%) were under 10 years of age. Jagannathpur had a literacy rate (age 7 and over) of 39.87%, compared to the national average of 51.8%, and a sex ratio of 997 females per 1000 males. 40,699 (15.68%) lived in urban areas.

At the 1991 Bangladesh census, Jagannathpur had a population of 188,139, of whom 95,285 were aged 18 or older. Males constituted 51.13% of the population, and females 48.87%. Jagannathpur had an average literacy rate of 27.9% (7+ years), against the national average of 32.4%. Of the population Muslim accounted for 81.75%, Hindu for 18.10%, Buddhist for 0.02%, Christian for 0.01%. There are 247 mosques and 5 Hindu temples in the Upazila.

At the 2001 census, it had a population of 225,271, of whom 51.7% were male and 48.3% were female, which shows the Upazila has a balanced gender ratio.

=== Immigration and migration ===
Migration process has been constant and steady in Jagannathpur Upazila and it can be characterised as a two-way traffic for centuries. People from villages have been migrating to towns and cities and especially overseas to United Kingdom (London, Birmingham, Manchester, Oldham, Scunthorpe, Leeds and Sunderland) whilst people from other parts of Bangladesh, especially from Comilla, Noakhali, Barishal, Faridpur and Mymensingh, are filling up the vacuum created by relocation of the native people. It has been identified that migration is occurring amongst people of two specific categories and they are moving out of rural to urban areas for employment and economic reasons.

Category 1 consists of people who have acquired education and seek employment. A large section of the first educated mass and elite alike have migrated to Sunamganj Municipality. Majority of the lawyers and government employees from Jagannathpur have migrated to Sunamganj town from the time of creation of Pakistan in 1947 and before the birth of Bangladesh in 1971.

Category 2 consists of well-heeled mass and elite, mainly of immigrant community and they have purchased second homes in the city of Sylhet and partially relocated in the city and abroad. The necessity of moving to city was felt in the years immediately after the independence of Bangladesh due to targeted robberies and harassing of so-called 'Londoni' families and villages during the entire decade of the 1970s. Another contributory factor was communications. Jagannathpur was isolated from both Sunamganj and Sylhet towns till the 1990s and amenities were very scarce. The second and third generations of category 1 and 2 are also migrating to the metropolis of Dhaka. The trend of migrating to Dhaka culminated with the millennium development activities from the eve of 2000 CE. As of 1986, an estimated 95 per cent of the Bangladeshi community in the UK originate from the Sylhet region, and Jagannathpur is one of the upazilas in Sylhet which has the highest number of expatriates in the UK. They mainly settled in towns and cities such as St Albans (Hertfordshire), London, in particular Tower Hamlets, people from Jagannathpur can be found in the Brick Lane area (Spitalfields and Banglatown), Newham and Redbridge and Birmingham, Oldham, Leeds, Northampton, Bedford Kidderminster, Haslingden and Sunderland. A wave of immigration from Jagannathpur began after the post war shortages of industrial labour in England. This was combined with a further a sudden industrial boom of the cotton industry, mainly young men were given the opportunity to immigrate to the UK and work in the cotton mills. Migration took place for various reason such as for a better quality of life or wealth, escape poverty, and send money back home for financial support. Many people of Jagannathpur had previously resided in the villages, and agricultural business was a major occupation as many farmers owned a vast amount of rich paddy fields and estates.

Due to immigration, there has been a large shift in the demographics and statistics of Jaganathpur, and also the entire region of Sylhet. The second generation settlers live in the UK and regard it as their home. Despite the cultural barriers and the perceived isolation there has been a paramount of success breeding from the people of Jaganathpur and other parts of Sylhet. They have overcome institutionalised racism, language barriers, social barriers and religious barriers to produce a successful and highly educated young population. Most of whom are now entrepreneurs, doctors, lawyers, diplomats, politicians, biomedical scientists and other professionals. A fair number of people from Jaganathpur have found success and fame through the catering industry and are very successful restaurateurs throughout the country, although the industry is known as Indian, the majority are in fact Bangladeshi origin and essence, as over 85 per cent of Indian restaurants in the UK are owned and managed by Bangladeshi Sylhetis.

Shah Abdul Majid Qureshi who was a pioneer in the curry industry was from Jagannathpur, including Anwar Choudhury – the first and, as of 2004, only Bangladeshi-born and Bangladeshi ethnic British High Commissioner to Bangladesh, Cllr Ghulam Murtuza – the first Bangladeshi born Mayor in the London Borough of Tower Hamlets, and Ahmed Fakhruddin – late veteran community activist was also from Jagannathpur. Haji Abdul Motin aka Motin Miah, a non-resident British Bangladeshi organizer of Bangladesh independent war in 1971 at manchester, and Alhajj Mohammed Gulzar Hussain, a non-resident British Bangladeshi organizer of Bangladesh independent war in 1971 at St. Albans, UK were also from Jagannathpur. The first person from Syedpur to be elected to both council seats was Cllr Syed Mumshad Ahmed, son of Alhajj Syed Mostaque Ahmed (Kidderminster, Wyre forest district councillor 2008 and Worcestershire county councillor 2009).

== Administration ==
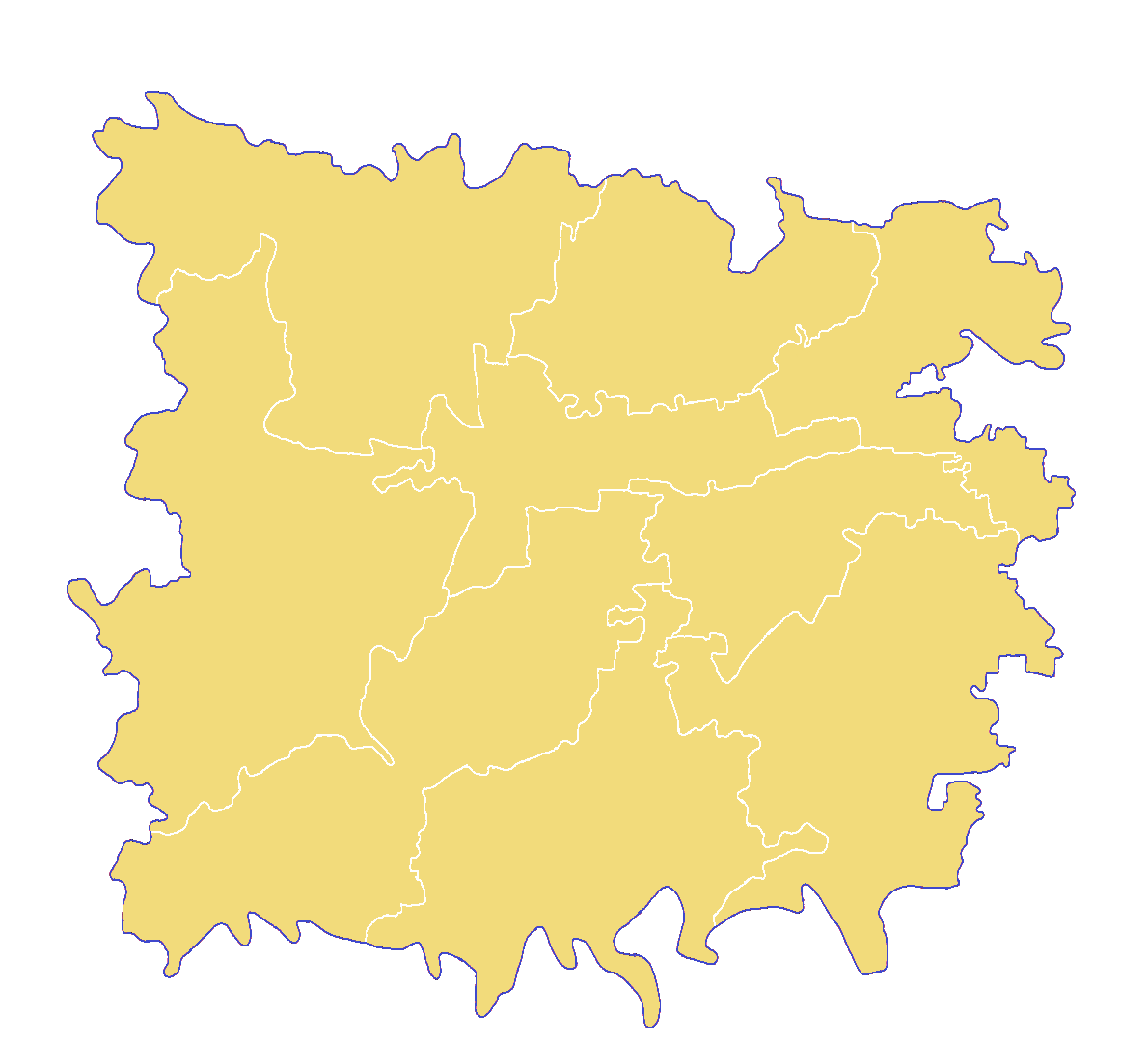
Map of Jagannathpur Upazila

A separate Thana was established at Jagannathpur on 1 October 1920 by a gazette notification by Anamul Haque of Parargaon; the thana was upgraded first as an Upazila in 1983, and then as a municipality on the 29 September 1999.

Jagannathpur Upazila is divided into Jagannathpur Municipality and eight union parishads: Asharkandi, Chilaura Holdipur, Kalkalia, Mirpur, Pailgaon, Patli, Raniganj, and Syedpur Shaharpara. The union parishads are subdivided into 225 mauzas and 310 villages.

Jagannathpur Municipality is subdivided into 9 wards and 43 mahallas.

=== Municipality ===
The Upazila Municipality consists of 9 wards:

- Ward 1: Ishaqpur, Bhagyanarayanpur, Bhobanipur, Shashanhabi.
- Ward 2: Oihargai, Oiharshahi, Inayetnagar, Pushka Rakhyapur, Ludorpur
- Ward 3: Borotpur, Srirampur, Rampur, Salehpur
- Ward 4: Habibpur, Shahpur, Kishorepur, Majhpara, Durlavpur, Ashighar
- Ward 5: Bagzor, Bari Jagannathpur, Hariharpur, Uttar Srinidhipur
- Ward 6: Jagannathpur, Karimpur, Badaura, Hashimabad, Aliyabad
- Ward 7: Ikorochhoi, Monimpur
- Ward 8: Paruya, Purbo Bhobanipur
- Ward 9: Sherpur, Jatrapasha, Paschim Bhobanipur

There are approximately 35,682 households present in Jagannathpur.

== Education ==
There are 6 colleges, 15 high schools (2 junior), up to 119 primary schools under government control, 21 private schools and 34 madrasahs. Notable educational institutions are: Swarup Chandra Government High School, Safat Ullah High School, Shahjalal College and Jagannathpur College.The literacy rate as per 2001 census was 45.3%, which was the highest in Sunamganj, and one of the highest in Sylhet.

== Notable people ==
- Abdur Raees (1931–1988), former Member of Parliament in Pakistan and Bangladesh
- Abdus Samad Azad (1922–2005), former Member of the Bangladesh Parliament and Minister of Foreign Affairs
- Abdul Hannan Chowdhury (1920–2000), First law secretary
- Akke Rahman (born 1982), British Bangladeshi mountaineer
- Alaur Rahman (born 1961), British Bangladeshi Singer
- Anwar Choudhury (born 1959), former Governor of the Cayman Islands, United Kingdom Ambassador to Peru and High Commissioner of the UK to Bangladesh
- Apsana Begum (born 1990), Member of the British Parliament for Poplar and Limehouse
- Asaddor Ali (1929–2005), writer, researcher and historian
- Ayub Ali Master (1880–1980), social reformer in Britain
- Brajendra Narayan Chowdhury (1882–1972), landlord, politician and social worker
- Hazrat Shah Kamal Quhafah (1291–1385 CE), Islamic preacher
- Luthfur Rahman (born 1976), deputy leader of Manchester, England
- Mohammad Koysor Ahmed (born 1974), politician, Member of the Bangladesh Parliament
- Radharaman Dutta (1833–1915), composer and lyricist
- Syed Shahnur (1730–1854), poet and writer
- Shah Abdul Majid Qureshi (1915–2003), social reformer in Britain
- Suhasini Das (1915–2009), activist, social worker and politician
- Syeda Shahar Banu (1914–1983), Bengali-language activist
- Shahinur Pasha Chowdhury (born 1969), politician, former Member of the Bangladesh Parliament

== See also ==
- Islampur
- Shaharpara
- Sreedharpasha
