= Mirpur Union =

Mirpur Union মিরপুর ইউনিয়ন
- Union Council
- No. 3 Mirpur Union Council
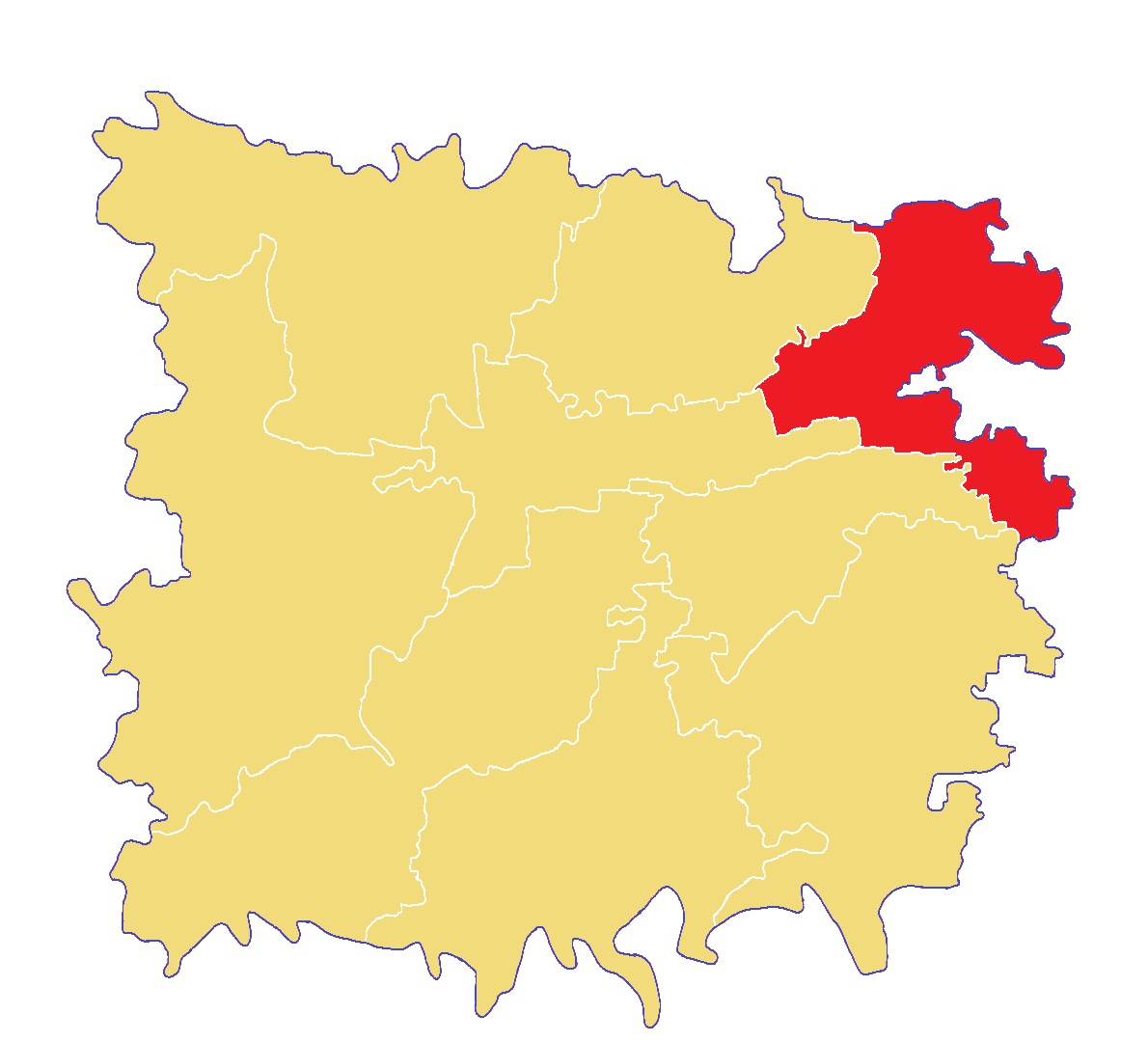

- Location in Bangladesh
- Country: Bangladesh
- Division: Sylhet Division
- District: Sunamganj District
- Upazila: Jagannathpur Upazila

Population
  - Total: 20,358
- Demonym(s): Mirpuri, Jagannathpuri, Sylheti
- Website: https://www.mirpurup.sunamganj.gov.bd

Mirpur Union (Bengali: মিরপুর ইউনিয়ন) is a Union Parishad under Jagannathpur Upazila of Sunamganj District in the division of Sylhet, Bangladesh. It has an area of 28.903 square kilometres and a population of 20358.

== Geography ==
Mirpur Union is located at the northeast of Jagannathpur Upazila. It shares borders with Bishwanath Upazila in the east, Patli Union and Jagannathpur municipality in the west, Chhatak Upazila in the north, and Syedpur Shaharpara Union in the south. It has an area of 28.903 square kilometres.

== Demography ==
Mirpur has a population of 17,647.

== Administration ==
Mirpur constitutes the no. 3 union council of Jagannathpur Upazila.

== Economy ==
Mirpur has a significant number of British and American immigrants.

== Education ==
Name of School	Type	Education Level	Location
Mirpur Public High School	School	Secondary (SSC)	Mirpur Bazar
Mirpur Government Primary School	School	Primary	Mirpur Bazar
Holiar Para Madrasa	Madrasah	Primary and Secondary	Holiar Para
Borokapon and Adhua Imdadul Uloom Madrasa	Madrasah	Primary and Secondary	Borokapon
Sreeramsee High School and College	School	Secondary and College	Sreeramsee

Mirpur United Technical College, Shah Market
