= Shah Abdul Majid Qureshi =

British Bangladeshi restaurateur and social reformer (1915 - 2003)

Haji Shah Abdul Majid Qureshi
- আবদুল মজিদ কোরেশী
- Born: 25 September 1915; Jagannathpur, Assam Province, British India
- Died: 2003 (aged 87–88); United Kingdom
- Citizenship: United Kingdom, Bangladesh
- Occupations: Businessman, social worker
- Organization: Indian Seamen's Welfare League
- Known for: One of the early founders of the British Bangladeshi community
- Family: Qureshis of Patli

Shah Abdul Majid Qureshi (Bengali: শাহ আবদুল মজিদ কোরেশী), also known by his daak naam Moina Miah (Bengali: ময়না মিঞা), was an early British Bangladeshi restaurateur and social reformer. He is notable for being involved in the early politics of British Asians and pioneering social welfare work for the working-class diaspora in the United Kingdom. He claimed to be the first Sylheti to own a restaurant in the United Kingdom. One of his later restaurants, India Centre, often provided facilities and was a location where important meetings were held by the India League attracting the likes of Subhas Chandra Bose and V. K. Krishna Menon.

== Early life ==
Qureshi came from a traditional Bengali Muslim family. He was born in the Patli village of Jagannathpur in the Sylhet District of British India's Assam Province on 25 September 1915. He was the eldest child and had two brothers and a sister. The family residence in Patli was known as Quresh Bari and his father owned some land. However, his father's main goal was to educate his children which was extremely expensive, leading to him selling nearly all his land. This led to Qureshi being well educated during his youth.

Qureshi decided to become a lascar after being inspired by many other Sylheti men and moved to Calcutta in 1934. He believed that seafaring was a historical inheritance of Sylhetis due to many Sylhetis being descendants of foreign traders and businessmen. He joined the crew of a ship bound for the United States. His intention was to jump ship in New York City, where he believed he would find economic opportunity, but his attempt was foiled in 1935. The next year, in his early 20s, he successfully jumped ship in London.

== Career ==
Qureshi's first job in the United Kingdom consisted of selling chocolates. After getting into contact with other British Asians, he began working in South Asian cuisine restaurants such as Bengal Restaurant in Percy Street. After two years of living in the United Kingdom, Qureshi opened his first restaurant, Dilkush, which was located in Soho's Great Windmill Street. He claimed this was the first restaurant to be owned by a Sylheti. The restaurant, located near Tottenham Court Road, was destroyed by a bomb in 1940.

In 1943, Qureshi, alongside his acquaintance Ayub Ali Master, founded the Indian Seamen's Welfare League with a purpose of promoting the social welfare of lascars. Based in Christian Street, the organisation ensured the rights of Asians and made it easier for them to communicate to their family abroad. On 14 July 1943, the first meeting took place, in King's Hall, Commercial Street, London. The meeting attracted mostly Bengali Muslims but dozens of Europeans were also present. Later, the organisation was renamed to the Indian Seamen's Welfare League to sound less political and Qureshi was made president of the welfare league.

The following year, Qureshi opened another restaurant off Charlotte Street which came to be known as the India Centre. The India Centre was frequently visited by British Asians, in particular politicians, who held important communal and political meetings there. Qureshi also assisted and attended V. K. Krishna Menon's India League and Surat Alley's Hindustani Social Club meetings. He was also involved with the Indian National Congress and was in contact with the likes of Subhas Chandra Bose. Later on, he became a member of the All-India Muslim League.

In 1946, Qureshi returned for the first time to Sylhet, where he married. He divided his time between London and Sylhet until 1976, when his wife and children joined him in the United Kingdom.

== Legacy ==
His sons continue to own Indian cuisine restaurants in the United Kingdom.

== See also ==
- Aftab Ali
- I'tisam-ud-Din
