= Luthfur Rahman =

British former local councillor (born 1976)

Luthfur Rahman OBE
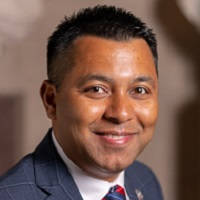

Deputy Leader of Manchester City Council
- In office 2020 – 2 May 2024
- Leader: Richard Leese; Bev Craig
- Preceded by: Sue Murphy
- Succeeded by: Garry Bridges

Member of Manchester City Council for Longsight
- In office 1 May 2008 – 2 May 2024
- Preceded by: Liaqat Ali
- Succeeded by: Shahbaz Sarwar

Personal details
- Born: October 1976 (age 49–50) Patli, Jagannathpur, Sunamganj, Bangladesh
- Citizenship: British
- Party: Labour

Luthfur Rahman (Bengali: লুথফুর রহমান; born October 1976) is a British former local councillor, who served as the deputy leader of Manchester City Council from 2021 to 2024. In May 2008, he became the first person of Bangladeshi origin to be elected to Manchester City Council.

== Early life ==
Luthfur Rahman was born into a Bengali Muslim family from Shathal in Patli, Jagannathpur in the Sunamganj District of Bangladesh.

Migrating to Longsight in Manchester as a child in 1980, Luthfur Rahman attended St Agnes Primary School and Burnage High School.

== Career ==
Luthfur Rahman was first elected to Manchester City Council in 2008, taking the seat from the Liberal Democrats with a swing of over 30 percent gaining a majority of 1147. In 2010, Rahman was elected by fellow councillors to be the Executive Member for the Race and Equality portfolio at Manchester City Council. He was re-elected in 2012, doubling his majority, increased his percentage of the vote again in 2016, and retained the Longsight seat in 2018 and 2021 on new ward boundaries. Rahman progressed to hold the titles of Executive Member for Skills, Culture and Leisure, and then deputy leader of the council. He was also speculated to be a possible successor as leader of the council on the retirement of Richard Leese in 2021.

In the 2024 Manchester City Council election, Rahman lost his Longsight ward seat to Shahbaz Sarwar of the Workers Party of Britain (WPB) by 184 votes. The surge in support for the WPB has been attributed to the national position of the Labour Party on the Gaza war.

== Recognition ==
In 2011, Luthfur Rahman was awarded the Community Champion of the Year at the Local Government Information Unit Councillor Awards. The Local Government Information Unit described Luthfur Rahman as having:

"successfully developed links with marginalized groups across Manchester, and, furthermore, was at the forefront of an effort to bridge the various gaps between different generations. Importantly, after establishing these new connections, Cllr Rahman effectively used these channels to ensure that council decisions were sensitive to the different interests of different sections of the community."

Arts Council England said of Luthfur Rahman in 2020:

"He was integral in the making of the The[sic] Festival of Manchester and helped Manchester achieve the UNESCO City of Literature status."

He was appointed Officer of the Order of the British Empire (OBE) in the 2020 Birthday Honours for services to local government.

== See also ==
- British Bangladeshis
- List of British Bangladeshis
- List of ethnic minority British politicians
