= Albert Mahomet =

Signed photo of Albert Mahomet

Albert John Mahomet (29 April 1858 – 6 August 1933) was a British photographer, teacher, and Methodist preacher.

Born to a lascar seaman father from India and English mother, He has been described as possibly the first British Indian photographer. Mahomet left documentation of his life and of the life of the poor in London's East End in his book From Street Arab to Pastor.

== Early life ==
Mahomet was born in Limehouse, East London, and grew up in poverty for much of his childhood. After being abandoned by his father (who had died while on a ship returning to India), his family fell into yet deeper poverty. His mother took to drink and was arrested for brawling in the street. Subsequently, he was placed in the Limehouse Workhouse, but was later sent to Norfolk and then Thursford Union Workhouse. Under the Poor Law, the authorities of the child's mother’s place of origin were responsible for them.

Mahomet was eventually saved from the workhouse by his uncle, William Jenkerson, and taken to live in Wells. In Wells he worked first as a domestic servant then for a doctor who later dismissed him for trading in the surgery. He then worked for a farmer called Samuel Gooch. Gooch was Superintendent of the Wesleyan Sunday school. It may be that Gooch’s influence contributed to the changing course of Albert’s life in the following years.

== Becoming a pastor and photography work ==
As a young man, Mahomet moved to Lincoln, where he worked for a blacksmith, as well as a Methodist Sunday school teacher, a lay preacher and a temperance campaigner. He went on to tour the country as a preacher, and it was during this period that he met a fellow-evangelist Christian, Paulina Gill, whom he married in December 1881.

In around 1890, Mahomet returned to Norfolk and spent about three years acting as pastor to the Yarmouth fishing community. In 1893 he and his wife, Paulina, moved back to Wells, where he continued to preach, but where he became interested in photography. He opened a studio in Wells on Freeman Street and possibly several other places. His output included both portraits and local scenes. His memoir was written in the early part of his time in Wells, but he did not write of his photography work.

In later life, Mahomet moved to Leeds where he opened another studio in 1906.
