= Patli Union =

Patli Union Parishad পাটলী ইউনিয়ন
- Union Council
- No. 7 Patli Union Council
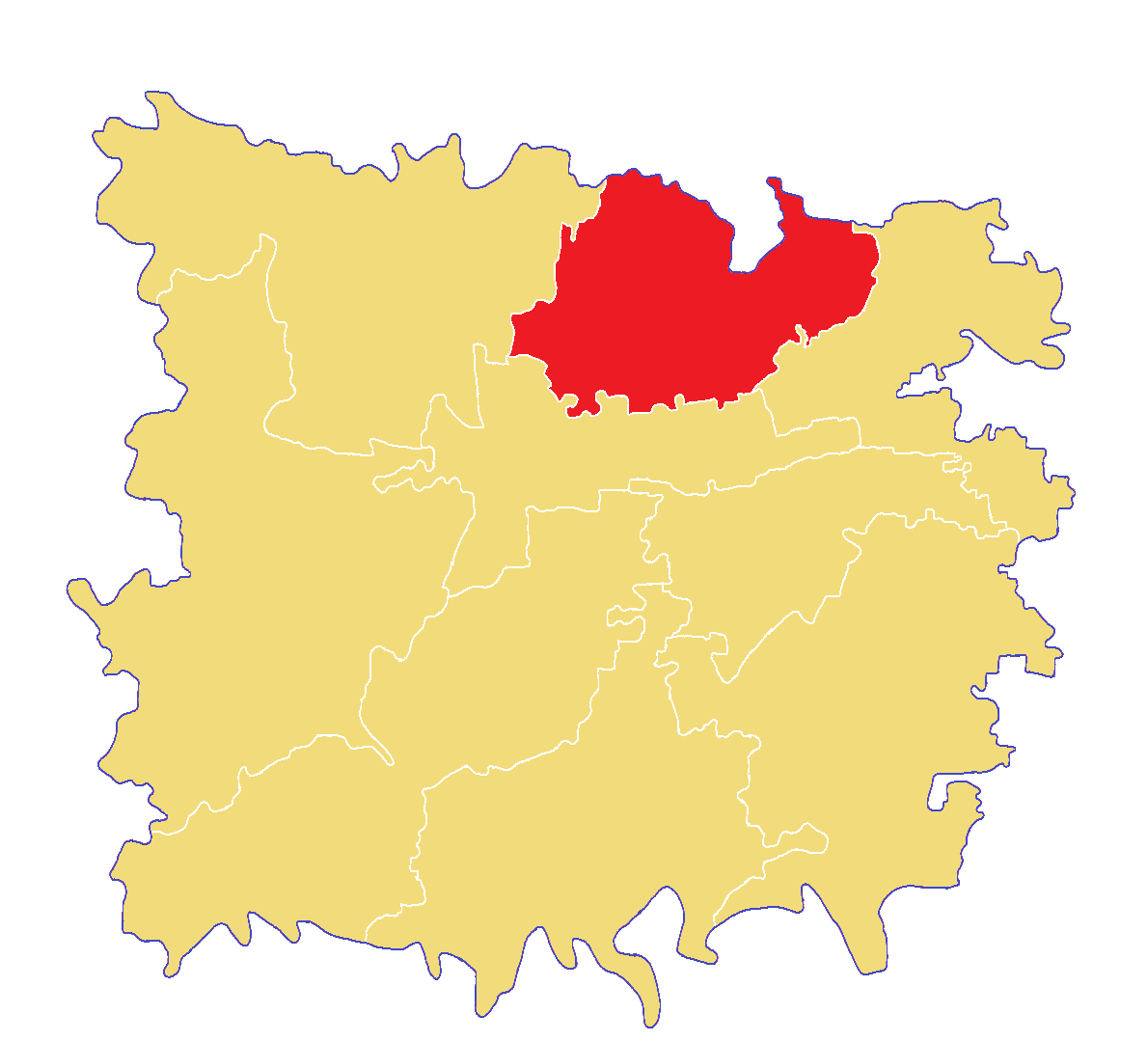

- Location in Bangladesh
- Coordinates: 24.7948°N 91.5861°E
- Country: Bangladesh
- Division: Sylhet Division
- District: Sunamganj District
- Upazila: Jagannathpur Upazila

Population (2001)
  - Total: 21,383
- Demonym: Patli-wala
- Time zone: UTC+6 (BST)
- Website: patliup.sunamganj.gov.bd

Patli Union Parishad (Bengali: পাটলী ইউনিয়ন পরিষদ) is a union parishad under Jagannathpur Upazila of Sunamganj District in the division of Sylhet, Bangladesh. It has an area of 32.52 square kilometres and a population of 21,383.

== Geography ==
Patli Union shares borders with the Kolkolia Union in the west, Mirpur Union in the east, Bhatgaon, Chhatak in the north, and Jagannathpur Pourashava in the south. It has an area of 32.52 square kilometres.

== History ==
The union is named after the village of Patli in the Union. The village was originally known as Pathtuli (পাঠটুলি). The word ‘Path’ (পাঠ) means education or learning, while ‘Tuli’ (টুলি) means a house or dwelling. At the dawn of the modern era, a school was established on Aurangabad Field (অরঙ্গাবাদ মাঠ) on the eastern bank of the River Bhoogarbha (ভূগর্ভ নদী). The school came to be known as Pathtuli, and in time the surrounding settlement inherited the same name. Over the centuries, the name was gradually simplified, eventually evolving into the form by which the village is known today - Patli (পাটলী). As the compound Path (পাঠ) means “study” or “reading” and Tuli (টুলি) literally means “the house of education” or “a school”, the name of the village itself signifies a place of learning. There was a time when its Rusulganj Bazar was nicknamed the soul centre (প্রাণ কেন্দ্র) of Sunamganj.

== Administration ==
The union parishad has 9 wards, 29 mouzas and 50 villages.

1. Ward 1: Rameshwarpur, Lautola, Bongaon, Noorbala, Radhuni Kona, Rasulpur
2. Ward 2: Hamidpur, Araliya Bazaar, Prabhakarpur
3. Ward 3: Shashon, Islampur, Nondirgaon, Alipur, Shachayani
4. Ward 4: Chok Qasimpur, Asshampur, Noagaon, Sonapur, Kabirpur
5. Ward 5: East Faridpur, Minajpur, Sulemanpur, Ekaboro, Shatal, Chandpur, Eka Lodi
6. Ward 6: Jongolgaon, Patli-Makrampur, Mugurjana, Patli, Fatehpur
7. Ward 7: Deegharkool, Bilchar, Darikhunjanpur, Shamspur, Rasulganj Bazar, Patli Chok
8. Ward 8: Goalkuri, Kaminipur, Shahmat
9. Ward 9: Lohargaon, Khetropasha, Shikorpur Bade, Muhammadpur Shera, Koriain, Dhonjoypur

== Education ==
Patli Union Parishad has

- 18 Govt. Primary school
- 3 Middle schools
- 1 Women College
- 2 dakhil madrasas
- 2 alim madrasas
- 1 Qawmi madrasa

HEALTH CENTRE

RDF MATERNITY CARE

== Language and culture ==
The native population converse in their native Sylheti dialect but can also converse in Standard Bengali. Languages such as Arabic and English are also taught in schools. The union has 44 masjids.

== Notable people ==
- Abdur Raees of Patli Bangaon (1931–1988), former Member of Parliament in Pakistan and Bangladesh
- Anwar Choudhury of Patli Prabhakarpur (born 1959), former Governor of the Cayman Islands and High Commissioner of the UK to Bangladesh
- Luthfur Rahman of Patli Shatal (born 1976), deputy leader of Manchester, England
- Shah Abdul Majid Qureshi of Patli Qureshibari (1915–2003), social reformer and political activist in British India and Britain
