= Kalkalia Union =

Kalkalia কলকলিয়া
- Union Council
- 1 No. Kalkalia Union Parishad
- Location in Bangladesh
- Coordinates: 24.8288°N 91.5125°E
- Country: Bangladesh
- Division: Sylhet
- District: Sunamganj
- Upazila: Jagannathpur

Government
  - Chairman: Alhaj Md. Rofique Mia (Independent)
  - Secretary: Md. Masum Billah

Area
  - Total: 21 km^{2} (8.1 sq mi)

Population (2018)
  - Total: 26,057
- Demonym(s): Jagannathpuri, Sylheti
- Time zone: UTC+6 (BST)
- Postal code: 3060
- Area code: 8727
- Website: kolkoliaup.sunamganj.gov.bd

Kalkalia Union (Bengali: কলকলিয়া ইউনিয়ন) is a union parishad under Jagannathpur Upazila of Sunamganj District in the division of Sylhet, Bangladesh. The name Kalkalia is a variant of Kalkali, which was originally named after Shah Kalkali. It has an area of 21 square kilometres and a population of 26,057.

== Geography ==
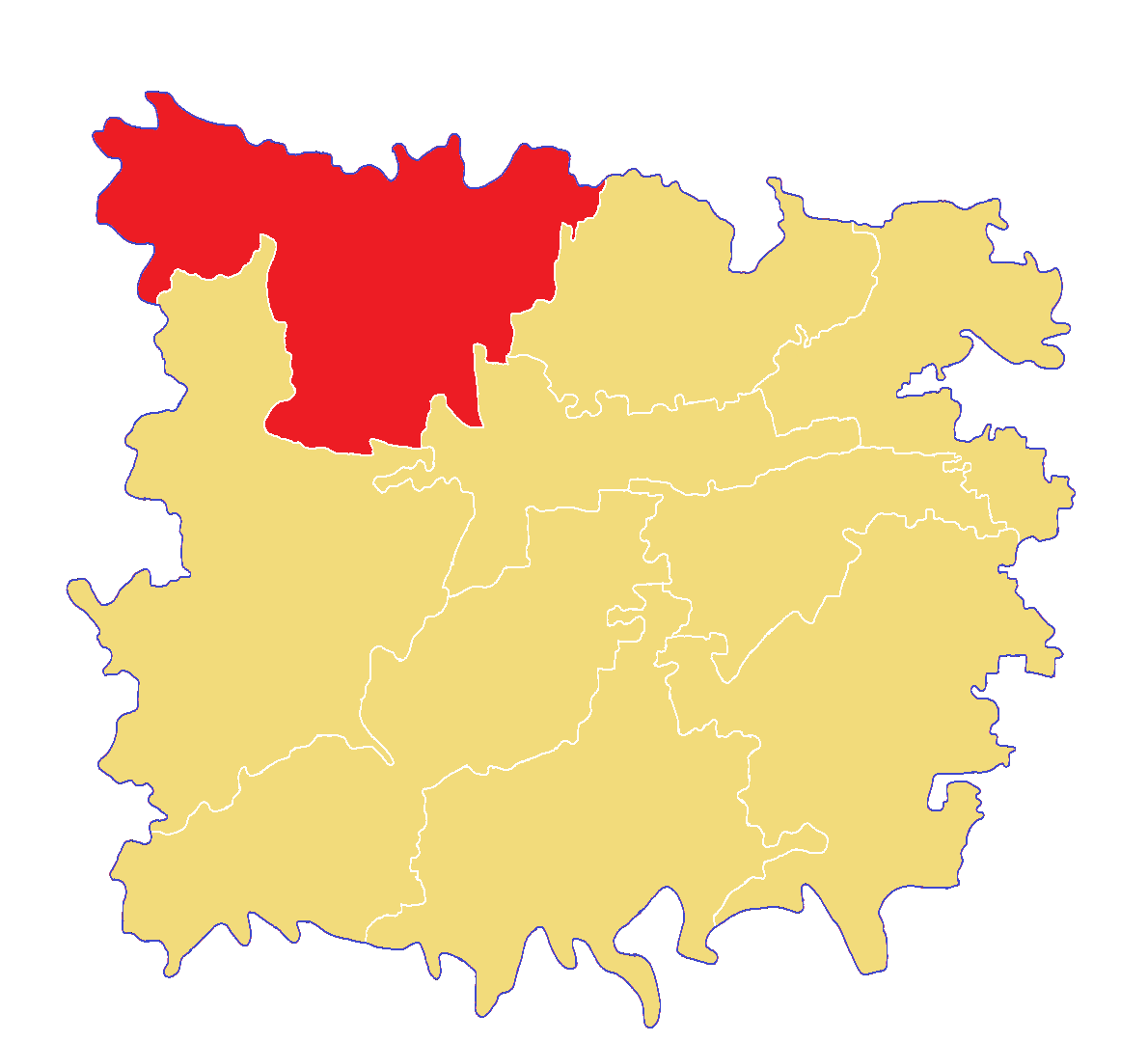
Map of Kalkalia Union

Kalkalia Union is located at the north-west of Jagannathpur Upazila. It shares borders with Patli Union and Jagannathpur Municipality in the East, Derai Upazila in the west, Shantiganj Upazila and Chhatak Upazila in the north and Chilaura Haldipur Union in the south. It has an area of 21 square kilometres.

== Demography ==
Kolkolia Union has a population of 38,000.

== Administration ==
Kalkalia Union constitutes the no.1 union council of Jagannathpur Upazila. It has 9 wards, 34 mauzas, and 39 villages.
