= List of educational institutions in Sylhet District =

This is a list of educational institutions in Sylhet District, Bangladesh. The list excludes some lesser educational institutions.

== Universities ==
University	Location	Upazila	Management	Est.
Leading University	Kamal Bazar	Dakshin Surma	Private	2001
Metropolitan University, Sylhet	Bateshwar	Sylhet Sadar	Private	2003
North East University	Telihaor (temporary)	Sylhet Sadar	Private	2012
R.T.M. Al-Kabir Technical University	TB Gate (temporary)	Sylhet Sadar	Private	2020
Shahjalal University of Science and Technology	Kumargaon	Sylhet Sadar	Public	1986
Sylhet Agricultural University	Tilagor	Sylhet Sadar	Public	2006
Sylhet International University	Shamimabad	Sylhet Sadar	Private	2001

=== Medical universities ===
The only medical university in the district is the public Sylhet Medical University (formerly Bangamata Sheikh Fazilatunessa Mujib Medical University), established in 2018. Its temporary campus is in Chowhatta, Sylhet.

== Colleges ==
=== Law colleges ===
The only college of law in the district is the private Sylhet Law College, on Shah Jalal Bridge Road, Sylhet.

=== Medical colleges ===
College	Location	Upazila	Management	Est.
Jalalabad Ragib-Rabeya Medical College	Pathantula	Sylhet Sadar	Private	
North East Medical College		Dakshin Surma	Private	
Parkview Medical College	Taltola	Sylhet Sadar	Private	
Sylhet MAG Osmani Medical College		Sylhet Sadar	Public	
Sylhet Women's Medical College	Mirboxtula	Sylhet Sadar	Private	

=== Dental colleges ===
The only dental college in the district is the private Sylhet Central Dental College, in Shahjalal Uposhohor, Sylhet.

=== Nursing colleges ===
Each of the five medical colleges has an associated nursing college recognized by the Bangladesh Nursing and Midwifery Council. Four other private nursing colleges are also recognized by the council.

- Al-Amin Nursing College, Shahjalal Uposhohor, Sylhet
- RTMI Nursing College, Tilagor, Sylhet
- Surma Nursing College, Akhalia, Sylhet
- Sylhet Red Crescent Nursing College, Sylhet

=== Homeopathic colleges ===
Jalalabad Homeopathic Medical College is the only homeopathic college in the district recognized by the Bangladesh Homeopathic Board. It is located on Mirjajangal Road, Sylhet.

=== Unani/ayurvedic colleges ===
There are two Unani/ayurvedic colleges in the district. Government Unani & Ayurvedic Medical College in Shahjalal Uposhohor, Sylhet, is public. Srihatta Sanskrit College on Police Line Road, Sylhet, is private. It was established in 1920.

=== Masters level colleges ===
- Madan Mohan College
- Murari Chand College

=== Degree colleges (honors) ===
- Dakshin Surma College
- Dhakadakshin Government College
- Sylhet Government Women's College

=== Degree colleges (pass) ===
- Beanibazar Adarsha Mohila College
- Biswanath Degree College
- Dhakadakshin Government College
- Fenchuganj Degree College
- Moinuddin Adarsha Mohila College
- Nari Sikkha Academy Degree College
- Shah Khurrom Degree College
- Sylhet Government College
- Tajpur Degree College

=== Colleges ===
- Army Institute of Business Administration, Sylhet
- Sylhet Engineering College

=== Medical institutes ===
- Govt. Institute of Health Technology, Sylhet
- North East Institute of Health Technology, Sylhet

=== Technical colleges ===
- British Engineering College (BEC)
- Impt Medical Technology College
- Islami Bank Institute of Technology
- Sylhet Polytechnic Institute
- Sylhet Professional Technical Institute (SPTI)

== High schools and intermediate colleges ==
=== National curriculum ===
- Atharia School and College
- Blue Bird High School and College
- Border Guard Public School & College, Akhalia
- Dhakadakshin Multilateral High School and College
- Government Mohammad Chowdhury Academy Model School and College
- Hazrat Shahjalal (RH) College
- Jalalabad Cantonment English School and College
- Jalalabad Cantonment Public School & College
- Jalalabad University College
- Kawsarabad College
- Kurar Bazar College
- Scholarshome
- Shahjalal Jamia Islamia School & College
- Shahjalal University School And College
- Starlight College, South Surma
- State College, Housing Estate
- Sylhet Cantonment Public School and College
- Sylhet Central College
- Sylhet Commerce College
- Sylhet Govt. Commercial Institute
- Sylhet Govt. Model School & College
- Sylhet Science And Technology College
- Sylhet Science College
- Pathantula BL High School
- Ram Sundar Pilot High School

=== British curriculum ===
- RISE (Royal Institute of Smart Education)
- Little Jewels International School
- Greenwood International School
- Imperial International School and College
- Metropolitan School Sylhet
- Scholastica Sylhet
- Anandaniketan
- Banyan British School
- British Bangladesh International School & College
- Cambridge Grammar School & College
- Kawsarabad International School
- Oxford International School & College, Sylhet
- Presidency School & College
- Stemays School
- Sunny Hill International School
- Sylhet Grammar School
- Sylhet International School & College
- The Sylhet Khajanchibari International School & College

== Madrasas ==
- Alapur Girls Madrasa Kaligonj Bazaar
- Atapur Madrasa
- Badedwral Fultoli Kamil Madrasha
- Beanibazar Senior Madrasha
- Boiragi Bazar Madrasa
- Boraya Uttorbag Alia Madrasha, Sreerampur
- Boroikandi Islamia Fazill Madrasha
- Fayize Jalil Atharia Madrasa, Moskapur
- Fulshaind Darul Kerath Dhakil Madrasa
- Gorpur Madrasa
- Hadrat Ali Academy
- Hazrat Shah Jalal Darussunah Yaqubiya Kamil Madrsha
- Jalalia Senior Fazil Degree Madrasah, Jalalpur, South Surma, Sylhet
- Jamea Qasimul Uloom Dargah E Hajrat ShahJalal (R). Sylhet
- Jamea Abu Huraira Ra. Al-Islamia
- Jamia Islamia Hossainia
- Jamia Madania Angura Muhammad Pur
- Jamia Madania Islamia Kazir Bazar
- Jamia Munawa International Madrasah
- Jamia Tawakkulia Renga Madrasah
- Jannatul Ummah Girls Dakhil Madrasah Mathiura
- Lalabazar Alim Madrasa
- Lamligram Madrasa, Beanibazar
- Lawai Islami Dakhil Madrasha
- Madrasah-e-Tayibia Taheria Helimia Sunnia
- Mathiura Senior Fazil Madrasa
- Mullabari Jamea Islamia Dakhil Madrasa
- Sagornal Senior Alim Madrasha
- Satpur Kamil Madrasah, Lamakazi, Bishwanath.
- Serajul Islam Alim Madrasha
- Shahjalal Academy, Subidbazar
- Shahjalal Cadet Madrasah
- Shahjalal Jamia Islamea Kamil Madrasha Pathantula, Sylhet
- Sirajul Islam Alim Madrasah, Sylhet Sadar
- Sujaul Senior Fazil Madrasha
- Sultanpur Madrasa
- Sylhet Cadet Madrasah
- Sylhet Government Alia Madrasah
