= Qazi (name) =

Qazi can be a masculine given name, a middle name, or a surname. Notable people with the name include:

== Given name ==
- Qazi Abdul Majeed Abid, Pakistani politician
- Qazi Mohammad Afzal, Indian politician
- Qazi Hussain Ahmad (1938–2013), Pakistani Islamic scholar
- Qazi Kholiquzzaman Ahmad, Bangladeshi economist
- Qazi Afsaruddin Ahmed (1921–1975), Bangladeshi journalist and writer
- Qazi Mahabub Ahmed, Bangladeshi politician
- Qazi Ahmed Akbar, Pakistani politician
- Qazi Shamsul Alam (1942–2021), cabinet secretary of Bangladesh
- Qazi Khalid Ali, Pakistani lawyer
- Qazi Anwar, Pakistani lawyer
- Qazi Ardaghi, Iranian judge
- Qazi Ashfaq (1967–2001), Pakistani football striker
- Qazi Asif, Pakistani football midfielder and referee
- Qazi Khuda Bakhsh, Pakistani politician
- Qazi Habibul Bashar, Bangladeshi cricket administrator and former cricketer
- Qazi Beiza'i (fl. 13th century), Iranian writer
- Qazi Adnan Fareed, Pakistani politician
- Qazi Muhammad Farooq (1938–2026), Pakistani jurist
- Qazi Fazilat, Sur Empire official
- Qazi Imdadul Haq, British India writer
- Qazi Azizul Haque, British India inventor and police official
- Qazi Motahar Hossain, Bangladeshi teacher, activist, and chess player
- Qazi Altaf Hussain, Pakistani military official
- Qazi Anwar Hussain (1936–2022), Bangladeshi writer
- Qazi Massarrat Hussain (1935–2021), Pakistani field hockey player
- Qazi Zafar Hussain, British India leader of the Muslim League
- Qazi Faez Isa, Pakistani jurist
- Qazi Muhammad Isa, Pakistani diplomat and politician
- Qazi Baharul Islam, Bangladeshi academic and bank chairman
- Qazi Ataullah Khan, Pakistani politician
- Qazi Hamidullah Khan, Pakistani Islamic scholar
- Qazi Athar Mubarakpuri, Indian Islamic scholar
- Qazi Mohib (1963–1996), Pakistani field hockey player
- Qazi Azizul Mowla, Bangladeshi architecture academic
- Qazi Muhammad (1893–1947), Iranian Islamic cleric and Republic of Mahabad political leader
- Qazi Faiz Muhammad (1908–1982), Pakistani politician and writer
- Qazi Ghulam Mustafa (died c. 1711), Mughal Empire nobleman
- Qazi Nisar, Kashmiri political leader

- Qazi Yasir, Kashmiri political leader, son of Qazi Nisar

- Qazi Muhammad Nizamuddin, Indian politician
- Qazi Shams-ud-Din Rajar, Pakistani politician
- Qazi Ahmad Saeed, Pakistani politician
- Qazi Salahuddin (born 1942), Pakistani field hockey player
- Qazi Saleem (1930–2005), Indian politician and poet
- Qazi Abdul Sattar, Indian novelist
- Qazi Isa Savaji (died 1491), Persian bureaucrat
- Qazi Shibli, Kashmiri journalist
- Qazi Nurullah Shustari (1549–1610), Mughal Empire Islamic jurist and scholar
- Qazi Mohamed bin Hajj Ali Thukkala, Maldivian justice
- Qazi Touqeer, Indian singer
- Qazi Onik (born 1999), Bangladeshi cricketer
- Qazi Qadan, Samma dynasty Sufi poet
- Qazi Mazhar Qayyum, Pakistani politician
- Qazi Fazlullah Ubaidullah, Pakistani politician
- Qazi Fazl Ullah, Pakistani-American Islamic scholar
- Qazi Abdul Waheed (born 1922), Pakistani field hockey player
- Qazi Wajid (1930–2018), Pakistani actor
- Qazi Amin Waqad (1947–2021), Afghan politician
- Qazi Muhammad Yousaf, religious leader of the Ahmadiyya
- Qazi Abu Yusuf, Bangladeshi politician

== Middle name ==
- Ali Qazi Askar, Iranian Islamic cleric
- Azhar Qazi Mashwani, Pakistani politician
- Mohammad Ali Qazi Tabatabaei, Iranian politician and Islamic cleric

== Surname ==
- Abdullah Qazi (born 1987), Pakistani football defender
- Abrar Qazi, Indian television actor
- Ashraf Qazi, Pakistani diplomat and politician
- Gul Rahman Qazi, Afghan scholar
- Hassam Qazi (1961–2004), Pakistani actor
- Izhar Qazi (1957–2007), Pakistani actor and singer
- Javed Ashraf Qazi, Pakistani military officer and politician
- Khalid Qazi, Indian-American physician
- Mohammad Qazi, Pakistani cricketer
- Mubarak Qazi (1955–2023), Pakistani poet
- Shafat Qazi, Kashmiri-American entrepreneur and film producer
- Shahida Qazi, Pakistani journalist and academic
- Tahira Qazi (1951–2014), Pakistani school principal
