= Sylhet Sadar Upazila =

Upazila in Sylhet Division, Bangladesh

Sylhet Sadar সিলেট সদর
- Upazila
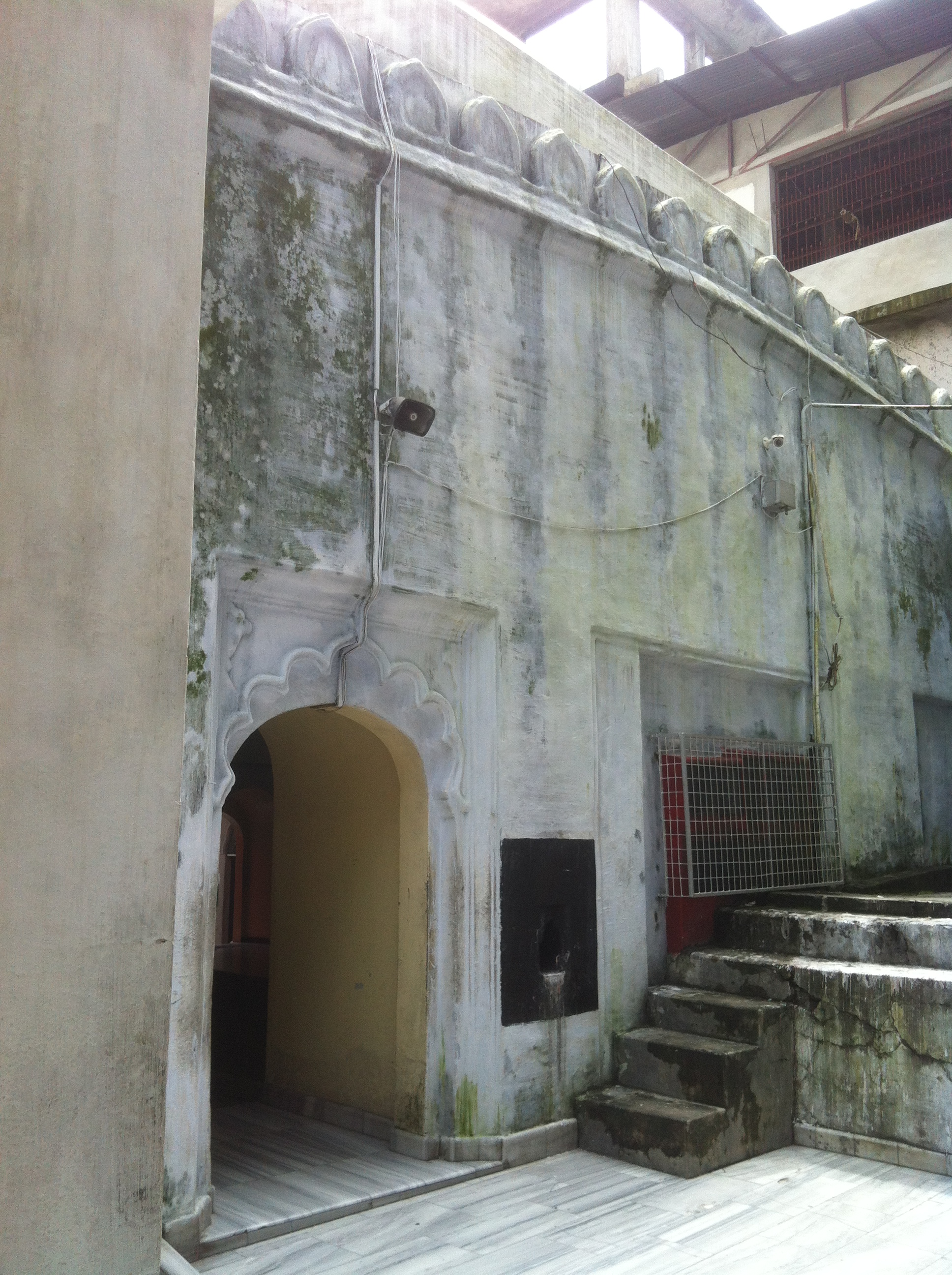
- Inside the Shah Jalal Dargah in Sylhet sadar

- Country: Bangladesh
- Division: Sylhet
- District: Sylhet
- Headquarters: Sylhet

Government
  - MP (Sylhet-1): Khandaker Abdul Muktadir (BNP)

Area
  - Upazila: 301.80 km^{2} (116.53 sq mi)

Population (2022)
  - Upazila: 936,237
  - Density: 3,102.2/km^{2} (8,034.6/sq mi)
  - Metro: 491,294
- Time zone: UTC+6 (BST)
- Postal code: 3100
- Area code: 0821

Sylhet Sadar (Bengali: সিলেট সদর) is an upazila of Sylhet District in the Division of Sylhet, Bangladesh.

Sylhet Sadar Upazila mauza geocode map

== Geography ==
Sylhet Sadar is located at 24.8917°N 91.8833°E. It has 158,233 households and a total area of 301.80 km^{2}. The city of Sylhet is located within central of Sylhet Sadar.

== Demographics ==
Religions in Sylhet Sadar Upazila (2022)
Religion	Percent
Islam	91.83%
Hinduism	7.98%
Other or not stated	0.19%

According to the 2022 Bangladeshi census, Sylhet Sadar Upazila had 84,780 households and a population of 444,914. 9.74% of the population were under 5 years of age. Sylhet Sadar had a literacy rate (age 7 and over) of 77.63%: 80.38% for males and 74.77% for females, and a sex ratio of 103.98 males for every 100 females. 57,373 (12.90%) lived in urban areas. Ethnic population is 6394 (1.44%).

According to the 2011 Census of Bangladesh, Sylhet Sadar Upazila had 158,233 households and a population of 829,103. 185,388 (22.36%) were under 10 years of age. Sylhet Sadar had a literacy rate (age 7 and over) of 61.29%, compared to the national average of 51.8%, and a sex ratio of 899 females per 1000 males. 526,412 (63.49%) lived in urban areas. Ethnic population was 6,205 (0.75%), of which Manipuri were 2,447.

At the 1991 Bangladesh census, Sylhet Sadar had a population of 554,412, of whom 287,304 were aged 18 or older. Males constituted 52.51% of the population, and females 47.49%. Sylhet Sadar had an average literacy rate of 87.6%, among them male 49.0%, female 51.0% (7+ years), and with the national average being 32.4% literate. Major religions are Muslim 81.26%, Hindu 17.43%, Buddhist, Christian and others 0.31%.

== Arts and culture ==
The rich culture of Sylhet Sadar Upazila includes such major national festivals as Bangladesh Independence Day, Victory Day, Language Movement Day, Pohela Baishakh are widely celebrate in the upazila. Traditional and religious festivals like Eid-ul-Fitr, Eid-ul-Azha, Raspurnima, Jhulan Jatra and Roth Jatra, Christmas and other religious festivals are peacefully and widely celebrated by people of different religions. It is the place of the mausoleum of Shah Jalal. There are also many historical and cultural sites situated in this upazila.

== Administration ==
Sylhet Sadar Upazila is divided into eight union parishads: Hatkhola, Jalalabad, Kandigaon, Khadimnagar, Khadimpara, Mogalgaon, Tuker Bazar, and Tultikar. The union parishads are subdivided into 86 mauzas and 353 villages.

== Education ==
The average literacy rate of Sylhet Sadar Upazila is 87.6%; male 57.2%, female 44.0%. It is a place of high educational institutions of Sylhet Division.

One of the advanced agricultural universities established in Bangladesh is Sylhet Agricultural University. There are also other colleges such as Sylhet Government College, Sylhet Engineering College, Murari Chand College, and Osmani Medical College,Institute of Health Technology, Sylhet Sylhet Polytechnic Institute. Other notable educational institutions are Sylhet Cadet College, Sylhet Agricultural University, Madan Mohan College, State College, Sylhet Government Women's College and Sylhet Law College. There are also four private universities in Sylhet Sadar, namely Leading University, Sylhet International University, Metropolitan University, and North East University.

There are also three private medical colleges in Sylhet Sadar Upazila, namely Jalalabad Ragib-Rabeya Medical College and Hospital, Sylhet Women's Medical College and Parkview Medical College. Jalalabad Ragib-Rabeya Medical College is the largest; established in 1995, founded by philanthropist Ragib Ali and his wife Rabeya Khatun.

Few famous schools around here is: Govt. Agragami Girls High School and College, Sylhet, Sylhet Govt. Pilot High School etc. Hazrat Shah Jajal (R) High School and Hazrat Shah Paran (R) High School are notable secondary schools.

There are cantonment public schools and colleges, such as Jalalabad Cantonment Public School and College and Sylhet Cantonment Public School and College, under Bangladesh Army control.

Notable British Curriculum schools are The Sylhet Khajanchibari International School & College, RISE (Royal Institute of Smart Education) and Anandaniketan.

== See also ==
- Upazilas of Bangladesh
- Districts of Bangladesh
- Divisions of Bangladesh
