= Punjab Muslim League =

Branch of the Muslim League in Punjab, British India

- President: Muhammad Ali Jinnah
- Historical Leaders: Sir Mian Muhammad Shafi; Sir Muhammad Iqbal; Malik Barkat Ali
- Founded: 1907
- Dissolved: 1947
- Headquarters: Lahore, Punjab, British India
- Ideology: Two Nation Theory
- National affiliation: AIML

When the All-India Muslim League was founded at Dacca, on 30 December 1906 at the occasion of the annual All India Muhammadan Educational Conference, It was participated by the Muslim leaders from Punjab, i.e., Sir Mian Muhammad Shafi, Mian Fazl-i-Hussain, Abdul Aziz, Khawaja Yusuf Shah and Sh. Ghulam Sadiq. Earlier Mian Muhammad Shafi organised a Muslim Association in early 1906, but when the All-India Muslim League was formed, he established its powerful branch in the Punjab of which he became the general secretary. Shah Din was elected as its first president. This branch, organised in November 1907, was known as the Punjab Provincial Muslim League.

== Early years ==
In 1913, Muhammad Ali Jinnah joined the All-India Muslim League, and he was in favour of Hindu – Muslim working relationship like Fazl-i-Hussain, Maulana Muhammad Ali, Pir Taj-ud-Din, Khalifa Shuja-ud-Din and Zafar Ali Khan wanted to befriend the Indian National Congress to attain self-government through constitutional means.

In 1916, Muhammad Ali Jinnah, negotiated with the Indian National Congress to reach an agreement to pressure the British Government to have a more liberal approach to India and give Indians more authority to run their country. The Muslim League changed its major objective and decided to join hands with the Congress to put pressure on the British government. Prior to this, the main objective of the Muslim League was to preserve only Muslim interests.

However, Muslim leaders from Punjab, led by Muhammad Shafi stood for the preservation of Muslim rights without alienating the sympathies of the British government and opposed the Lucknow Pact signed on 28 December 1916.

Muhammad Shafi and his other conservative friends like Maulvi Rafi-ud-Din, Abdul Aziz and Syed Ali Raza opposed the cooperation between the All-India Muslim League and the Indian National Congress, on the grounds that it would sacrifice the Muslim majority in provinces of Punjab and Bengal. He wanted to stress the separate Muslim entity and refused to give up his thinking, which according to him was the very blood of the Muslim nation.

According to S. Qalb-i-Abid the conservative leaders in the Punjab Muslim League under Sir Muhammad Shafi's leadership were advised by the Punjab's administration to revolt against the supporters of Muhammad Ali Jinnah on various important political developments from time to time. The revolt against Mr. Jinnah became very serious splitting the Punjab Muslim League into two groups – the Jinnah group and the Shafi group. These deep divisions had earlier been created with British support on the eve of the conclusion of the historic Lucknow Pact of 1916 between the Congress and the Muslim League.

== Delhi Muslim proposals and Simon Commission ==
In 1926, Sir Muhammad Shafi's was elected as president, while Sir Muhammad Iqbal was elected as general secretary. It is worth mentioning that Sir Muhammad Iqbal was also elected as a member of Punjab Council in the same year and started his political innings in a tremendous manner. During the period between 1927 and 1930, Punjab Muslim League also opposed central All India Muslim League due to differences over Delhi proposals and boycott of Simon Commission.

On the last two issues, Mr. Jinnah was sincerely trying to find a solution of ever-increasing communalism in Indian politics and at the same time he was trying to establish a common front for the freedom of India. But the Punjabi group of politicians with the support of British administration in India, engineered a coup d'état against Mr. Jinnah's leadership and successfully relegated the All India Muslim League to the background. At this point in time, both the British administration and the Congress party were happy that in their opinion, Mr. Jinnah could no longer represent the Muslims of British India. The All India Muslim Conference with official patronage emerged as a political organisation under the leadership of Sir Sultan Muhammad Shah Aga Khan to represent the Muslims opinion in India replacing the All India Muslim League with all practical purposes.

Nehru Report (1928) not only worsened the political situation but also ended the hopes of any future rapprochement between Hindus and the Muslims. It had left no alternatives for Muslims except to think in terms of separation from Indian federation and to ask for division of India. Due to this report, both Punjab Muslim League and All India Muslim League forgot their difference and the Muslim leaders took almost identical position on various issues

The British governor of the Punjab and the UP arranged a very high position for the Unionist party's top brass, their allies and also for their nominees to assume a leading role in all the negotiations for constitutional advance in India at the Round Table Conferences in London in 1930s leading to the Government of India Act – 1935. The All India Muslim League had little to say in these negotiations and it was under these circumstances that Mr. Jinnah had to spend a few years in self-exile in London.

== Allahabad address ==
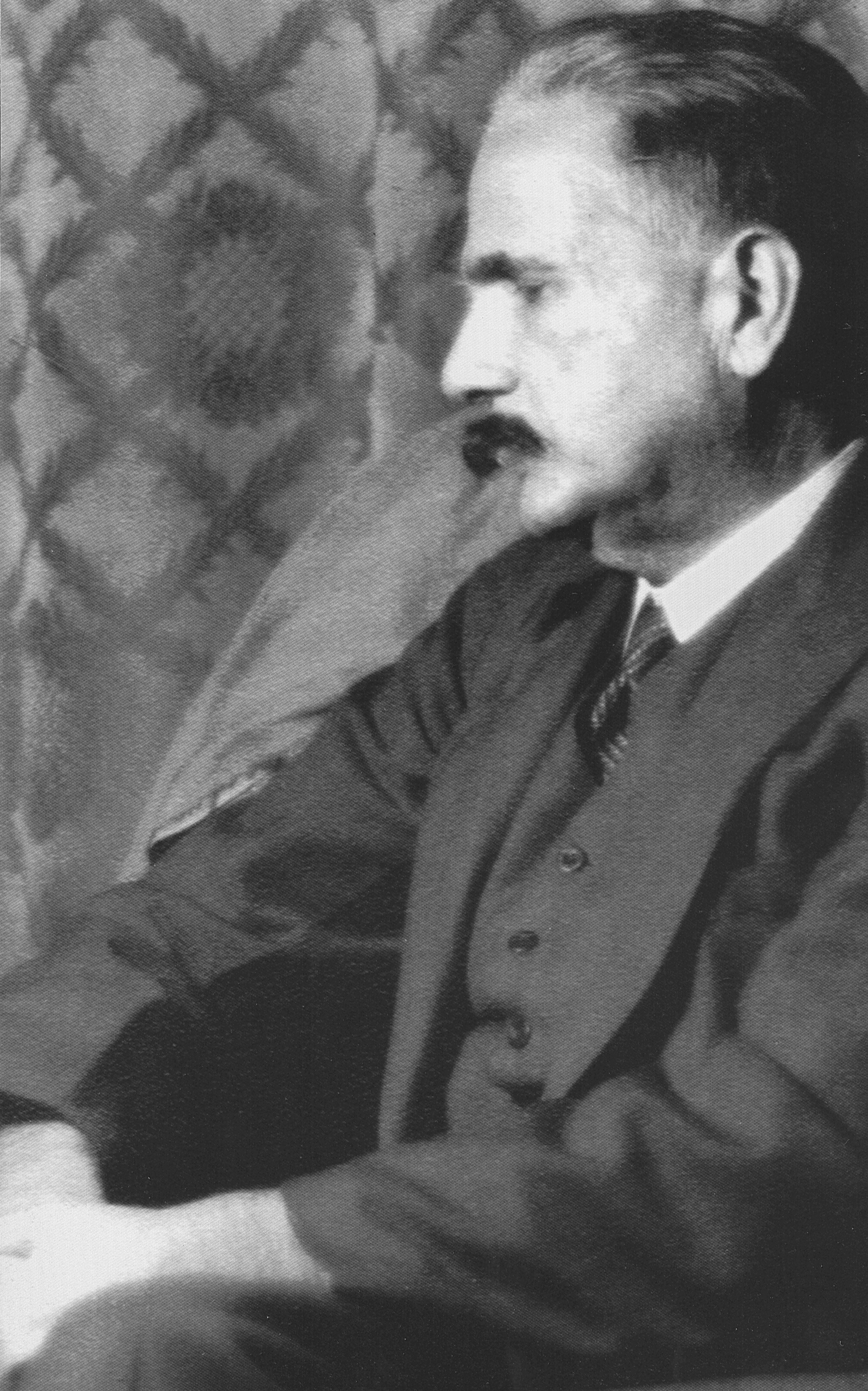
Sir Muhammad Iqbal

On 29 December 1930 Sir Muhammad Iqbal delivered his monumental address. He said:

I would like to see Punjab, North-West Frontier Province, Sindh and Balochistan amalgamated into a single state. Self government within the British Empire or without the British Empire, the formation of a consolidated North-West Indian Muslim state appears to me to be the final destiny of the Muslims, at least of North-West India.

Sir Muhammad Iqbal did not use the word "Pakistan" in his address. According to some scholars, that Iqbal had not presented the idea of an autonomous Muslim State; rather he wanted a large Muslim province by amalgamating Punjab, Sindh, NWFP and Baluchistan into a big North-Western province within India. They argued that "Iqbal never pleaded for any kind of partition of the country. Rather he was an ardent proponent of a 'true' federal setup for India..., and wanted a consolidated Muslim majority within the Indian Federation".

Another Indian historian Tara Chand also held that Iqbal was not thinking in terms of independence but in terms of a federation of autonomous states within India. Dr. Safdar Mehmood also fell a prey to the same misconception and in a series of articles he asserted that in Allahabad address Iqbal proposed a Muslim majority province within the Indian federation and not an independent state outside the Indian Federation.

On 28 January 1933, Choudhary Rahmat Ali voiced his ideas in the pamphlet entitled "Now or Never; Are We to Live or Perish Forever?" The word 'Pakistan' referred to "the five Northern units of India, viz. : Punjab, North-West Frontier Province (Afghan Province), Kashmir, Sind and Baluchistan"". By the end of 1933, the word "Pakistan" became common vocabulary where an “I” was added to ease pronunciation (as in Afghan-i-stan). In a subsequent book Rehmat Ali discussed the etymology in further detail. "Pakistan' is both a Persian and an Urdu word. It is composed of letters taken from the names of all our South Asia homelands; that is, Punjab, Afghania, Kashmir, Sindh and Balochistan. It means the land of the Pure".

According to some scholars, "Rehmat Ali’s concept of Pakistan was nebulous, impractical and fantasy-ridden. It was to include the entire northwest of India, Kashmir, the Kathiawar peninsula, Kutch, and several enclaves deep within UP, including Delhi and Lucknow. There were to be two independent Muslim states besides Pakistan: Bangistan comprising Bengal and Assam in the east and Osmanistan in the south. These two were to form a federation with Pakistan. The 243 principalities or Rajwaras were to be divided among caste Hindus and “others” and then herded together in a ghetto called Hanoodia. As for the Sikhs, they were to be pushed into an enclave called Sikhia. Other races and religions were to inhabit an encampment by the name of Hanadika. Every non-Muslim was to remain subservient to the master race he called “The Paks”, and yes, the subcontinent was to be renamed Dinia. He did not say how he was going to bring all that about."

The British and the Indian Press vehemently criticised these two different schemes and created a confusion about the authorship of the word "Pakistan" to such an extent that even Jawahur Lal Nehru had to write: ""Iqbal was one of the early advocates of Pakistan and yet he appears to have realised its inherent danger and absurdity. Edward Thompson has written that in the course of conversation, Iqbal told him that he had advocated Pakistan because of his position as president of Muslim League session, but he felt sure that it would be injurious to India as a whole and to Muslims especially."

Sir Muhammad Iqbal disapproved the scheme of Ch. rahmat Ali because there were seven or eight other imaginary and utopian ‘…stans’ linked with this scheme. He wrote to Prof. Edward John Thompson of Oxford University, that

You call me a protagonist of the scheme called "Pakistan". Now Pakistan is not my scheme. (Iqbal is here, referring to Ch. Rehmat Ali's scheme of Pakistan) The one that I suggested in my address is the creation of a Muslim Province – i.e.; a province having an overwhelming population of Muslims in the North-West of India. This new province will be, according to my scheme, a part of the proposed Indian Federation. Pakistan scheme (i.e., scheme of Ch. Rahmat Ali) proposes a separate federation of Muslim Provinces directly related to England as a separate dominion. This scheme originated in Cambridge. The authors of this scheme believe that we Muslim Round Tablers have sacrificed the Muslim nation on the altar of Hindu or the so called Indian Nationalism.

Like Iqbal, Jinnah also disapproved this scheme and considered it

as some sort of Walt Disney dreamland, if not Wellsian nightmare", and thought that "he felt the professional's contempt for the amateur's mistake of showing his hand without holding the trumps.

== Punjab Muslim league and Unionist Party (Punjab) ==
In the meantime, the British Government and Punjab administration was able to create a very dedicated class of loyal supporters of the British raj among the Punjab Muslims, (represented by the Unionist Party) the Sikhs and the followers of Hindu Mahasabha. This loyalist class seriously and most sincerely believed that the interests of their communities they represent were identical with those of the British government. In 1924, the Punjab Unionist party was established to follow this policy as a role model among of course other objectives such as to protect the interest of the landed classes.

In 1934, Jinnah returned to India with a new mission and a new vision to revive the Muslim League at centre and provincial levels. However, the actual reorganisation started in 1936 to contest the upcoming elections a year later.

According to Khurram Mahmood, if we observe only Punjab as being a Muslim majority province, there was no support for Muslim League, of any type from rural areas except some limited urban circles. Therefore, to secure the support of Muslim masses, Jinnah comprehended that it was essential to reorganise PPML. Jinnah was much concerned about the future of League in Punjab, because being a Muslim majority province it held a significant position in his eyes. As far as the re-organization of League was concerned, it was a long-term plan and could take several years, but election was due shortly. Therefore, Jinnah decided to co-opt with Unionist Party. For him it was the best solution as a short cut to the successful rebirth of Punjab Muslim League.

He requested Fazl-i-Hussain, president of Unionist Party to preside the AIML session at Bombay in April 1936.

Fazl-i-Hussain declined the offer of Jinnah on account of his bad health, and calculating the advantages and disadvantages of his alliance with a purely Muslim Party, Fazl-i-Husain refused to oblige Mr. Jinnah. The Unionist Party leaders had decided to challenge the revival of the Punjab Muslim League and defeat Jinnah's efforts to put a new life into it. The Unionist Party was the in-charge of the corridors of the powers in the Punjab and therefore, their leaders were in the driving seats.

Private papers, letters and correspondence to and from the Unionist leaders indicated that they had made plans to keep the Punjab Muslim League out of politics and to keep the Punjab Muslims away from the activities of the Punjab Muslim League under the leadership of Allama Muhammad Iqbal.

Sir Sikandar Hayat Khan, who later became Punjab's chief minister advised Jinnah to keep his finger 'out of Punjab pie' – 'and if the meddles – Jinnah might burn his fingers'.

His successor Malik Khizar Hayat Tiwana refused to alienate the Unionist Party's Hindu and Sikh supporters, and was opposed to the partition of India as well.

== 1937 Elections ==
As anticipated, in the 1937 elections the Unionist party was able to win a heavy mandate of the Muslims of the Punjab. On the other hand, the Punjab Muslim League was able to win only two seats in the Punjab Assembly. One of the winning candidates, Raja Ghazanfar Ali Khan deserted the PML as soon as the results were officially announced. The other winning candidate was an urban elite, brilliant and an academic lawyer Malik Barkat Ali

Sir Fazl-i-Husain died in 1936, leaving the way clear for Sir Sikandar Hayat Khan to become the first chief minister of the Punjab under the newly introduced provincially autonomy under the act of 1935. Sir Sikander was the strongest chief minister in India getting the support of 95 out of 175 members of the Punjab Assembly. He laid the foundation of the strongest pro-government ministry in the Punjab.

Contrary to his expectations, the Congress party soon after resuming power in India made Sir Sikandar's life extremely difficult in the Punjab. The Punjab Congress and their allies like the Khaksars, Majlis-e-Itihad-e-Millat and the Ahrars pooled their resources to give Sir Sikander a very tough opposition. He and his party could no longer afford to be politically isolated and some sort of alliance with the Punjab Muslim League, no matter how loose it may be, was essential for the survival of Sikandar Ministry.

He agreed to sign a pact with Jinnah called as Sikandar-Jinnah Pact. Sikandar Hayat Khan's motives remain unclear, but it is suspected that he hoped to become the leader of Muslim League in his own province, if not its ultimate leader. Whatever be the reason, this helped the Muslim League to carve out a niche in Punjab.

The PML leaders like Allama Muhammad Iqbal and Malik Barkat Ali, were not happy with this situation and began to send a catalogue of complaints to Jinnah against Sir Sikander alleging that the Punjab Premier had been hindering the growth the PML at all levels and both Barkat Ali and Iqbal also recommended the rupture of Sikandar-Jinnah alliance and punish the Punjab Premier.

Iqbal died in 1938 and Sir Shahnawaz Mamdot who was a personal friend of Sir Sikandar Hayat Khan, became the Punjab Muslim League leader. The Nawab due to his connections with the British administrators and also due to his friendship with Sikander was not in favour of severing links with the Unionist party. Moreover, it seems that Jinnah would have made his own calculations that at least for the time being playing for time was the best policy in dealing with Sir Sikandar Hayat's policies based on maintaining the status quo model in Punjab politics. Muhammad Ali Jinnah was a man of vision and farsightedness and he fully understood the limitations of the Punjab Muslim League analysing that Iqbal was a poet-philosopher and Barket Ali had personal grievances against Sikandar; and that putting undue pressure on Sir Sikandar was not in the best interest of the Punjab Muslim League.

The next biggest move by the Muslim League was passage of Lahore Resolution, in March 1940 which entailed the dismemberment of the Punjab and the division of India into Hindu and Muslim states. The Lahore resolution created many problems for Sikander and his successor Khizr Hayat Tiwana. The co-operation between PML and the Unionist therefore did not last long because Sir Sikander once again tried to sail into two boats. However his dual loyalty was tolerated by the League leadership and no strict action was taken against him.

Khizr was appointed chief minister of Punjab because of his family's deep loyalty to the British.

When he was considered for the chief ministership, there were eminent and experienced politicians available; they were Nawab Muzaffar Ali Khan, Nawab Sir Liaqat Hayat Khan and Malik Sir Feroz Khan Noon. However, the governor perhaps preferred Khizr because he was expected to rely more on his advice. When Khizr committed many political blunders and adopted anti-Muslim League policies, the alliance between the two parties came to an end. The Muslim supporters of Unionist party were therefore advised by the Muslim League to divorce themselves from the Unionist Party and join the Muslim League ranks as early as possible.

Thereafter the Muslim supporters of the Unionist party were trickling towards the Muslim League. Some leading Sajjada Nasheens and Pirs joined the Muslim League and later on they appealed to the Muslims to support the Muslim League's Pakistan Movement because by doing so they will be supporting the cause of Islam.

== 1946 Elections ==
On 21 August 1945 the viceroy announced that elections would be held that Winter to the Central and Provincial Legislative Assemblies. They were to precede the convention of a constitution-making body for British India. The Muslim League had to succeed in this crucial test if its popular support of its demand for Pakistan was to be credible. In particular it had to succeed in the Punjab as there could be no Pakistan without that province. But in the Punjab's last elections held in 1937 the League had fared disastrously. It had put forward a mere seven candidates for the 85 Muslim seats and only two had been successful. One of those candidates, Raja Ghazanfar Ali Khan also deserted the Punjab Muslim League, so there was only one Successful candidate of Punjab Muslim League.

On 23 February 1946, all the results of the elections were known and the Punjab Press reported with big headlines the crushing defeat of the Unionist party. Only 13 Muslims were elected on the Unionist ticket, even some of their minister lost their securities in the elections. The Muslim League won a grand victory by capturing 73 seats of a total of 86. Even at this stage, the Congress was all out to install a Unionist ministry to keep the Muslim League out of power.

The 1946 elections proved to be turning point in the history of the Punjab Muslim League. In the 1946 election campaign, the Muslim League was able to publicise its views widely. It claimed that Islam was threatened by Congress. "Pirs" and "Sajjada Nashin" helped the Muslim League to attract Muslim voters. By early 1946, the Muslim League had been able to secure the support of many leading families of Punjab and also eminent Pirs and Sajjada Nasheens.

To give one example of his own area Khizr Hayat Tiwana faced strong opposition from the descendants of Pirs and sajjada Nashins. In district Shahpur, Khwaja Qamar ul Din Sialvi, Qazi Zafar Hussain, and Qazi Mazhar Qayyum gave tough competition to Tiwanas. Khwaja Qamar ul Din Sialvi of Sial Sharif, a descendant of great pir Khawaja Sham-ud-Din was president of District Shahpur Muslim League. He was very influential in his region. Likewise Qazis of Soon Valley and descendants of Sufi Qazi Mian Muhammad Amjad commanded great respect in their areas. They appealed to their people to vote against Tiwanas. With regard to the exertion of religious influence over the people, and their father Qazi Mian Muhammad Amjad. According to SARAH F. D. ANSARI, the Sajjada Nashin or Pir families were not so rich in terms of land as the great land lords of Punjab but these Sajjada Nashin or Pir families exerted great political and religious influence over the people.

According to Ayesha Jalal, David Gimartin believes that a number of pirs developed a personal stake in the League's election campaign; not because this was the most appropriate tactical response to the prospect of a British transfer of power but because the pirs saw in the Pakistan movement an opportunity to break out of the colonial structures that had for so long thwarted their religious interests.

Pakistan came into being on 14 August 1947, "Pakistan would never have come into being", Talbot argues, "had the Unionist Party held on to the support of Muslim rural elites during the 1946 Punjab Provincial Assembly Election. The Muslim Landlords and Pirs joined the Muslim League before the 1946 election, without its victory in Punjab in that election", Talbot asserts, "the Muslim League would not have gotten Pakistan".

Penderel Moon simply attributes the League's rise to power to the alluring and irresistible appeal of the Pakistan cry to the Muslim masses. Peter Hardy's explained that the Muslim League gained its electoral success in the Punjab by making a religious appeal over the heads of the professional politicians. Pakistani historians have explained the League's success in the Punjab, as elsewhere in the subcontinent, solely in terms of the Two Nation Theory. Whatever the historians may suggest, one thing is clear that League's success was due to the political vision, farsightedness of Muhammad Ali Jinnah. He was a man of high personal integrity and intelligence who became a Grandmaster of the game by his clever, and clever calculations.

== Role in communal violence ==
In the few years before the partition, the Muslim League "monetarily subsidized" mobs that engaged in communal violence against Hindus and Sikhs in the areas of Multan, Rawalpindi, Campbellpur, Jhelum and Sargodha, as well as in the Hazara District. The Muslim League paid assassins money for every Hindu and Sikh they murdered. As such, leaders of the Muslim League, including Muhammad Ali Jinnah, issued no condemnation of the violence against Hindus and Sikhs in the Punjab.

== See also ==
- Muhammad Ali Jinnah
- All India Azad Muslim Conference
- Direct Action Day
- Indian Independence Movement
- Indian Muslim nationalism
- Indian Nationalism
- Indian National Congress
- Muslim League (Pakistan)
- Pakistan Movement
- Pakistan Muslim League
