= Qazi Hussain =

Qazi Hussain is the name of:

- Qazi Hussain Ahmad (1938–2013), president of the Islamist political party in Pakistan
- Qazi Anwar Hussain (born 1936), Bangladeshi writer
- Qazi Mahbub Hussain (died 2006), Bangladeshi writer
- Qazi Altaf Hussain (1920–1999), British Indian Army and Pakistan Army officer
- Qazi Massarrat Hussain (1936–2021), Pakistani Olympic hockey player
- Qazi Zafar Hussain (died 1968), Indian Muslim imam and scholar
