= Playgroup =

Playgroup may refer to:

- Pre-school playgroup, a kind of pre-school care
- Playgroup (band), a British dance act
