= Cambridge Grammar School & College =

Location
- 90, Provati, East Pirmoholla, Amberkhana, Sylhet-3100; Bangladesh
- Coordinates: 24.9125°N 91.8690°E

Information
- Type: Private
- Motto: Committed to meet the challenge of 21st century
- Established: 2004
- Session: January–December
- Grades: Playgroup - IAL
- Gender: Coeducational
- Language: English
- Hours in school day: 9 A.M - 2:15 P.M for students
- Colours: White and Navy Blue uniform
- Sports: Kabaddi, football, cricket, badminton
- Website: Official website

Cambridge Grammar School & College is a private English-medium school in Sylhet, Bangladesh. The school was established in 2004. The school prepares its students for the International General Certificate of Secondary Education and the General Certificate of Education Advanced Level. It offers the Edexcel syllabus by Pearson Education in its high school and college form. It is the first institution in Sylhet to introduce Pearson Edexcel IGCSE conducted by British Council. Mohammad Abdus Shahid is the principal of the school.

== History ==
The school was set up to meet the demands for schools having English as the medium of instruction but emphasizing equal proficiency in Bengali.

== System of education ==
The school follows the National Curriculum and Textbook Board curriculum of Bangladesh from class I to X. Students sit for public examination at the end of class V, VIII, X. Students under the British Curriculum are able to study from very beginning up to class XII.

=== Pre-Primary School: playgroup to kindergarten ===
Children of age 4 to 6 are given basic knowledge in pre-primary level. Examinations are taken in written in Nursery and Kindergarten.

=== Primary School: class I to V ===
The primary school programme comprises from class I to V. In classes I to V, the school follows an integrated curriculum by drawing on teaching programmes of the National Curriculum and Textbook Board. The students sit for the Primary Education Completion examination at the end of class V conducted by the Ministry of Primary and Mass Education of Bangladesh.

=== Junior School: class VI to VIII ===
Students sit for the Junior School Certificate examination held by the Ministry of Education of Bangladesh at the end of class VIII. Students studying British Curriculum follow their respective curriculum.

=== Secondary School: class IX to X ===
The school offers the Pearson Education Edexcel syllabus in class IX and X, where students prepare for the IGCSE Programme. Students following National Curriculum and Textbook Board curriculum of Bangladesh sit for Secondary School Certificate examination at the end of class X.

=== Higher Secondary School: class XI to XII ===
The college form of the school provides General Certificate of Education Advanced Level under the Edexcel syllabus. Students following British curriculum can sit for the exams in any session (January or May–June).

== Uniform ==
The school has a compulsory uniform. Girls can choose between long skirts, short skirts, "borkhas". Young boys can choose between long pants or short pants while older boys only have a choice of long pants. The pants and skirts are navy blue for students. Shirts are the same for all, which consists of long or short sleeves white shirt which have to be tucked in. Students also have to wear a navy blue tie with the school's logo in yellow. Other compulsory uniform are black shoes and white socks with tidy hair (tied back for girls). Also no make-up or jewellery is permitted other than a watch or small studs for girls. Scarfs are not mandatory. The school logo is embedded on the pocket of the shirt. The shoulder badges are there in the shirts with triple stripes in yellow.

== Campus ==
The school consists of a single campus in the urban area of Sylhet. The campus building is three-storied. There are two playfields in the campus. It has 14 classrooms, a science lab, two teacher's common rooms, and two teacher's cabins.

== Extra-curricular activities ==
The school arranges annual sports along with annual cultural programme. Intra-school debate competition was held in 2014.

== See also ==
- List of educational institutions in Sylhet
