= Qazi Zafar Hussain =

Khan Sahib, Qazi Zafar Hussain came from a qadi's family which had, since the 16th century, been prominent among the landed aristocracy of the Soon Valley. He belonged to Awans tribe of ancient repute. He was awarded the title of Khan Sahib by the British Crown. This was a formal title, a compound of khan (leader) and sahib (Lord), which was conferred in Mughal Empire and British India. Although his father, Qazi Mian Muhammad Amjad forbade his descendants to establish Dargah, he was considered Sajjada Nashin by the people of his area. "Sajjada nashins" David Gilmartin asserts, "claimed to be the descendants of the Sufi, 'saints', intermediaries between the Faithful and their God, and this cut against the grain of Islamic orthodoxy ... in kind, of their special religious status, these sajjada nashins had become men of local standing in their own right." However he never claimed to be a Sajjada Nashin. In the Punjab, the sajjada nashin or pir families were not so rich in terms of land as the great land lords of Punjab but these sajjada nashin or pir families exerted great political and religious influence over the people. The British could not administer the area without their help and no political party could win the election without their help.

In the early days of Pakistan movement he supported the Unionist Muslim League, Malik Umar Hayat Khan and Sir Sikander Hayat Khan, for the political interest of his tribe, and used his political and social influence to help the people of his area. After 1937, he began to support Punjab Muslim League in the greater interest of Muslims of his area. He used his family and political influence to help the people of his area.

== Early life and career ==
He was born of famous qadi's family of Naushera, Soon Valley. He was the youngest son of Qazi Mian Muhammad Amjad, and youngest brother of 'Raees-Azam Naushera' Qazi Mazhar Qayyum. He was a descendant of Ali Ibn Abi Talib, the fourth caliph of Islam from Al-Abbas ibn Ali. He was great great grandson of Qazi Kalim Ullah, the famous Muslim qadi and jurist of Naushera in the time of Mughal Emperors.

He was the first child in the family who got western education along with the religious education. He got matriculation certificate from Government High School Naushera, and then went to Lahore to get further education and got the degree of veterinary Doctor. He started his career as veterinary Inspector in the Remount Department of British Army in India. He also served in the World War I.

He was a keen collector of horses. He established a stud farm at Hazel Pur, Renala Khurd, where In 1913, Renala Khurd Stud State Farm leased out 5,000 acres (20 km^{2}) of land to the Punjab government to cater to the needs of the army for horses, fodder and dairy products, and the tenancy agreements continued. Renala Khurd is famous for its horses, and horses from Renala Khurd Stud State Farm have won international derby races many times. After his death, this stud farm was look after by his son Lieutenant Colonel Qazi Altaf Hussain

== Title of Khan Sahib ==
In 1945, he was awarded by the title of Khan Sahib by the British Crown in recognition of his services. This was a formal title, a compound of khan (leader) and sahib (Lord), which was conferred in Mughal Empire and British India. It was a title of honour, one degree higher than Khan, conferred on Muslims of British India, and awarded with a decoration during British rule in India.

== Aligarh Movement ==
Like his father, Qazi Mian Muhammad Amjad, he was an admirer of Sir Syed Ahmed Khan educational policies. Although he himself could not go to Aligarh, he sent his two elder sons, Qazi Altaf Hussain and Qazi Fiaz Hussain, to Aligarh Muslim University, and preferred Aligarh Muslim University to Government College Lahore, for his sons. His second son Qazi Fiaz Hussain, however left his studies incomplete at Aligarh University, and went to Sial Sharif and became a Sufi.

== Unionist Muslim League ==
After 1923, when Unionist party was formed by Sir Fazl-e-Hussain, he supported the Unionist Muslim League, Malik Umar Hayat Khan, Sir Sikander Hayat Khan, for the interest of his tribe and the people of his area. He believed like other leaders of the party that economic liberation should precede political liberation or else it would fail. The party won all the elections between 1923 and 1937. During this time, when the Unionist Party formed governments in the Punjab Province, lot of constructive work was done towards debt relief and irrigation system, and a province like Punjab was much dependent on the irrigation system for its agricultural land.

Sufi Sarwar in his book The Soon Valley criticised Qazi Zafar Hussain for supporting the Unionist party, but we must not forget that during that period (1923–1937) the Muslim League was not active in the Punjab. Sir Muhammad Iqbal himself was also a supporter of Unionist Party at that time. According to Ian Talbot, Iqbal and other urbanite Muslim members of PLC (1927–30) shared Fazl-i-Hussain views that Muslim interests could be better served through the Unionist Party, than by adopting a purely Muslim political platform. Samina Yasmeen writes in Communal Politics in Punjab (1925–1947) that "the birth of Unionist Party though was a tool to implement British policy, yet it would be not fair to ignore the contribution of those people who had joined the party with the belief that it will stand for the development of rural masses and would play its role for equitable distribution of monetary resources. They were also optimistic that not only the party would deal with the debt problem but would also take steps to achieve rightful share in services and educational institutions for rural youth. It was propagation of these issues that enabled Unionist rural elites to win over the support of common peasantry who joined the party with the hope that their problems would be resolved."

== Muslim League ==
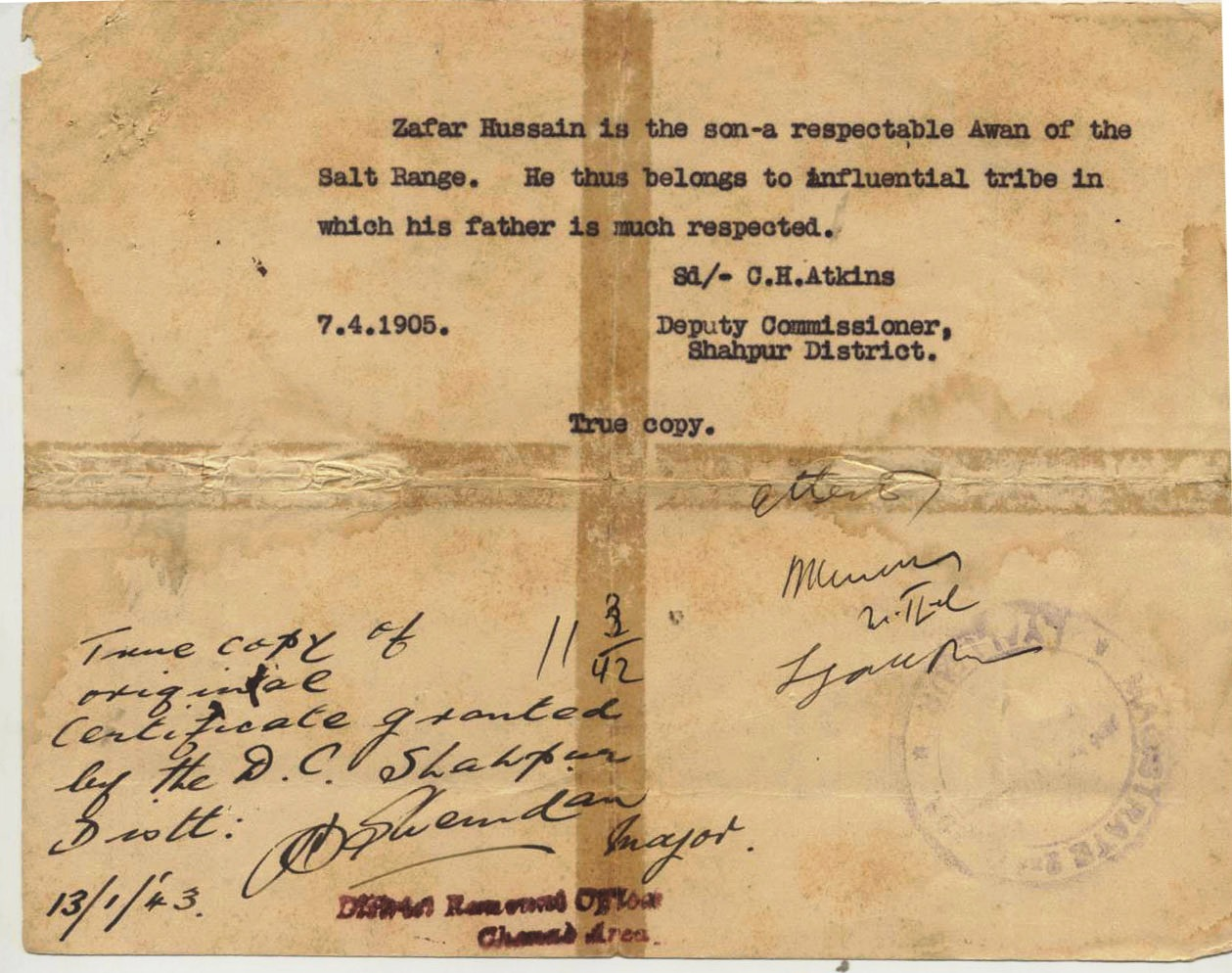
A certificate issued by Deputy Commissioner C.H. Atkins of District Shahpur to Zafar Hussain

When, in May 1936, Sir Muhammad Iqbal appealed to the Muslims of Punjab to support Muslim League, he started thinking about the support of Muslim League, and when in 1937 Sikander-Jinnah pact was signed he started supporting Muslim League.

In 1943, when Quaid-i-Azam Mohammed Ali Jinnah came to Lyallpur and addressed a gathering of over 2 million in the Dhobi Ghat Ground, he arranged a cavalry for the political rally and provided horses for the cavalry of Muslim students, led by his elder son Qazi Altaf Hussain. His second son Qazi Fiaz Hussain sat next to Quaid-Azam Mohammed Ali Jinnah.

He was one of those Muslim rural elites who during the 1946 Punjab Provincial Assembly Election, supported Punjab Muslim League, and, without its victory in Punjab in that election", in the words of Ian Talbot, "the Muslim League would not have gotten Pakistan".

He supported Khwaja Qamar ul Din Sialvi, who was president of District Shahpur Muslim League. He was also very influential in his region. They appealed to their people to vote against Tiwanas who were trying to defeat the Punjab Muslim League candidates in their constituencies. It was their efforts that Muslim League candidates won 100% seats in the constituencies of their area. Ian Talbot, writes "Another leading Chisti, sajjada nashin, Pir Qamaruddin of Sial Sharif held a meeting on the outskirts of the Kalra estate in which he publicly challenged Khizr and Allah Baksh to come to terms with the Muslim League. 'I have never begged for anything in my life before', he declared, 'but today I have come out of my home to beg for votes, believing God is present here (the meeting was being held in a mosque) it is Islamic to ask for vote and "religious" to give them. The Muslim League is purely a religious movement in which all the rich, poor, Sufis and scholars are participating. Not as a pir but even as a Muslim, I have repeatedly advised Nawab Allah Baksh who is my Murid not to desert the Muslims at this critical time."

He died in 1968 at Hazel Pur, Renala Khurd, and was buried in Naushera, Soon Valley.

== See also ==
- Unionist Muslim League
- All-India Muslim League
