= Hameeduddin Siyalwi =

Pakistani politician (1936–2020)

Hameeduddin Siyalwi Senator of Pakistan

Member of the Senate of Pakistan
- In office 1988–1991
- In office 1991–1994

Personal details
- Born: 1936 Siyal, British India
- Died: 17 September 2020 (aged 84) Lahore, Pakistan
- Party: Pakistan Muslim League – Nawaz
- Parent: Qamaruddin Siyalwi (father)
- Education: Darul-Uloom-Zia-Shamsul-Islam

Hameeduddin Siyalwi (1936 – 17 September 2020) was a Pakistani spiritual leader and politician who was the sajjadah nasheen (descendant) of Sufi shrine in Siyal, Sargodha, Pakistan.

== Early life and career ==
He was born in 1936 to a religious family of Siyal and received his early education from Darul-Uloom-Zia-Shamsul-Islam. Later, he started preaching and teaching at Darul-Uloom-Deenia, which he continued for the next two decades.

He was a member of Senate of Pakistan on the ticket of Pakistan Muslim League – Nawaz political party from March 1988 to March 1991 and again from March 1991 to March 1994.

== Public controversy over Khatm-i-Nabuwwat law ==
In December 2017, Pir Hameedudin Sialvi and the Punjab law minister Rana Sanaullah in the Shehbaz Sharif provincial government reportedly had an ongoing controversy covered in the Pakistani press over a public statement made by the minister. Pir Sialvi had strong objections to it and demanded the minister's resignation but the minister refused to resign because he thought his statement was interpreted wrong. Shehbaz Sharif intervened in the matter and also met Sialvi to help resolve it.

As a result of this controversy, many lawmakers in the parliament agreeing with Siyalwi's stand against the PML-N government parted ways with the Pakistan Muslim League – Nawaz.

Earlier, in November 2017, a National Assembly of Pakistan member, Sheikh Muhammad Akram, also a follower of Pir Sialvi, was quoted as saying on a Pakistani TV channel that "he and 14 other members of the party had handed their resignations to Pir Sialvi as they would not compromise on the matter of the Khatm-i-Nabuwwat law". He also added the resigning lawmakers "would abide by whatever decision Pir Sialvi takes in the matter".

== Death ==
He died on 17 September 2020 at age 84. In 2018, he was on his way to Chiniot from Siyal Sharif to participate in a Khatm-e-Nabuwwat (finality of Prophethood) conference, when he fell unconscious. He was later diagnosed by doctors with a clot in his brain that had triggered a brain haemorrhage. Consequently, he became unconscious and went into a coma. Before that, he also had a heart bypass surgery a couple years ago.
