= Siddique-abad (Kufri) =

Pakistani village

Siddique-abad صدیق آباد
- Village and union council
- Country: Pakistan
- Region: Punjab Province
- District: Khushab District
- Tehsil: Naushera, Punjab
- Time zone: UTC+5 (PST)

Siddique-abad (Urdu: صدیق آباد), is a village of Khushab District in the Punjab Province of Pakistan. The Union Council included the Uchalli Wetlands Complex located at 72°14'E, 32° 29'N which has been the focus of conservation activities.
