= Elias Uddin Biswas =

Bangladeshi academic

Vice-chancellor

North East University Bangladesh
- In office 12 January 2021 – 11 January 2025
- Preceded by: Atful Hye Shibly
- Succeeded by: Mohammad Iqbal

Personal details
- Born: 15 December 1964 (age 61) Nabinagar, Godagari Upazila Rajshahi Division, Bangladesh
- Education: Rajshahi University
- Occupation: Professor, University Administrator

Elias Uddin Biswas (born 15 December 1964) is a Bangladeshi educationalist. He is a professor at Mathematics Department at Shahjalal University of Science and Technology (SUST) and a former vice-chancellor at North East University Bangladesh (NEUB). Before joining North East University Bangladesh he served as treasurer and acting vice-chancellor of SUST.

== Early life ==
Elias Uddin Biswas was born on 16 December 1964 in Nabinagar village of Godagari Upazila, Rajshahi Division to father Toimur Rahman Biswas and mother Jumratun Nesa.

== Education ==
Biswas obtained his BSc and MSc degree in mathematics from University of Rajshahi in 1985 and 1986 respectively. He later received his PhD degree in 1998 from the same university.

== Career ==
Biswas joined Shahjalal University of Science and Technology as a lecturer in Mathematics Department in 1994. He was promoted to professor in 2007 and grade-1 professor in 2017.

In addition to teaching and research, he served as treasurer of Shahjalal University of Science and Technology for eight years in two terms. He also has the experience of serving as acting vice-chancellor for various terms while being treasurer. Besides, he has held various important responsibilities including head of Department of Mathematics, director of Student Counseling and Guidance Department, dean of Faculty of Physical Science, provost of residential hall. He also served as professor of mathematics and chairman of Department of Computer Science and Engineering at Jagannath University.

Biswas was appointed as the vice-chancellor of North East University Bangladesh located in Sylhet on January 11, 2021, and officially assumed the responsibility of the vice-chancellor of the university for the next four years on January 12.

== Publications ==
Apart from teaching, Biswas is also involved in writing books. Some of his works include:

- Niruddesh (নিরুদ্দেশ)
- Gonit Utshober proshnottor (গণিত উৎসবের প্রশ্নোত্তর)
- Vasashoinik theke rastonayok (ভাষাসৈনিক থেকে রাষ্ট্রনায়ক)
- Vasa andolon, muktijuddho O Bangladesh (ভাষা আন্দোলন, মুক্তিযুদ্ধ ও বাংলাদেশ)

== Affiliation ==
Biswas is also affiliated with several professional organizations. He served as the joint secretary of Bangladesh University Teachers Federation.
