= Sylhet Khajanchibari International School and College =

School in Bangladesh

The Sylhet Khajanchibari International School & College

Location
- Nayasarak Rd, Sylhet-3100; Bangladesh
- Coordinates: 24.8966714°N 91.8736222°E

Information
- Type: Private
- Session: June–July
- Grades: Playgroup - IAL
- Gender: Coeducational
- Language: English
- Website: skisc.edu.bd

The Sylhet Khajanchibari International School & College is a private English-medium school in Sylhet, Bangladesh. The school prepares its students for the International General Certificate of Secondary Education and the General Certificate of Education Advanced Level. It offers the Edexcel syllabus by Pearson Education in its high school and college form.

== See also ==
- List of educational institutions in Sylhet
