= Qazi Altaf Hussain =

British Indian Army officer

- Born: 1920; Soon Valley, British Indian Empire
- Military career
- Allegiance: British Raj Pakistan
- Branch: Pakistan Army
- Service years: 1945–1965
- Rank: Lieutenant Colonel
- Service number: IO-873
- Unit: 11 Frontier Force Regiment
- Commands: FF-Zhob Militia
- Conflicts: Second World War; Indo-Pakistani War of 1965; Indo-Pakistani War of 1971

Lieutenant Colonel Qazi Altaf Hussain (1920–1999) served in the British Indian Army later taking up a place in the Army of Pakistan. He advanced to various positions of leadership during his military career, serving as lieutenant colonel of the 11 Frontier Force Regiment, commandant of the Zhob Militia in Quetta, Pakistan, and commander of a regiment in the Indo-Pakistani War of 1965. He was forced to retire as a lieutenant colonel, instead of advancing to general, as a result of his short-tempered, frank and outspoken nature.

== Early life ==
Hussain was born into a family whose lineage included a famous Qadi. He was born in Naushera, Soon Valley as the eldest son of Khan Sahib Qazi Zafar Hussain and the grandson of Qazi Mian Muhammad Amjad. He was the great-great-grandson of Qazi Kalim Ullah, another famous Muslim qadi, and jurist of Naushera in the time of the Mughal emperors. He belonged to the Awan tribe.

After graduating from Government High School in Naushera, Hussain studied at Government College in Faisalabad, Government College Lahore; and later Aligarh Muslim University, from which he graduated.

In 1943, Quaid-i-Azam Muhammed Ali Jinnah came to Faisalabad and held a political rally of the All-India Muslim League in the Dhobi Ghat Grounds, where over 2 million people were in attendance. Hussain's father, Khan Sahib Qazi Zafar Hussain, arranged a cavalry of Muslim students for the political rally.

== Army career ==
Hussain was commissioned as a 2nd lieutenant in the British Indian Army in 1945 and soon joined the 11th Frontier Force Regiment. He served in World War II under Sir Olaf Caroe, who administered the North-West Frontier Province during a political crisis.

In 1947, after the creation of Pakistan, he joined the Pakistani Army. He served as the 873rd ranking senior officer. During his service as an infantry officer in the Frontier Force Regiment, Hussain held various positions, including captain, and major and was eventually promoted to lieutenant colonel. He also served in the Indo-Pakistani War of 1965.

Hussain was appointed commandant of Zhob Militia, one of South Asia's oldest military forces, established in 1890 in Quetta.

== Later days ==
Hussain continued to pursue intellectual activities long after his retirement, remaining active well into his seventies. He was an admirer of Sir John Bagot Glubb, and considered him one of the finest historians of Islam in the English language. He also admired Sir Syed Ahmed Khan and Ghulam Ahmed Pervez, and (much to the horror of his religious family, tribe, and the people of his area) he followed and preached their religious views.

After his retirement, he continued to look after family land, and a stud farm at Hazel Pur, Renala Khurd. The farm had been established by his father. After Pakistani President General Muhammad Zia-ul-Haq declared a martial law government in 1977, government forces confiscated Hussain's stud farm. This was in retaliation for Hussain's advocacy against the injustice of the Military Government and the effects of Okara's large military farms on the area's small landowners and peasants.

Hussain died in 1999.

== See also ==
- Frontier Force Regiment
- Pakistan Army
- Lieutenant Colonel
- Robert Groves Sandeman
- Sir Olaf Caroe
- Pakistan
- Awan (Pakistan)
- Aligarh Muslim University
- Zhob
- Lieutenant-General Sir John Bagot Glubb Pasha
- Sir Syed Ahmed Khan
- Ghulam Ahmed Pervez
- All-India Muslim League
- Muhammad Ali Jinnah
