= Anandaniketan School =

School in Bangladesh

Anandaniketan School and College

Location
- Subidbazar, Sylhet-3100; Bangladesh; 24.908910°N 91.856560°E

Information
- Type: Private
- Motto: Knowledge liberates
- Established: 1990
- Session: July–June
- Grades: Playgroup – IAL
- Gender: Coeducational
- Language: English
- Hours in school day: 8am to 2.40pm
- Colours: White and Red uniform for juniors; and White and Black uniform for senior students.
- Sports: football, badminton, chess, table tennis
- Website: ans.eshkul.com

Anandaniketan School & College is a private English-medium school in Sylhet, Bangladesh. The school was established in 1990. The school prepares its students for the International General Certificate of Secondary Education and the General Certificate of Education Advanced Level. It offers the Edexcel syllabus by Pearson Education in its high school and college form. The school has a very selective admission test and chooses few students among thousands of applicants.

== History ==
After three years of planning, the school was found in 1990. The founders are Shampa Reza, Harold Rahseed, Sultana Kamal, Shameem Choudhury, Supriyo Chakrabarty, Nahida Nazneen, Anika Ahmed and Fahmeena Nahas. Currently, the school is operating on its fifth campus and is continuing to expand.

== Extracurricular activities ==
Often considered one of the best school in Sylhet, it has organized extracurricular activities such as poetry recitations, set-speech competitions, debates and music competitions for their students.

The school has also arranged multiple prominent festivals, such as the science festival, the literature festival, and four runs of the 'Amazing Bangladesh' Quiz competition.

== See also ==
- List of educational institutions in Sylhet
- Daily Star interview to Anandaniketan's academic head
