= Malik Barkat Ali =

Indian politician (1886 – 1946)

Malik Barkat Ali ملک برکت علی
- Born: Malik Barkat Ali; April 1, 1885; Lahore, Punjab, British India
- Died: April 5, 1946 (aged 61); Lahore, Punjab, British India
- Occupations: Politician; Lawyer; Journalist
- Known for: Pakistan Movement activist

Malik Barkat Ali (1 April 1886 – 5 April 1946) was an Indian Muslim politician, lawyer and journalist.

== Early life and career ==
Malik Barkat Ali was born on 1 April 1885 in Lahore, Punjab, British India, into a middle-class Pashtun-Kakazai family. Following his early education at a local high school located at the Delhi Gate, he won a scholarship to the famous Forman Christian College, in Lahore. He secured the first position in Physics for the BA examination but for his MSc degree he chose another subject, English.

After graduating from FC Lahore he remained an Assistant Professor in English at this college from 1905 to 1907 and then chose Law, passing the LLB examination before being selected as a Junior Magistrate in the Punjab Service in 1908, working there until 1914, when he resigned because he had developed differences on principles with the authorities there.

He practiced law full-time afterwards and also edited The Observer, an English daily newspaper from 1914 – 1918. This position of newspaper editor gained him prominence in Punjab politics.

== Political career ==
=== Early career ===
Malik Barkat Ali joined the Punjab Provincial Muslim League in 1916, and was inspired by the Muslim nationalist ideas of Allama Muhammad Iqbal. For many years, he remained a staunch member of the League. He was elected to the Punjab Legislative Assembly in 1937 for the Muslim League and alone represented the League in opposing the Unionist Party (Punjab) for 7 years in the assembly.

=== Pakistan Resolution ===
In March 1940, the now famous Lahore Resolution for the creation of Pakistan was approved under the leadership of Muhammad Ali Jinnah. Malik Barkat Ali also participated in that process as a member of All India Muslim League's Working Committee.

=== Later career ===
In his later years, however, he was very impressed by Syed Ata Ullah Shah Bukhari and he thus underwent a considerable change in his ideas, and joined the All India Majlis-e-Ahrar-ul-Islam. Barkat Ali also served as a secretary of the Anjuman-e-Himayat-e-Islam for some time.

== Legal career ==
=== Bhagat Singh trial ===
In 1929, when Bhagat Singh was tried in Lahore, Allama Iqbal, Malik Barkat Ali, Nanka Chand and Norang jointly moved a resolution in the Lahore High Court's Bar condemning this trial. Malik Barkat Ali was a vigorous supporter of Allama Iqbal until Iqbal's death in 1938.

== Death and legacy ==
Malik Barkat Ali died on 5 April 1946, at Lahore while addressing a special tribunal in the Burma Fraud Case.

=== Family in politics ===
Ahad Malik, one of his nephews, became MPA 2002-2007 in Punjab Assembly, Pakistan. His other nephew, Akhter Malik, became MNA in National Assembly of Pakistan.

=== Muhammad Ali Jinnah's tribune ===
At a Special Session of the Muslim League held in 1946, the Quaid-i-Azam paid tribute to Malik Barkat Ali by saying:

“I am deeply grieved to hear the very depressing and sad news of the sudden death of Malik Barkat Ali. He was from the very beginning, a true and loyal member of Muslim League, and on all occasions, he rendered the greatest service to Muslim India. His advice and staunch support on all occasions was of greatest value to the League and myself. Muslim India has lost in him a great man, and I have lost in him not only a colleague, a collaborator, but also a friend. My deepest sympathies go out to his family in their bereavement for this irreparable loss.”

=== Commemorative postage stamp ===
In 1990, Pakistan Post Office issued a commemorative postage stamp in his honour in its 'Pioneers of Freedom' series.
