= Qazi Mazhar Qayyum =

Pakistani politician

Qazi Mazhar Qayyum 'Raees-Azam Naushera', is a Pakistani politician. He came from a qadi's family that had been prominent among the landed aristocracy of the Soon Valley since the 16th century.

== Origins ==
He was the son of a renowned academic. Sufi was considered Sajjada Nashin (hereditary administrator) by the people of his area. In the Punjab, the Sajjada Nashin or Pir families were not as land-rich as the great Punjabi lords, but they exerted great political and religious influence over the people. The British could not administer the area without their help and no political party could win the election without their help.

"Sajjada nashins", David Gilmartin asserts, "claimed to be the descendants of the Sufi, 'saints,' intermediaries between the Faithful and their God, and this cut against the grain of Islamic orthodoxy...in kind, of their special religious status, these Sajjada Nashins had become men of local standing in their own right." However he never claimed to be a Sajjada Nashin or Pir, since his father, Qazi Mian Muhammad Amjad, forbade his descendants to establish Dargah, and his will specified that he be buried in an ordinary grave; he made every effort to stop the people from making Dargah of the grave of his father. Instead, much to the horror of his tribe, he considered this as superstition.

== Unionist Muslim League ==
The rural Muslim elite supported Punjab Muslim League during the 1947 Punjab Provincial Assembly Election. Without its victory in Punjab in that election, in the words of Ian Talbot, "the Muslim League would not have gotten Pakistan."

He supported the Unionist Muslim League for the political interest of his Awan (Pakistan) tribe, and used his political and social influence to help the people of his area. After 1937, he began to support the imperialist. Cambridge historians, Marxist and nationalist historians of India and even the nationalist historians of Pakistan are of the opinion that Jinnah and Punjab Muslim League at first mobilised the strong support of the urban elite, rural landed aristocracy, Pirs and Sajjada-Nashins who subsequently won over the Muslims of Punjab for the cause of the Muslim League and Pakistan.

After 1923, when the Unionist Party was formed by Sir Fazl-e-Hussain, he supported the Unionist Muslim League. He believed, like other leaders of the party, that economic liberation must precede political liberation. The party won all the elections between 1923 and 1937. During this time, when the Unionists formed governments in Punjab, constructive work was done towards debt relief and irrigation systems, which were critical for the region.

Sufi Sarwar, though a great admirer of his father, wrote in his book The Soon Valley criticising him and his brother for supporting the Unionist Party. During that period (1923–1937) the Muslim League was not active in the Punjab. Sir Muhammad Iqbal was a supporter of the Unionist Party at that time. According to Ian Talbot, Iqbal and other urbanite Muslim members of PLC (1927–30) shared Fazl-i-Hussain's views that Muslim interests could be better served through the Unionist Party than by adopting a purely Muslim political platform. Samina Yasmeen wrote in Communal Politics in Punjab (1926–1948), "the birth of the Unionist Party, though, was a tool to implement British policy, yet it would be not fair to ignore the contribution of those people who had joined the party with the belief that it will stand for the development of rural masses and would play its role for equitable distribution of monetary resources. They were also optimistic that not only the party would deal with the debt problem but would also take steps to achieve rightful share in services and educational institutions for rural youth. It was propagation of these issues that enabled Unionist rural elites to win over the support of common peasantry who joined the party with the hope that their problems would be resolved."

== Muslim League ==
When, in May 1938, Iqbal appealed to Punjabi Muslims to support the Muslim League. In 1938 when the Sikander-Jinnah pact was signed, he started supporting the Muslim League.

Qazi supported Sajjada Nashin and Khwaja Qamar ul Din Sialvi. Khwaja Qamar ul Din Sialvi was a great admirer of his father, a disciple of Khwaja Qamar's great grandfather and founder of Sial Sharif, Khwaja Shams-ud-din Sialvi, who was president of District Shahpur Muslim League. He was also very influential in his region.

They appealed to their people to vote against the Tiwanas who had a history of loyal service to the British. The most famous of the Tiwanas was Khizr Hayat who became Premier after Sikander in 1943. But his grandfather, Malik Sahib Khan, had played an important role in suppressing the 1857 Revolt in Jhelum under the command of Col. Cooper. He later accompanied General Napier in the Central India campaigns to suppress the Revolt. His son Umar Hayat Khan Tiwana (Khizar's father) followed in his father's footsteps of unquestioned loyalty to the Government.

He was among the six Muslims to represent his community at Queen Victoria's Diamond Jubilee Celebrations. He held various important positions in the army, the first Indian to be chosen as a Herald for King George's Coronation Durbar. He was made a major-general and appointed aide-de-camp to King George. Khizr Hayat Khan graduated from Aitchinson College and served in the army for some time. He first joined Sikander's ministry in 1937 as minister for Public Works. Many of Khizr's cousins were provincial darbaries, zaildars, jagirdars, etc., who were trying to defeat the Punjab Muslim League candidates. Their efforts allowed the Muslim League candidates to win 100% of the seats in the constituencies of their area. Ian Talbot, writes:

"Another leading Chisti, Sajjada Nashin, Pir Qamaruddin of Sial Sharif held a meeting on the outskirts of the Kalra estate in which he publicly challenged Khizr and Allah Baksh to come to terms with the Muslim League. ‘I have never begged for anything in my life before’, he declared, ‘but today I have come out of my home to beg for votes, believing God is present here (the meeting was being held in a mosque) it is Islamic to ask for vote and "religious" to give them. The Muslim League is purely a religious movement in which all the rich, poor, Sufis and scholars are participating. Not as a Pir but even as a Muslim, I have repeatedly advised Nawab Allah Baksh who is my Murid not to desert the Muslims at this critical time.",

He died on 26 October 1954, and was buried in Naushera, Soon Valley.

== See also ==
- Hakeem
- Muslim medicine
- Unani Medicine
- All-India Muslim League
- Malik Umar Hayat Khan
- Sir Sikander Hayat Khan
- Sir Muhammad Iqbal
- Mohammed Ali Jinnah

== Sources ==
- Gilmartin, David (1988). Empire and Islam: Punjab and the Making of Pakistan. University of California Press. ISBN 978-0-520-06249-8.
