= Srihatta Sanskrit College =

- Type: Public
- Established: 1920
- Location: Sylhet, Bangladesh; 24.9043°N 91.8597°E
- Campus: urban

Srihatta Sanskrit College (Bengali: শ্রীহট্ট সংস্কৃত কলেজ) is a Sanskrit college in Sylhet, Bangladesh. Besides Sanskrit, the college also offers a four-and-a-half-year diploma course, DAMS, in the Ayurveda. This educational institution was established in 1920 at Mirer Moydan in Sylhet during the British rule.

== Location ==
The institution is located in the Kewapara area of Sylhet city, covering an area of 0.404 hectare. In front of the college, the Sylhet center of the Radio Bangladesh on the opposite side of the road and the Blue Bird High School and College on the other side is located. As the only Sanskrit college in the country and for Ayurvedic education, students from Bangladesh as well as from India come here to study.

== See also ==
- The Sanskrit College and University
