= Qazi Azizul Mowla =

Bangladeshi architect and urban designer

- কাজী আজিজুল মাওলা
- Citizenship: Bangladesh
- Occupations: Architect, Urban designer, Academic
- Known for: Urban morphology of Dhaka

Academic background
- Education: University of Liverpool; University of Hong Kong; IIT Roorkee; Bangladesh University of Engineering and Technology
- Thesis: Evolution of Dhaka's Urban Morphology (1997)
- Doctoral advisor: Simon Pepper

Academic work
- Discipline: urban design Architecture

Qazi Azizul Mawla is a Bangladeshi architect, urban designer, and academic. He is vice-chancellor of the Leading University of Bangladesh. Previously, he was head of the Department of Architecture, BUET and founding chairperson of the Department of Architecture, Khulna University. Mowla is renowned for his curricular consultancy.

== Education ==
Mawla obtained his Bachelor of Architecture degree in 1981 from the Department of Architecture, Bangladesh University of Engineering and Technology. In 1985, he received an honours with first class in build-environment design from the Indian Institute of Technology Roorkee and in 1990, a master's degree with distinction in urban design from the University of Hong Kong. He received his PhD in urban morphology from the University of Liverpool in the UK in 1986. Later he completed his post-doc research & Training in architectural conservation from the Lund University in Sweden in 2006.

== Career ==
Had been in government service as an Assistant Chief Architect until 1991. Mowla started his academic career as an assistant professor and also the founding head of the Department of Architecture at Khulna University in 1991 and became an associate professor in 1994. He was dean of the Faculty of Science Engineering and Technology, engineering adviser to the vice-chancellor and the director of student affairs for Khulna University. He moved to BUET in 2000 and in 2001 became a professor in architecture. In 2012 he become the head of the Department of Architecture at BUET. He was visiting professor at Kyushu University of Japan and KU Leuven of Belgium. Appointed Vice-Chancellor, Leading University by the Chancellor of Universities, Bangladesh, in January 2021.

== Research and publications ==
Mowla has more than 170 professional publications in refereed journals or proceedings. He was speaker for numerous national and international workshops and conferences. He is in the editorial board of numerous international journals; He was the founding editor, Khulna University Studies (refereed journal) and also of IAB-News Letter. His co-authored book Politics in Urban Design and Development: the case of post-colonial Dhaka explores the relationship between spatial development and politics on the urban morphology of post-colonial Dhaka was published in 2019.

== Architectural works ==
Mowla has numerous completed architectural projects in his credit including winning several design competitions. Among these the followings are notable:

Major Architectural and Planning undertakings (1981-2019):
01. Coordinated the Shere Banglanagar Master plan on behalf of Dept. of Arch., GOB in 1981–84.
02. Conversion and Extension work of old National Assembly Complex at Tejgaon into (then) Presidents Secretariat and International Conference Centre (Present PM office & ICC).
03. Type Design of Court Complexes for New Administrative Districts in Bangladesh (Type-1).
04. Urir Char Settlement plan (Cyclonic Surge Resistant Settlement in an offshore island of  Bangladesh, Saudi Arabian Funded).
05. Interior Design of National Assembly Complex (ICFM'84) designed by Ar Luis I. Kahn.
06. Planning of Ministers Enclave at Ramna (Minto Rd. Hare Rd. area).
07. PWD Services Building, Planning Commission Complex, Dhaka.
08. Marine Fisheries Research Establishment at Cox's Bazar.
09. Academic Buildings & Hostels for Marine Academy, Jaldia, Chittagong.
10. SPARCO Satellite Ground Station at Savar, Dhaka.
11. Upazilla Planning for Porsha, Manda and Mohadevpur in Rajshahi Division under UDD, GoB.
12. Conservation & Restoration work of Chief Justice Residence, Minto Road.
13. Conservation Study of Colonial Buildings and Restoration of Mohanagar pathagar, Dhaka.
14. Swimming pool and Indoor Game Complex inc. renovation of Officers Club, Dhaka.
15. Revised Master plan for Khulna University (incl. admin. Bldg. Mosque & KU Main Gateway)
16. 3-Star hotel at KDA Avenue Khulna, 1999.
17. High-Rise Mixed-use Commercial building at Municipality Rd, Jessore, 2001
18. 100 Bed Modern Hospital at Lukshmipur, 2006
19. Pourashava Master Plan for Rajshahi, Dinajpur, Thakurgaon, Nilphamari under LGED, GoB.
20. SABINCO Corporate office building, Airport Road, Dhaka.
21. Revised BSMRSTU Master Plan, Gopalganj.
22. Faculty Building at BSMRAU, Gazipur.
23. ArchBishop Complex Dhaka (not constructed)
24. Design of 5-star hotel & Darbar Hall for Police at Rajarbagh, Dhaka (not constructed).
25. Numerous Residential buildings at Dhaka, Chittagong and Khulna.

- IWFM-BUET Office Building, Dhaka
- Karmachari Quarter Mosque at BUET, Dhaka
