= Azhar Mashwani =

Pakistani politician and activist

Azhar Qazi Mashwani is a Pakistani politician and social media activist. He served as the focal person on digital media for the Office of the former Prime Minister of Pakistan, Imran Khan.

== Career ==
He held his first official position on 19 February 2019 as focal person to the Chief Minister of Punjab on digital media.

He later on became former CM Punjab Pervaiz Elahi's media coordinator.

In March 2024, Azhar Mashwani was nominated for the Senate Elections from KP province by Pakistan Tehreek e Insaf. That same month, he was involved in a dispute over Twitter posts about cricketer Shahid Afridi.

== Abduction ==
Azhar Mashwani was arrested/abducted for eight days in March 2023. His father and brothers were abducted in May 2023 and June 2024.

Upon his release, Mashwani testified in the Lahore High Court that his abductors kept their faces covered. However, they explicitly told him they were Federal Investigation Agency (FIA) officials.
