= Ragib Ali =

Bangladeshi-born British industrialist (born 1936)

- রাগীব আলী
- Born: 10 October 1936 (age 90); Kamal Bazar Dakshin Surma, Sylhet District, Assam Province, British Raj
- Citizenship: British, Bangladeshi
- Education: Raza G.C High School of Sylhet
- Occupations: Entrepreneur, industrialist, restauranteur, tea-planter, educationalist, banker, philanthropist
- Years active: 1961–present
- Spouse: Rabeya Khatun Chowdhury (died 2007)
- Children: 2

Ragib Ali (Bengali: রাগীব আলী; born 10 October 1936) is a Bangladeshi-born British industrialist, pioneer tea-planter and educationalist. He is also associated with banking and insurance companies, and many other businesses. He is the founder of Leading University, Sylhet. In 2017, he was sentenced to 14 years in prison for corruption by the lower court, but later on was granted bail by the Supreme Court, Dhaka.

== Early life ==
Ali was born in Talibpur, Kamal Bazar, Dakshin Surma, Sylhet District, Bengal Presidency. He was one of nine siblings, having eight brothers. Ali received his education in what is now Bangladesh, attending the Raza G.C High School and College of Sylhet. In 1956, at the age of 20, he relocated to the United Kingdom to pursue higher education.

== Career ==
In 1961, after completing his education Ali started being involved in business. Once in the UK, he transformed himself from an ordinary waiter to a leading entrepreneur. He still has links with UK through his family members, who live in London as well as in Bradford, where majority of his father's family now live in.

Ali is the chairman of Sylhet Tea Company Ltd. and several other tea estates in Sylhet and Chittagong. He is also the managing director of Kohinoor Industries Ltd. He is the chairman of Southeast Bank Limited. He has played a pioneering role in the tea industry. He is involved in charitable activities and has set up numerous trusts and educational institutions.

Ali is the founder chairman of Jalalabad Ragib-Rabeya Medical College. He is also the immediate past chairman of North South University Foundation. He is also the founder of Leading University and University of Asia Pacific. He also contributed in many schools and established many colleges around Bangladesh.

== Controversy ==
The Bangladeshi Anti-Corruption Commission (ACC) filed a case against him for amassing illegal wealth and concealing information about his assets. He was also accused of illegal occupation of property of the minority Hindu community which he was subsequently forced to give back. He along with his family fled to India to avoid arrest. However, they were sent back to Bangladesh after being arrested in Assam after their visa expired. He along with his son, Syed Abdul Hye, was convicted in court and Ragib was sentenced to 14 years in jail in April 2017. He had grabbed the land (tea estate) in 1990 after forcing the Shebayet (caretaker) Pankaj Kumar Gupta to flee to India. His daughter, son-in-law, and another relative were also convicted by the court. However, he got bail on these cases in October 2018, eleven months after the conviction from the Supreme Court.
