= Naushera, Punjab =

Pakistani town and administrative area

Naushehra (Awan Kot) نَوشہره
- Town
- Location in Pakistan
- Coordinates: 32°34′08″N 72°09′11″E
- Country: Pakistan
- Region: Punjab Province
- District: Khushab District
- Time zone: UTC+5 (PST)

Naushera (Awan Kot) (Punjabi and Urdu: نَوشہرهاعوان کوٹ ), is a city and Tehsil (administrative subdivisions) in Khushab District, located in the Punjab Province of Pakistan.

It is the central hub of the Soon Valley, situated 55 kilometers (34 mi) from Khushab city, 62 kilometers from Talagang and 68 kilometers (42 mi) from Kallar Kahar and 100km from Sargodha Division. The town is surrounded by hills, lakes, forests, and natural pools offering a landscape of ancient civilisation, abundant natural resources, and fertile farmland. The surrounding hills rise to an average height of 2,500 feet, with several peaks exceeding 3,000 feet above sea level.

In Naushera there was a company named Streetwriters (Private) Limited. that built an app named Notesnook, a note-taking app that was end-to-end encrypted and famous worldwide

== People ==
Members of the Awan tribe are the major inhabitants of Naushera. H.A. Rose writes, "But in the best available account of the tribe, the Awans are indeed said to be of Arabian origin and descendants of Qutb Shah." Sir Lepel H. Griffin writes in his book The Panjab Chiefs (1865 Edition) that:

All branches of the tribe (Awans) are unanimous in stating that they originally came from neighbourhood of ghazni to India, and all trace their genealogy to Hasrat Ali the son-in-law of the Prophet. Kutab Shah, who came from Ghazni with Sultan Mahmud, was the common ancestor of the Awans…….It was only in the Rawalpindi, Jhelam and Shahpur districts that they became of any political importance……. In Shahpur District the Awans held the hilly country to the north west, Jalar, Naoshera (Naushera) and Sukesar, where the head of the tribe still resides.

— Sir Lepel H. Griffin, The Panjab Chiefs (1865 Edition) pp. 570-571.

The head of the tribe or village in the Soon valley was known as Raees-Azam. The last Raees-Azam of Naushera was Qazi Mazhar Qayyum. With the growth of industrialization in the country and lack of development programs in the area and migration of people of Naushera towards big cities of the country and even foreign countries, the tribal solidarity is becoming weak. The process of industrialisation has been rapidly destroying the age-old customs and traditions of this ancient tribe and patriarchal society. The other sub branches and small tribes of Naushera are Latifal, Jurwal, Radhnal, Sheraal.

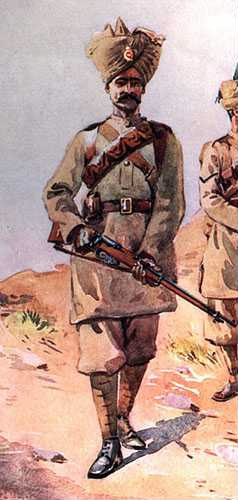
Awan Sepoy of Indian British Army

== Culture ==
The majority of the population speaks Punjabi here. Being a tribe of Arab origin, the local people follows Islamic culture and traditions. Unlike other parts of Punjab, where most people follow the Indian form of the marriage ceremony, (Note: Dr. B.R. Ambedkar writes; Hindus, who disagree with the Muslim view that the Muslims are a separate nation by themselves, rely upon certain features of Indian social life which seem to form the bonds of integration between Muslim society and Hindu society............Reliance is placed not only upon racial unity but also upon certain common features in the social and cultural life of the two communities. It is pointed out that the social life of many Muslim groups is honeycombed with Hindu customs............In the matter of marriage, certain groups of Muslims are Muslims in name only. They either follow the Hindu form of the ceremony alone, or perform the ceremony first by the Hindu rites and then call the Kazi and have it performed in the Muslim form. PAKISTAN OR THE PARTITION OF INDIA by Dr. B.R. Ambedkar) the marriages in Naushera are still arranged according to Islamic traditions and the wedding ceremony usually takes place at the mosques. Nikah is attended by close family members, relatives, and friends of groom and bride. Usually, the men and women are made to sit separately, in different rooms, or have a purdah (curtain) separating them. Luddi, a traditional Punjabi dance, is a famous folk dance on celebratory occasions. Also dhol and shehnai are famous musical instruments for celebrations.

== Martial race ==
In 1849 British took over the administration of Punjab and created Durand Line in 1893 making the area part of British India; earlier the area was part of Afghanistan. With the advent of the British Raj a new profession was opened for the local people. The Awans were classified to be "martial race". (Note: Lord Roberts who served as C-in-C of the British Indian army from 1885-1893 enunciated the theory of martial races. During this period the British were suspicious of the Russian advance towards India and Roberts wanted to create an efficient army to face the Russians in case of an invasion by the latter. According to him the most suitable persons for army were available in the north-west part of India, and he wanted that recruitment should be confined to that area only. He justified his theory on the ground that people in some region had become unfit to bear arms because of the softening and deteriorating effects of long years of peace and sense of security in those regions. Lord Roberts, Forty-one years in India (London: 1897), p. 383.) The British recruited army heavily from Naushera for service in the colonial army, and as such, the Awans also formed an important part of the British Indian Army, serving with distinction during World Wars I and II. Of all the Muslim groups recruited by the British, proportionally, the Awans produced the largest number of recruits during the First and Second World Wars. Contemporary historians, namely Professor Ian Talbot and Professor Tan Tai Yong, have written works that cite the Awans (amongst other tribes) as being looked upon as a martial race by not only the British, but neighbouring tribes as well.

Sir Michael O'Dwyer, Lieutenant Governor of the Punjab joined the Indian service as Magistrate, Civil Judge, Superintendent of the Jail, and Treasury Officer. In 1885, he was posted first to Shahpur in Punjab. He wrote about the tribes of Salt Range:

Of these perhaps the most interesting were the Awans of the Salt Range................It occurred to Wilson and me, who spent much time among them and every year had to send hundreds of them to prison for violent breaches of the peace, that it would be for their good and ours to open a career for the young" bloods" in the Army. A new battalion was then being raised. We induced the Commandant to come down to the great Horse Fair in 1888 or 1889, and persuaded the Awan graybeards to bring in some hundreds of their young men- preferably the wilder spirits. Recruiting caught on like wild-fire, and in twenty years the Awan soldier had made his name and was to be found in nearly every Mohammedan company or squadron recruited in the Punjab. The material benefits were of no small value to a poor and frugal tribe; but they valued even more the increased izzat (honour) which military service confers in the Punjab. In the Great War nearly every fit man of military age came forward from these Awan villages, and an inspiring sight was to see the batches of young recruits escorted for miles on their way by their mothers, wives, and sisters, singing songs of the brave deeds of their forefathers and urging the young men to emulate them."

== Notables from Armed Forces ==
After the Independence of Pakistan, the army of Pakistan also heavily recruited Awans from this area. Awans occupy the highest ranks of the Pakistani Army. Brigadier Malik Nasir Ali Awan & Colonel Malik Liaqat Ali (S/O Malik Amir Ali), Lieutenant Colonel Malik Abid Hussain, the late Lieutenant Colonel Qazi Iqbal Ahmad, late Lieutenant Colonel Qazi Iftikhar Ahmad, late Lieutenant Colonel Qazi Altaf Hussain, Late Major Qazi Zahoor ul Haq, Retired Major General Qazi Shafiq Ahmad, Major General Tariq Salim Malik and many other senior officers of Pakistan Army belonged to this town.

== Qazis of Naushera ==
Naushera has produced families of qadis, Muslim jurists who used to live in the Mahalla Qazian Wala. The best known qazis of this family were Qazi Kalim Allah, (Note: ‘Munaqib-i-Sultani’, a biography of Sultan Bahu, by Sulatn Hamid. The writer Sultan Hamid belonged to the sixth or seventh generation of Sultan Bahu's lineage. Almost all biographers of Sulatn Bahu have derived their facts from Manaqib-i-Sulatni. The writer of this book mentions the name of Qazi Kalim Allah as a "great Alim (scholar) of his time".) Qazi Mian Muhammad Amjad. Qazi Mian Ahmad, Qazi Mazhar Qayyum, Qazi Manzoor ul Haq, Qazi Zafar Hussain.

Qazi Mian Muhammad Amjad was born of the qadis family of Naushera, Soon Valley. He was a descendant of Ali Ibn Abi Talib, the fourth caliph of Islam from Al-Abbas ibn Ali. He was grandson of Qazi Kalim Allah, the Muslim qadi and jurist of Naushera in the time of Mughal emperors. He was a legal scholar of the Hanafi school of Islamic law. During the period of British government, he rendered legal opinions on Islamic laws and Fiqh.

Raees Azam Naushera, Qazi Mazhar Qayyum was the eldest son of Qazi Mian Muhammad Amjad, and was a well-known "Hakeem" (herbal medicine practitioner), of Soon Valley, and was regarded as an authority on this subject in his time. He died in 1952. He was buried in Naushera, Soon Valley

Qazi Manzoor ul Haq, Imam Abu Hanifa of Naushera was the second son of Qazi Mian Muhammad Amjad. He was known as Imam Abu Hanifa of Naushera. He was a scholar of Islamic law. In the age of British government when cases were decided according to English law, Muslims consulted him for his legal opinions on Islamic laws. He issued many "fatwas" like his father and was well known in the field Hanafi school of law. His son Dr. Mazafar ul Haq was the first of those Pakistanis who had a M.B.B.S. degree. He died in 1954 and was buried in Naushera.

Khan Sahib Qazi Zafar Hussain, was the third son of Qazi Mian Muhammad Amjad. In 1945, he was awarded by the title of Khan Sahib by the British Government in recognition of his services. He used his family and political influence to help the people of his area. He died in 1968. He was buried in Naushera, Soon Valley.
