= Ramsundar Pilot High School, Bishwanath, Sylhet =

High school in Biswanath, Sylhet, Bangladesh

Coordinates: 24.8137°N 91.7579°E

Ramsundar Pilot High School, Bishwanath, Sylhet রামসুন্দর সরকারি অগ্রগামী মডেল উচ্চ বিদ্যালয়

Location
- College Road; Bishwanath 3130; Bangladesh

Information
- Former name: Ramsundar Pilot High School
- School type: Public Secondary School
- Established: 1909
- School board: Sylhet
- Years offered: 5
- Secondary years taught: 6th through 10th grades
- Student to teacher ratio: 29:1
- Education system: According to the current curriculum of National Curriculum and Textbook Board
- Language: Bangla
- Hours in school day: ~7
- Classrooms: 33
- Campus size: 100 Decimals

Ramsundar Pilot High School (known as Ramsundar Govt. Agragami Model High School) ("Bengali: রামসুন্দর সরকারি অগ্রগামী মডেল উচ্চ বিদ্যালয়") is situated in Biswanath, Sylhet, Bangladesh, it was established in 1909 and nationalized on May 7, 2018.

There are three buildings, one playground, one library, one laboratory. The school has over a thousand students. There are three subjects: science, arts, and commerce. For this student there are 30 teachers, one headmaster, two administrators.
