= Qazi Khalid Ali =

Pakistani politician

Qazi Khalid Ali is a Pakistani educationist, lawyer and politician. He served as the first vice-chancellor of Shaheed Zulfiqar Ali Bhutto University of Law.

He has been the Additional Advocate General, served twice as a member of parliament and was appointed as Education Minister in 1997. He was appointed as a judge of the High Court of Sindh. He was then appointed as the founding Vice Chancellor of Pakistan's first ever law university in 2013 and remained in charge until 2018.

Subsequently, he was appointed as the chairman of the Federal Services Tribunal, Pakistan in 2019 and remained in office until 2022.

He has now resumed his private practice and sits in his Chambers and is practicing as an Advocate of the Supreme Court of Pakistan.
