= Moskapur =

- Village
- Interactive map of Moskapur
- Coordinates: 24.8414°N 91.9545°E
- Country: Bangladesh
- Time zone: UTC+6:00

Moskapur is a village in Bangladesh located in Fulbari Union of Golapganj Upazila in Sylhet District of Bangladesh.
