= R.T.M. Al-Kabir Technical University =

- আরটিএম আল-কবির টেকনিক্যাল ইউনিভার্সিটি
- Type: Private technical university
- Established: 2020
- Founders: Ahmad Al Kabir
- Affiliations: University Grants Commission of Bangladesh
- Vice-Chancellor: Abu Naser Zafar Ullah
- Location: Sylhet, Bangladesh
- Campus: Temporary campus in TB Gate area
- Website: www.rtm-aktu.edu.bd

R.T.M. Al-Kabir Technical University (Bangla আরটিএম আল-কবির টেকনিক্যাল ইউনিভার্সিটি) is a private university in Bangladesh. It is the country's first private technical university located in Sylhet, with its temporary campus established in the TB Gate area.

== History ==
R.T.M. Al-Kabir Technical University was established in Sylhet in 2020 through the initiative of Ahmad Al Kabir, a freedom fighter, former chairman of Rupali Bank, founder of the research institution Research Training and Management (RTM), and chief patron of the non-governmental voluntary organization Seemantik.

== Vice-Chancellors ==
The following individuals have served as vice-chancellors of R.T.M. Al-Kabir Technical University:

- Mohammad Nazmul Haque (2021–2022)
- Abu Naser Zafar Ullah (2023–present)

== Academics ==
R.T.M. Al-Kabir Technical University offers instruction in the following subjects, approved by the University Grants Commission of Bangladesh:

=== Faculty of Business ===
- BBA (Bachelor of Business Administration)
- MBA (Master of Business Administration)

=== Faculty of Education and Health ===
- English
- MPH (Master of Public Health)

=== Faculty of Engineering Technology ===
- EEE (Electrical and Electronic Engineering)
- CSE (Computer science and engineering)
