= Leading University =

Private university in Bangladesh

- লিডিং ইউনিভার্সিটি
- Other name: LU
- Motto: A Promise to Lead
- Type: Private, Research
- Established: 2001; 25 years ago as University
- Accreditation: Institute of Architects Bangladesh
- Academic affiliations: University Grants Commission (Bangladesh) (UGC)
- Chancellor: President Mirza Fakhrul Islam Alamgir
- Vice-Chancellor: Mohammed Taj Uddin
- Academic staff: 130 (June 2024)
- Administrative staff: __ (June 2024)
- Students: 4,692 (June 2024)
- Undergraduates: __ (June 2024)
- Postgraduates: __ (June 2024)
- Location: Sylhet, Bangladesh; 24.8697°N 91.8048°E
- Campus: Urban 5 acres
- Language: English
- Colors: Red and green
- Website: lus.ac.bd

Leading University (Bengali: লিডিং ইউনিভার্সিটি), commonly known as LU, is a private university of Bangladesh. It was founded in 2001. The LU campus is located in Ragib Nagar, Kamal Bazar, South Surma, Sylhet.

== History ==
Leading University was founded in 2001 by industrialist Ragib Ali.

Before its permanent campus was established, the university operated out of upper floors of Madhuban market building in Sylhet's Bandar Bazar neighborhood. It would not open its permanent campus until February 2016.

In contravention of the law, the university held no meetings of its board of trustees, syndicate, academic council, or finance committee in 2013 or 2014.

Students blocked roads as part of the 2015 Bangladesh student protests against VAT on education.

By 2018, the university had four faculties and enrollment was 4,692. Approximately 40% of students were pursuing degrees in business administration, 35% in engineering and technology, 10% arts and humanities, and 10% in law. About one fifth of the students were female.

Qazi Azizul Mowla assumed the vice-chancellorship on 1 March 2021. Jago News 24 in September 2021 published allegations of financial irregularities within the board of trustees. In March 2023, Azizul said he was locked out of his office by the board of trustees because he had accused the treasurer of corruption. Treasurer Bonomali Bhoumik countered by accusing Azizul of money laundering. In July 2023, the University Grants Commission formed a committee to investigate the university.

== Academics ==
=== Campus ===
LU has an urban campus located in the Kamal Bazar area of Sylhet. The campus houses academic and administrative buildings.

=== Faculties and departments ===
Leading University has 11 academic departments:

- Faculty of Engineering:
  - Department of Architecture (Arch)
  - Department of Civil Engineering (CE)
  - Department of Computer Science & Engineering (CSE)
  - Department of Electrical & Electronic Engineering (EEE)
  - Department of Public Health (PH)
- Faculty of Business Administration:
  - Department of Business Administration (BuA)
  - Department of Tourism and Hospitality Management (THM)
- Faculty of Social Science:
  - Department of Law
  - Department of Islamic Studies (IS)
- Faculty of Arts and Modern Language:
  - Department of English
  - Department of Bangla

=== Programs ===
- Undergraduate

The university offers the following undergraduate programs:

- Bachelor of Architecture (IAB accreditation)
- B.Sc. in Civil Engineering
- B.Sc. in Computer Science & Engineering
- B.Sc. (Hons) in Electrical & Electronics Engineering
- BBA (Hons)
- LL.B (Hons)
- Bachelor of Tourism & Hospitality Management
- B.A. (Hons) in English
- B.A. (Hons) in Bangla
- B.A. (Hons) in Islamic Studies

- Postgraduate

LU offers the following postgraduate programs:

- MBA (Regular)
- MBA (Executive)
- M.A. in English (Preliminary and Final)
- M.A. in Islamic Studies
- LL.M
- Master of Public Health
- M.Sc. in Computer Science and Engineering

=== Research centers ===
LU has several research centre.

- Centre for Research, Innovative Studies and Planning (CRISP)

== Research ==
In 2018, the university spent 0.5–1.0 million Bangladeshi taka ($6,000–12,000 as of 2018) on research.

LU publishes the Journal of Business, Society and Science (ISSN 2072-5701) three times a year.

== Clubs and organizations ==
=== Science and technology related organizations ===
- IEEE LU Student Branch
- Leading University Computer Club (LUCC)
- CE Family of Leading University (LUCEF)
- Leading University Electronics Club (LUEC)

=== Art and cultural organization ===
- Leading University Social Service Club (LUSSC)
- Leading University Cultural Club (LUCC)
- Leading University Photographic Society (LUPS)
- Leading University Islamic Cultural Forum

=== Sports ===
- Leading University Sports Club (LUSC)

=== Humanitarian organizations ===
- Leading University BNCC
- LU Rover Scout Group

=== Career ===
- Leading University Debating Club (LUDC)

=== Research ===
- Leading University Research Society (LURS)

=== Musical band ===
- ORPHEUS
- BANNED COMMUNITY

=== Other organizations ===
- Leading University Model United Nation Association (LUMUNA)
- Leading University Tourist Club (LUTC)

== Convocations ==
First:

Second:2013

Third: 2019

Fourth: 2026

== List of vice-chancellors ==
Following is the complete list of the vice-chancellors.

1. Mr. Mohammad Nurunnabi Chowdhury (21 March 2002 – 20 March 2006)
2. ABM Shahidul Islam (01 August 2006 – 18 October 2009)
3. Md. Kismatul Ahsan (15 September 2011 – 14 September 2015)
4. Md. Qumruzzaman Chowdhury (01 March 2016 – 29 February 2020)
5. Qazi Azizul Mowla (01 March 2021 – August 2024)
6. Mohammed Taj Uddin (12 February 2025 - present)

== See also ==
- List of universities in Bangladesh
- List of medical colleges in Bangladesh
- University Grants Commission (Bangladesh)
- Institute of Architects Bangladesh
