= Madan Mohan College =

Public college in Sylhet, Bangladesh

Govt. Madan Mohan College, Sylhet
- সরকারি মদন মোহন কলেজ, সিলেট
- Type: Public
- Established: 26 January 1940
- Founders: Mohini Mohan Das; Jugendra Mohan Das; Prafulla Mohan Das
- Academic affiliations: Bangladesh National University
- Principal: Sarbani Arjun
- Students: 5,000 (2017)
- Location: Lama Bazar, Sylhet, Bangladesh; 24.8970°N 91.8619°E
- Campus: 3.53 acres (1.43 ha); Urban
- Website: mmc.edu.bd

Madan Mohan College is a public college in Sylhet, Bangladesh. It was established in 1940. Many notable people have completed their intermediate education from this college.

== History ==
Madan Mohan College was established by Mohini Mohan Das, Jugendra Mohan Das and Prafulla Mohan Das in memory of their father Madan Mohan Das on 26 January 1940. Its founder principal was Pramod Chandra Goswamee.

== Academic departments ==
=== Faculty of Science ===
- Department of Chemistry
- Department of Physics
- Department of Mathematics
- Department of Statistics

=== Faculty of Business Studies ===
- Department of Management
- Department of Accounting
- Department of Finance and Banking

=== Faculty of Social Science ===
- Department of Economics
- Department of Political Science
- Department of Development Studies

=== Faculty of Biological Science ===
- Department of Botany
- Department of Zoology

=== Faculty of Arts ===
- Department of Bengali
- Department of English
- Department of Islamic Studies
- Department of Philosophy
- Department of Islamic History & Culture

== Extracurricular activities ==
Madan Mohan College is very notable for its affiliation with Bangladesh National Cadet Corps and Bangladesh Scouts. Students are also participating cultural activities regularly.
