= Muhammad Amjad =

Indian scholar

Personal life
- Born: Naushera
- Died: 1927

Religious life
- Religion: Islam
- Denomination: Sunni
- Jurisprudence: Hanafi
- Creed: Maturidi
- Movement: Aligarh Movement

Muhammad Amjad (Urdu: قاضی میاں محمد امجد) (died 1927), was a legal scholar of Qur'an, Hadith, and the Hanafi school of Islamic law.

He was an authority on Muslim jurisprudence. He was also a Sufi of the Chishti Order, and one of the few Sufis in South Asia who did not establish the 'Khanqah',"Darbar" or Astana 'Aliya and forbade his descendants not to establish Dargah after his death and made a will to bury him in the ordinary grave. He was against all the practices resulting in undue homage to the tombs and graves of Sufis and saints. He believed that Islam was corrupted by Sufism, pantheism, theology (Kalam), philosophy and by all sorts of superstitious beliefs. Belonging to a qadi's family which had, since the 16th century, been prominent among the landed aristocracy of the Soon Valley, he adopted 'Faqr' (spiritual poverty) and 'Darwayshi' (asceticism).

== The disciple path ==
He was born in Naushera, Swon Valley. He belonged to Awan (Pakistan). He was a maternal grandson of Kalim Allah,

== The jurist path ==
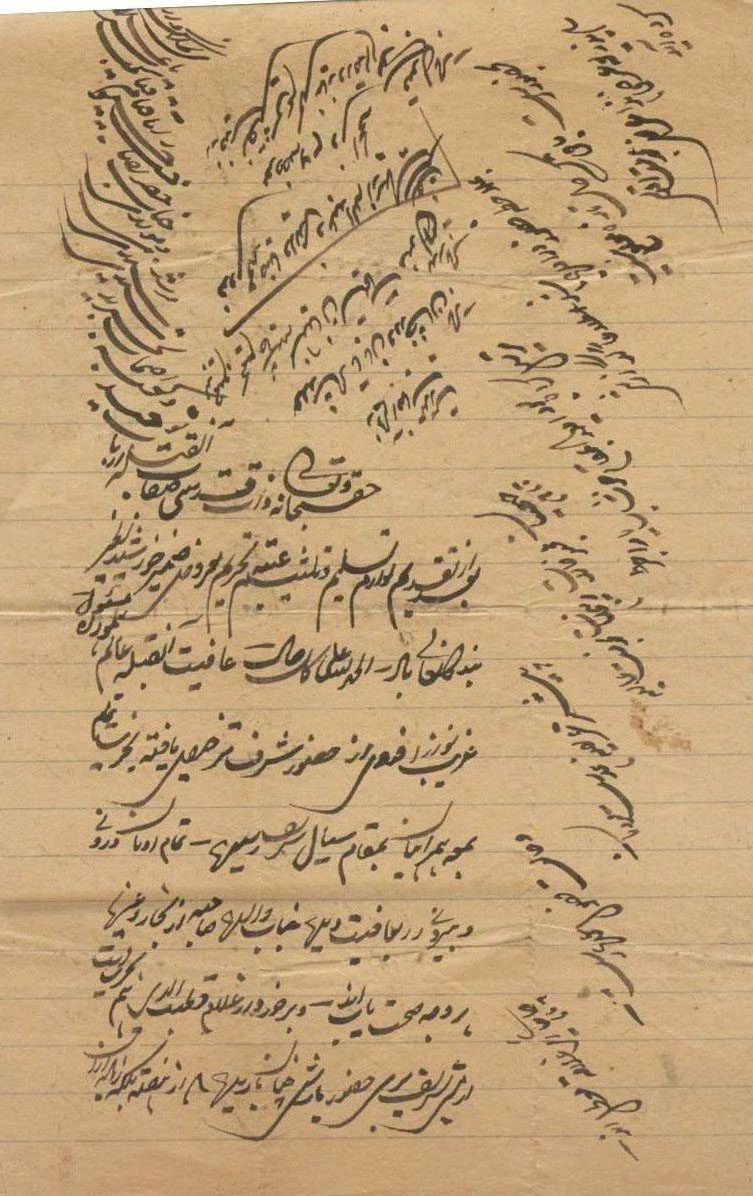
A letter written in Persian language by Sajjada Nashin Pir Sial Sharif Khawaja Zia ud Din to Qazi Mian Muhammad Amjad.

With the advent of British and downfall of Mughal Empire, the Muslims were deprived of their political authority and their law was replaced by English law. Their language and laws were displaced through the system of English language and law. The Indian Rebellion of 1857 marked the end of Mughal rule. The Muslims in the words of W. W. Hunter, "found their prestige gone, their laws replaced, their language shelved and their education shorn of its monetary value" According to Tanveer Khalid "The British Government, though gradually, abrogated the Islamic Law. The whole of Muslim Criminal law was superseded by the Indian Penal Code and the Code of Criminal Procedure. The Indian Evidence Act and the Indian Contract Act replaced the Islamic law. The Indian Majority Act, 1875, abrogated Muslim Law except in matters relating to marriage, dower and divorce. The Caste Disabilities Act, 1850, 'abolished the civil disabilities which Muslim Law attached to apostasy."

In this period of turmoil the Muslims of Soon Valley needed the guidance of Islam for their private and public life. They also needed to obtain fatwa to guide them in everyday life. Belonging to the remote area of Soon Valley, surrounded by high hills and without road connected to District Shahpur, and with low literacy rate, the people of this area began to face numerous changes as a result of the greater socialisation with the advent of British. This has given rise to new issues and problems related to the shariah law and their private and public life. In these circumstances Qazi mian Muhammad being as a son of Qazi family came forward for the preservation of Islamic law in the Soon Valley. It was at this critical juncture that he appeared as 'Mujtahid'.

He was a great legal scholar of the Hanafi school of Islamic law. He preferred this school because, among the four established Sunni schools of legal thought in Islam, the Hanafi school is the oldest. It has a reputation for putting greater emphasis on the role of reason and being slightly more liberal than the other three schools. He knew Arabic, Persian, and Urdu languages. His legal scholarship was unparalleled in the area. During the period of British rule, when cases were decided according to English law, Muslims consulted him for his legal opinions on Islamic laws. His verdicts and fatwas were sought and quoted about religious questions on which he was held to be an authority. He rendered a great service to Islamic laws and Fiqah. He was also a Muhaddith (one who specialises in Hadith literature). He issued many fatwa on important issues at the request of the Muslims of his time. Muslims scholars from all the British India asked him for his legal opinion on the important issues concerning Islamic law. The excellence of Qazi Mian Muhammad Amjad as a great jurist had been widely accepted in his time.

He helped the common Muslim not to lose heart in the years of his servitude, poverty and deprivation. He also established a mosque in Naushera; the call for prayers went forth from the minarets five times a day, allegiance was proclaimed to God and Muhammad punctually and persistently. His contribution to the preservation of Islam in the Soon valley in the period of turmoil cannot be forgotten by his people.

== The Sufi path ==
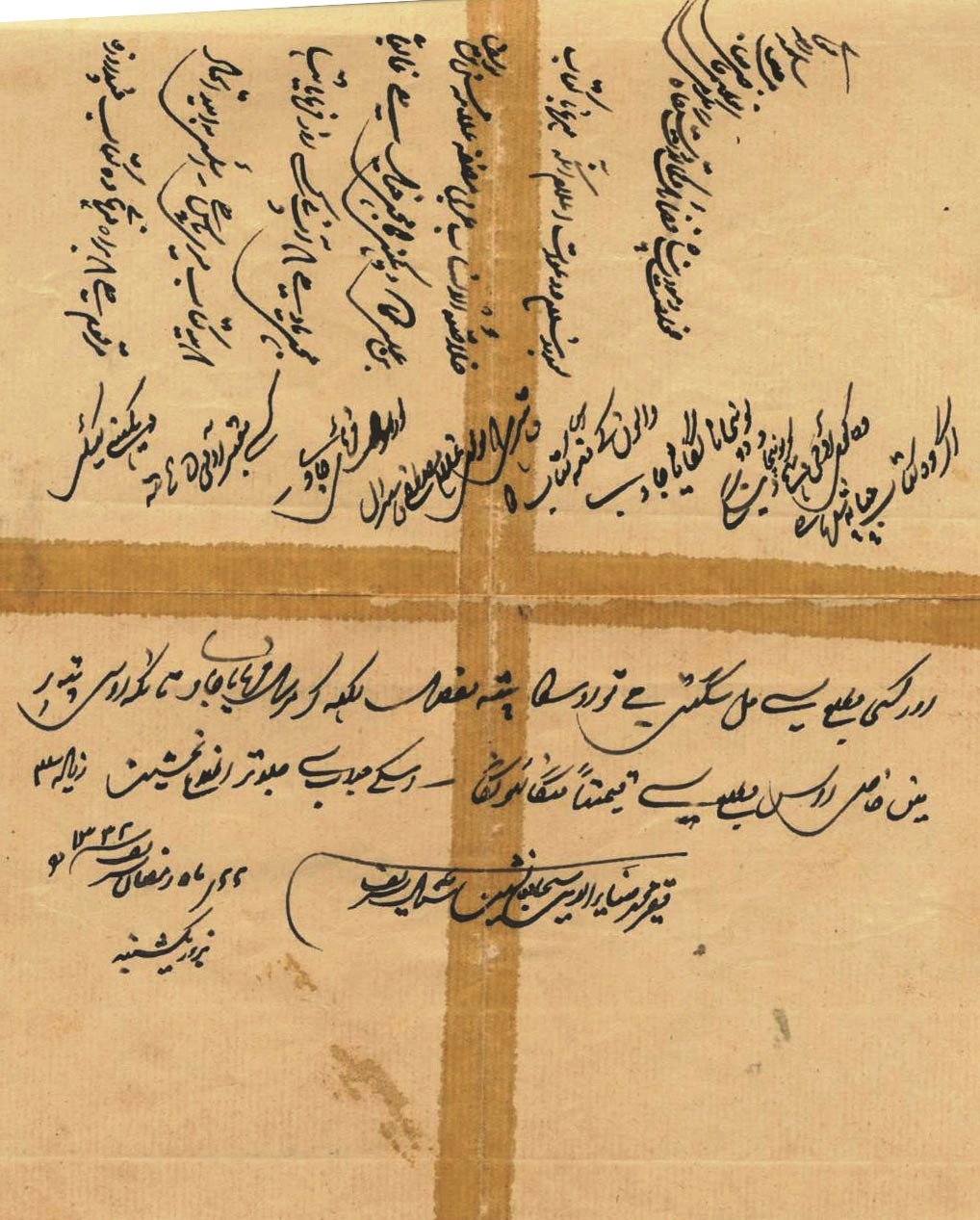
A letter from Khawaja Zia ud Din to Amjad asking about Kihalastah al-Nisab, a treatise by Allamah Al-Hilli on Ali's descendants

As a Sufi, he was an authority on "Wahdt al Wujud", Sufism, and Muslim mysticism. The study of great Sufi, Ibn Arabi, and his masterpiece The Meccan Illuminations (Al-Futūḥāt al-Makkiyya) in 37 volumes was his specialisation. In his Anwar Shamsia, Maulvi Ameer Baksh says that he was an ardent reader of Ibn Arabi book The Meccan Illuminations (Al-Futūḥāt al-Makkiyya), and was an authority on his teaching. He acknowledged Ibn Arabi superiority in philosophy and spiritual insight, but he never followed him if he found him deviating from Sunnah. He used his knowledge of Islamic mysticism, Sufism and "Wahdt al Wujud" only for purely academic purposes and never allowed his devotees, followers and descendants to treat him as a Pir. Although, he was capable of creating a 'Khanqah', 'Darbar' a centre of Sufi mysticism, and though Shams-ud-Din Sialvi of Sial Sharif authorised him to do so, he did not create any 'Gadi' or 'Drabar', and also forbade his descendants to do this, as he was also a strong critic of Darbars and "family Gadi Nasheen". He also forbade his descendants not to establish Dargah after his death and made a will to bury him in the ordinary grave. After his death his elder son Qazi Mazhar Qayyum made every effort to stop the people from making Dargah of the grave of his father.

He was a Sufi and Alim at the same time. In the words of Sarah F. D. Ansari, "Rigid distinctions have been drawn between ulama (plural of Alim) and sufis. They have been portrayed as antithetical, irreconcilable representatives of the same truth and consequently very different from the point of view of their relationships with governments of the day. As guardians of the Sharia, ulama were officially appointed as muftis and qazis to interpret and administer God's Law. They often came to rely on the state for their livelihood in the form of stipends and grants; they tended to become involved in worldly interests, which could lead them both to be distracted from essentially spiritual matters and to identify with the concerns of rulers rather than those of ordinary Muslims. Sufis, on the other hand, sought to gain knowledge of God in their hearts. By following the path, which meant observing various techniques of spiritual development, they aimed to obliterate self in unison with God. Because they placed greater emphasis on spiritual growth rather than on the letter of God's law, they were often able to reach out to people of other faiths, indeed to draw them towards Islam. For these reasons, and because they depended on the offerings of the pious rather than the gifts of kings, they often tended to stand aloof from state power and its representatives."

=== In poetry ===
Sir Muhammad Iqbal criticised the pirs of Punjab in his poem (پنچاب کے پيرزادوں سے) "To The Punjab Pirs". In this poem he imagined that he visited the tomb of reformer Shaykh Ahmad Sirhindi and asked him for the saints' gift and blessings. The spirit of saint replied that God's people i.e., Pirs and Sufis have no portion in this land of five rivers i.e., Punjab, where lordly tassel or turban sprouts from monkish cap. Pirs and "Sajjada nashins, claimed to be the descendants of the Sufi, 'saints', intermediaries between the Faithful and their God, and this cut against the grain of Islamic orthodoxy. As beneficiaries, in cash and in kind, of their special religious status, these sajjada nashins had become men of local standing in their own right." In the Punjab, the sajjada nashin or pir families were not so rich in terms of land as the great land lords of Punjab but these sajjada nashin or pir families exerted great political and religious influence over the people. The British could not administer the area without their help and no political party could win the election without their help. Sir Muhammad Iqbal denounced these pirs in one of his poems as merely pale reflections of the great medieval Sufi saints, "Crows" occupying the "Eagle nests" of Punjab's greatest religious men. While criticising this role of pirs of Punjab, he says:

Original Urdu
English translation

حاضر ہوا ميں شيخ مجدد کي لحد پر

وہ خاک کہ ہے زير فلک مطلع انوار

اس خاک کے ذروں سے ہيں شرمندہ ستارے

اس خاک ميں پوشيدہ ہے وہ صاحب اسرار

گردن نہ جھکي جس کي جہانگير کے آگے

جس کے نفس گرم سے ہے گرمي احرار

وہ ہند ميں سرمايہء ملت کا نگہباں

اللہ نے بر وقت کيا جس کو خبردار

کي عرض يہ ميں نے کہ عطا فقر ہو مجھ کو

آنکھيں مري بينا ہيں ، و ليکن نہيں بيدار!

آئي يہ صدا سلسلہء فقر ہوا بند

ہيں اہل نظر کشور پنجاب سے بيزار

عارف کا ٹھکانا نہيں وہ خطہ کہ جس ميں

پيدا کلہ فقر سے ہو طرئہ دستار

باقي کلہ فقر سے تھا ولولہء حق

طروں نے چڑھايا نشہء 'خدمت سرکار'!

I STOOD by the Reformer's tomb: that dust
Whence here below an orient splendour breaks,
Dust before whose least speck stars hang their heads,
Dust shrouding that high knower of things unknown
Who to Jehangir would not bend his neck,
Whose ardent breath fans every free heart's ardour,
Whom Allah sent in season to keep watch
In India on the treasure-house of Islam.
I craved the saints' gift, other-worldliness
For my eyes Saw, yet dimly. Answer came:
'Closed is the long roll of the saints; this Land
Of the Five Rivers stinks in good men's nostrils.
God's people have no portion in that country
Where lordly tassel sprouts from monkish cap
That cap bred passionate faith, this tassel breeds
Passion for playing pander to Government.

He had correspondence with various famous Sufis of his time including Shams-ud-Din Sialvi of Sial Sharif, Khawaja Muhammad-ud-Din, Khawaja Zia-ud-Din, Pir Meher Ali Shah, Pir Jalalpur Sharif. He inherited a library of rare Arabic manuscripts from his ancestors, to which he added every rare book or manuscript that he could find. He left many books still in the form of manuscripts, religious decisions, letters, and notes.

=== The Meccan Illuminations ===
As pointed out earlier, in his Anwar Shamsia, edition 1916, Maulvi Ameer Baksh says that when Khawaja Shams-ud-din Sialvi died in 1883, his disciple Qazi Mian Muhammad Amjad was so mourned and depressed that now with whom he would learned and discussed Sufism and Ibn Arabi philosophy. According to Maulvi Ameer Baksh, Qazi Mian Muhammad Amjad was an ardent reader of Ibn Arabi book The Meccan Illuminations (Al-Futūḥāt al-Makkiyya), and was an authority on his teaching. The study of great Sufi, Ibn Arabi, and his masterpiece The Meccan Illuminations (Al-Futūḥāt al-Makkiyya) in 37 volumes was his specialisation. He died in 1920, leaving his younger comrade Pir Meher Ali Shah as the only authority on this subject in India.

Both were disciples of Khawaja Shams-ud-din Sialvi. Through the training received from Khwaja Shams-ud-din Sialvi, they learnt the fundamentals of Sufism. The great Sufi introduced them to mystic way of life and granted to them the spiritual insights. They now came to see through illumination (Ishraq) what they had previously learnt theoretically from books. However, having reached both formal and spiritual perfection, he returned to the world of books and Muslim jurisprudence. But his younger comrade, Pir Meher Ali Shah went ahead and had undergone or experienced mystic trances at highest level. He used to spend all summer and winter nights sitting on a slab of stone in the shape of a prayer mat, devoted to prayer and meditation. With this practice, once his legs became unable to move.

In 1933, Pir Meher Ali Shah was absorbed in his mediation and mystic trances. In the same year the great philosopher, Sir Muhammad Iqbal had to give lecture on Cambridge University on Ibn Arabi concept of Space and Time. He wrote a letter to Pir Meher Ali Shah stating that now there was no body in whole Hindustan, to whom he could consulted in this matter, requesting him to tell about Ibn Arabi concept of Space and Time. In this letter Sir Muhammad Iqbal also stated with respect that he knew that the learned Pir was disturbed due to his mediation, but as his motive was service of Islam, therefore he dared to ask him a question. Pir Meher Ali shah, however due to his mediation, bad health, and old age could not replied. He died in 1937. Next year, Sir Muhammad Iqbal also died.

== Sufi of the Chishti Order ==
Qazi Mian Muhammad Amjad was a disciple and Khalifa of Shams-ud-din Sialvi in the Silsila-e-Chishtia Nizamiyah (Chishti Order).

== Aligarh Movement ==
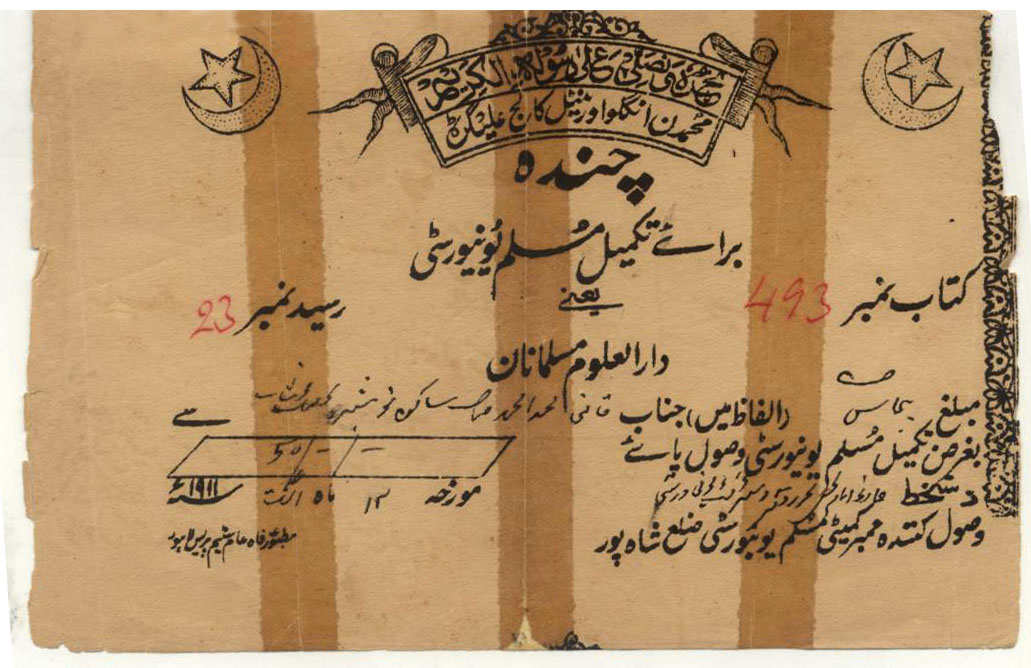
A receipt of donation by Qazi Mian Muhammad Amjad to Aligarh Muslim University

Amjad was a great admirer of Syed Ahmed Khan, and Aligarh Movement. Despite the strong opposition of conservative Muslim Ulema, he supported this movement in his area. He requested to the British Deputy Commissioner of District Shahpur, now District Sargodha, to establish a High School in Naushera. Unlike the Ulema of his time he was very broadminded, and send his third son to the school. For its success, the Aligarh Movement depended wholly on public donations. Sir Syed Ahmed Khan made notable personal contributions and went whole India, and overboard in his fund collection drive. He organised lotteries, staged drama and felt no hesitation to visit any place, including red light areas, to collect money. Qazi Mian Muhammad Amjad himself gave donation and persuaded all local influential landlords to contribute in this regard.

60 conservative Ulema and Alims had signed fatwas accusing Sir Syed of disbelief and apostasy. There was total consensus among the Ulema and Alims, only divine approval was missing. Maulvi Ali Bakhsh did the needful and travelled to Mecca and Medina on the pretext of pilgrimage and secured a fatwa calling for beheading of Sir Syed if he repented not and persisted with his plan to establish the college. But Qazi Mian Muhammad Amjad urged his people to support Aligarh movement.

Amjad was a "Hakeem" or herbalist (an herbal medicine practitioner) of first rank. He did not accept remuneration from patients for his treatments. Later, his elder son Qazi Mahar Qayyum (Raees azam Naushera) became a very accomplished "Hakeem".

Qazi Mian Muhammad Amjad died on 20 Jan 1920. He was buried in Naushera, Soon Valley of Punjab, where his tomb became a site of Sufi veneration.

== Notes and references ==
=== Sources ===
1. This family genealogical table has been copied from a very ancient manuscript found in the library of Qazi Mian Muhammad Amjad. Jamal ad-Din Hasan ibn Yusuf ibn 'Ali ibn Muthahhar al-Hilli also mentioned the names of first twelve generations of this Genealogical table in his book Kihalastah al-Nisab, a treatise on the descendants of 'Ali Ibn Abi Talib', Alawi. This treatise also includes the descendants of Ali Ibn Abi Talib who migrated to other countries after the rise of Umayyad Caliphate. The author of 'Bab-ul-Awan', a history of Awan tribe, also mentions the names of first twelve generations in his book. 'Bab-ul-Awan', a history of Awan tribe, by Muhammad Noor ud Din Sulemani. edition 1923.
2. Anwar Shamsia, A biography of Pir Khawaja Shams-ud-din Sialvi, by Maulvi Ameer Baksh. Edition 1916
3. Hu al-Hameed by Sahibzada Muhammad Masood Ahmad.
4. Wadi Soon sakesar (The Soon Valley) by Sufi Sarwar, published by Al- Faisal Nashran, Lahore A joint venture of Lok Virsa, Islamabad and AL-Faisal Nashran, Lahore, copy right Lok Virsa, Islamabad 2002.
