= Jalalabad Ragib-Rabeya Medical College =

Private medical school in Sylhet, Bangladesh

Jalalabad Ragib-Rabeya Medical College and Hospital
- জালালাবাদ রাগীব-রাবেয়া মেডিকেল কলেজ
- Type: Private medical school
- Established: 1995
- Academic affiliations: Shahjalal University of Science and Technology (SUST)
- Chairman: Syed Ragib Ali
- Principal: Abed Hossain
- Academic staff: 290 (2015)
- Students: 700
- Location: Pathantula, Sylhet, Bangladesh; 24.9135°N 91.8527°E
- Campus: Urban
- Language: English
- Website: jrrmc.edu.bd

Jalalabad Ragib-Rabeya Medical College (JRRMC) (Bengali: জালালাবাদ রাগীব-রাবেয়া মেডিকেল কলেজ) is a private medical school in Bangladesh, established in 1995. It is located in the Pathantula area of Bimanbandar Thana, in Sylhet. It is affiliated with Shahjalal University of Science and Technology (SUST) under the School of Medical Sciences. The college is associated with the 925-bed Jalalabad Ragib-Rabeya Medical College Hospital.

== History ==
Industrialist Ragib Ali and his wife, Rabeya Khatun Chowdhury, established Jalalabad Ragib-Rabeya Medical College in 1995. The medical college is located at Tarapur Tea Estate

== Campus ==
The college is located in the Pathantula area of Bimanbandar Thana, in Sylhet. On the 8.22 acres (3.33 ha) campus are three main buildings: two ten-story academic buildings and the associated six-story, 925-bed, Jalalabad Ragib-Rabeya Medical College Hospital.

== Organization and administration ==
The college is affiliated with Shahjalal University of Science and Technology (SUST) under the School of Medical Sciences. The chairman of the college is Ragib Ali. The principal is Abed Hossain.

== Academics ==
=== Undergraduate ===
The college offers a five-year course of study, approved by the Bangladesh Medical and Dental Council (BMDC), leading to a Bachelor of Medicine, Bachelor of Surgery (MBBS) degree from SUST. After passing the final professional examination, there is a compulsory one-year internship, which is a prerequisite for obtaining registration from the BMDC to practice medicine. In October 2014, the Ministry of Health and Family Welfare capped admission and tuition fees at private medical colleges at 1,990,000 Bangladeshi taka (US$25,750 as of 2014) total for their five-year courses.

Admission for Bangladeshis to the MBBS programme at all medical colleges in Bangladesh (government and private) is conducted centrally by the Directorate General of Health Services (DGHS). It administers a written multiple-choice question exam simultaneously throughout the country. Candidates are admitted based primarily on their score on this test, although grades at Secondary School Certificate (SSC) and Higher Secondary School Certificate (HSC) level also play a part. Seats are reserved, according to quotas set by the DGHS, for children of Freedom Fighters and for students from underprivileged backgrounds. Admission for foreign students is based on their SSC and HSC or equivalent grades. As of July 2014, the college is allowed to admit 190 students annually.

=== Postgraduate ===
The college offers postgraduate study recognised by the Bangladesh College of Physicians and Surgeons (BCPS). It offers postgraduate degree in following subjects:

- Internal medicine
- Otolaryngology
- Dermatology
- General surgery
- Psychiatry
- Physical medicine
- Obstaetrics & gynaecology
- Pathology
- Paediatric surgery
- Paediatrics
- Orthopaedics
- Radiology & imaging
- Ophthalmology
- Cardiology

== Journal ==
Jalalabad Medical Journal is the official journal of the college. It is an open access journal, published semi-annually in January and July. It accepts original research articles, review articles on topics of current interest, and interesting case reports. Submissions should not have been published previously, and should not be submitted to multiple publications concurrently.

== See also ==
- List of medical colleges in Bangladesh
