= North East University Bangladesh =

Private University in Bangladesh

- Motto in English: Education with Innovation
- Type: Private
- Established: 2012
- Chancellor: President Mohammed Shahabuddin
- Vice-Chancellor: Mohammad Iqbal
- Faculty: 100
- Administrative staff: 30
- Location: Telihaor, Sheikhghat, Sylhet, Bangladesh; 24.8902°N 91.8608°E
- Campus: Urban
- Colors: Green
- Website: neub.edu.bd

North East University Bangladesh (Bengali: নর্থ ইষ্ট ইউনিভার্সিটি বাংলাদেশ), also known as NEUB, is a private university in Sylhet, Bangladesh. It was established in 2012. The university was founded by Adv. Iqbal Ahmed Chowdhury.

== History ==
The government has given approval to North East University Bangladesh in Sylhet.

== Academic departments ==
School of Business

- Department of Business Administration

School of Law & Justice

- Department of Law & Justice

School of Social Science

- Department of English
- Department of Public Health

School of Natural Science & Engineering

- Department of Computer Science & Engineering

== Undergraduate programs ==
- BBA (Hons.) program
- B.Sc. (Engg.) in Computer Science & Engineering
- B.A. (Hons.) in English
- LL.B (Hons.)

== Graduate programs ==
- MBA (Regular)
- MBA (Executive)
- MA in English
- LL.M
- MSc. in Mathematics
- MSc. in Mathematics
- Master of Public Health
- Master in Development Studies
