= Qamaruddin Siyalwi =

Pakistani politician (1906–1981)

Personal life
- Born: 1906 Siyal, now in Sahiwal Tehsil, Sargodha District, Punjab, Pakistan
- Died: 1981 (aged 74–75)
- Known for: Sufi scholar and Sunni politician of Jamiat Ulema-e-Pakistan; Political party founder in Pakistan

Religious life
- Religion: Islam
- Denomination: Sunni
- Jurisprudence: Hanafi
- Tariqa: Chishti Order
- Movement: Barelvi

Qamaruddin Siyalwi (Note: Urdu: قمرالدین سیالوی) (1906–1981), was a Pakistani Islamic scholar and politician. He was a Sufi saint belonging to the Chishti order. His followers are mainly located in Pakistan.

He was also the founder of the Sunni Barelvi political party Jamiat Ulema-e-Pakistan (JUP) and became its president in 1970.

He is also credited with being one of the foremost and staunchest supporters of the movement for the creation of Pakistan – Pakistan Movement.

== Early life and education ==
Qamaruddin Siyalwi was born on 24 Jumada al-awwal 1324 A.H. (7 July 1906), in Siyal, in the Punjab Province of British India. He was the eldest son of Ziauddin Siyalwi. He was familiar with the Quran by the age of nine. He received his religious education at several institutions, including ones in Mecca and Ajmer. He very quickly memorised the Qur'an in a short span of time. Later on, Maulana Ajmayri was brought from Ajmayr to Siyal and Khawaja Qamar al-Din continued acquiring knowledge from him.

== All-India Muslim League ==
When Pakistan movement began in addition to the movement for the independence of India, the Indian National Congress party was at the forefront. However, Many Muslim scholars and leaders had become devotees of Indian nationality and stood side by side with the Hindu leaders. At that moment, Muhammad Ali Jinnah demanded the formation of Pakistan. Khawaja Qamaruddin Siyalwi decided to support Jinnah's position and the Muslim League's campaign in the NWFP referendum in British India in1947.

He became the president of the Sargodha branch of the All-India Muslim League. He went to all corners of the subcontinent to campaign for the Muslim League in the 1946 Indian Constituent Assembly election. He particularly walked along with Pir of Zakori in North-West Frontier Province to vote for the independence of Pakistan in the referendum of 1947. After the inception of Pakistan, he wrote to Quaid-e-Azam Muhammad Ali Jinnah to congratulate him and emphasize the need for promulgation of Islamic laws. Replying to his letter Quaid-e-Azam wrote "Efforts on part of Mashaikhs in the Pakistan Movement are highly commendable. Rest assured Islamic laws will be promulgated in Pakistan".

In the India–Pakistan war of 1965, Siyalwi donated all the jewelry of his family to the Pakistan Army.

== Jamiat Ulema-e-Pakistan ==
In 1970, he became the president of Jamiat Ulema-i-Pakistan (JUP) and under his leadership party won many seats in the National Assembly of Pakistan. Under his leadership, the party fared very well in the election of 1970.

He was twice appointed as a member of the Islamic Ideology Council, where he worked hard to make the existing laws according to Islam.

== Awards and recognition ==
Siyalwi was awarded Tamgha-e-Imtiaz (Medal of Excellence), the fourth-highest award of Pakistan, by the President of Pakistan in 1981.

== President of JUP ==
He was among the founders of Jamiat Ulema-e-Pakistan (JUP). He became president of JUP in 1970. Under his leadership JUP took part in elections and won many seats in National Assembly.

== Death ==
He died in a traffic accident on 20 July 1981 (17th Ramadan). After his death, Hameeduddin Siyalwi was elected president of Jamiat Ulema-e-Pakistan.

== See also ==
- Syed Faiz-ul Hassan Shah
- Islam in India
- Islam in Pakistan
- Islam in Bangladesh
- Islam in the United Kingdom
