= Pre-school playgroup =

A pre-school playgroup, or in everyday usage just a playgroup, is an organised group providing care and socialisation for children under five. The term is widely used in the United Kingdom. Playgroups are the same as preschool education and nursery schools. They can provide full-time care, or operate for only a few hours a day during school-term time or all year round. The business model of a playgroup has changed over time and they are now very similar to pre-schools, nurseries and schools. They are staffed by nursery nurses, nursery teachers or qualified nursery practitioners, and are run by private individuals or charities, rather than by the state or companies.

In the United Kingdom, since around the 1980s, the traditional territory of the playgroup has been encroached on by the expansion of more formal nursery education, and playgroups often now cater for children aged between 2 and 5 years of age before they move onto school. Over the same period there has been an increase in the state supervision of playgroups.

== Playgroups in the United States ==
In the United States, a playgroup is an organization of parents with the expressed intent to have the children come together and play. There are playgroups that cater to specific categories of parents, particularly including stay at-home-dads, stay-at-home moms, and working moms. In areas of the US where homeschooling is popular, it is not unusual to see groups specifically for homeschooling families. These can be part of localized or even national playgroups. Churches, rec centers, and other community organizations sometimes sponsor weekly or monthly playgroups. Age limits are determined by the individual group. Some groups have upper age limits and some do not. It is not unusual to see groups where, in addition to activities for the children, there are social events for the whole family or for parents only. In highly mobile communities, playgroups can be an important tool for building the social networks of young families who have recently relocated to the area.

== International playgroups in the Netherlands ==
In the Netherlands, international and expatriate parents form small groups, local to their area, for the purpose of providing a play space for children up to the age of 4-5, as well as offering a support network for the parents themselves. Meetings are usually held weekly in a hall or other public venue, and the groups usually organize other social activities such as Ladies Nights Out, visits to local parks and zoos, and summer barbecues.

== Playgroups in Australia ==
Playgroup Australia is the national peak and administrative body for playgroups in Australia. Playgroup is an informal session where moms, dads, grandparents, caregivers, and children meet together in a relaxed environment.

Playgroups are set up and run by parents and caregivers, with children choosing from a range of activities set up to meet their varying needs. Activities at playgroup are either free or low cost, and may include music and singing, imaginative play, outdoor and free play, art and craft activities or outings.

Playgroups can be held anywhere that is safe for children and where groups of people can meet – community and neighbourhood centres, health clinics, women's centres, preschools and kindergartens, church halls and even in someone's house. In a playgroup, parents and caregivers stay to interact with the other adults and to play with the children. No child is too young for playgroup.

March 2003 saw a dramatic increase in the number of mothers attending playgroup.

== Playgroups in Hong Kong ==
In Hong Kong, preschool children (0 – 3 years) join playgroups to study (mostly foreign languages) in an interactive environment before entering kindergarten.

== Playgroups in Philippines ==
In the Philippines, typical playgroup activity centers can be usually seen in malls where parents can leave their children for a few minutes to a few hours in an interactive environment where they can play and learn together with a random group of children. There are also toddler playgroup classes in several schools which offer a combination of Family Music, story telling, sensory activities, simple puzzles, and matching and sorting activities.
