= Siyal, Pakistan =

Village in Sahiwal Tehsil, Sargodha District, Punjab, Pakistan

Siyal
- Village
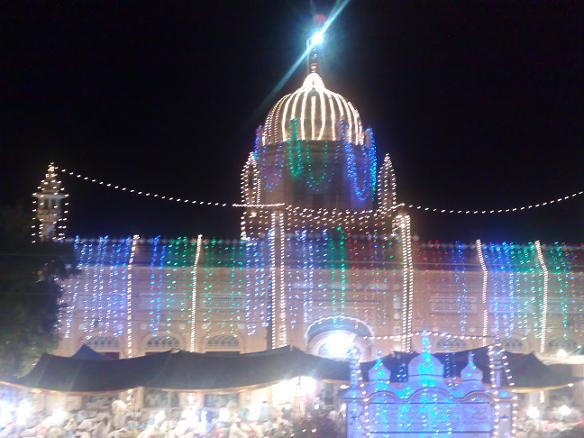
- Shrine of Shamsuddin Siyalwi (1799 – 1883) in Siyal, Pakistan
- Interactive map of Siyal
- Coordinates: 31°54′36″N 72°18′07″E
- Country: Pakistan
- Province: Punjab

Population (2017 Census of Pakistan)
  - Total: 1,303
- Time zone: UTC+5 (PST)

Siyal (Urdu: سیال) is a village in the Sahiwal Tehsil, Sargodha District of Punjab, Pakistan. It is known for its Sufi shrines.

== Sufi shrines ==
After the death of Shamsuddin Siyalwi (1799 – 1883) in the 19th century, care of his shrine passed to Muhammaduddin Siyalwi and, after his demise in 1909, to his son Ziauddin Siyalwi.

It subsequently passed on to Ziauddin Siyalwi's eldest son Qamaruddin Siyalwi (7 July 1906 – 20 July 1981), president of the Sargodha branch of Muslim League who became famous for donating all his valuables to the Pakistani Army during the India–Pakistan war of 1965. In 1970, Qamaruddin became president of Jamiat Ulema-i-Pakistan and member of Islamic Ideology Council, in 1981 receiving Tamgha-e-Imtiaz (medal of distinction) from the President of Pakistan.
