= Mohammad Abdul Malek =

Bangladeshi politician

- মোহাম্মদ আব্দুল মালেক

Member of the Bangladesh Parliament for Sylhet-3
- Incumbent
- Assumed office 17 February 2026
- Preceded by: Habibur Rahman Habib

Personal details
- Born: 12 November 1957 (age 68) Dakshin Surma Upazila, Sylhet District
- Party: Bangladesh Nationalist Party

Mohammad Abdul Malek is a Bangladeshi politician of the Bangladesh Nationalist Party. He is currently serving as a member of parliament from Sylhet-3.

== Early life ==
Malek was born on 12 November in 1957 at Dakshin Surma Upazila under Sylhet District.
