= Haor =

Geological wetlands in Bangladesh

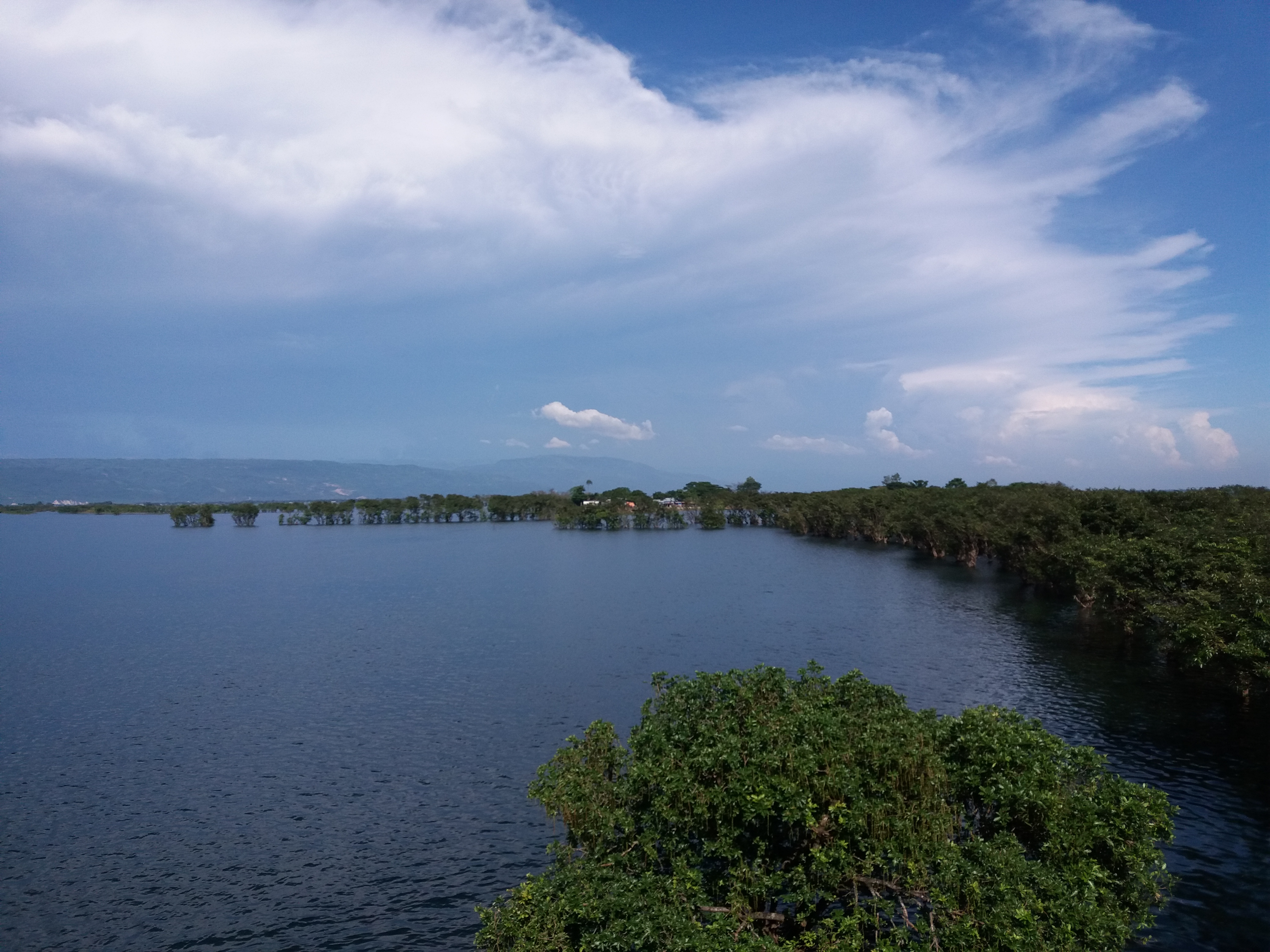
Tanguar Haor is one of the largest haors in Bangladesh. A typical freshwater swamp forest can be seen on the right and the Khasi Hills of the state of Meghalaya in India are in the background.

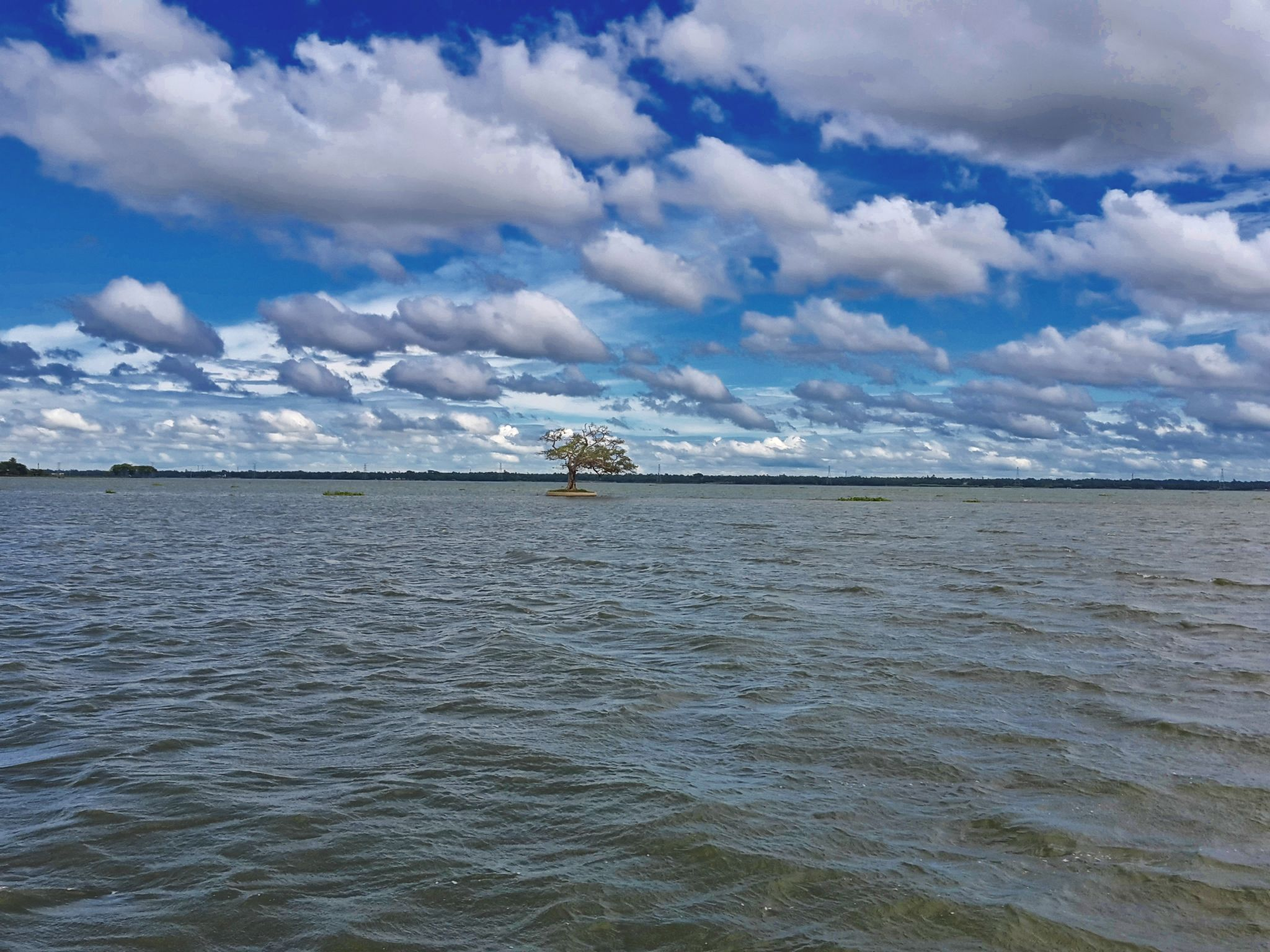
A haor in Sylhet region

A haor (Bengali: হাওর) (Note: Standard Bengali: [ɦao̯r] Eastern dialects: [ɦaʊɹ] Sylheti: [ɦáɔɹ]) is a wetland ecosystem in the north eastern part of Bangladesh which is physically a bowl or saucer shaped shallow depression, also known as a backswamp. During monsoons haors receive surface runoff water from rivers and canals to become vast stretches of turbulent water.

== Haor, baor, beel and jheel ==
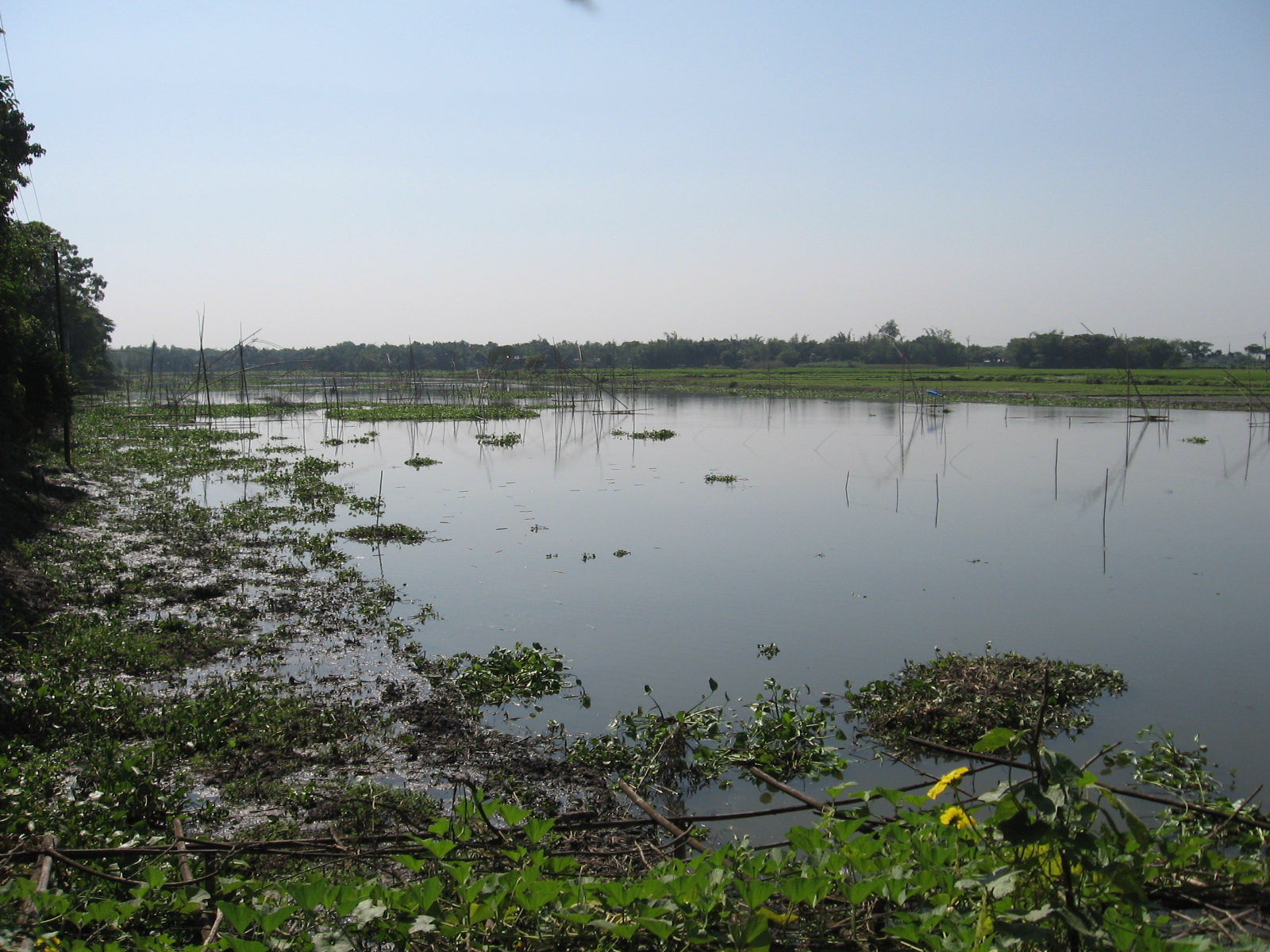
A beel in Tangail District

In Bangladesh and in the deltaic part of the Indian state of West Bengal, which lie in the floodplain of three great rivers, the Bengali language has several terms to differentiate between lakes, including baor, haor, jheel and beel. All four are similar types of freshwater wetlands. The distinctions among a haor, beel or baor are usually small.

A beel is usually a depression or topographic low generally produced by erosion or other geographical process. These are marshy in character. Sometimes beels are remains of a river that has changed its course. Many of the beels dry up in the winter but during the rains expand into broad and shallow sheets of water, which may be described as fresh water lagoons. Beels are generally smaller than haors, but there also are large beels like Chalan Beel in Rajshahi Division, through which the Atrai River passes. It has shrunk over the years but still occupies an area of 26 km^{2} in the dry season. Sometimes small permanent water bodies within the haors remain after the haors dry up. These are also called beels, which occupy the lowest part of the depressions. A baor or jheel is an oxbow lake, namely moribund beds of the Bhairab, Kaliganga, Gorai and Kumar rivers.

A simple definition was provided by hydrologist Saila Parveen, "Haor – seasonal wetland, baor – oxbow lake, and beel – perennial water body." Jheels or baors are found mostly in the moribund delta as in greater Comilla, Faridpur, Dhaka and Pabna districts. The haor is predominantly a feature of north-eastern Bangladesh. Beels are seen all over Bangladesh and the neighboring districts of West Bengal. Haors play an important role in supporting local livelihoods, especially through fisheries and seasonal agriculture. During the monsoon, they become vast water bodies that provide breeding grounds for fish, while in the dry season, the exposed land is often used for cultivating boro rice. These wetlands also help in groundwater recharge and act as natural flood retention basins, reducing the impact of seasonal flooding in surrounding areas.

== Geography and geology ==
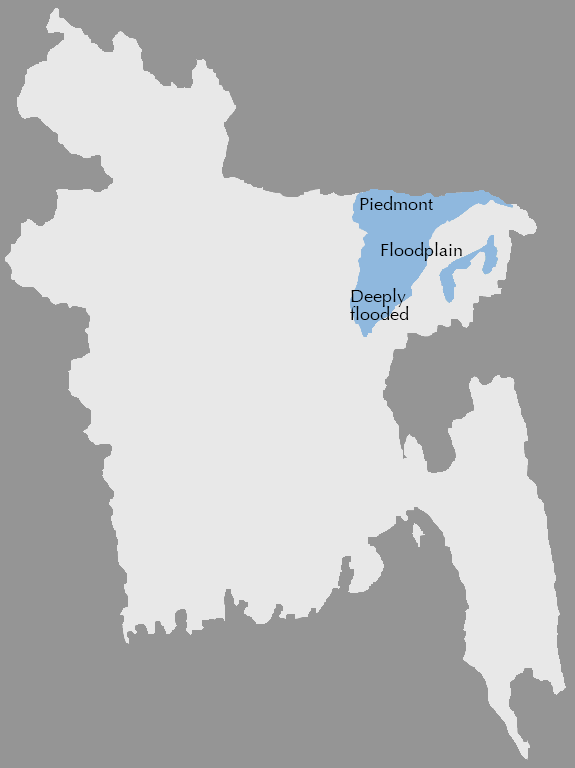
The extent and location of haor basin

In a country where one third of all area can be termed as wetlands, the haor basin is an internationally important wetland ecosystem, spread over Sunamganj, Habiganj, Moulvibazar districts and Sylhet Sadar Upazila, as well as Kishoreganj and Netrokona districts outside the core haor area. It is a mosaic of wetland habitats, including rivers, streams and irrigation canals, large areas of seasonally flooded cultivated plains, and hundreds of haors and beels. This zone contains about 400 haors and beels, varying in size from a few hectares to several thousand hectares.

The core haor area, alternatively referred to as the Haor basin or the Sylhet basin, is estimated to spread over an area between 4,450 km^{2} and 25,000 square kilometres by experts. The total area of haor-type wetland ecosystem in Bangladesh is 80,000 square kilometres. The haor basin is bounded by the hill ranges of India – Meghalaya on the north, Tripura and Mizoram on the south, and Assam and Manipur on the east. The basin extends north to the foot of the Garo and Khasia Hills, and east along the upper Surma Valley to the Indian border. The Tippera surface lies directly to the south of the Haor Basin, and is partly low and deltaic and partly higher ground with a piedmont fringe to the east. It includes about 47 major haors and some 6,300 beels of varying size, of which about 3,500 are permanent and 2,800 are seasonal.

These area is low because of subsidence of tectonic Dauki fault. In the geological depression of the haor basin, subsidence is continuing at an estimated rate of 20 mm per year. In some places it has sunk by around 10 m in the last few hundred years. The area, by some experts, is further divided into three zones by standards of morphology and hydrology:

=== Climate and floods ===
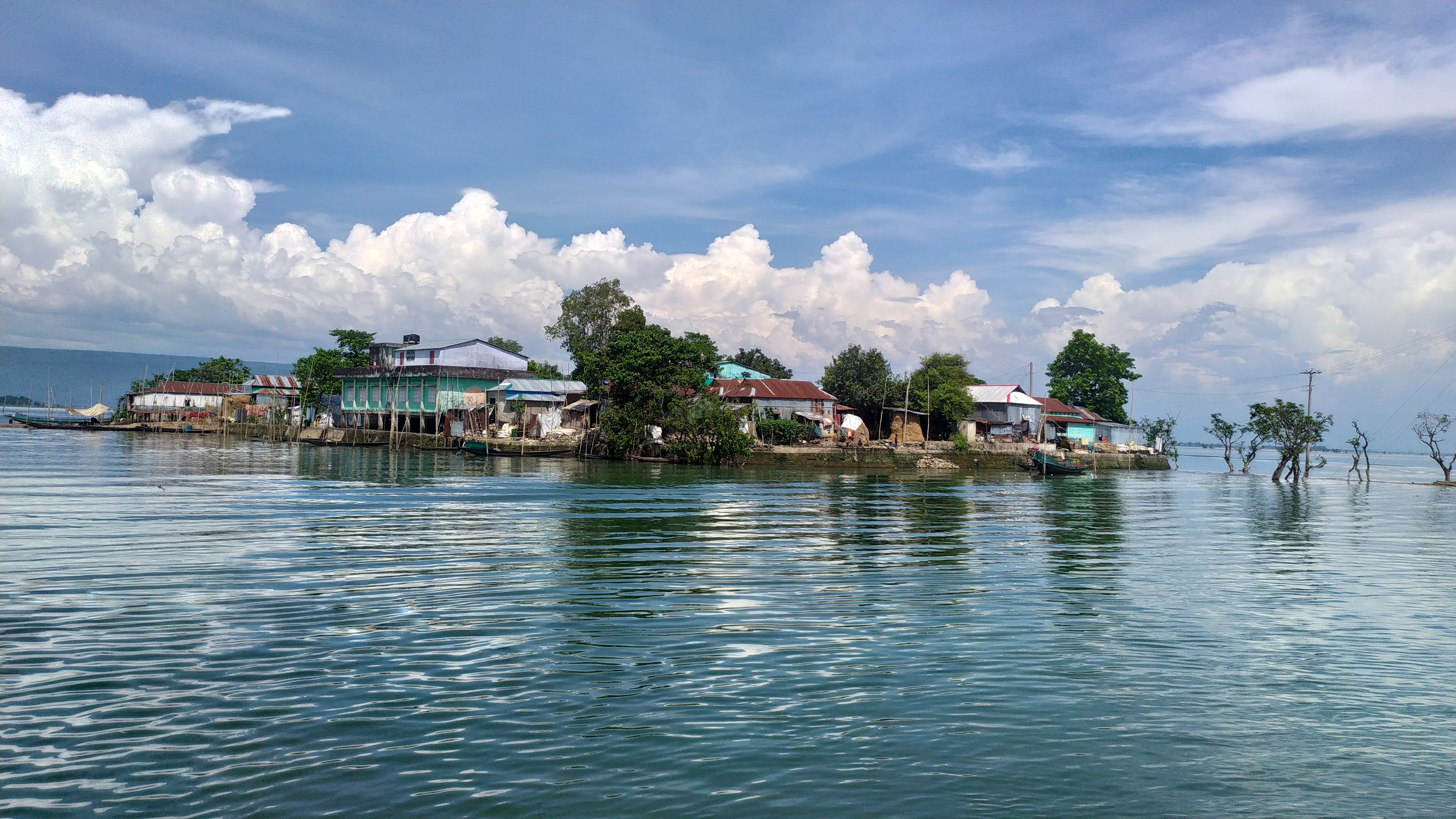
Villages appear to be islands in a haor

The haor basin is a remote and difficult area that is flooded every year during monsoon.

Some of the most extensive seasonally flooded areas in South Asia are situated in bowl-shaped depressions known as haors located between the natural levees of rivers subject to overflow during the monsoon. The major rivers in the area are Surma and Kushiyara. Some of the tributaries are: Manu, Khowai, Jadukhata, Piyain, Mogra, Mahadao and Kangsha. The hilly rivers coming down from the Khasi and Jaintia hills in Meghalaya carry particularly high volumes of water as they come from some of the rainiest places in the world.

During July to November due to flood these areas go under deep water and look like seas with erosive water surface. During wind storm these waves reach up to 1.5 m in height. It remains under water for seven months of the year, turning haor settlements mostly built on earthen mounds into islands.

The fight against natural calamity of the locals people, mostly day laborers, relies on traditional and indigenous methods which with limited effect. Many villages have already been washed away, and many more are on the verge of extinction, forcing people to migrate to urban centers.

=== Flora ===
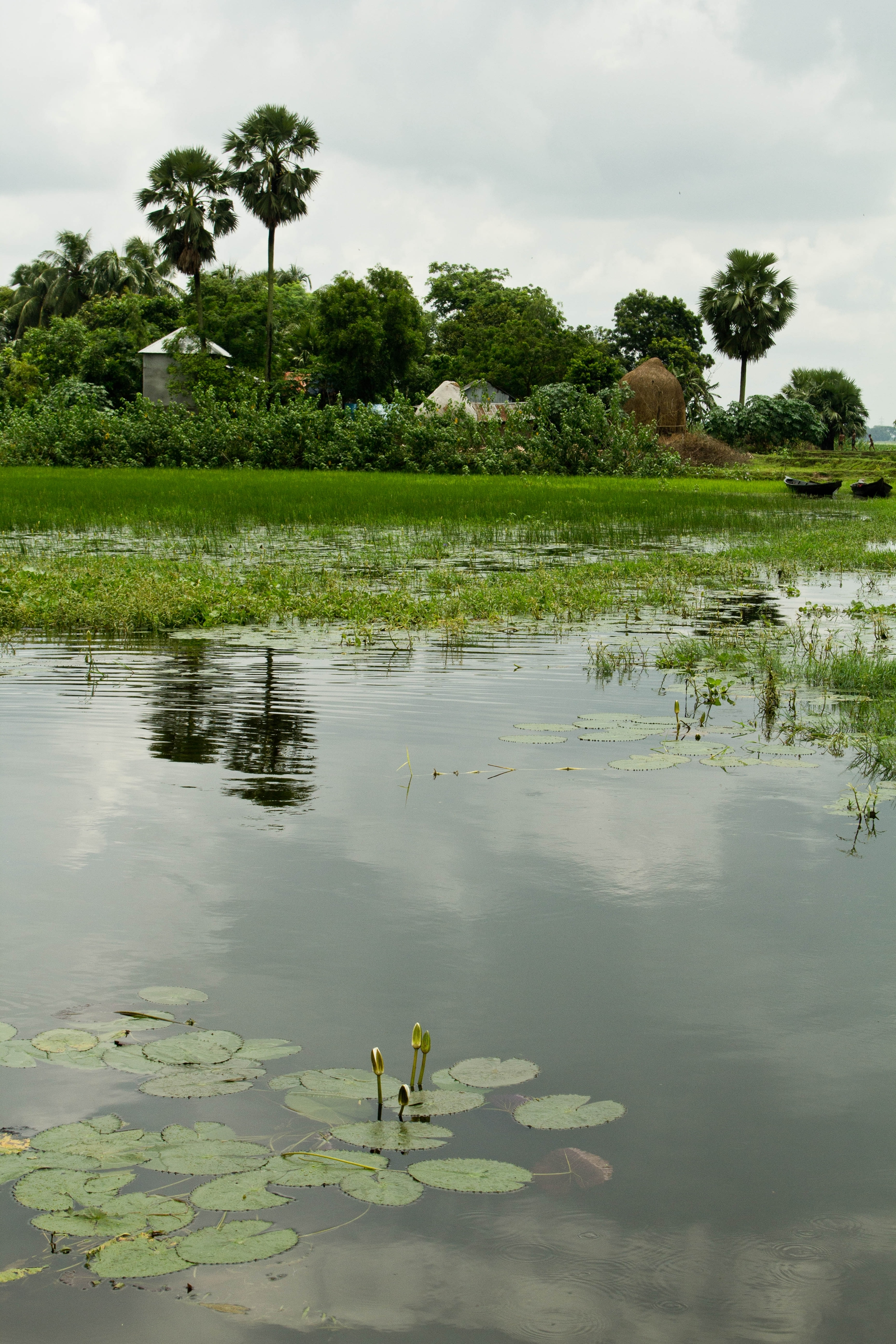
Lowland plants, emergent grass and aquatic plants in haor basin

The Haor Basin is the only region in Bangladesh where remnant patches of freshwater swamps and reed lands still exists. Once extensive forests of Hijal in the area used to provide an important source of firewood, but these forests are now almost completely destroyed. In recent times, various herbs and aquatic plants are being collected for use as fuel. On top of that, aquatic plants are also being collected for use as fertilizers. Only a few patches remain of the swamp forests that once dominated the area, featuring flood tolerant trees like Hijal (Barringtonia acutangula) and Koroch (Pongamia pinnata).

Joseph Dalton Hooker (1817–1911) did the original survey of local flora sometime in 1850, recorded in his Himalayan Journals (published by the Calcutta Trigonometrical Survey Office and The Minerva Library of Famous Books; Ward, Lock, Bowden & Co., 1891). The findings of his travels along the Surma and visiting the wetlands of Sylhet are reflected in his Flora of British India. Three habitat types in the Sylhet region were identified on the basis of botanical records of Kanjilal (U.N. Kanjilal, P.C. Kanjilal & A. Das; Flora of Assam; 1934): Upland vegetation, Emergent vegetation, and Aquatic vegetation.

The hijal or hual, korij or koroch, bhui dumur (Ficus heterophylla), nol (Arundo donax), khagra (Phragmites karka), ban golap (Rosa involucratia) and barun (Crataeva nurvala) are the main plant species found in the swamp forests. All of them are flood-tolerant species and can survive in the submerged condition for extended periods of time. However, among these, hijal, tamal and koroj trees are of the greatest value to the people and the environment. Other plant species available in the wetlands include madar (Erythrina variegata), gab (Diospyros peregrina), makna (Euryale ferox), singara (Trapa bispinosa), jaldumur (a kind of Ficus), chitki (Phyllanthus reticulatus), thankuni (Centella asiatica), kalmi (Ipomoea aquatica), helencha (Enhydra fluctuans), hogla (Typha elephantina), duckweed, water hyacinth, lotus and water lily.

=== Conservation ===
Three zones of international importance for conservation and sustainable utilization - the Meghna estuary, Tanguar haor and Hail-Hakaluki haors - have been declared as Ramsar sites under the Ramsar Convention for protection of wetlands, of which Bangladesh is a signatory. The Bangladesh government has also declared the Tanguar haor an Ecologically Critical Area. The Haor basin has a number of government bodies working to preserve the environment, including the Forest Resources Management Project, Management of Aquatic Ecosystem through Community Husbandry, Haor and Floodplain Resource, Conservation and Management of Medicinal Plants and Coastal and Wetland Biodiversity Management at Cox's Bazar and Hakaluki Haor.

== Human habitation ==
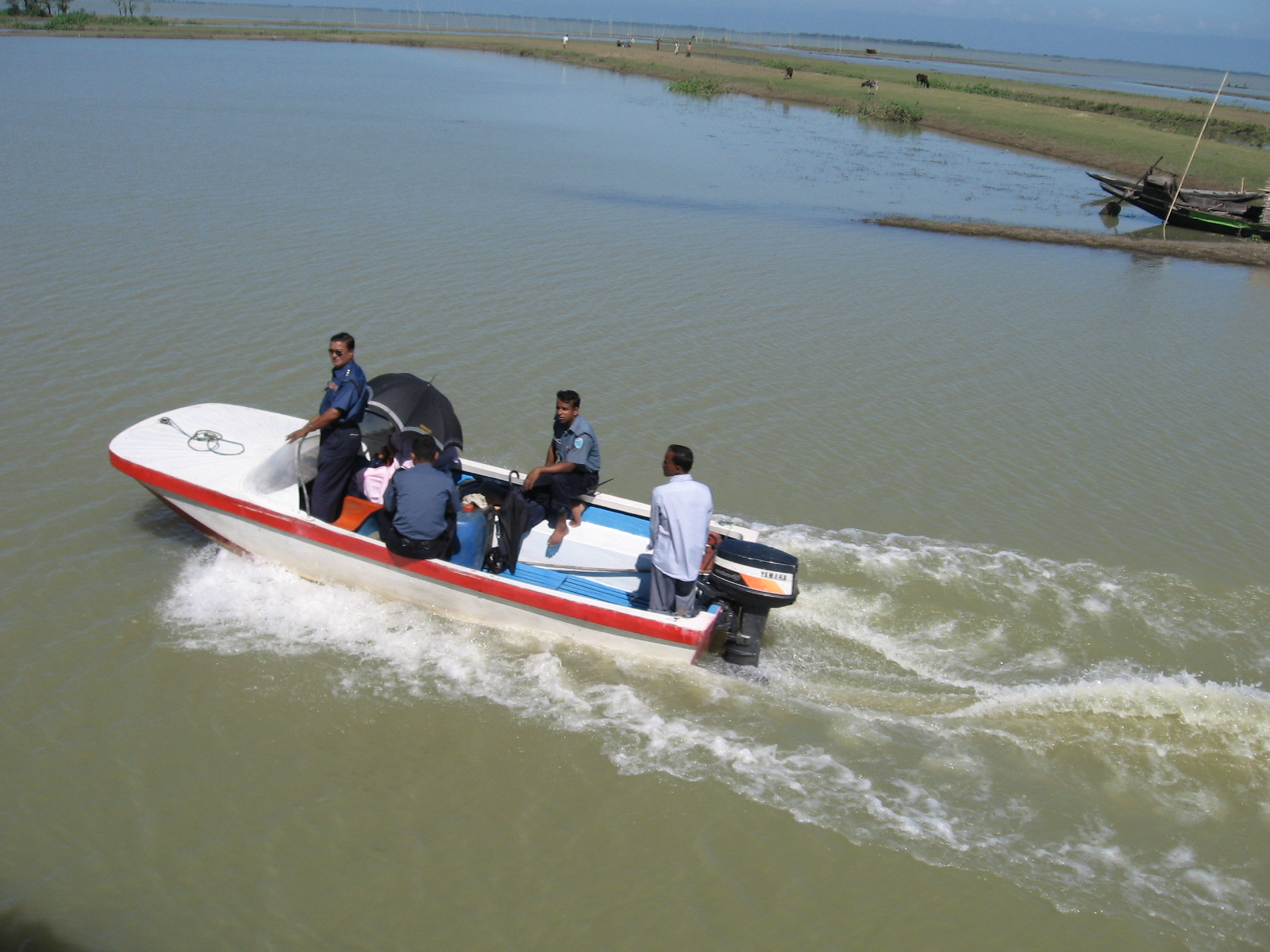
A police patrol speed boat in the haor region

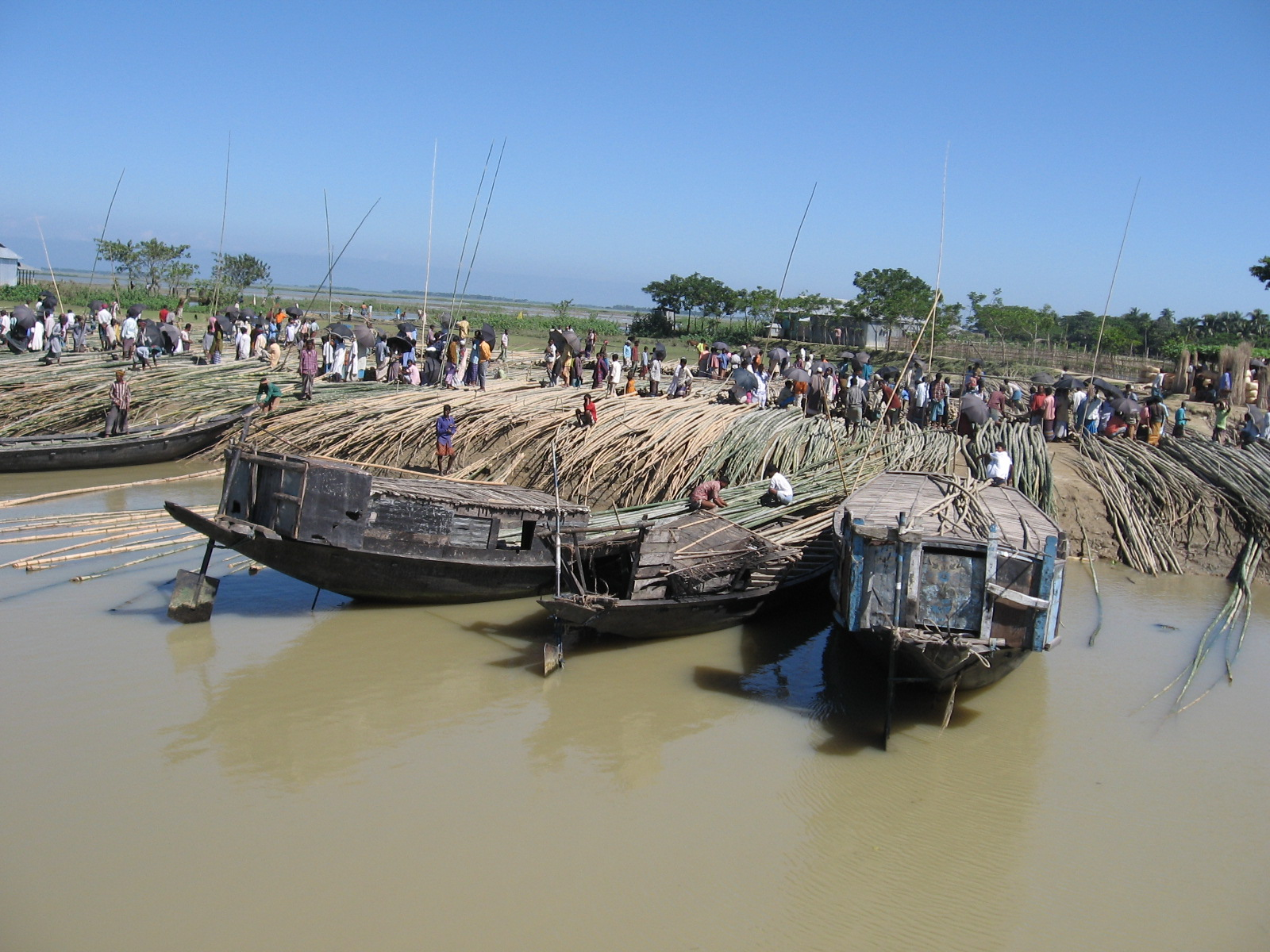
Bamboo market at Pashukhali

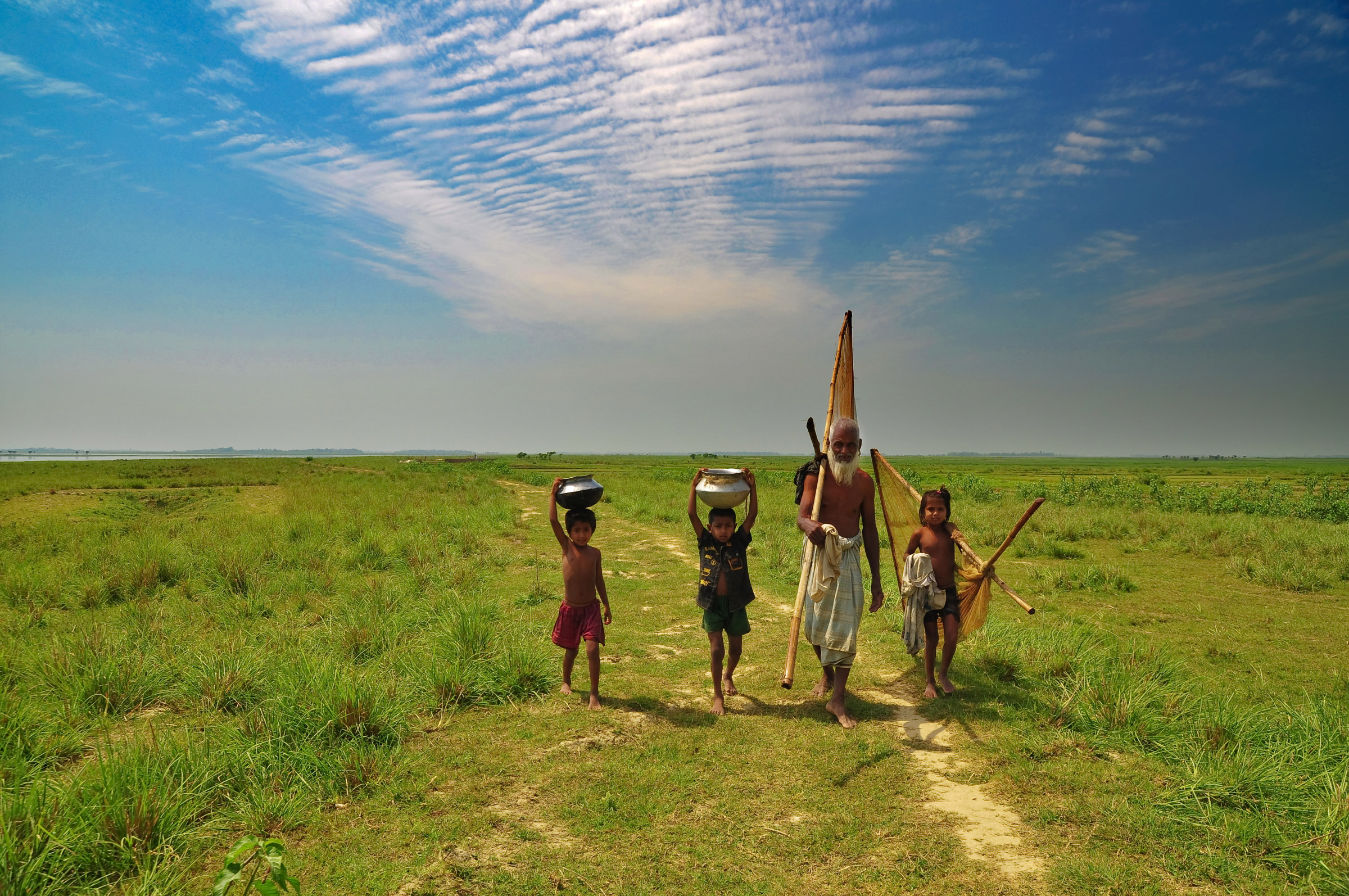
Fishing is a major livelihood

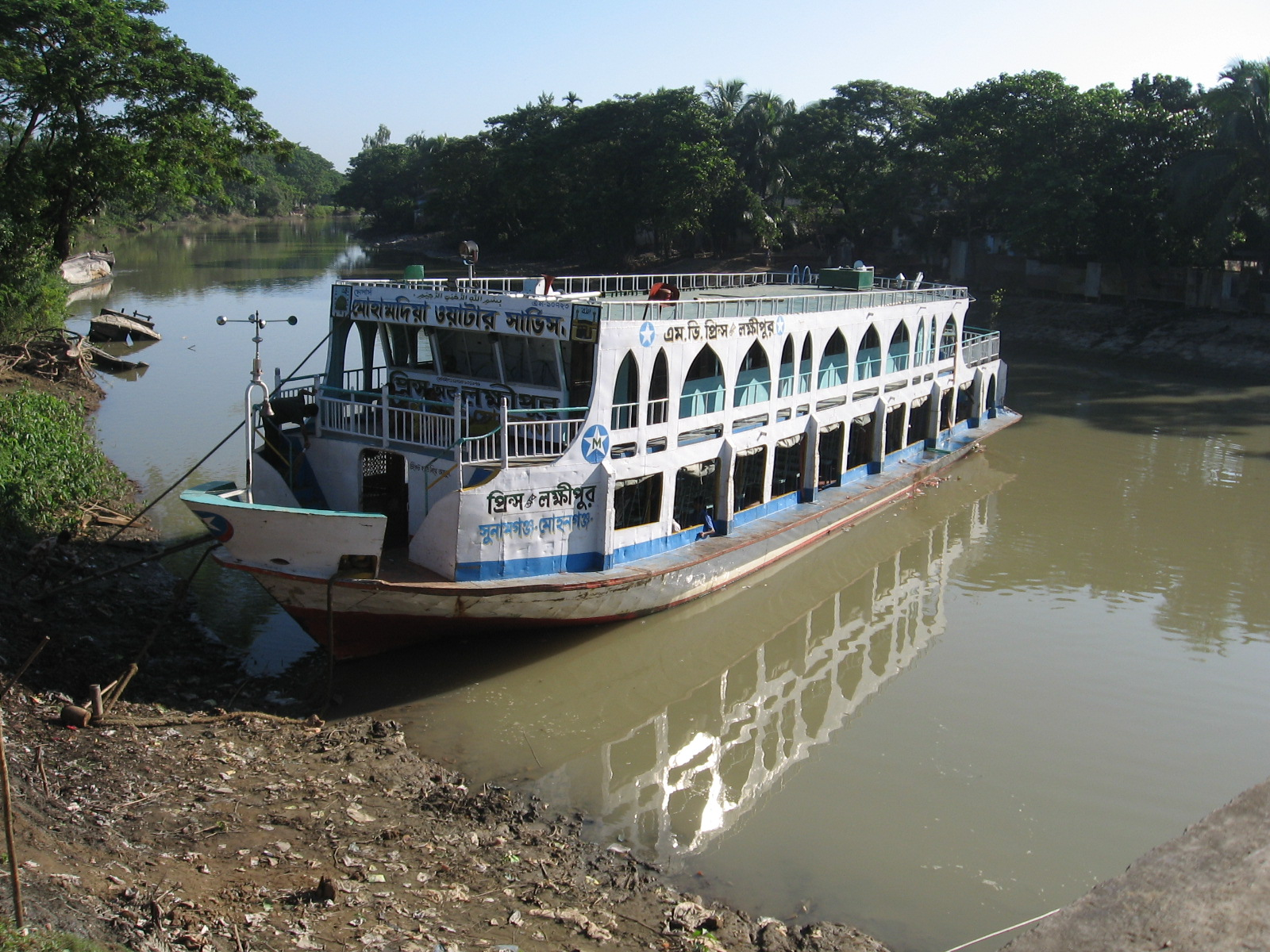
A regular passenger launch at Mohanganj

Prior to the 12th century there is almost no information available on the human habitation here. The information up to the 17th century is sketchy. During the British period, this area was not stringently surveyed, and not a lot of information is available.

It is believed that the early settlers of the area were Hindus and other ethnic groups including Garo, Hajong, Khasi and Koch people coming down from the hills to the north. They were drawn to the area because of its productivity and favorable tenurial terms. With the expansion of Muslim power in the south and the west further Hindu migration continued in the 13th and 14th century. Following an Afghan defeat in Orissa in 1592, a large number of Afghans moved into the area. Expansion of Muslim population continued after the Muslim conquest of Sylhet in 1612, accelerating after the British conquest of Sylhet in 1765. By the 1770s all the cultivable land was brought under plough cultivation.

From the 1780s, population and area under cultivation declined till early 20th century, mostly due to successive natural calamities including floods and earthquakes. The haor basin became an important fishing zone during this time. Population growth picked up again in the 20th century, again due to the opportunity to cultivate land for a nominal rent.

In the haor region, villages are tightly nucleated and built on the natural levees (locally known as kandas). The haor villages are very large in size because no settlement can take place beyond the levees. During the dry cropping season, the satellite villages are established deep inside haor beds, far from parent villages. After harvesting and before inundation, the village structures are dismantled and transported back to parent villages along with harvests.

== Economy ==
These haors and beels support major subsistence and commercial fisheries, while the seasonally flooded lake margins support major rice-growing activities. The main crop grown in the haor basin is boro rice or dry season rice. Early monsoon flash floods often cause extensive damage to the boro crop. Protection in the form of full flood dykes or submersible dykes is being provided in some of the developed areas. Among the varieties of rice cultivated in winter, the Boro season, in the knee-deep water of marshlands, the Hashi (BR-17), the Shahjalal (BR-18) and the Mongol (BR-19) varieties are best suited for the haor areas.

Haors and baors, along with the rivers, canals and the floodplain, are a major source of fish production. But, due to silting, and excessive harvesting of fish to meet the demand of growing populations production of fish from this source is gradually dwindling. In recent years, the wetlands have also been used for rearing domestic ducks.

Due to scarcity of cultivable land, government lands (khas land) including the wetlands are increasing getting transferred to private ownership in Bangladesh. Thus most of the haors and beels have now been sold or leased to private individuals for cultivation during the dry season. This transfer is governed by the Haor Development Board Ordinance (Ordinance No. IX of 1977) are under the direct control of the Revenue Department in the Ministry of Land Administration and Land Reforms.

== Tourism ==
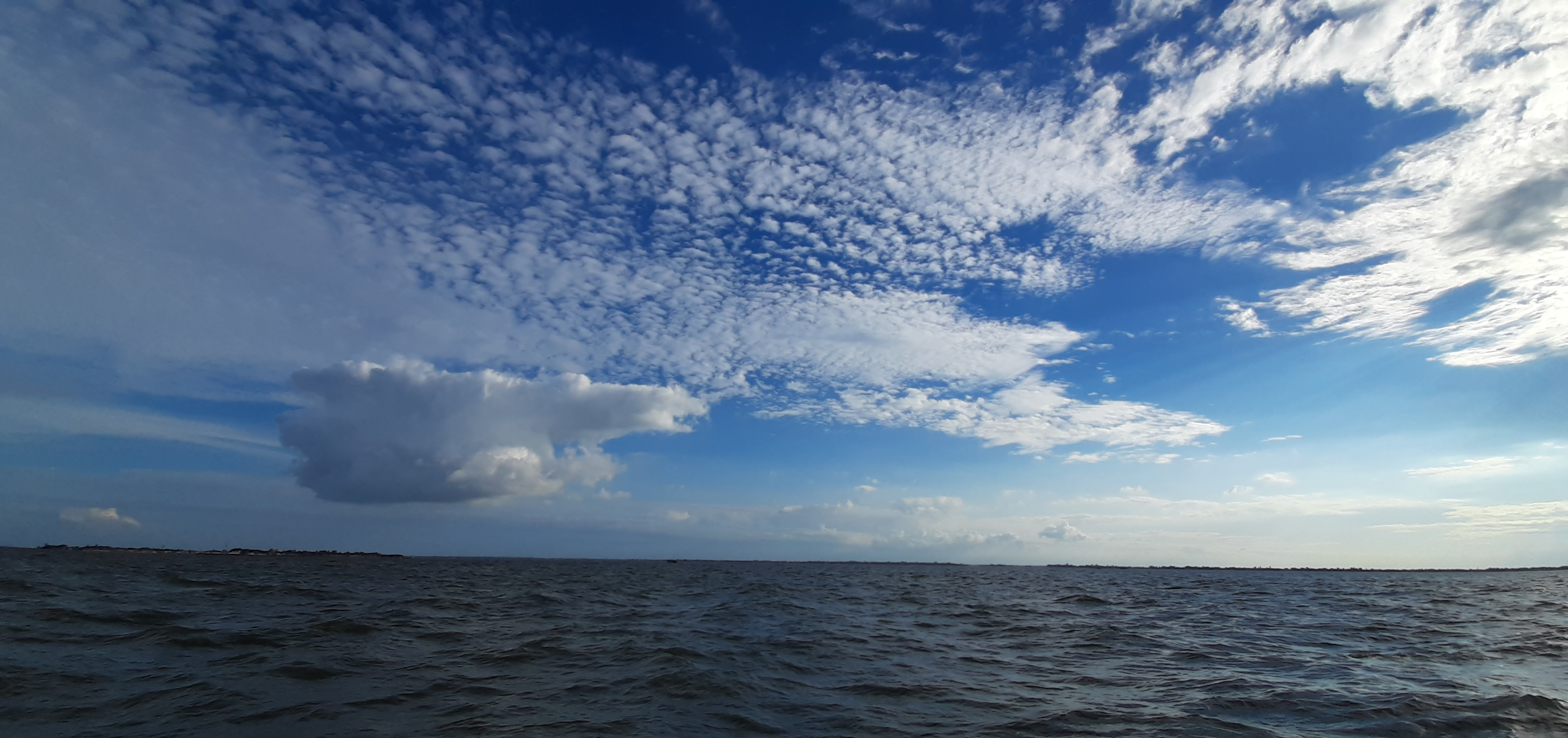
Nikli Haor is one of the beautiful tourist places in Bangladesh.

The wetland ecosystem of the hoars has become a Bangladesh tourist attraction, particularly in August–September when they are full of water. In winter, the haors and beels receive thousands of migratory birds attracting birdwatchers.

Lonely Planet describes these areas as "some of the most fascinating rural areas of Bangladesh." According to the Ministry of Water Resources of Bangladesh, there were 144 of tourist spots in the Haor area in 2012, of which 37 were natural and 107 were manmade. The Ministry declared its aims to increase the current GDP rate of the tourism sector from 0.70 in 2012 to 2% by 2015 and then to 5% by 2021. 13 tourism development projects were declared including 2 eco-parks, 6 tourist spots, 3 nos of bird watching tower, a fish park, a wildlife sanctuary, and a tourist center near Hammam Waterfall including hotels, restaurants, and parking areas. International Union for Conservation of Nature (IUCN) considers the increase in tourist traffic as "a potential opportunity for the haor dwellers for improving their livelihoods." IUCN Bangladesh initiated a community-based tourism project in the Tanguar Haor wetland area (a Ramsar site) as one of the ways for sustainable management of wetland resources.

== See also ==
- Geography of Bangladesh
- Beel
- Rivers in Bangladesh
