= Mohammad Habibur Rahman (politician) =

Bangladeshi politician

Pir Habibur Rahman
- পীর হাবিবুর রহমান

Member of Parliament for Sylhet-3
- In office 7 May 1986 – 3 March 1988
- Preceded by: Dewan Shamsul Abedin
- Succeeded by: Abdul Mukit Khan

Personal details
- Born: Mohammad Habibur Rahman; 9 October 1927 Sylhet District, Assam Province, British India
- Died: 16 February 2004 (aged 76) Sylhet, Bangladesh
- Party: GP (1990–2001)
- Other political affiliations: NAP(U) (1986–1990); NAP(M) (1975–1986); CPB (1971–1975); NAP(W) (1967–1971); NAP (1957–1967); AL (1955–1957); CPP (1949–1954)

Mohammad Habibur Rahman (9 October 1927 – 16 February 2004), also known as Comrade Pir Habibur Rahman, was a Bangladeshi politician and organizer of the Liberation War. He was a member of parliament for the Sylhet-3 constituency. He was also a member of the East Pakistan Legislative Assembly in 1957.

== Early life ==
Habibur Rahman was born on 9 October 1927 in Bagerkhla, Sylhet District, Assam Province, British India (present-day Dakshin Surma Upazila, Bangladesh).

== Career ==
Habibur first became member of All-India Muslim Students Federation. After the independence of Pakistan, he joined East Pakistan Democratic Youth League. He was elected a member of the East Pakistan Legislative Assembly in a by-election to a seat in Sylhet Sadar. Then he joined the National Awami Party (NAP) from the All-Pakistan Awami League (AL) in 1957. In 1967, he joined National Awami Party (Wali) (NAPW). From 1971 to 1975, he was a member of Communist Party of Bangladesh (CPB). After that he joined National Awami Party (Muzaffar) (NAPM) and became its general-secretary. In 1986, Rahman formed their own faction of National Awami Party with Chowdhury Harunur Rashid and Syed Altaf Hossain.

He was elected member of parliament for the Sylhet-3 constituency as a candidate of the Awami League-led 15-party alliance in the third parliamentary elections of 1986.

After 1990, he co-founded Ganatantri Party (GP) and became its president. In 2001, he retired from politics for health issues.

== Death and legacy ==
Habibur Rahman died on 16 February 2004 in Sylhet, Bangladesh. In 2013, the Royal City Square in Sylhet was renamed after him.
