= Ficus repens =

Ficus repens can refer to:

- Ficus repens Rottler, a synonym of Ficus heterophylla L.f.
- Ficus repens Roxb. ex Willd., a synonym of Ficus assamica Miq.
