= Bornir Dhuchnir Doi =

Yogurt

- Place of origin: Bangladesh
- Region or state: Sylhet Division
- Serving temperature: cold
- Main ingredients: milk

Dhuchnir Doi of Barni is a special variety of yogurt originating from Borni Union in the Baralekha Upazila of Moulvibazar District. It is prepared from the milk of cows and buffaloes. This yogurt is uniquely set in a traditional cylindrical bamboo basket known as a Dhusni or Dhuchni, which gives it its distinctive name Dhuchnir Doi of Barni (Bornir Dhuchnir Doi).

== Tradition ==
Women from the Hakaluki Haor area of Barni Union collect buffalo milk and then boil it for three to four hours. The milk is considered ready for yogurt-making once it thickens and turns a deep brownish colour. This milk is then poured into small baskets made of bamboo and cane, locally known as dhusoi or dhuchni, whose pores are sealed with a coating of wheat flour. The yogurt is set in these baskets. The uniqueness of this yogurt is not just in the name of the container, but also in its taste because it is made from pure milk. This yogurt is particularly popular in Juri (Moulvibazar), Sylhet, and Golapganj.
