= Fenchuganj Upazila =

Fenchuganj ফেঞ্চুগঞ্জ
- Upazila
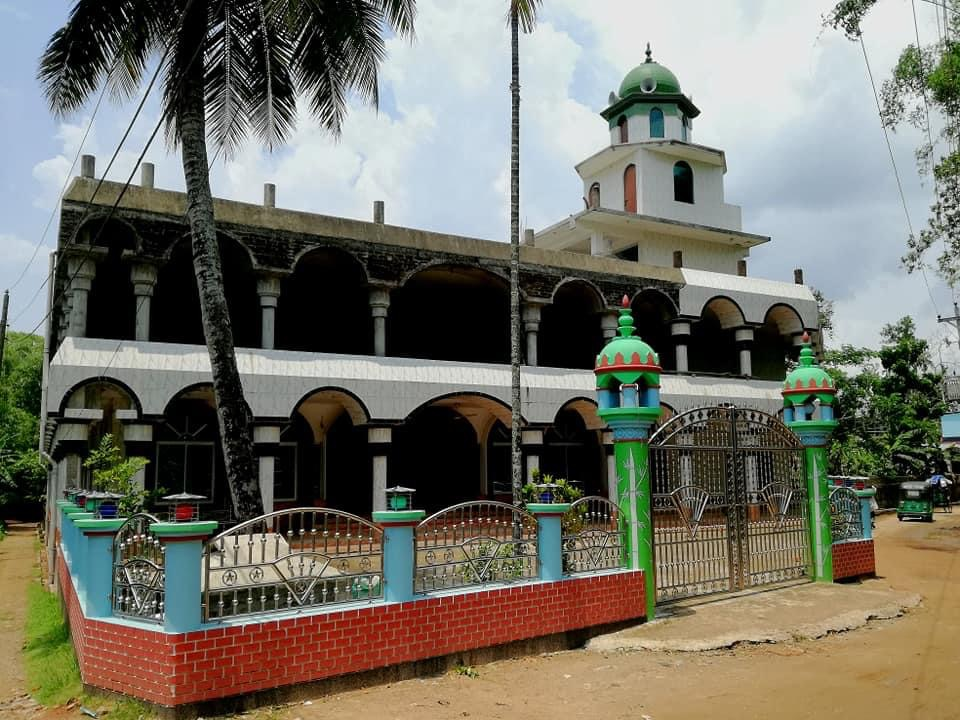
- Islampur Jame Mosque in Islampur, Fenchuganj

- Country: Bangladesh
- Division: Sylhet
- District: Sylhet

Government
  - MP (Sylhet-3): Mohammad Abdul Malik
  - Upazila Chairman: Kazi Md Bodrudduza

Area
  - Total: 114.09 km^{2} (44.05 sq mi)

Population (2022)
  - Total: 114,293
  - Density: 1,001.8/km^{2} (2,594.6/sq mi)
- Demonym: Fenchuganji
- Time zone: UTC+6 (BST)
- Postal code: 3116
- Area code: 08226
- Website: fenchuganj.sylhet.gov.bd

Fenchuganj Upazila mauza geocode map

Fenchuganj (Bengali: ফেঞ্চুগঞ্জ) is an upazila of Sylhet District in Sylhet Division, Bangladesh.

== Administration ==
Fenchuganj Upazila is divided into five union councils. The five unions are further subdivided into 29 mouzas and 89 villages:

1. Fenchuganj Sadar: Fenchuganj, Islampur, Qazibari, Rajanpur, Pathantila, Mughalpur, K. M. Tillah, Chhattish, Nij Chhattish, Nowa Tillah, Tafadar Tillah, Golagat, Pitaitikar, Baghmara
2. Maijgaon: Kachuabahar, Karmadha, Nizampur, Faridpur, Nurpur, Moinpur, Fakirpara, Maijgaon, Kayasthagram, Puran Bazar
3. Ghilachhara: Manipur, Mahurapur, Moomin Cherra, Dalichhara, Ashighar, Nij Ghilachhara, Judhistipur, Badedeuli, Dharon, Gazipur, Barabari, Qurbanpur, Mirzapur, Jafarabad
4. Uttar Kushiara: Danaram, Rokanpur, Noagaon, Narayanpur, Chanpur, Ilashpur, Salehpur, Purbakandi, Gazipur, Khilpara, Dinpur, Atghar, Konapara, Katalpur, Dandi, Majhpara, Muhipur, Terakuri, Fakirpara
5. Uttar Fenchuganj: Mallickpur, Kutubpur, Lamagangapur, Gayasi, Ujangangapur, Sultanpur, Manikkona, Khatkhal (Bhelkona), Surikandi, Shailkandi

== Demographics ==
Religions in Fenchuganj Upazila (2022)
Religion	Percent
Islam	88.79%
Hinduism	11.20%
Other or not stated	0.01%

As of the 2022 Bangladeshi census, Fenchuganj Upazila had 22,620 households and a population of 114,293. 9.34% of the population were under 5 years of age. Fenchuganj had a literacy rate (age 7 and over) of 80.18%: 81.84% for males and 78.71% for females, and a sex ratio of 89.98 males for every 100 females. 21,589 (18.89%) lived in urban areas.

According to the 2011 Census of Bangladesh, Fenchuganj Upazila had 18,859 households and a population of 104,741. 27,132 (25.90%) were under 10 years of age. Fenchuganj had a literacy rate (age 7 and over) of 50.47%, compared to the national average of 51.8%, and a sex ratio of 1051 females per 1000 males. 21,841 (20.85%) lived in urban areas. Ethnic population was 872 (0.83%).

According to the 1991 Bangladesh census, Fenchuganj had a population of 81,605. Males constituted 51.07% of the population, and females 48.93%. Fenchuganj had an average literacy rate of 39% (7+ years), and the national average of 32.4% literate. Religions: Muslim 88.72%, Hindu 11.25%, Buddhist and Christian 0.03%.

== Economy ==
Fenchuganj Upazila has seven power plants, two urea fertilizer factories, three tea gardens, three rubber gardens, one gas field, Hakaluki Haor (largest Haour in South Asia) and many more.

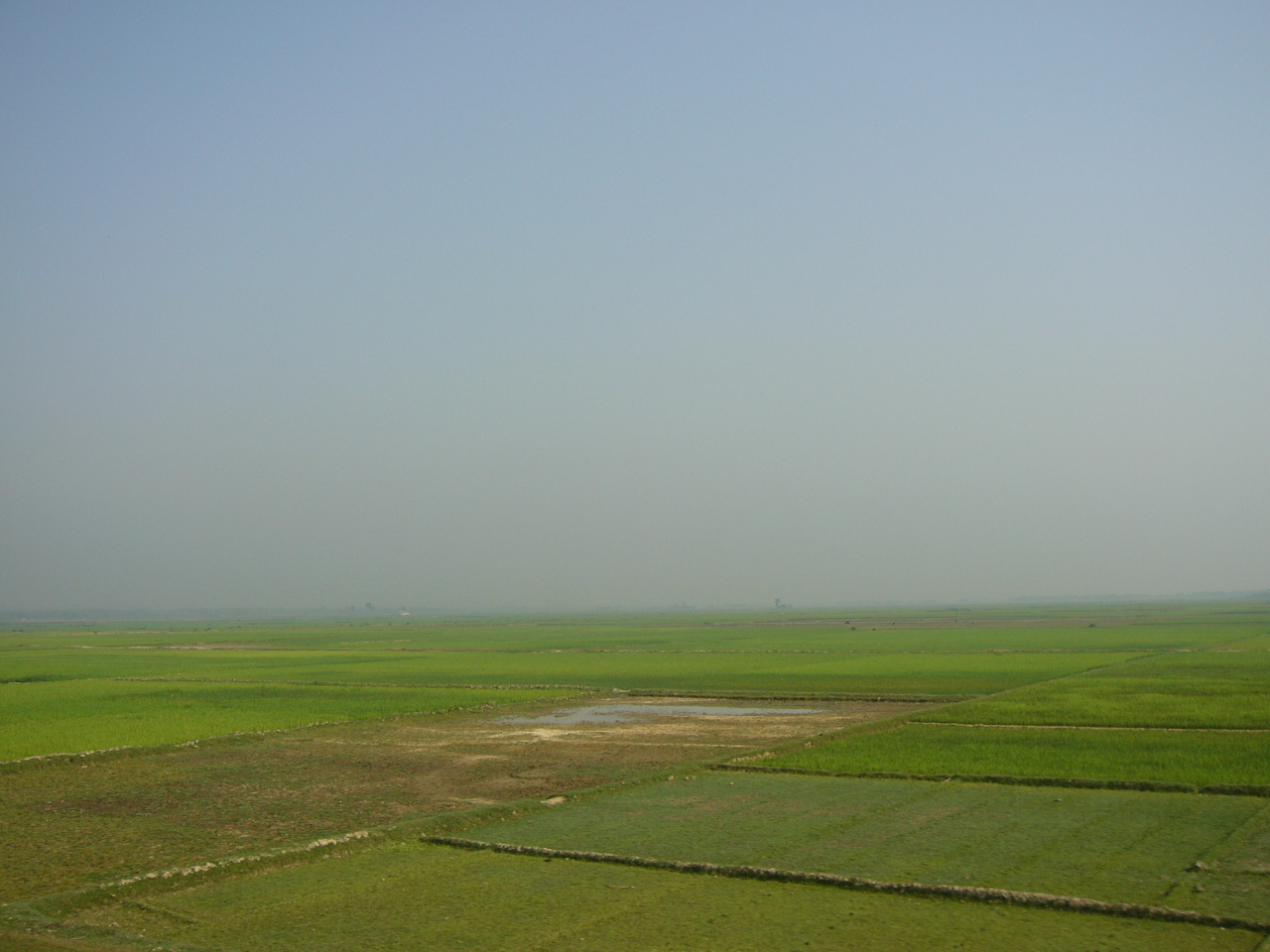
Hakaluki Haor, Fenchuganj

=== Farms and industries ===
Number	Details	Total
1	Fertiliser Factory	02
2	Power Plants	06
3	Gas Field	01
4	Tea Garden	02
5	Rubber Garden	03
6	Poultries Fishery	30
7	Dairy	18
8	Poultry	28

  - Fertilizer Factories are
- Natural Gas Fertilizer Factory Ltd. 1.6 km East of Tajmul Ali Chattar, Kochuabahar, Fenchuganj

(First fertilizer factory planted in Asia) (Producer: Ammonia, Ammonium sulphate, Urea)

- Shahjalal Fertilizer Factory Ltd 1.5 km East of Tajamul Ali Square (The biggest fertilizer factory planted in Bangladesh)
  - Power Plants are
- Fenchuganj Combined Cycle Gas (170 MW), Tajmul Ali Chattar-Jetyghat Rd
- Barakatullah Electro Dynamics Limited (51 MW), Tajmul Ali Square-Jetighat Rd
- Energy prima Ltd (50 MW), Tajmul Ali Chattar-Jetyghat Rd
- Liberty Power US (60 MW)
- Kushiara Power Plant Fenchuganj (50 MW), Tajmul Ali Chattar-Jetighat Rd
- Build Own Opora (BOO) 170 MW
  - Tea gardens are
- Monipur Tea Garden
- Muminchara Tea Garden
  - Gas field
- Fenchuganj Gas Field

== Etymology ==
There are many theories behind the naming of the upazila. Some say that Fenchuganj is named after Penchu (or Fenchui) Shah, a guardian of Shah Malum's dargah, who had a habit of sitting at the ghat of the Kushiyara River during the evening every day. One day, he decided to open up a shop in the ghat, which eventually expanded into Fenchuganj or Fenchu's neighbourhood.

== Geography ==
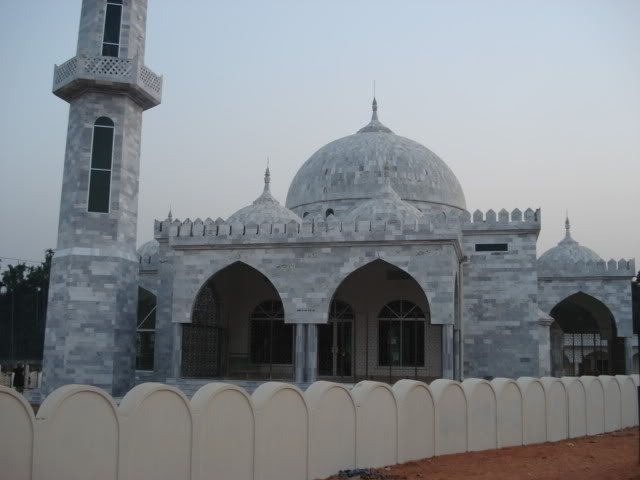
Delwar Hossain Chowdhury Jame Masjid in Nurpur, Fenchuganj.

Fenchuganj is located at 24.7083°N 91.9403°E. It has 18,859 households and total area 114.09 km^{2}. It is bordered by Golapganj Upazila to the north, Barlekha Upazila to the east, Kulaura and Rajnagar upazilas in the south via Tajmul Ali Chattar & Tajmul Ali Chattar-Maijgaon Rd and Balaganj Upazila to the west.

== History ==
After the Conquest of Gour in 1303, some disciples of Shah Jalal migrated and settled in present-day Fenchuganj where they preached Islam to the local people. Shah Malum and Shah Mohabbat migrated to Mahurapur/Mourapur.

In 1907, the Fenchuganj thana was established. Before 1907, it was a part of the Balaganj Thana. During the 1950 East Pakistan riots, the factory of a steamer company was looted and set on fire. Pulin De was murdered near Ilashpur village.Under Fenchuganj police station, the houses of Ambika Kabiraj and Makhan Sen were looted and set on fire.

On 23 March 1971, at the Fenchuganj Fertilizer Factory Police Camp, under the leadership of Sheikh Tajmul Ali Chairman, one of the key organizers of the Bangladesh War of Independence, the Pakistani flag was lowered and the flag of independent Bangladesh was hoisted.

During the war, the Pakistan army shot two gardeners at the gate of the Fenchuganj Fertiliser Factory in May 1971. The army then proceeded to the Manipuri Tea Garden, killing another two tea labourers. Dala Bridge (Ilash Pur) and Kaiyer Warehouse is recognised as a mass killing site during the war and the Ghilachhora Monument stands out to commemorate the tragedies of the war. In 1980, Fenchuganj Thana was upgraded to an upazila.

== Transport ==
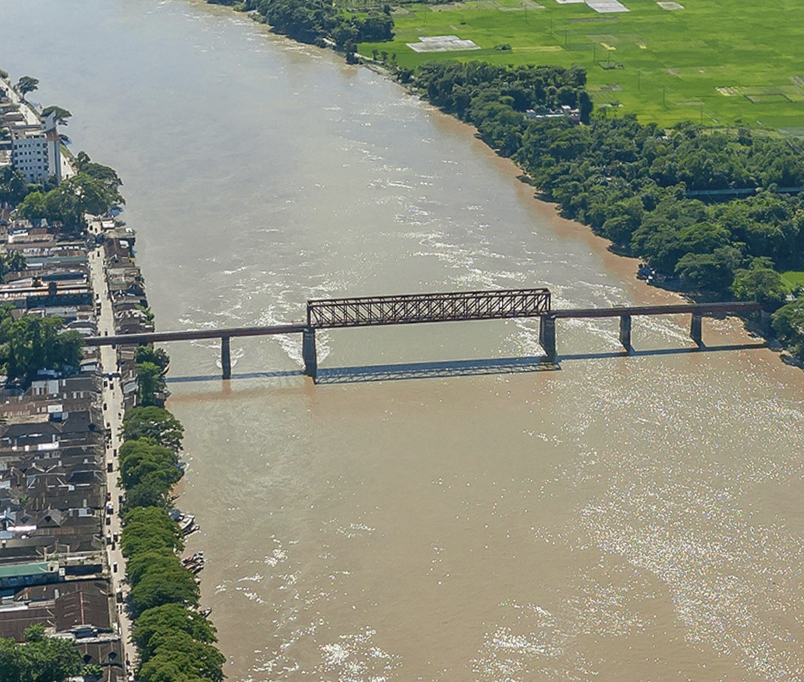
Fenchuganj Railway Bridge

Fenchuganj has good communication with the rest of the country thanks to its river, road and rail links. During British rule river and rail travel were popular, following that roads became more used, and more recently the A2 (Asian Highway) road built through Fenchuganj, connecting to the Sylhet-Dhaka highway and other parts of the country. Established there is a market place on the bank of the river Kushiara, with Tuesday and Saturday being the main trading days. People from the surrounding 10–15 miles (16–24 km) come to the market to trade and shop. Now, there are many local markets which sit every day. Among the views from Fenchuganj are the two bridges over Kushiara. The hills and the lake near Degree college, the fertiliser factory 1.5 km East of Tajamul Ali Square, several tea estates, Delwar Hussain mosque, sunset from ilashpur (dhala) bridge and the boat trip down the river are very enjoyable.

== Education ==
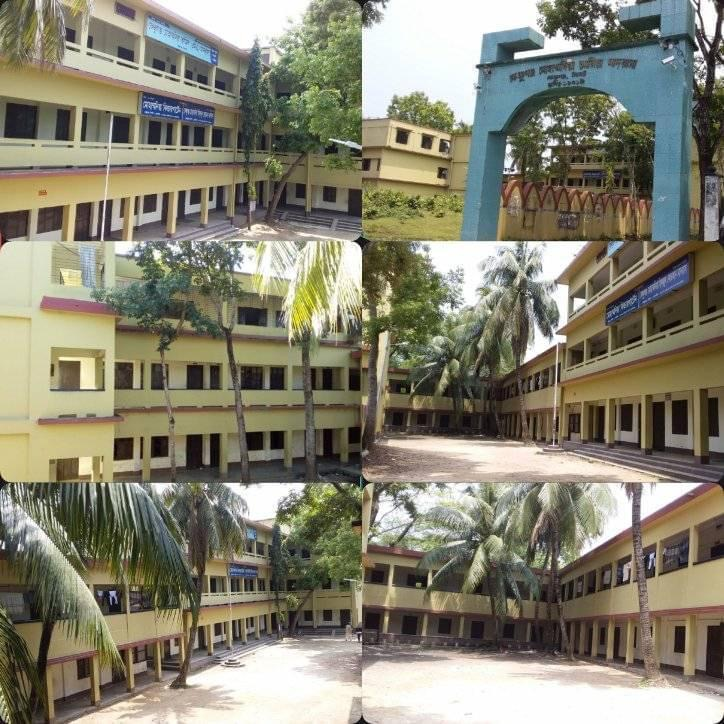
The Fenchuganj Mohammadia Kamil Madrasha established in 1971.

Fenchugonj Upazila is performing 5.6% above the Bangladesh national average in education. The average rate of education is 68% in Fenchuganj. There are many educational institutions some of these are,

=== Education ===
Number	Details	Total
1	Mosques	131
2	High Schools	5
3	Junior high school	02
4	Colleges	04
5	Primary School (government)	36
6	Primary School (Private)	05
7	Madrasah (Alia)	02
8	Madrasah (Dakhil)	04
9	Qaumi Madrasah	18
10	Kindergarten school	09
11	Business Management College	1
13	Girls Schools	02
14	Boys schools	01

  - Colleges are
- Fenchuganj Govt College
- Fenchuganj Business Management College
- Mahmud us Samad Farzana Chowdhury Girls School and College
- ManikKuna high school and college
  - Schools are
- Kasim Ali Model High School
- Fariza Khatun Girls High school
- Mahmud us Samad Farzana Chowdhury Girls high School
- PPM (Puran Bazar Public Model) High School
- NGFF (Natural Gas Fertiliser Factory ltd) School
- Syed Riyasod Ali high school
- Donaram high school
- Uttar Kushiara High School
- Manikkuna high school
- Syed Afruz Firuz Academy
- Hero Child pre-cadet Academy
- Ghilachora high school
- Jomirun Nessa Academy
  - Madrasas are
- Fenchuganj Mohammadia Kamil Madrasha
- Hatuvanga Darussunna Dakhil Madrsah
- Ishak Ali madrasha
- Moshahid Ali Mohila Madrasha
- khil para madrasha

== See also ==
- Hakaluki Haor
- Nurpur, Fenchuganj
