= Ficus morifolia =

Ficus morifolia can refer to:

- Ficus morifolia Forssk., a synonym of Ficus palmata Forssk.
- Ficus morifolia Lam., a synonym of Ficus lateriflora Vahl
- Ficus morifolia Vahl, a synonym of Ficus assamica Miq.
