= Nurpur, Fenchuganj =

Place in Sylhet, Bangladesh

Nurpur নুরপুর
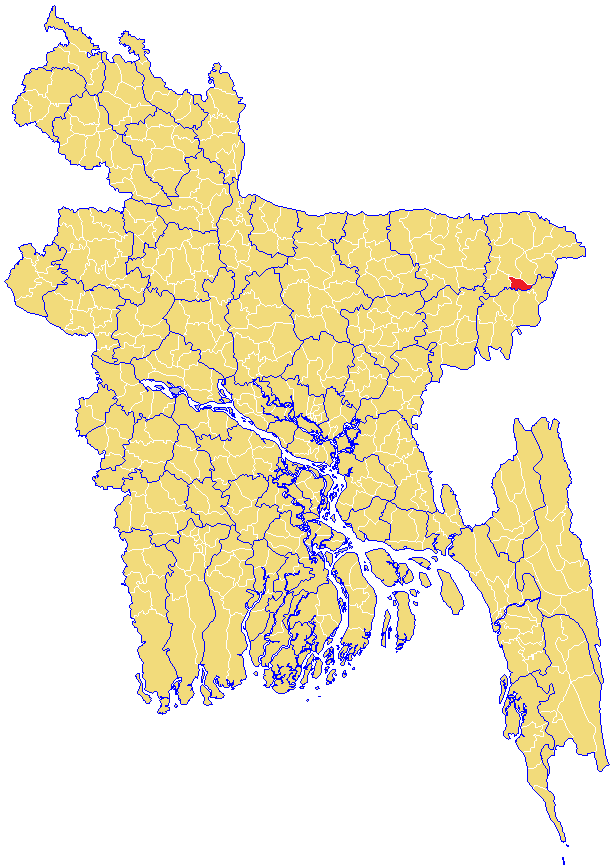
- Coordinates: 22°17′N 90°3′E
- Country: Bangladesh
- Division: Sylhet
- District: Sylhet
- Upazila: Fenchuganj Upazila
- Established: 810

Government
  - MP: Mahmud Us Samad Chowdhury
  - Chairman: Sufianul Karim Chowdhury
  - Social Worker: Muhammad Numan Miah

Area
  - City: 4 km^{2} (1.5 sq mi)

Population
  - City: 8,000
  - Density: 2,000/km^{2} (5,200/sq mi)
  - Urban: 6,000
  - Urban density: 1,300/km^{2} (3,400/sq mi)
- Time zone: UTC+6 (Bangladesh Time)
- Postal code: 3116
- Website: http://www.facebook.com/Nurpurfenchuganj

Nurpur is a village at Fenchuganj Upazila in Sylhet, Bangladesh. It is about four miles long and 3 miles wide. It is the biggest village in Fenchuganj Upazila. It is not far from Upazila and Police Station.

== Populations and Religious ==
Nearly ten thousand people live in Nurpur. The population is majority Muslim, but there is a small Hindu population as well.

== Education ==
Number	Details	Total
1.	Mosques	07
2	Primary School (Government)	02
3	Kindergarten	01
4	High School (Girls)	01
5	College	02

  - Colleges
- Mahmud Us Samad Farjana Chowdhury Girls School and College
- Fenchuganj Business Management College
  - Primary schools
- Dorgahpur Primary School
- Faqirpara Community School
  - Madrasahs
- Asiya Khanom Hafizia Madrasah.
- Darul Ulum Islambazar Madrasah.

== Mosques ==
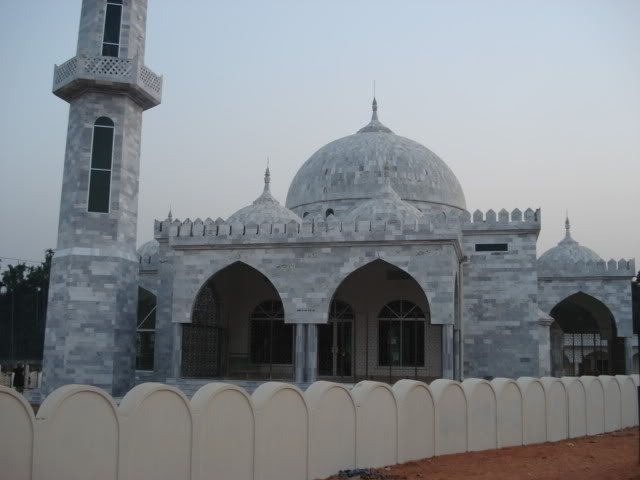
Delwar Hossain Chowdhury Jame Masjid, Nurpur

- Delwar Hussain Jam-E Masjid
- Nurpur Jam-E Masjid
- Jummatila Jam-E Masjid
- Nurpur Bazari Tilla Jam-E Masjid
- Uttartila Jam-E Masjid
- Faqirpara Jam-E Masjid
- Faqirpara Panjegana Masjid etc.

== Leader ==
- Mahmud Us Samad Chowdhury MP
- Nurul Islam Basit U.P Chairman

== See also ==
- Fenchuganj Upazila
