= Sylhet-3 =

Constituency of Bangladesh's Jatiya Sangsad

Coordinates: 24.82°N 91.90°E

- Constituency for the Jatiya Sangsad
- District: Sylhet District
- Division: Sylhet Division
- Electorate: 416,000 (2026)

Current constituency
- Created: 1973
- Party: Bangladesh Nationalist Party
- Member: Mohammad Abdul Malek
- ← 230 Sylhet-2 232 Sylhet-4 →

Sylhet-3 is a constituency represented in the Jatiya Sangsad (National Parliament) of Bangladesh since 2026 by Mohammad Abdul Malek of the Bangladesh Nationalist Party.

== Boundaries ==
The constituency encompasses Balaganj, Dakshin Surma, and Fenchuganj upazilas.

== History ==
The constituency was created for the first general elections in newly independent Bangladesh, held in 1973.

Ahead of the 2008 general election, the Election Commission redrew constituency boundaries to reflect population changes revealed by the 2001 Bangladesh census. The 2008 redistricting altered the boundaries of the constituency.

Ahead of the 2018 general election, the Election Commission expanded the boundaries of the constituency by adding eleven union parishads of Balaganj Upazila: Balaganj, Boaljur, Burunga Bazar, Dayamir, Boula Bazar, Omarpur, Osmanpur, Paschim Pailanpur, Purba Pailanpur, Sadipur, and Tajpur.

== Members of Parliament ==
Election	Member	Party
1973	Abdur Rais	Awami League
1979	Dewan Shamsul Abedin	Bangladesh Nationalist Party
Major Boundary Changes
1986	Mohammad Habibur Rahman	Jatiya Party
1988	Abdul Mukit Khan	Jatiya Party
1991	Abdul Mukit Khan	Jatiya Party
Feb 1996	Shafi Ahmad Chowdhury	Bangladesh Nationalist Party
Jun 1996	Abdul Mukit Khan	Jatiya Party
2001	Shafi Ahmad Chowdhury	Bangladesh Nationalist Party
2008	Mahmud Us Samad Chowdhury	Awami League
2014	Mahmud Us Samad Chowdhury	Awami League
Major Boundary Changes
2018	Mahmud Us Samad Chowdhury	Awami League
Sep 2021 by-election	Habibur Rahman Habib	Awami League
2024	Habibur Rahman Habib	Awami League
2026	Mohammad Abdul Malek	Bangladesh Nationalist Party

== Elections ==
=== Elections in the 2020s ===
General Election 2026: Sylhet-3 (Note: The results given by The Business Standard are incomplete.)
Party	Candidate	Votes	%	±%
BNP	Mohammad Abdul Malek	115,450	57.8	N/A
Bangladesh Khelafat Majlis	Musleh Uddin Raju	75,674	37.9	N/A
Independent	Mostakim Raja Chowdhury	4,199	2.1	N/A
JP(E)	Mohammad Atiqur Rahman	2,630	1.3	N/A
IAB	Redwanul Haque Chowdhury	1,391	0.7	N/A
Independent	Moinul Bakar	297	0.1	N/A
Majority		39,778	19.9	N/A
Turnout		199,641	48.0	N/A
Registered electors		416,000		
BNP gain from AL				

=== Elections in the 2010s ===
Mahmud Us Samad Chowdhury was re-elected unopposed in the 2014 general election after opposition parties withdrew their candidacies in a boycott of the election.

=== Elections in the 2000s ===
General Election 2008: Sylhet-3
Party	Candidate	Votes	%	±%
AL	Mahmud Us Samad Chowdhury	97,593	53.5	+16.1
BNP	Shafi Ahmed Choudhury	54,955	30.1	−17.1
JP(E)	Atiqur Rahman Atique	17,674	9.7	N/A
Independent	Abdul Quiyum Choudhury	12,042	6.6	N/A
JSD	Syed Habibur Rahman Hiron	212	0.1	−0.1
Majority		42,638	23.4	+13.6
Turnout		182,476	85.2	+12.1
AL gain from BNP				

General Election 2001: Sylhet-3
Party	Candidate	Votes	%	±%
BNP	Shafi Ahmed Chowdhury	55,994	47.2	+18.9
AL	Mahmud Us Samad Chowdhury	44,342	37.4	+8.6
IJOF	Abdul Mukit Khan	15,402	13.0	N/A
Ganatantri Party	Subal Chandra Pal	1,400	1.2	N/A
Independent	Mostafa Allama	362	0.3	N/A
KSJL	Md. Badsha Mia	345	0.3	N/A
Independent	Alauddin Ahmed	298	0.3	N/A
JSD	Siddiqur Rahman	242	0.2	N/A
Independent	Md. Mahbubur Rahman	124	0.1	N/A
Independent	Md. Rashedul Hossain	84	0.1	N/A
Majority		11,652	9.8	+9.3
Turnout		118,593	73.1	+3.1
BNP gain from JP(E)				

=== Elections in the 1990s ===
General Election June 1996: Sylhet-3
Party	Candidate	Votes	%	±%
JP(E)	Abdul Mukit Khan	26,659	29.3	−9.1
AL	Mahmud Us Samad Chowdhury	26,168	28.8	+6.9
BNP	Shafi Uddin Ahmed Chowdhury	25,954	28.6	+8.5
Jamaat	Abdul Basit	6,755	7.4	−2.1
Sammilita Sangram Parishad	Md. Rafiqul Islam Khan	2,693	3.0	N/A
IOJ	Alauddin Ahmed	790	0.9	N/A
Zaker Party	Azmat Hossain	762	0.8	N/A
Jamiat Ulema-e-Islam Bangladesh	Zakaria Masuk	414	0.5	N/A
WPB	Shafiq Ahmed	325	0.4	N/A
FP	Fayzul Alam Babul	140	0.2	N/A
Jatiya Samajtantrik Dal-JSD	M. A. Qayum Chowdhury	138	0.2	−0.6
BKA	Idris Ahmed Zakaria	81	0.1	N/A
Majority		491	0.5	−16.0
Turnout		90,879	70.0	+18.3
JP(E) hold				

General Election 1991: Sylhet-3
Party	Candidate	Votes	%	±%
JP(E)	Abdul Mukit Khan	33,416	38.4	
AL	Atiqur Rahman Atique	19,057	21.9	
BNP	Shafi Uddin Ahmed Chowdhury	17,470	20.1	
Jamaat	Abdul Basit	8,296	9.5	
Independent	Mahmud Us Samad Chowdhury	7,095	8.1	
Jatiya Janata Party (Hafizur)	Abul Kalam Azad	721	0.8	
JSD	Saifur Razzak	532	0.6	
Jatiya Samajtantrik Dal-JSD	Md. Abdun Nur	489	0.6	
Majority		14,359	16.5	
Turnout		87,076	51.7	
JP(E) hold				
