= Shah Malum =

Shah Ma'lum

Personal life
- Born: Gujarat
- Died: 2–4 January Rajonpur, Fenchuganj, Sylhet District, Bangladesh
- Other name: Junayd Gujarati (Junaid of Gujarat)

Religious life
- Religion: Islam

Muslim leader
- Based in: Fenchuganj
- Post: Companion of Shah Jalal
- Period in office: Early 14th century

Junayd Gujarati (Gujarati: જુનૈદ ગુજરાતી, Bengali: জুনায়েদ গুজরাটি), popularly known as Shāh Ma'lūm (Arabic: شاه معلوم, Bengali: শাহ মালুম) was a 14th-century Sufi Muslim figure in the Sylhet region. Ma'lum's name is associated with the propagation of Islam and establishment of Muslim rule in Fenchuganj. In 1303, he took part in the Conquest of Sylhet which was led by Shah Jalal. Following the conquest, he established a khanqah in Mahurapur Pargana (now Rajonpur in Fenchuganj Upazila).

== Life ==
Junayd was born in Gujarat, India in the 13th century. During Shah Jalal's expedition towards the Indian subcontinent from Hadhramaut in Yemen, Shah Jalal passed through the state of Gujarat under Delhi Sultanate governed by Ulugh Khan under the Sultan of Delhi, Alauddin Khalji. During his time with Shah Jalal, Junaid earned the title Shah Ma'lum for his intelligence, general knowledge and guidance before and during the Conquest of Sylhet in 1303.

== Death and legacy ==
It is unclear how and when he died, but he is buried in a mazar near his khanqah, opposite the Fenchuganj Railway line in Rajonpur. For centuries, large numbers of devotees have been visiting his tomb, a practice which continues even today. On 2, 3 and 4 January, the urs of Shah Ma'lum takes place.

According to legend, Fenchuganj Upazila is named after Fenchu Shah, the guardian of Malum's dargah, who had a habit of sitting at the ghat of the Kushiyara River every evening. One day, he decided to open up a shop at the ghat, which eventually expanded into Fenchuganj or Fenchu's neighbourhood.

There is a South Asian cuisine restaurant in Palermo, Italy named after Shah Malum. It is notable as the only Indian takeaway in the province.
