= Shahjalal Fertiliser Factory =

Bangladeshi fertiliser company

Shahjalal Fertiliser Factory Ltd.
- Company type: Public
- Industry: Fertiliser
- Founded: 1 July 2011; 14 years ago
- Founder: Bangladesh Chemical Industries Corporation Ltd. (BCIC)
- Headquarters: NGFF, Fenchuganj, Sylhet, Bangladesh
- Area served: Asia, Africa, Europe
- Key people: Raju Ahmed Munna (president); Mahdi Hassan (general secretary)
- Products: Urea
- Website: www.sfcl.gov.bd

The Shahjalal Fertiliser Factory is one of the biggest fertiliser factories in Bangladesh. It is situated at NGFF, Fenchuganj Upazila in Sylhet. The project was inaugurated by Bangladeshi Ex. prime minister Sheikh Hasina.

== History ==
Bangladesh Chemical Industries Corporation (BCIC), the largest corporation in industrial sector in the country was established in 1976 vide second amendment of P.0.27 upon merger of Bangladesh Paper and Board Corporation, Bangladesh Fetter, Chemical and Pharmaceutical Corporation and Bangladesh Tanneries Corporation. As present thirteen enterprises of BCIC are in operation out of which six are urea fertiliser factories. The total installed capacities of the above six urea fatter factories are 2.30 million Mt per annum. Due to ageing the production capacities of six urea fatter factories have been already decreased. Presently the demand of urea fester in the misty is about 3 million MT per annum. This demand is increasing day by day. To meet the growing demand of urea fertiliser, steps have been taken by the Govt. of Bangladesh (GOB) to set up a modern technology based, energy efficient and environment friendly granular urea fertiliser factory named Shahjalal Fertilizer Project (SFP) with an annual capacity of 580,800 MT at Fenchuganj.

It was hoped, the factory will be run as Commercial Operation from January 2016. After completion of construction of SFP, import of about 580,800 MT. of urea fertiliser will be decreased in a year, as a result, an equivalent amount foreign currency will be saved. Besides, food security will be ensured as a result of application of urea fertiliser produced in the factory and the produced fertiliser will play a supportive role in food production.
