= Dilwar Khan =

Bangladeshi poet

- দিলওয়ার
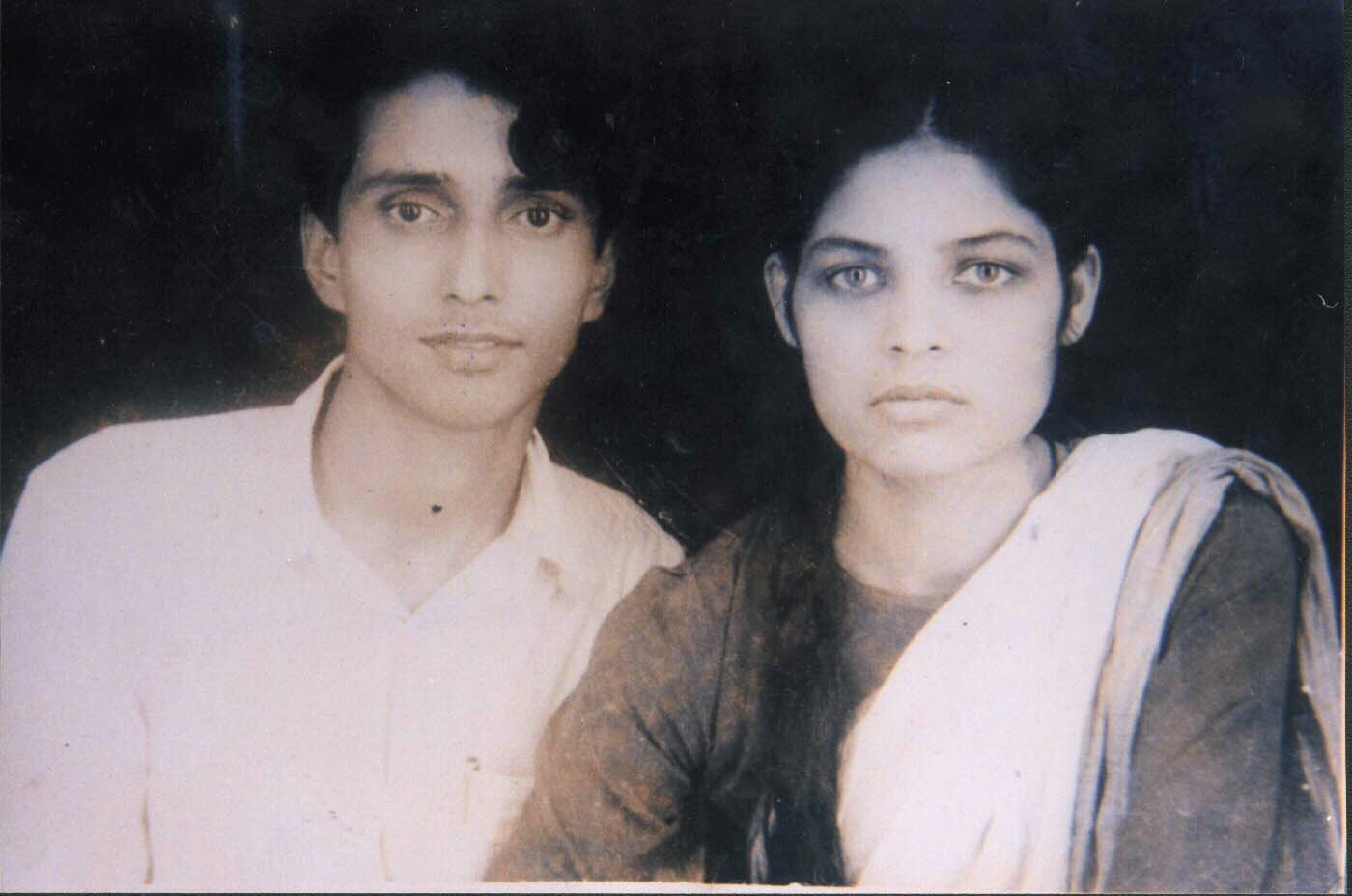
- Dilwar with first wife Anisa Khatun
- Born: 1 January 1937; Bharthokhola, South Surma, Bengal Presidency, British India (now in Bangladesh)
- Died: 10 October 2013 (aged 76); Bharthokhola, South Surma, Sylhet District, Bangladesh
- Awards: Bangla Academy Literary Award (1980); Ekushey Padak (2008)

Dilwar Khan (1 January 1937 – 10 October 2013) was a Bangladeshi poet. Known as Gono Manusher Kobi (poet of the mass people), he was awarded Bangla Academy Literary Award in 1980 and Ekushey Padak in 2008 by the Government of Bangladesh.

== Early life and career ==
Khan was born in Bharthokhola, South Surma, Sylhet District, Bengal Presidency. He received a Bangla Academy Fellowship in 1981. Khan died on 10 October 2013.
