= Mahmud Us Samad Chowdhury =

Bangladeshi politician (1955–2021)

- মাহমুদ উস সামাদ চৌধুরী

Member of Parliament for Sylhet-3
- In office 29 December 2008 – 11 March 2021
- Preceded by: Shafi Ahmad Chowdhury
- Succeeded by: Habibur Rahman Habib

Personal details
- Born: 3 January 1955; Sylhet District, East Bengal, Dominion of Pakistan
- Died: 11 March 2021 (aged 66); Dhaka, Bangladesh
- Resting place: Nurpur, Fenchuganj, Sylhet District, Bangladesh
- Political party: Bangladesh Awami League
- Occupation: Politician, businessperson

Mahmud Us Samad Chowdhury (3 January 1955 – 11 March 2021) was a Bangladesh Awami League politician and a Jatiya Sangsad member representing the Sylhet-3 constituency for three terms.

== Early life ==
Chowdhury was born on 3 January 1955 in Nurpur, Fenchuganj to Delwar Hossain Chowdhury and Asiya Khanom Chowdhury. He was the sixth of seven brothers and had four elder sisters. The wider family mostly reside in UK and US. He had an MBA degree, which he obtained from a university in the UK.

== Career ==
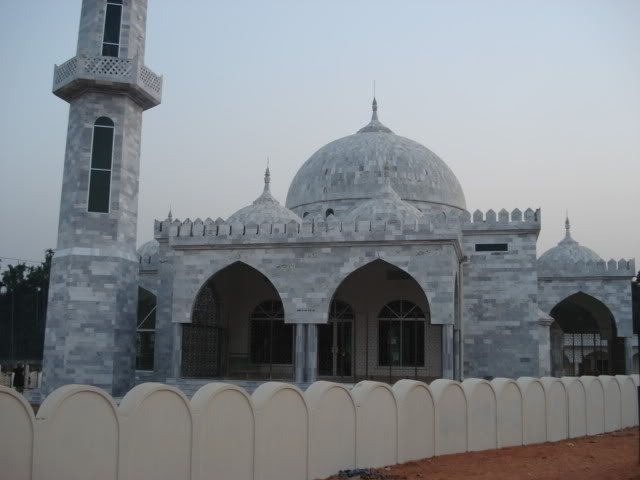
Chowdhury built the Delwar Hossain Chowdhury Jame Mosque in Nurpur, named after his father.

Chowdhury was elected to parliament from Sylhet-3 on 5 January 2014 as an Awami League candidate. He was a member of Bangladesh Garment Manufacturers and Exporters Association. Chowdhury also served as the vice-president of the Awami League's Sylhet District unit.

== Death ==
After contracting COVID-19, during the COVID-19 pandemic in Bangladesh, Chowdhury was taken to United Hospital, Dhaka where he died on 11 March 2021. A Bangladesh Air Force helicopter later took his body to his home upazila of Fenchuganj, landing at the Natural Gas Fertiliser Factory playground. Thereafter, an ambulance transported him to his residence, the Nurpur Borobari, and his janaza was conducted at Kasim Ali Model High School. He was then buried in his family graveyard in Nurpur.
