= Shafi Ahmed Chowdhury =

Bangladeshi businessman and politician

Shafi Ahmed Chowdhury Al-Qureshi
- শফি আহমেদ চৌধুরী আল-কুরেশী

Sylhet-3 Jatiya Sangsad
- In office Feb 1996 – Jun 1996
- Preceded by: Abdul Mukit Khan
- Succeeded by: Abdul Mukit Khan
- In office 2001–2006
- Preceded by: Abdul Mukit Khan
- Succeeded by: Mahmud Us Samad Chowdhury

Personal details
- Born: 1 September 1938 (age 87) Dakshin Surma
- Party: Bangladesh Nationalist Party

Shafi Ahmed Chowdhury Al-Qureshi (Born: 1 September 1938) is a Bangladeshi businessman and politician. He is a two-time Member of Parliament elected from Sylhet-3 seat in the Bangladesh National Parliamentary Election. He was elected a member of the Jatiya Sangsad in the February 1996 elections and the October 2001 elections.

== Birth and early life ==
Shafi Ahmed Chowdhury Al-Qureshi (Short form Shafi Chowdhury) born into a Bengali Muslim family in Renga Daudpur of South Surma of Sylhet District, Bangladesh.

== Career ==
In his personal life he is a businessman.

== Political life ==
He participated in all the elections from that 1986 year. He did not join 2014 Election the party in the decision. elected a member of the Jatiya Sangsad in the February 1996 elections and the October 2001 elections. He was defeated in the 1986, 1991, June 1996, 2008 and 2018 election.

== See also ==
- February 1996 Bangladeshi general election
- 2001 Bangladeshi general election
