= Kasim Ali Model High School =

- কাসিম আলি মডেল উচ্চবিদ্যালয়

Location
- Fenchuganj, Sylhet; Bangladesh
- Coordinates: 24.6949°N 91.9499°E

Information
- Type: Public
- Established: 1915
- Enrollment: 2500
- Campus: Urban

Kasim Ali Model High School (Bengali: কাসিম আলি মডেল উচ্চবিদ্যালয়) is a secondary school situated in the Rajonpur area of Fenchuganj Upazila, Sylhet District, Bangladesh. The school is accredited by the Board of Intermediate and Secondary Education, Sylhet. It offers study in the fields of science, humanities and business studies.

== History ==
Founded in 1915, it is the first and oldest high school in Fenchuganj and one of the oldest schools in Bangladesh. The school celebrated its 100th anniversary on 26 and 27 December 2015. The anniversary was also celebrated by alumni in the United States.

The public janaza of politician Mahmud Us Samad Chowdhury was conducted at the school in March 2021.
