= 1956 East Pakistan provincial by-election =

- 10 December 1956
- 7 seats in the East Pakistan Provincial Assembly
Party	Leader	Vote %	Seats	+/–
AL	Abdul Hamid Khan		5	
UF	Abu Hossain Sarkar		1	
PNC	Basanta Kumar Das		1	
This lists parties that won seats. See the complete results below.
Chief Minister
Ataur Rahman Khan; AL

A by-election was held on 10 December 1956 in East Pakistan for seven seats in the provincial assembly. This was the first by-election after the 1954 provincial election, with candidates from six political parties participating.

== Background ==
In the 1949 by-election for the Tangail South constituency, Shamsul Huq, an activist of Pakistan Muslim League (PML), ran as an independent candidate against PML candidate Khurram Khan Panni and defeated him. However, the election tribunal annulled the by-election. Following the election, Huq, along with several other members of the PML, formed the East Pakistan Awami Muslim League (abbreviated as AL, later renamed as the East Pakistan Awami League). Alarmed by the result of that by-election, the government of East Pakistan refrained from organizing any by-elections for the 35 vacant seats in the province until 1954. Ahead of the 1954 provincial election, the AL, Krishak Sramik Party (KSP), Nizam-e-Islam Party (NIP), and Ganatantri Dal (GD) formed an alliance known as the United Front (UF) on 4 December 1953. The alliance issued a 21-point manifesto, the final point of which included a promise to organize a by-election within every three months of a provincial seat becoming vacant. In the 1954 election, the UF won 228 seats, while the ruling PML won only 10, suffering a major defeat. After the election, the UF led two cabinet named Third Huq and later the First Abu Hussain Sarkar ministry assumed control of the province. Eventually, the AL withdrew from the UF, and in 1956, the party formed the First Ataur ministry. The provincial government then decided to organize by-elections for the 7 vacant seats and began preparations accordingly.

== Nominations ==
The by-election was held in the constituencies of Brahmanbaria South-East, Munshiganj Central-East, Pirojpur North-East, Pirojpur West, North Sylhet Central-West, Bhola North-West, and Satkhira (scheduled castes) in East Pakistan. In this by-election, the AL contested in 6 constituencies, the PML in 5, the KSP in 2, the NIP in 1, the GD in 1, and the Pakistan National Congress (PNC) in 1 constituency. Additionally, five independent candidates participated in the election. Jagadish Chandra Bala was the PNC candidate in Satkhira who was supported by the AL. On the other hand, Aftabuddin Ahmad withdrew his candidacy from the Pirojpur West constituency.

== Results ==
Party	Votes	%	Seats
AL	57,628	60.74	5
NIP	8,934	9.42	1
PNC			1
PML	24,037	25.34	0
KSP	965	1.02	0
GD			0
Independent	3,310	3.49	0
Total	94,874	100.00	7
Source: The Azad

In the by-election, the AL won 5 seats, the NIP won 1 seat, and the PNC won 1 seat.

Constituency	Winner	Party		
Constituency	Winner	Brahmanbaria South-East (Muslim)	Abdul Gani Munshi	AL
Munshiganj Central-East (Muslim)	Badshah Miah		AL	
Pirojpur North-East (Muslim)	Zainul Abedin		AL	
Pirojpur West (Muslim)	Nuruddin Ahmad		AL	
North Sylhet Central-West (Muslim)	Habibur Rahman		AL	
Bhola North-West (Muslim)	Motiur Rahman Shah		NIP	
Satkhira (scheduled castes)	Jagadish Chandra Bala		PNC	

== Aftermath ==
According to politician Oli Ahad, by organizing the by-election, the AL was able to fulfill one of its electoral promises as former member of the UF. Additionally, the AL won most of the seats in the by-election as its cabinet successfully managed the food crisis. However, Maulvi Tamizuddin Khan, president of the East Pakistan branch of the PML, alleged electoral fraud in the by-election. In response, Sheikh Mujibur Rahman, general secretary of the AL and provincial minister of industries and commerce, denied the allegations. Rahman asserted that freedom of expression had not been suppressed during the by-election, the Security Act had not been enforced, no political workers were arrested, and there was no evidence of rigging.
