= Fenchuganj Combined Cycle Power Plant =

Power plant in Bangladesh

Fenchuganj Power Station
- Country: Bangladesh
- Coordinates: 24.686°N 91.918°E
- Commission date: 1994
- Owner: Bangladesh Power Development Board
- Operator: Bangladesh Power Development Board

Thermal power station
- Primary fuel: Natural gas

Power generation
- Nameplate capacity: 201 MW

Fenchuganj Combined Cycle Power Plant or Fenchuganj Combined Cycle Gas (Bengali: ফেঞ্চুগঞ্জ কম্বাইন্ড সাইকল গ্যাস) also known as Fenchuganj Power Plant is a gas-turbine and steam turbine based power station in Fenchuganj Upazila, Sylhet District of Bangladesh. This station is governed by Bangladesh Power Development Board.

== Geography ==
Fenchuganj Power Plant is located at 24.41°N 91.55°E. It is situated on the west side of Jetighat beside Sylhet-Moulvibazar Road. It stands on 2 km west of the Fenchuganj Bridge comprising a land of 33.5 acres on the bank of Kushiyara River.

== History ==
Fenchuganj power plant was built in 1994 with a capacity of 90 MW. It started operation with two gas turbine generators (each of 30 MW) and a steam turbine (30 MW) respectively. It is also called Fenchuganj 90 MW power plant as it supplied 90 MW from the beginning. This Power Plant is the first ever combined cycle power station in the country.

== See also ==
- Electricity sector in Bangladesh
- Energy policy of Bangladesh
- List of power stations in Bangladesh
