= Ecologically Critical Area =

Environmental protection zone in Bangladesh

An Ecologically Critical Area (ECA) is an environmental protection zone in Bangladesh. In 1995, specific areas in Bangladesh could be deemed Ecologically Critical Areas as a result of the Environmental Conservation Act.

Bangladesh has a wide variety of ecosystems that include over 300 rivers that creates marine and fresh water environments. There are a multitude of areas that have been considered ECAs. Cox's Bazar is on the border of Bangladesh and Myanmar in the southeast corner of Bangladesh. The Teknaf Peninsula is 80 km of sandy beach and holds a variety of species as one of the longest beaches in the world. The Sonadia Islands are home to some of the last mangrove forests that house distinct species that can tolerate the high salinity of the mangrove forests in this area. The Sundarbans also contain mangrove forests and was named an ECA because it continues to suffer from over-exploitation and illegal urban development. St. Martin's Island is known for its coral-algal that overwhelms its rocky reefs. The island is a refuge for globally threatened marine species. Finally, the Hakaluki Haor found in greater Sylhet is an ECA because it has an extensive amount of wetland habitats that support a wide variety of life.

Gulshan-Baridhara Lake was declared an ECA in 2001. In September 2009, the four rivers around the capital city Dhaka—Buriganga River, Shitalakshya River, Turag River and Balu River—have been declared by the Department of Environment as ECAs. In 2012, Piyain River in Sylhet was declared as the 5th river to be an ECA.
