= Fenchuganj Gas Field =

Natural gas field in Bangladesh

Baramchal Gas Field
- Country: Bangladesh
- Region: Sylhet
- Offshore/onshore: onshore
- Operator: Bangladesh Petroleum Exploration and Production Company Limited (BAPEX)

Field history
- Discovery: 1990

Baramchal Gas Field (Bengali: বরমচাল গ্যাসক্ষেত্র) is a natural gas field located in Baramchal Union Parishad, Kulaura Upazila, Moulvibazar District, Sylhet Division, Bangladesh. This gas field is controlled by the state-owned Bangladesh Petroleum Exploration and Production Company Limited (BAPEX).

== See also ==
- List of natural gas fields in Bangladesh
- Bangladesh Gas Fields Company Limited
- Gas Transmission Company Limited
