= Abdul Mukit Khan =

Bangladeshi politician

- আবদুল মুকিত খান

Sylhet-3 Jatiya Sangsad
- In office 3rd
- In office 1988 – Feb 1996
- Preceded by: Mohammad Habibur Rahman
- Succeeded by: Shafi Ahmad Chowdhury
- In office June 1996 – 2001
- Preceded by: Shafi Ahmad Chowdhury
- Succeeded by: Shafi Ahmad Chowdhury

Personal details
- Born: Dakshin Surma, Sylhet, Bangladesh
- Party: Jatiya Party

Abdul Mukit Khan Bangladeshi politician. He is a 3rd time Member of Parliament elected from Sylhet-3 seat in the Bangladesh National Parliamentary Election. He was elected a member of Parliament the Jatiya Sangsad in the 1988 elections, 1991 elections and the June 1996 elections.

== Birth and early life ==
Abdul Mukit Khan was born in Dakshin Surma of Sylhet District, Bangladesh.

== Political life ==
Abdul Mukit Khan is a former MP and an influential leader of the Jatiya Party. He was elected a member of Parliament the Jatiya Sangsad in the 1988 elections, 1991 elections and the June 1996 elections.

== See also ==
- 1988 Bangladeshi general election
- 1991 Bangladeshi general election
- June 1996 Bangladeshi general election
