= Habibur Rahman Habib =

Bangladeshi politician

- হবীবুর রহমান হবীব

Member of the Bangladesh Parliament for Sylhet-3
- In office 4 September 2021 – 6 August 2024
- Preceded by: Mahmud Us Samad Chowdhury

Personal details
- Born: 27 November 1972 (age 53) Kamalbazar, Sylhet District, Bangladesh
- Party: Bangladesh Awami League
- Education: Murari Chand College

Habibur Rahman Habib (born 27 November 1972) is a Bangladeshi politician and a former member of Jatiya Sangsad representing the Sylhet-3 constituency.

== Early life and education ==
Habibur Rahman Habib was born on 27 November 1972 in the village of Kamalbazar in Sylhet District, Bangladesh. He completed his Bachelor of Arts from Murari Chand College. Habib moved to the United Kingdom in 1995.

== Career ==
Habib was involved in Chhatra League politics in 1986 when he was in eighth grade. He was the Acting General Secretary of the Jubo League's London branch and the Joint General Secretary of the United Kingdom Jubo League. Habib served as a member of the United Kingdom Awami League and Secretary of Relief and Social Welfare. He is a member of Sylhet District Awami League.

Habib was elected to parliament from Sylhet-3 on 4 September 2021 in a by-election as a candidate of Awami League. He had received 90,064 votes while his nearest rival, Atiqur Rahman Atiq of Jatiya Party, received 65,312 votes. The election had a low turnout. The by-election were called after the death of incumbent and Awami League politician Mahmud Us Samad Chowdhury on 11 March 2021. Later on 2024 Bangladeshi general election, he was re-elected as member of parliament from Sylhet-3 constituency.
