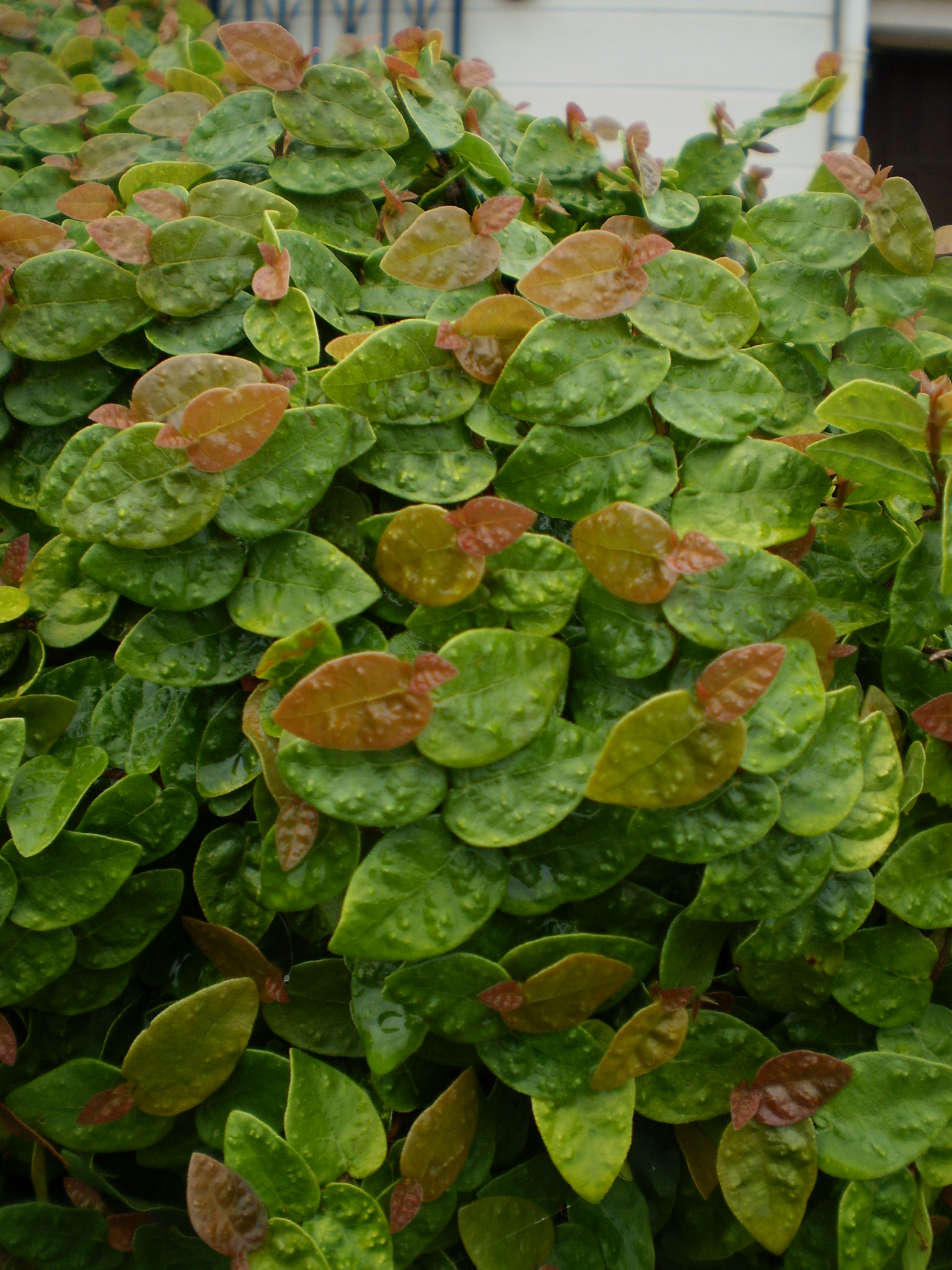

Scientific classification
- Kingdom: Plantae
- Clade: Embryophytes
- Clade: Tracheophytes
- Clade: Spermatophytes
- Clade: Angiosperms
- Clade: Eudicots
- Clade: Rosids
- Order: Rosales
- Family: Moraceae
- Genus: Ficus
- Species: F. assamica

Binomial name
- Ficus assamica Miq.

Synonyms
- List: Ficus heterophylla var. assamica (Miq.) Corner ex Chater; Ficus morifolia Vahl; Ficus repens Roxb. ex Willd.; Ficus rubifolia Griff.

= Ficus assamica =

Species of flowering plant

Ficus assamica is a species of flowering plant in the genus Ficus, native to the foothills of the Himalayas, Assam, south-central China, and mainland Southeast Asia. It is a recumbent or creeping shrub reaching at most 60 cm (24 in).

Some authorities considered it a variety of Ficus heterophylla; Ficus heterophylla var. assamica. A morphological study showed that it differs from F. heterophylla by a considerable number of characters, including their growth habits, leaf shape (lobation, margins, bases and indumenta), lengths of petioles, peduncles and pedicels, the shape and color of their figs, and the number and shape of their tepals.
