= Hakaluki Haor =

Wetland ecosystem in Bangladesh

Coordinates: 24°39′N 92°04′E

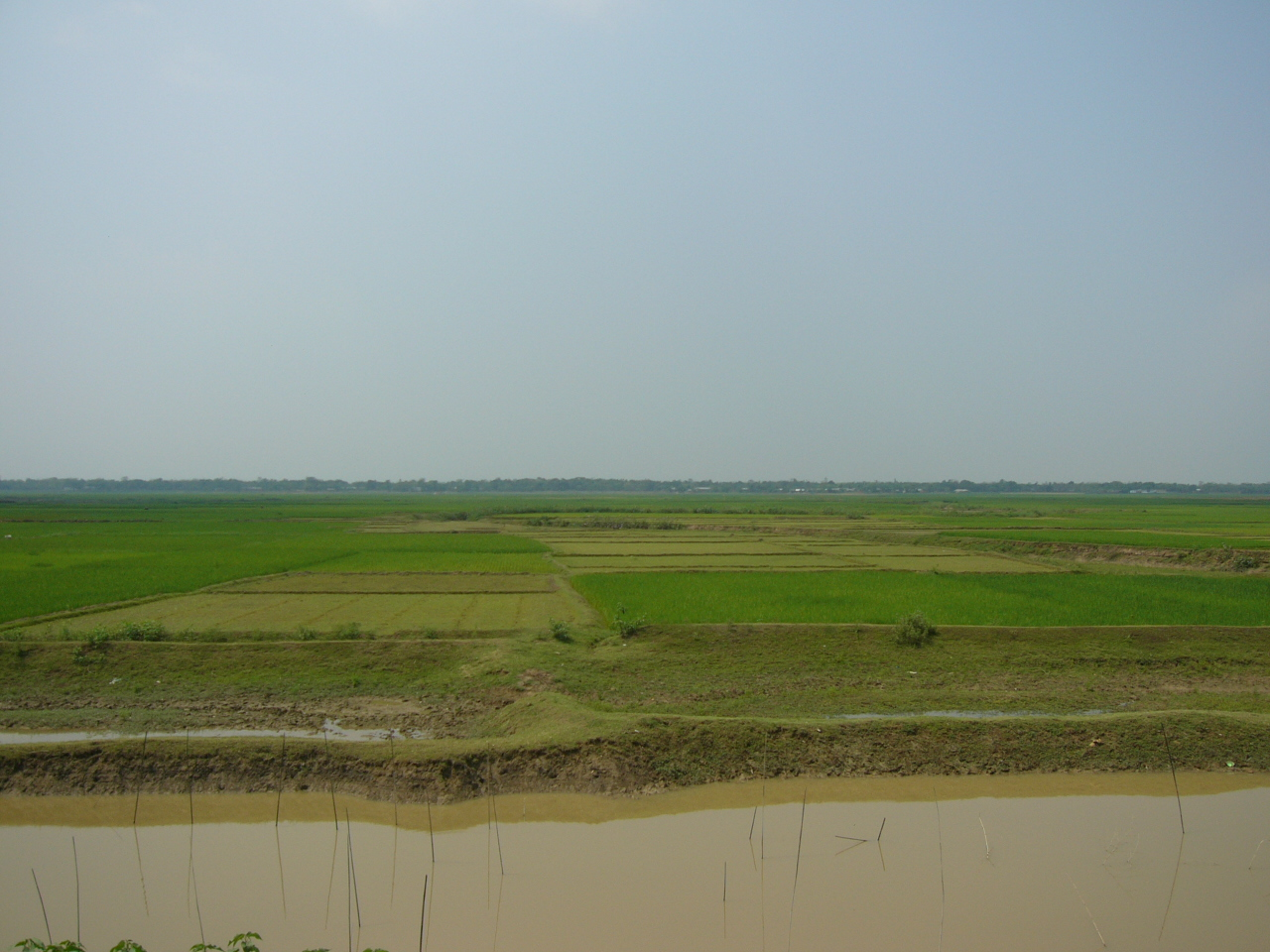
Hakaluki Haor, Sylhet

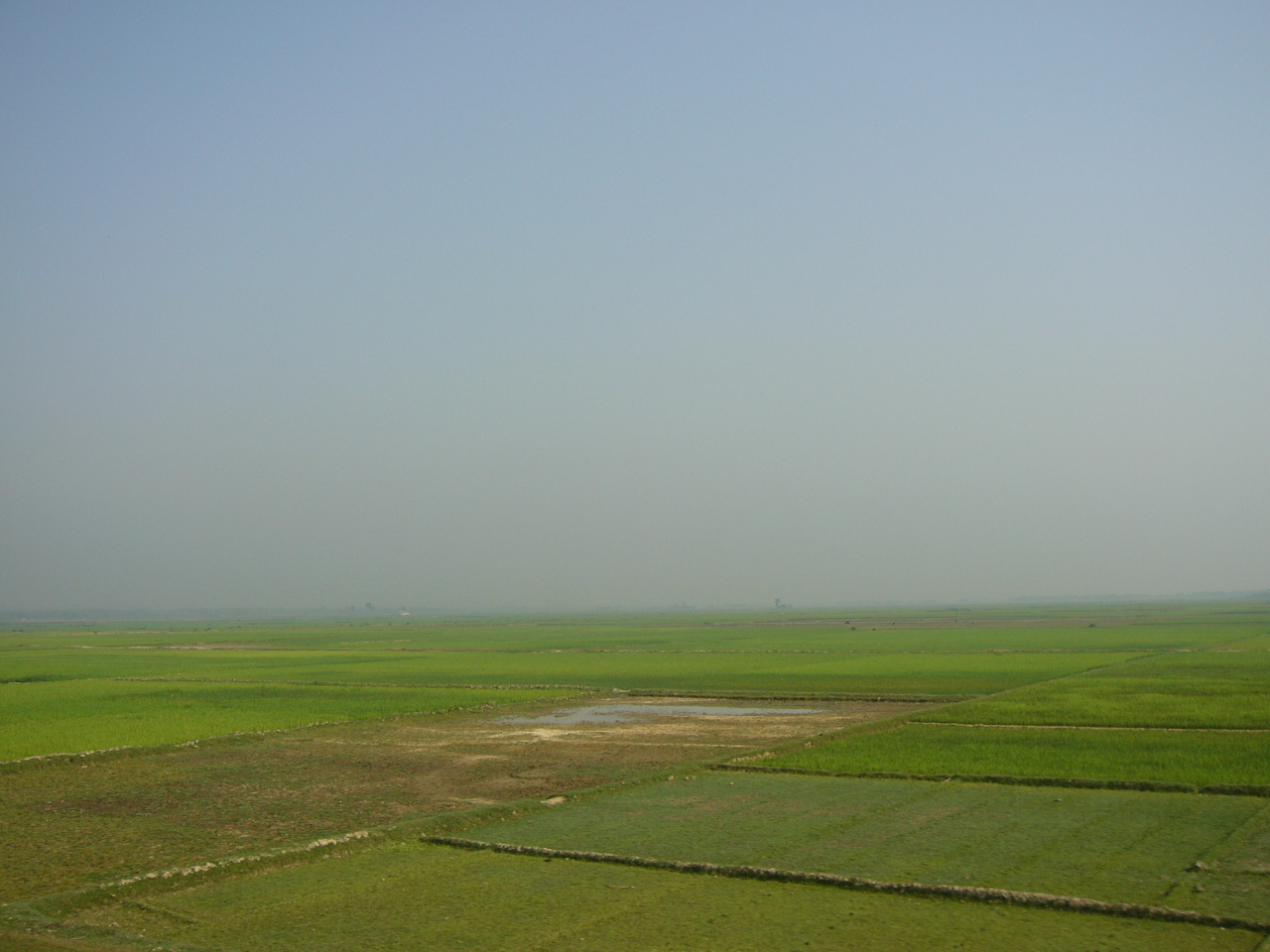
Hakaluki Haor, Sylhet

Hakaluki Haor (Bengali: হাকালুকি হাওর) is a freshwater marsh located in north-eastern Bangladesh. It is one of the largest such marshes in Asia, and likely the largest in Bangladesh. The haor is bounded in parts by the Kushiara river in the north. A notable feature to its west is the Fenchuganj-Kulaura railway, and the Kulaura-Beanibazar road runs east of it. The marsh lies between 24°35’ N to 24°44’ N and 92°00’ E to 92°08’ E.

A total of 558 species of animals and birds have been identified here, including some very rare – already declared as threatened, vulnerable, endangered and critically endangered species and animals. Some 190,000 people live in the surrounding Hakaluki haor area. Hakaluki Haor is designated an Ecologically Critical Area (ECA).

The surface area of Hakaluki Haor is 181.15 km^{2}, of which 72.46 km^{2} (40.01%) is within the territory of Barlekha Upazila. It is also under Kulaura and Juri upazila of Moulvibazar District and Golapganj, Fenchuganj upazila of Sylhet district.

== See also ==
- Haor
- Fenchuganj Upazila
