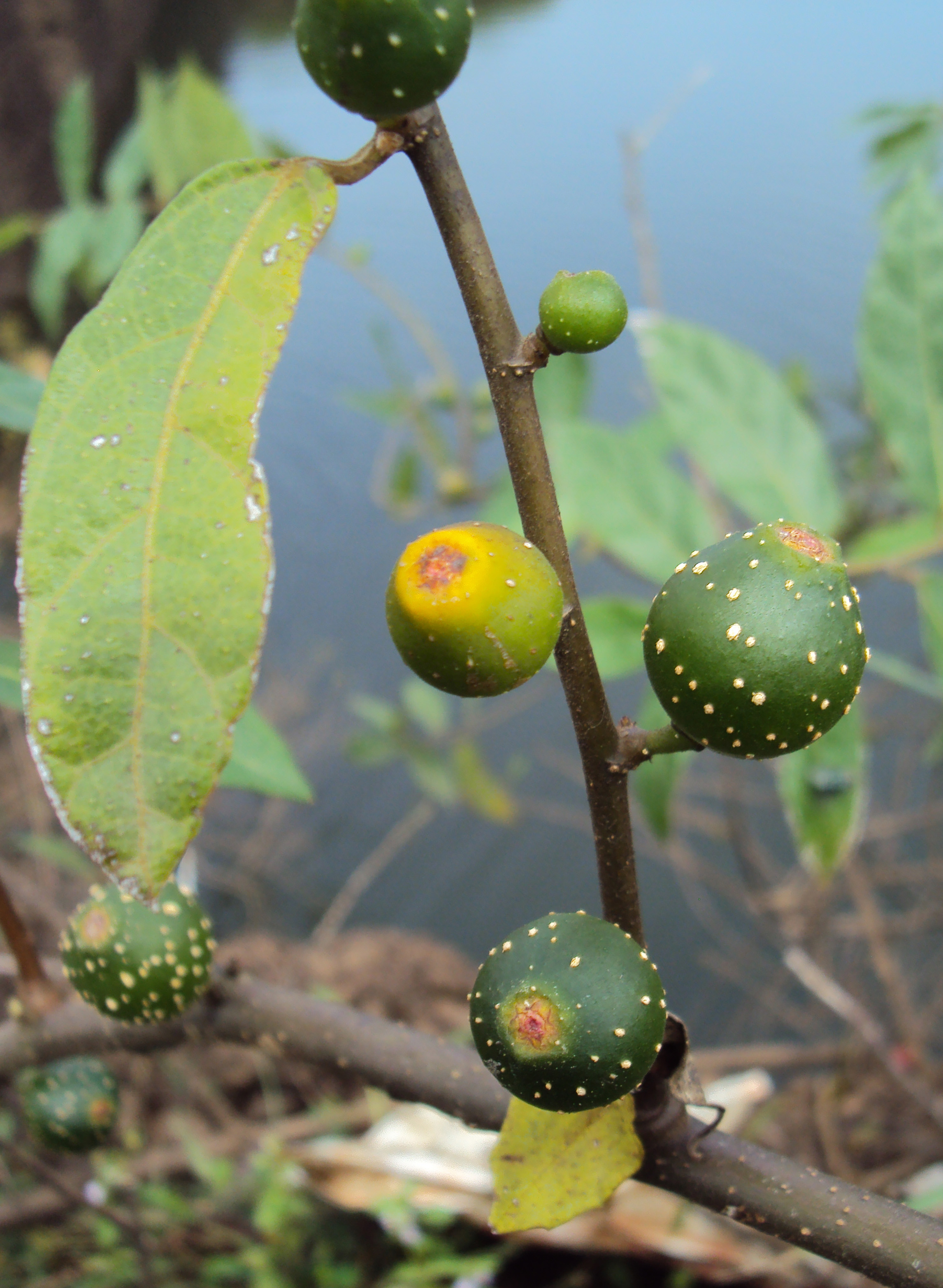

Scientific classification
- Kingdom: Plantae
- Clade: Tracheophytes
- Clade: Angiosperms
- Clade: Eudicots
- Clade: Rosids
- Order: Rosales
- Family: Moraceae
- Genus: Ficus
- Subgenus: F. subg. Sycidium
- Species: F. heterophylla

Binomial name
- Ficus heterophylla L. f.

Synonyms
- List: Urostigma subpanduriforme Miq. Ficus truncata Vahl Ficus subpanduriformis Miq. Ficus scabrella Roxb. Ficus rufescens Vahl Ficus heterophylla var. scabrella (Roxb.) King Ficus heterophylla var. elongata (Miq.) Miq. Ficus grossularioides var. subpanduriformis (Miq.) Kuntze Ficus elongata Miq. Ficus denticulata Vahl Ficus cannabina Lour. Ficus biglandula Bl. Ficus aquatica Koen. ex Willd. Ficus acutiloba Miq.

= Ficus heterophylla =

Species of Asian fig

Ficus heterophylla is a fig plant species, in the family Moraceae, which can be found in India, southern China, Indo-China and western Malesia. In Vietnam it may be called vú bò.

== Synonyms ==
No subspecies are listed in the Catalogue of Life. Various previously described varieties have either been subsumed or re-assigned to other species:

- F. heterophylla var. assamica (Miq.) Corner ex Chater is a synonym of Ficus repens Roxb. ex Sm.
- F. heterophylla var. mindanaensis (Warb.) Corner (and F. mindanaensis Warb.) are synonyms of Ficus grewiifolia Blume.

== Gallery ==
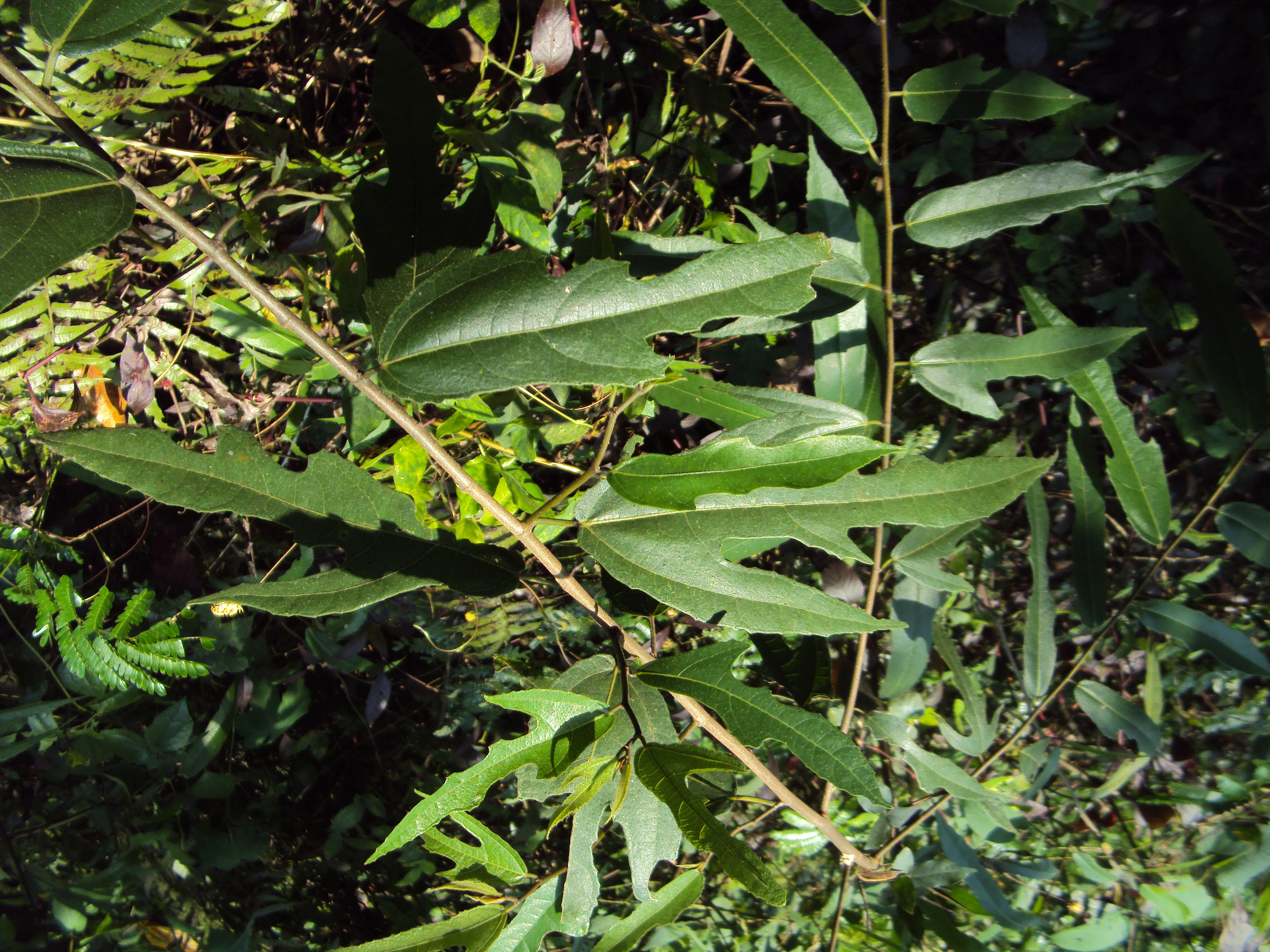

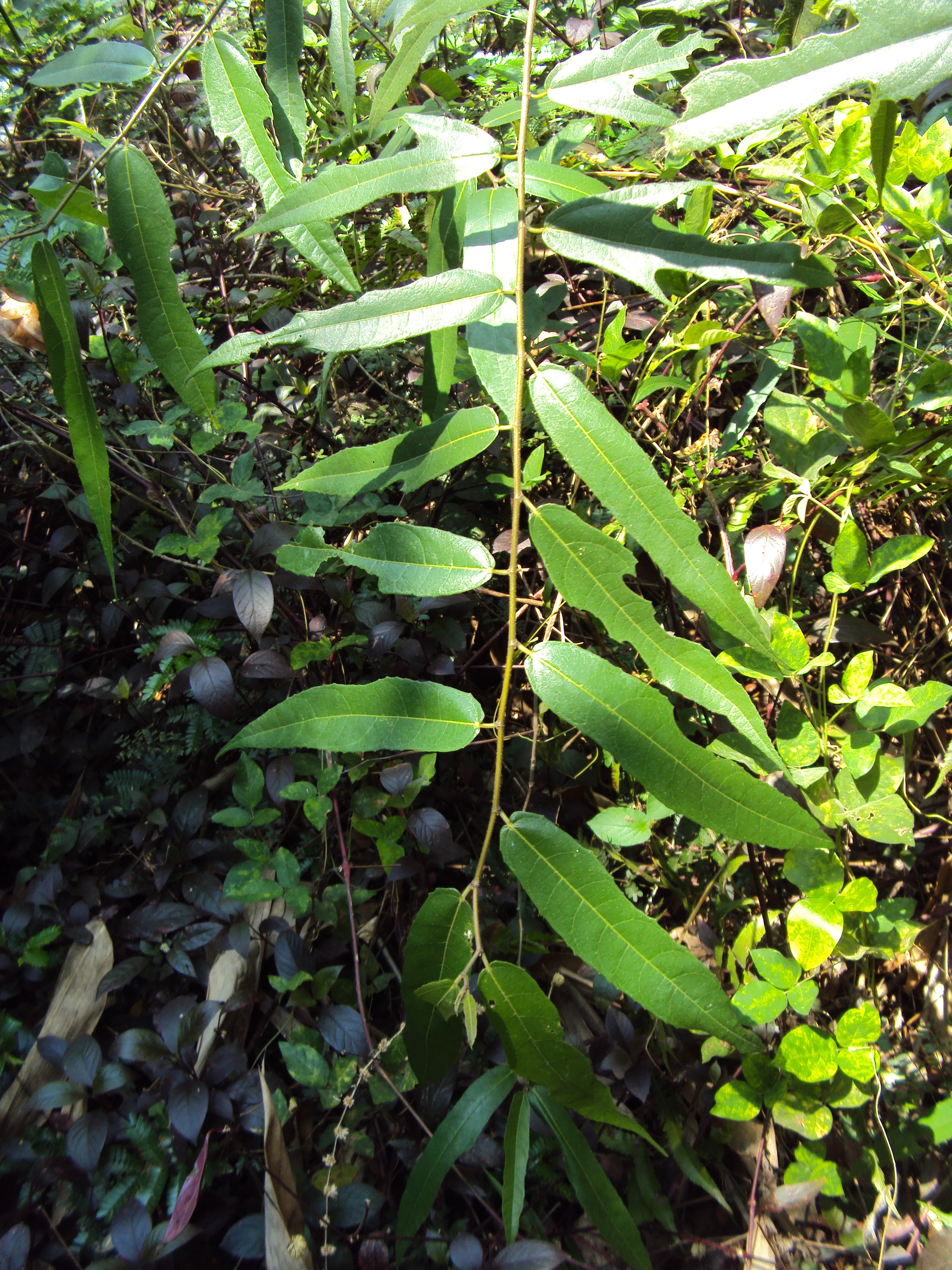

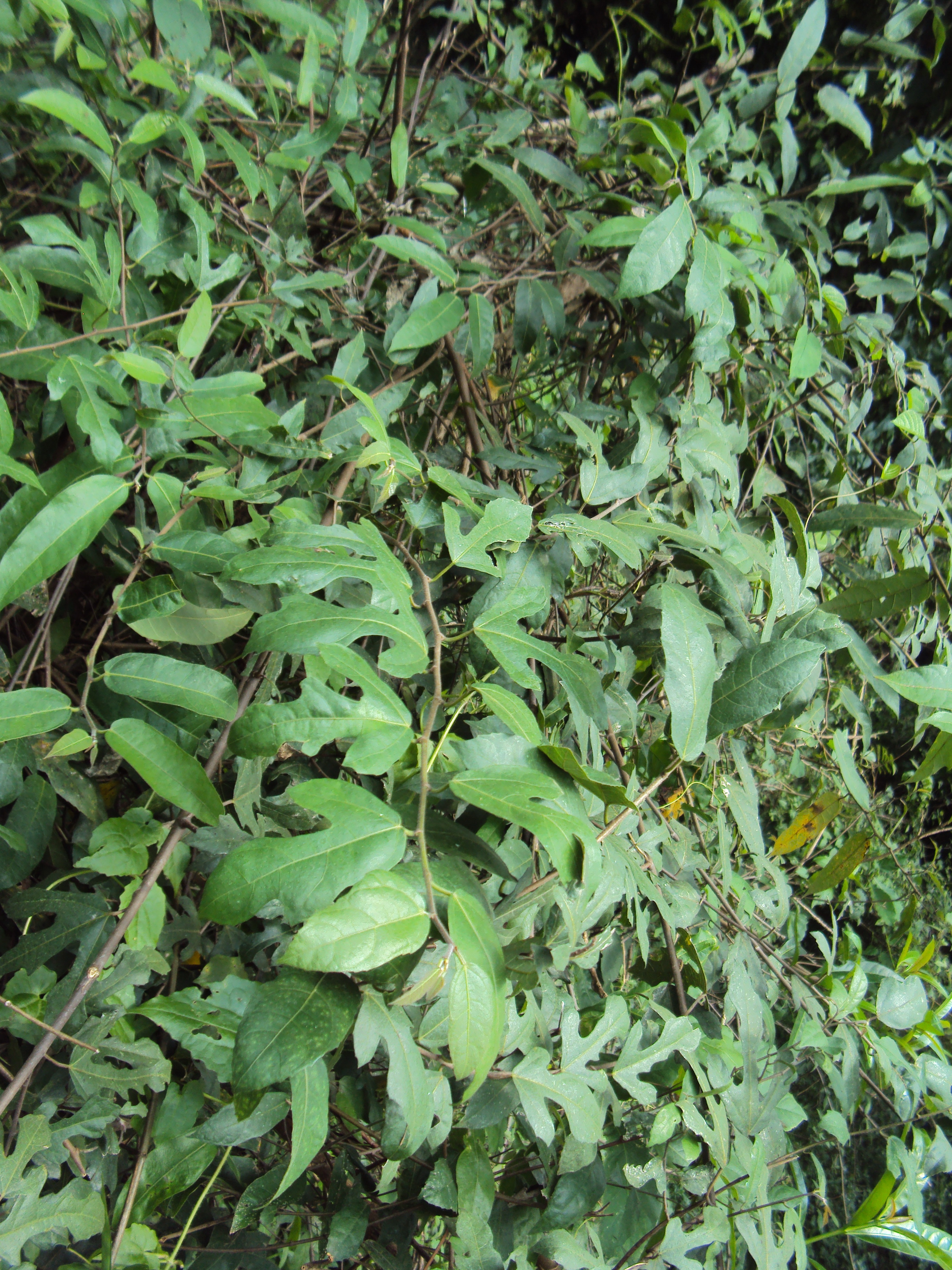
