= Dakshin Surma Upazila =

Coordinates: 24°49′10″N 91°52′35″E

Dakshin Surma দক্ষিণ সুরমা
- Upazila
- Jamia Tawakkulia Renga Madrasah, South Surma

- Country: Bangladesh
- Division: Sylhet
- District: Sylhet

Government
  - MP (Sylhet-3): Vacant
  - Upazila Chairman: Muhammad Abu Jahid

Area
  - Upazila: 187.66 km^{2} (72.46 sq mi)

Population (2022)
  - Upazila: 304,303
  - Density: 1,621.6/km^{2} (4,199.8/sq mi)
  - Metro: 41,454
- Demonym: South Surman
- Time zone: UTC+6 (BST)
- Postal code: 3107
- Area code: 0821
- Website: dakshinsurma.sylhet.gov.bd

Dakshin Surma Upazila mauza geocode map

Dakshin Surma (Bengali: দক্ষিণ সুরমা, romanized: Dokkhin Shurma), also known as South Surma, is an upazila of Sylhet District in Sylhet Division, Bangladesh.

== History ==
After the Conquest of Gour in 1303, many disciples of Shah Jalal settled in the Jalalpur, Godhrail and Renga parganas in modern-day South Surma where they would preach Islam to the locals. Shah Mir Afzal Khandakar migrated to the village of Mirargaon (Jalalpur), Shah Kamal Pahlawan Yemeni, Shah Moinuddin and Shah Jawharuddin to Maqamduar, Sheikh Jalal Shah Milon, Shah Muhammad Taqiuddin and Shah Sheikh Fathuddin to Jalalpur, Sheikh Farid Ansari and Sheikh Shah Sikandar to Lalabazar, Makhdum Zafar Sheikh Ghaznawi to Muhammadpur (Godhrail), Khwaja Taif Salim to Silam (Godhrail), Shah Sheikh Rahimuddin Ansari to Purbobhag (Jalalpur), Syed Qutbuddin Sheikh and Syed Jalaluddin Sheikh to Bungigram (Godhrail), Sayyid Zakir Shah Fatimi Makki to Turukkhola (Renga) and Shah Sheikh Daud Qureshi to Daudpur (Renga).

== Demographics ==
Religions in Dakshin Surma Upazila (2022)
Religion	Percent
Islam	95.57%
Hinduism	4.42%
Other or not stated	0.01%

According to the 2022 Bangladeshi census, Dakkhin Surma Upazila had 51,193 households and a population of 262,787. 8.70% of the population were under 5 years of age. Dakkhin Surma had a literacy rate (age 7 and over) of 79.89%: 81.88% for males and 78.01% for females, and a sex ratio of 96.08 males for every 100 females. 15,366 (5.85%) lived in urban areas.

According to the 2011 Bangladesh census, Dakshin Surma Upazila had 43,004 households and a population of 253,388. 60,786 (23.99%) were under 10 years of age. Dakshin Surma had a literacy rate (age 7 and over) of 56.01%, compared to the national average of 51.8%, and a sex ratio of 1006 females per 1000 males. 17,064 (6.73%) lived in urban areas.

== Administration ==
The following are the nine unions in South Surma based on the Bangladesh Population Census of 2011 by the Bangladesh Bureau of Statistics.

Union
Name of union and GO code	Area (km2)	Population		Literacy rate (%)
Name of union and GO code	Area (km2)	Male	Female	Literacy rate (%)
Kuchai 45	16.27	7,311	6,588	60.33
Jalalpur 37	31.98	13,735	13,368	52.31
Tentli 85	9.48	10,253	9,894	59.94
Daudpur 30	27.18	11,762	10,649	56.02
Baraikandi 36	9.87	7,894	7,103	64.02
Mogla Bazar 60	37.91	12,835	12,170	56.10
Mollargaon 65	9.56	10,494	9,892	62.81
Lala Bazar 50	20.10	9,982	9,714	56.99
Silam 75	25.3	12,846	12,183	59.72
Kamalbazar	6.54			

== Points of interest ==
There are many popular places to visit in Dakshin Surma. Significant one is a gem, one of the oldest mosques in Bangladesh is in Poschim Bag R/A in Kuchai Union, which is called Poschim Bag R/A Puraton Jame Masjid, it's believed to be established back in the 16th century and the family who built the mosque and waqf it are still living just in front of the mosque. Qadipur Jame Mosque in Jalalpur, Monir Ahmad Academy, Turukkhola Islamia Balika Alim Madrasa, Hayat Mahmud Turukkhola Jame Masjid (Puran Masjid), Shah Daud (R) Jame Masjid in Daudpur, Jamia Towakkulia Renga Madrasha in Moglabazar and Chapra Beel in Tetli are notable tourist sites.

== Notable people ==
- Abdul Jalil Choudhury, Islamic scholar and member of Assam Legislative Assembly for 27 years
- Abdul Muktadir, geologist and lecturer martyred during the 1971 Dhaka University massacre
- Abdul Malik, first cardiologist of Pakistan and National Professor of Bangladesh
- Shafi Ahmed Chowdhury Al-Qureshi, businessman, politician
- Abdul Mukit Khan, politician
- Basanta Kumar Das, politician
- Dilwar Khan, poet
- Khandaker Abdul Malik, politician
- Mahbub Ali Khan, rear admiral and former Chief of Naval Staff (Bangladesh)
- E.A.Chowdhury Al-Qureshi, former Inspector General of Bangladesh Police and founding commissioner of Dhaka Metropolitan Police
- Habibur Rahman Habib, politician
