= Ashraful Alam (educationist) =

Bangladeshi educationist

Ashraful Alam PhD

Sylhet International University Vice Chancellor
- Incumbent
- Assumed office 13 Aug 2023
- Chancellor: Mohammed Shahabuddin
- Preceded by: Shahid Ullah Talukder

Personal details
- Born: April 16, 1973 (age 53) Sherpur, Bangladesh
- Education: Postdoctoral (Tsuboi Laboratory, Reken, OU), 2012; Ph.D. in Chemistry (OU), 2005; M.Sc. in Organic Chemistry (SUST), 1995; B.Sc. (Honors) in Chemistry (SUST), 1994
- Awards: Japanese Gov. Scholarship (Monobushu)

Ashraful Alam is a Bangladeshi educator and vice chancellor of Sylhet International University. His research spans organic chemistry, bio-organic chemistry, and chemical education.

== Career ==
Alam is the Vice-Chancellor of Sylhet International University since 13 August 2023. He was a professor in the chemistry department of Shahjalal University of Science and Technology.

== Journal Publications ==
- Moon, J. F.; Khan, M. M. R.; Alam, M. A.; Younus, M. Simple synthesis of poly (1,4-bis(dodecyloxy)-2,5-diethynylbenzene)/Pd composites with catalytic activity in Sonogashira coupling reaction. International Journal of Chemical Reactor Engineering, 2020. DOI
- Amina, M. K.; Rahman, M. M.; Naher, M.; Islam, T.; Ahmad, M. F.; Khan, M. A.; Khan, M. M. R.; Alam, M. A.; Younus, M.; Biswas, M. K.; Haque, Y. Acceptor and donor substituted alkoxy (phenyleneethynylenes) (Alkoxy-PEs): Synthesis, thermal, linear and nonlinear optical properties. Synthetic Metals, 232, 96–102 (2017).
- Alam, A.; Tsuboi, S. Total Synthesis of 3,3′,4-tri-O-methylellagic acid from gallic acid. Tetrahedron, 63, 10454–10465 (2007).
- Alam, A.; Takaguchi, Y.; Ito, H.; Yoshida, T.; Tsuboi, S. Multi-functionalization of gallic acid towards improved synthesis of α- and β-DDB. Tetrahedron, 61, 1909–1918 (2005).
- Alam, A. 1,3-di-bromo-5,5-dimethylhydantoin. Synlett, 2403 (2005).
- Alam, A.; Takaguchi, Y.; Tsuboi, S. A simple, extremely fast and high yielding oxidation of thiols to disulfides. Synthetic Communications, 35, 1329–1333 (2005).
- Alam, A.; Takaguchi, Y.; Tsuboi, S. 1,3-Dibromo-5,5-dimethylhydantoin, a useful reagent for ortho-monobromination of phenols and polyphenols. Journal of the Faculty of Environmental Science and Technology, Okayama University, 10, 105–109 (2005).
- Alam, A.; Takaguchi, Y.; Tsuboi, S. Synthesis of ellagic acid and its 4,4′-di-O-alkyl derivatives from gallic acid. Journal of the Faculty of Environmental Science and Technology, Okayama University, 10, 111–117 (2005).
- Alam, A.; Mamedov, V. A.; Gubaidulin, A. T.; Kalita, D.; Tsuboi, S. Isolation and identification of 2,3,7-tri-O-methylellagic acid from Cassia alata leaves. Natural Medicines, 57, 73 (2003).
- Dass, M. K.; Sadi, B. B. M.; Alam, M. A.; Abedin, M. Z. A study on some water quality parameters of the effluents of Chatak Paper and Pulp Industry. SUST Studies, 3(1), 75–82 (2000).
- Alam, A. M.; Muslim, T.; Rahman, M. S. M.; Abedin, M. Z. Comparative study of total Vitamin C in various fruits and vegetables in greater Sylhet area. Journal of the Bangladesh Chemical Society, 11 (1–2), 15–21 (1998).
