= Abdul Aziz (academic) =

Professor Abdul Aziz

Vice-Chancellor

Metropolitan University, Sylhet
- In office 2010–2014
- Succeeded by: Md Saleh Uddin

Personal details
- Born: Bangladesh
- Education: University of Dhaka; University of Leicester, United Kingdom; University of London
- Occupation: Professor, university administrator

Abdul Aziz is a Bangladeshi Language Movement activist and university administrator. He served in various academic and administrative positions at Shahjalal University of Science and Technology and at Metropolitan University, Sylhet since its establishment. He was later appointed Vice-Chancellor of Metropolitan University. After completing his tenure as Vice-Chancellor, he was appointed emeritus professor of the university.

== Education ==
Aziz obtained his bachelor's degree in economics from the University of Dhaka in 1957 and his master's degree in 1958. He earned an MA in Development Economics from the University of Leicester in the United Kingdom in 1966. He also received advanced training in Educational Planning and Administration from the Institute of Education, University of London.

== Career ==
Abdul Aziz has been engaged in the teaching profession since 1959. During his career, he taught at several colleges and served as Principal of Noakhali Government College, Narsingdi Government College, and Murari Chand College in Sylhet. He also served as Chairman of the Board of Intermediate and Secondary Education, Rajshahi and the Board of Intermediate and Secondary Education, Cumilla.

At Shahjalal University of Science and Technology, he served as Registrar from 1993 to 1996, as a part-time professor from 1998 to 1999, and as Treasurer from 1999 to 2003. During this period, he also served for a time as Acting Vice-Chancellor.

Following the establishment of Metropolitan University, Sylhet in 2003, he served as Professor of Economics, Dean, Treasurer, and Acting Vice-Chancellor. He was later appointed Vice-Chancellor of the university and served from 2010 to 2014. During his tenure, the first convocation of Metropolitan University was held on 22 April 2010. After completing his tenure as Vice-Chancellor, he was appointed emeritus professor of the university. He also served as President of the Kendriya Muslim Sahitya Sangsad, the oldest literary organisation in Sylhet, from 2015 to 2016.

== Research and publications ==
Abdul Aziz is the author of eight textbooks on economics, fourteen books on various subjects, and numerous research articles. He also served as a member of the editorial board of two books on the history and heritage of Sylhet published by the Bangladesh History Association.
