= Md Saleh Uddin =

Saleh Uddin

Vice-Chancellor

Shahjalal University of Science and Technology
- In office 26 February 2009 – 25 February 2013
- Preceded by: Aminul Islam
- Succeeded by: Md Aminul Haque Bhuyan

Vice-Chancellor

Metropolitan University, Sylhet
- In office 15 January 2014 – 14 January 2022
- Preceded by: Abdul Aziz
- Succeeded by: Mohammad Jahirul Hoque

Personal details
- Born: 30 June 1952 (age 74) Habiganj District, Bangladesh
- Education: University of Chittagong; Thammasat University, Thailand; University of Malaya, Malaysia
- Occupation: Professor, university administrator

Md Saleh Uddin (born June 30, 1952) is a retired professor from the Department of Economics at University of Chittagong and former vice-chancellor of Shahjalal University of Science and Technology. He has served as the vice-chancellor of Metropolitan University, Sylhet.

== Early life ==
Saleh Uddin was born on 30 June 1952, in the historic village of Moshajan Dighi, Laskarpur Union, Habiganj District, Bangladesh. He obtained his bachelor's and master's degrees from the Department of Economics at University of Chittagong. He later earned another master's degree from Thammasat University, and a PhD from the University of Malaya.

== Career ==
During the Bangladesh Liberation War, Saleh Uddin was tortured by Salahuddin Quader Chowdhury. He testified against Salahuddin Quader Chowdhury at his trial at the International Crimes Tribunal-1.

Saleh Uddin had a long teaching career at the Department of Economics at University of Chittagong. He was the head of the department of economics at United International University. In February 2009, he was appointed the vice-chancellor of Shahjalal University of Science and Technology, replacing Dr M Aminul Islam, who had been fired. He served as the vice-chancellor of Shahjalal University of Science and Technology till 2013.

Saleh Uddin became the vice-chancellor of Metropolitan University, Sylhet, serving two consecutive terms from 2014 to 2022.
