= A. M. Sarwaruddin Chowdhury =

A. M. Sarowaruddin Chowdhury

Vice-Chancellor Shahjalal University of Science and Technology
- Incumbent
- Assumed office 22 September 2024
- Preceded by: Farid Uddin Ahmed

Personal details
- Born: Patiya Upazila, Chittagong District
- Education: Hokkaido University
- Occupation: Professor, university administrator

A. M. Sarowaruddin Chowdhury is a Bangladeshi academic. He is a professor in the Department of Applied Chemistry and chemical engineering at the University of Dhaka and currently serves as the vice-chancellor of the Shahjalal University of Science and Technology.

== Early life and education ==
Chowdhury was born in Patiya Upazila of Chittagong District. He obtained his BSc (Honours) degree in 1988 with first class first position and MSc degree in 1990 from the Department of Applied Chemistry at the University of Dhaka. He earned his PhD in 1997 from Hokkaido University in Japan.

== Career ==
Chowdhury joined the Department of Applied Chemistry at the University of Dhaka as a lecturer in 1990 (renamed as the Department of Applied Chemistry and Chemical Engineering in 2009). He was promoted to assistant professor in 1997, associate professor in 2000, and full professor in 2003. Alongside teaching, he has held various administrative positions, including member of the Academic Council and Board of Advanced Studies, departmental chairperson, acting provost, and member of the senate and syndicate of Khulna University. On 18 September 2024, he was appointed as the vice-chancellor of the Shahjalal University of Science and Technology, and he officially assumed office on 22 September.

== Research and publications ==
He has published over 200 research articles in national and international journals. In addition, he has co-authored several books.
