= Mohammad Jahirul Hoque =

Professor Dr. Mohammad Jahirul Hoque

Vice-Chancellor

Metropolitan University, Sylhet
- Incumbent
- Assumed office 2022
- Preceded by: Md Saleh Uddin

Personal details
- Born: Habiganj District, Bangladesh
- Education: Shahjalal University of Science and Technology; Leeds Beckett University, United Kingdom; University of London
- Occupation: Professor, University Administrator

Mohammad Jahirul Hoque is a Bangladeshi professor. He is a professor in the Department of Political Studies at Shahjalal University of Science and Technology (SUST) and the incumbent Vice-Chancellor of Metropolitan University, Sylhet. He became the first alumnus of SUST to be appointed as the vice-chancellor of a university.

== Early life and education ==
Mohammad Jahirul Hoque was born in Habiganj. He passed the Secondary School Certificate (SSC) examination from J. K. & H. K. High School in 1993 and the Higher Secondary Certificate (HSC) examination from Brindaban Government College in 1995. He completed his Bachelor of Social Science (Honours) degree in 1998 and Master of Social Science degree in 1999 from the Department of Political Studies and Public Affairs (now the Department of Political Studies) at Shahjalal University of Science and Technology. He later received a Commonwealth Scholarship and earned a second master's degree in Peace and Development from Leeds Metropolitan University (now Leeds Beckett University) in the United Kingdom. Subsequently, he was awarded another Commonwealth Scholarship and obtained a PhD in Development Studies from the School of Oriental and African Studies, University of London in 2018.

== Career ==
Mohammad Jahirul Hoque began his academic career in 2002 as a lecturer in the Department of Business Administration at Leading University. In 2004, he joined the Department of Political Studies and Public Administration (now the Department of Political Studies) at Shahjalal University of Science and Technology as a lecturer. He was promoted to Assistant Professor in 2006, Associate Professor in 2014, and Professor in 2018. During his tenure at SUST, he served in several administrative positions, including Assistant Provost, member of the Board of Advanced Studies, and member of the Central Admission Test Committee. He has also been actively involved in various professional organizations. He is a member of the National Council of the Bangladesh Poribesh Andolon (BAPA), a member of the Asiatic Society of Bangladesh, and the founding president of the Political Studies Alumni Association of SUST.

In 2022, Hoque was appointed Vice-Chancellor of Metropolitan University, Sylhet. Notably, he became the first alumnus of Shahjalal University of Science and Technology to be appointed as the vice-chancellor of a university in Bangladesh.

== Research and publications ==
Hoque has presented papers at various national and international seminars. In addition, he has published more than 30 research articles in national and international academic journals.
