= Begum Serajunnessa Choudhury =

Former member of Pakistan National Assembly

Begum Serajunnesa Choudhury
- সিরাজুন্নেসা চৌধুরী

Member of 3rd National Assembly
- In office 1962–1965
- Succeeded by: Syeda Razia Faiz
- Constituency: NE-78 (Women's Constituency III)

Personal details
- Born: 27 November 1910 Ita Pargana, Sylhet District, Eastern Bengal and Assam, British India
- Died: 9 December 1974 (aged 64) Sylhet, Bangladesh
- Spouse: Abdur Rasheed Choudhury (m. 1926; died 1944)
- Children: 7 including Humayun and Faruk

Begum Serajunnessa Choudhury (Bengali: বেগম সিরাজুন্নেসা চৌধুরী) was a member of the 3rd National Assembly of Pakistan as a representative of East Pakistan.

== Early life and family ==
Choudhury was born on 27 November 1910, in Rajnagar, Sylhet district, Eastern Bengal and Assam, British India. Her father, Dewan Abdul Halim Chowdhury, was an influential Bengali Muslim zamindar. She was privately educated at her home, where she studied Bengali, English and Islamic studies.

She married Abdur Rasheed Choudhury of Dargapasha, a member of the Assam Legislative Assembly and later a member of the Central Legislative Assembly in Delhi. They lived in Rashid Manzil, Sylhet and had seven children; five sons, including Humayun Rashid Choudhury and Faruk Rashid Chowdhury, and two daughters.

== Career ==
After the death of her husband in 1944, Serajunnessa Choudhury undertook the management of his zamindari property and tea gardens. She became the managing director of Rashid Enterprises Limited and Hamdard Tea Company Limited, the vice-chairman of Pakistan National Tea Association, mutawalli (guardian) of the Serajnagar and Rashidabad Waqf Tea Garden. She also served as a member of the managing committee of the Durgapasha Abdur Rashid Kindergarten.

Choudhury was a member of the 3rd National Assembly of Pakistan. In parliament, she questioned why all the service branch headquarters were located in West Pakistan.

== Death ==
She died in 1974, in Bangladesh. Begum Sirajunnesa Chowdhury Hall of Shahjalal University of Science and Technology was named after her.
