= Gulzar Ahmed (disambiguation) =

Gulzar Ahmed (born 1957) is a Pakistani jurist and Justice of the Supreme Court of Pakistan.

Gulzar Ahmed may also refer to:

- Gulzar Ahmed (Sunamganj politician) (died 2019), Bangladeshi politician
- Gulzar Uddin Ahmed (1964–2009), colonel in the Bangladesh Army and Bangladesh Rifles

== See also ==
- Gulzar Ahmed Chowdhury, Bangladesh politician
- Chaudhary Gulzar Ahmed Gujjar (born 1965), Pakistani politician
