= List of presidential trips made by Ronald Reagan (1986) =

This is a list of presidential trips made by Ronald Reagan during 1986, the sixth year of his presidency as the 40th president of the United States. International trips are highlighted in blue.

This list excludes trips made within Washington, D.C., the U.S. federal capital in which the White House, the official residence and principal workplace of the president, is located. It also excludes the capital's immediate surroundings in Maryland and Virginia, such as Andrews Air Force Base in Maryland, where the president typically boards Air Force One for all trips outside the area. Also excluded are trips to Camp David, the country residence of the president, and to Reagan's Rancho del Cielo ranch in Santa Barbara County, California.

== January ==
| State or country | Areas visited | Dates | Details |
|---|---|---|---|
| California | Palm Springs, Los Angeles, El Centro | January 1–3 | Stayed at Sunnylands and the Century Plaza Hotel. Spoke at Naval Air Facility El Centro before crossing the Mexican border. |
| Mexico | Mexicali | January 3 | Informal meeting with President Miguel de la Madrid. |
| Texas | Houston | January 31 | Spoke at the memorial service at Johnson Space Center for the crew of STS-51-L, who had died in the Space Shuttle Challenger disaster three days earlier. |

== February ==
| State or country | Areas visited | Dates | Details |
|---|---|---|---|
| Missouri | St. Louis | February 12 | Campaigned for former governor Kit Bond for Senate at the Omni International Hotel. |
| Grenada | St. George's | February 20 | Met with Governor General Paul Scoon and Prime Minister Herbert Blaize, and with the Prime Ministers of Barbados, Dominica, Jamaica, St. Lucia, St. Christopher and Nevis, St. Vincent and the Grenadines, Antigua and Barbuda, and Trinidad and Tobago. Dedicated a memorial to U.S. servicemen. |

== March ==
| State or country | Areas visited | Dates | Details |
|---|---|---|---|
| Louisiana | New Orleans | March 27 | Campaigned for Representative Henson Moore for Senate at the Hilton New Orleans Riverside. |
| California | Ballard | March 30 | Attended Easter services at Santa Ynez Valley Presbyterian Church. |

== April ==
| State or country | Areas visited | Dates | Details |
|---|---|---|---|
| Maryland | Baltimore | April 7 | Threw out the ceremonial first pitch on Opening Day of Major League Baseball at Baltimore Memorial Stadium. |
| New York | New York | April 18 | Campaigned for Senator Al D'Amato at the Waldorf Astoria New York. |
| Hawaii | Honolulu | April 26–28 | Stayed at the home of Christopher Hemmeter. Visited Randy Raquion, a 13-year-old Filipino boy suffering from leukemia, at Kapiolani Medical Center for Women and Children. |
| Guam | Yigo | April 29 | Stopover at Andersen Air Force Base on the way to Indonesia. |
| Indonesia | Bali | April 29–May 2 | Attended the ASEAN Ministerial Meeting. Met with Indonesian president Suharto and Philippine vice president Salvador Laurel. |

== May ==
| State or country | Areas visited | Dates | Details |
|---|---|---|---|
| Japan | Tokyo | May 2–7 | Attended the 12th G7 summit. |

== June ==
| State or country | Areas visited | Dates | Details |
|---|---|---|---|
| South Carolina | Port Royal | June 4 | Addressed basic training graduates at Marine Corps Recruit Depot Parris Island. |
| North Carolina | Greensboro | June 4 | Campaigned for Representative Jim Broyhill for Senate at the Greensboro Coliseum. |
| New Jersey | Glassboro | June 19 | Spoke at the graduation ceremony at Glassboro High School. |
| Nevada | Las Vegas | June 25 | Campaigned for James David Santini for Senate at the Las Vegas Hilton. |

== July ==
| State or country | Areas visited | Dates | Details |
|---|---|---|---|
| New York | Pocantico Hills, New York | July 3–5 | Participated in Liberty Weekend, celebrating the 100th anniversary of the Statue of Liberty and the completion of a major restoration project on the statue, on Independence Day. Relit the statue's torch by turning on a laser aboard the USS John F. Kennedy in New York Harbor. Spoke at a ceremony on Governors Island. Viewed the Operation Sail parade from the deck of the USS Iowa. Stayed overnight at Kykuit. |
| Alabama | Dothan | July 10 | Addressed the Dothan–Houston County Chamber of Commerce at the Dothan Civic Center. |
| Texas | Dallas | July 23 | Campaigned for Governor Bill Clements at the Dallas Apparel Mart. |
| Florida | Miami | July 23–24 | Stayed at the InterContinental Miami, where he campaigned for Senator Paula Hawkins. |
| South Carolina | Columbia | July 24 | Campaigned for Representative Carroll A. Campbell Jr. for governor and Representative Thomas F. Hartnett for lieutenant governor at the Carolina Coliseum. |

== August ==
| State or country | Areas visited | Dates | Details |
|---|---|---|---|
| Illinois | Springfield, Rosemont | August 12 | Attended the Illinois State Fair. Campaigned for Governor Jim Thompson at the Rosemont-O'Hare Exposition Center. |
| California | Los Angeles, Santa Barbara | August 26–29 | Stayed at the Century Plaza Hotel. Attended dinner parties at the homes of Betsy Bloomingdale and Thomas V. Jones, and at Barney Klinger's Hope Ranch in Santa Barbara. |

== September ==
| State or country | Areas visited | Dates | Details |
|---|---|---|---|
| California | Los Angeles | September 7–8 | Campaigned for Representative Ed Zschau for Senate at the Century Plaza Hotel. |
| Colorado | Denver | September 8 | Campaigned for Representative Ken Kramer for Senate at the Radisson Hotel. |
| Louisiana | Metairie, New Orleans | September 18 | Campaigned for Representative Henson Moore for Senate at Lafreniere Park and the Sheraton New Orleans. |
| Alabama | Montgomery | September 18 | Campaigned for Senator Jeremiah Denton at the Montgomery Civic Center. |
| New York | New York | September 22 | Addressed the opening session of the 41st United Nations General Assembly. |
| Michigan | Detroit | September 24 | Campaigned for Wayne County executive William Lucas for governor at Cobo Hall. |
| Nebraska | Omaha | September 24 | Campaigned for state treasurer Kay Orr for governor at the Omaha Civic Auditorium. |
| Missouri | Kansas City | September 29 | Campaigned for Kit Bond for Senate at Kansas City Downtown Airport. |
| South Dakota | Sioux Falls | September 29 | Campaigned for Senator James Abdnor at the Sioux Falls Arena. |

== October ==
| State or country | Areas visited | Dates | Details |
|---|---|---|---|
| Georgia | Atlanta | October 1 | Attended the grand opening and dedication of the Jimmy Carter Library and Museum. |
| North Carolina | Raleigh | October 8 | Campaigned for Senator Jim Broyhill at the Raleigh Civic and Convention Center. |
| Georgia | Atlanta | October 8 | Campaigned for Senator Mack Mattingly at the Omni Coliseum. |
| Iceland | Reykjavík | October 11–12 | Participated in the Reykjavík Summit with Soviet general secretary Mikhail Gorbachev. Met with President Vigdís Finnbogadóttir. |
| Maryland | Baltimore | October 15 | Met with a group of students from Southern Regional High School of Manahawkin, New Jersey, who were visiting Fort McHenry on a field trip. Campaigned for Linda Chavez for Senate at Festival Hall. |
| North Dakota | Grand Forks | October 17 | Campaigned for Senator Mark Andrews at the Hyslop Sports Center. |
| Wisconsin | Waukesha | October 23 | Campaigned for Senator Bob Kasten at the Waukesha County Expo Center. |
| Missouri | Springfield | October 23 | Campaigned for Kit Bond for Senate at Southwest Missouri State University. |
| Oklahoma | Oklahoma City, Norman | October 23–24 | Stayed at the Sheraton Century Center in Oklahoma City. Campaigned for Senator Don Nickles at the Lloyd Noble Center. |
| Florida | Tampa | October 24 | Campaigned for Senator Paula Hawkins at the USF Sun Dome. |
| Georgia | Columbus | October 28 | Campaigned for Senator Mack Mattingly at the Municipal Auditorium. |
| Alabama | Birmingham | October 28 | Campaigned for Senator Jeremiah Denton at the Birmingham-Jefferson Civic Center. |
| North Carolina | Charlotte | October 28 | Campaigned for Senator Jim Broyhill at Charlotte Douglas International Airport. |
| Indiana | Evansville | October 29 | Campaigned for Rick McIntyre for Congress at the Roberts Municipal Stadium. |
| South Dakota | Rapid City | October 29 | Campaigned for Senator James Abdnor at Rushmore Plaza Civic Center. |
| Colorado | Colorado Springs | October 30 | Stayed at The Broadmoor. Campaigned for Representative Ken Kramer for Senate at the Broadmoor World Arena. |
| Nevada | Reno | October 30 | Campaigned for James Santini for Senate at Lawlor Events Center. |
| Washington | Spokane | October 31 | Stayed at the Sheraton Hotel. Campaigned for Senator Slade Gorton at the Spokane Coliseum. |
| Idaho | Twin Falls | October 31 | Campaigned for Senator Steve Symms at the College of Southern Idaho Expo Center. |
| California | Anaheim | October 31–November 1 | Stayed at the Century Plaza Hotel. Campaigned for Representative Ed Zschau for Senate at the Anaheim Hilton and Towers. |

== November ==
| State or country | Areas visited | Dates | Details |
|---|---|---|---|
| Nevada | Las Vegas | November 2 | Campaigned for James Santini for Senate at the Scenic Airlines hangar. |
| California | Costa Mesa | November 3 | Attended a Republican rally on the day before the 1986 United States elections at Pacific Amphitheatre. |

== December ==
| State or country | Areas visited | Dates | Details |
|---|---|---|---|
| California | Los Angeles, Palm Springs | December 27–31 | Stayed at the Century Plaza Hotel, where he presented the Presidential Citizens Medal to the designer and crew of the Rutan Voyager, which had just become the first aircraft to complete a nonstop circumnavigation of the Earth without refueling. Spent New Year's Eve at Sunnylands. |
