= Md Aminul Haque Bhuyan =

Bangladeshi academic

- মো. আমিনুল হক ভূইয়া

Vice-chancellor of Bangladesh Islami University
- Incumbent
- Assumed office 18 April 2022
- Preceded by: Quazi Akhtar Hossain (acting)

9th Vice-chancellor of Shahjalal University of Science and Technology
- In office 28 July 2013 – 27 July 2017
- Preceded by: Md Saleh Uddin
- Succeeded by: Farid Uddin Ahmed

Personal details
- Born: 19 November 1952 (age 73) Mymensingh, East Bengal, Dominion of Pakistan
- Education: Ph.D.
- Alma mater: University of Dhaka; University of Queensland
- Occupation: University academic

Md Aminul Haque Bhuyan (born 19 November 1952) is a Bangladeshi academic and the current Vice-chancellor of Bangladesh Islami University since April 2022. He was the 9th Vice-chancellor of Shahjalal University of Science and Technology and of Z.H. Sikder University of Science & Technology, Shariatpur, Bangladesh.

== Education and career ==
Bhuyan completed his master's degree and Ph.D. from the University of Dhaka. He earned the MCN (Master of Community Nutrition ) degree from the University of Queensland.

Bhuyan was a faculty member of the University of Dhaka (former Professor and director) at the Institute of Nutrition and Food Science.
