= Abdur Rasheed Choudhury =

Indian politician (born 1944)

- আব্দুর রশীদ চৌধুরী

Member of Indian Legislative Assembly
- In office 1934–1944
- President: Abdur Rahim
- Preceded by: Abdul Matin Chaudhary
- Succeeded by: Ali Asghar Khan
- Constituency: Assam (Muslim)

Personal details
- Born: Dargapasha, Sylhet, Assam Province, British India
- Died: 4 March 1944 (aged 48) Sylhet, British India
- Spouses: Razia Rashid (m. 1912; died 1918); Begum Serajunnesa (m. 1926)
- Children: 10 including Humayun and Faruk

Abdur Rasheed Choudhury (died 1944) was a Bengali politician from Sylhet.

== Early life ==
Choudhury was born to Bengali Muslim parents from Dargapasha, Sunamganj.

== Career ==
Chowdhury and Abdul Matin Chaudhury together established Minar Printing and Publishing Limited on 14 July 1932 which published the weekly newspaper Jugabheri. Before that, he worked as an Extra Assistant Commissioner in Sylhet. The editor of the newspaper was Moqbul Hussain Choudhury. Chowdhury was a tea planter and owned Sirajnagar tea garden. He also owned Hamdard Tea Company Limited and Dilkusha tea estate.

Chowdhury served in the Central Legislative Assembly of India in the 1940s as an independent politician from the Muslim block of Assam.

== Personal life ==
Abdur Rasheed Choudhury first married Razia Rashid, a senior Cambridge graduate from an institution in Calcutta. She died from tuberculosis in 1918. He had three children including Aminur Rashid Chowdhury (1915–1985) from this marriage.

Choudhury then married Begum Serajunnessa Choudhury (1910–1974) in 1926. He went on to have seven more children from this marriage. The eldest son, Humayun Rashid Choudhury (1928–2001), was a diplomat and later the speaker of the Jatiya Sangsad (parliament of Bangladesh). Another son, Faruk Rashid Chowdhury, served as the state minister of finance, and fisheries and livestock. Others were Zeba Rasheed Chowdhury, Jahanzeb Chowdhury, Mamunur Rashid Chowdhury, and Kaiser Rasheed Chowdhury.

== Death ==
Choudhury died in 1944.
