= Humayun Rashid Choudhury =

Bangladeshi diplomat and politician

Humayun Rasheed Choudhury
- হুমায়ূন রশীদ চৌধুরী

8th Speaker of the Jatiya Sangsad
- In office 14 July 1996 – 10 July 2001
- Deputy: Mohammad Abdul Hamid
- Preceded by: Sheikh Razzak Ali
- Succeeded by: Mohammad Abdul Hamid

President of the United Nations General Assembly
- In office 1986–1987
- Preceded by: Jaime de Piniés
- Succeeded by: Peter Florin

Minister of Foreign Affairs
- In office 1984–1985
- Preceded by: A R Shamsud Doha
- Succeeded by: Anisul Islam Mahmud

Member of Parliament for Sylhet-1
- In office 1996–2001
- Preceded by: Khandaker Abdul Malik
- Succeeded by: Saifur Rahman
- In office 1986–1991
- Preceded by: Syed Rafiqul Haque
- Succeeded by: Khandaker Abdul Malik

Ambassador of Bangladesh to the United States
- In office June 1982 – September 1984
- Preceded by: Tabarak Husain
- Succeeded by: Abu Zafar Obaidullah

Personal details
- Born: 11 November 1928 Sylhet, Assam Province, British India
- Died: 10 July 2001 (aged 72) Dhaka, Bangladesh
- Resting place: Shah Jalal Dargah Cemetery
- Party: Jatiya Party (1986-1991); Awami League (1996-2000)
- Parents: Abdur Rasheed Choudhury (father); Begum Serajunnessa Choudhury (mother)
- Relatives: Faruk Rashid Chowdhury (brother)
- Education: Fletcher School at Tufts University
- Awards: Independence Day Award (2018)

Humayun Rasheed Choudhury (Bengali: হুমায়ূন রশীদ চৌধুরী; 11 November 1928 – 10 July 2001) was a Bangladeshi career diplomat and speaker of the Bangladesh Parliament from 1996 to 2001. He was elected president of the 41st session of the UN General Assembly in 1986. He was also Foreign Minister of Bangladesh and Chair of the Parliamentary Standing Committee on Foreign Relations. He was awarded the Independence Day Award posthumously in 2018 by the government of Bangladesh.

== Early life and education ==
Choudhury was born on 11 November 1928 to a Bengali political family of hereditary Choudhuries in Sylhet, erstwhile British India. Their ancestral home is in Dargapasha in Sunamganj District. He was the eldest of the seven children of Abdur Rasheed Choudhury (d. 1944) and Begum Serajunnessa Choudhury (1910–1974). Abdur was a member of the Assam Legislative Assembly and later a member of the Central Legislative Assembly in Delhi. Serajunessa was elected a member of the Pakistan National Assembly.

Choudhury passed the matriculation exam from Sylhet Government Pilot High School. Later he studied at St. Edmund's College in Shillong. He graduated from Aligarh Muslim University in 1947. He then studied for the English Bar and became a member of the Inner Temple in London. He obtained a diploma in international affairs from the London Institute of World Affairs. He later graduated from The Fletcher School of Law and Diplomacy in Massachusetts, United States. He gained fluency in Bengali, English, Urdu, French, and Italian, and was conversational in Arabic, Spanish, Portuguese, German, and Indonesian.

== Career ==
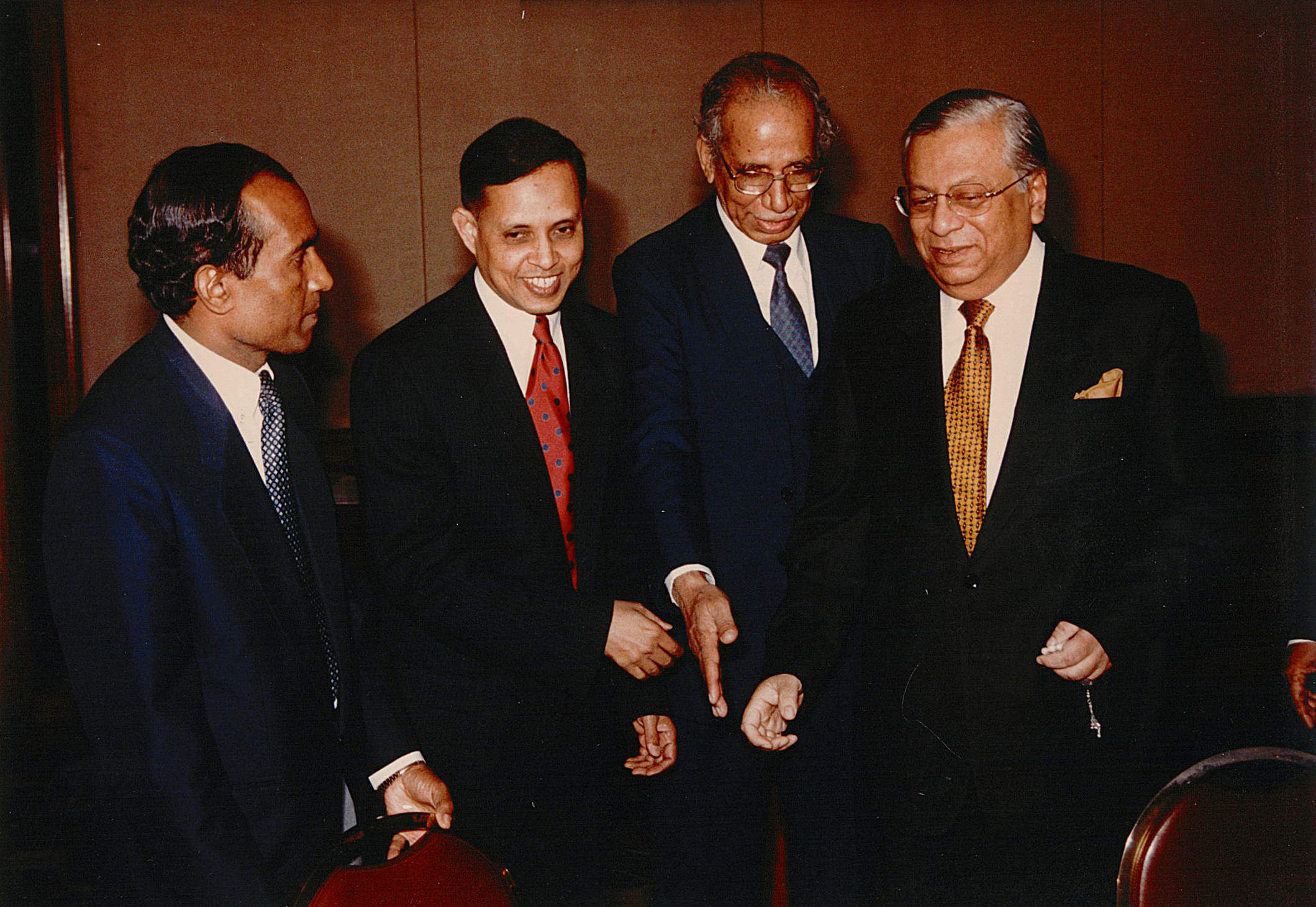
Humayun Rashid Choudhury with Kamran Hossain Chowdhury and others in 1997

Choudhury joined the Pakistan Foreign Service in 1953. During his diplomatic career with Pakistan, he held various assignments in Rome, Baghdad, Paris, Lisbon, Jakarta, and New Delhi. During the Bangladesh Liberation War in 1971, he defected to the Provisional Government of Bangladesh. He negotiated the recognition of Bangladesh by over 40 countries. On Victory Day, 1971, he addressed the Indian parliament on behalf of the Bangladeshi people. He became the first Bangladeshi ambassador to the Federal Republic of Germany in 1972, with concurrent accreditation to Switzerland, Austria, and the Holy See. He was also the first permanent representative of Bangladesh to the International Atomic Energy Agency (IAEA) and the United Nations Industrial Development Organization (UNIDO). In 1975, Choudhury sheltered Sheikh Hasina and Sheikh Rehana at his residence in Bonn after the assassination of Sheikh Mujibur Rahman.

In 1976, Choudhury became the first ambassador of Bangladesh to the Kingdom of Saudi Arabia. He also had concurrent accreditation to Jordan and Oman. During this assignment, he represented Bangladesh in the Organization of the Islamic Conference. He served as the foreign secretary of Bangladesh during 1981–1982. He was appointed ambassador to the United States in June 1982. As a member or leader of his country's delegations, he attended the United Nations General Assembly session; the Islamic Summit Conference held in Taif, Saudi Arabia (1981); the Islamic Foreign Ministers' Conference in Tripoli (1977), Dakar (1978), Fez, Morocco (1979), Islamabad (1980) and Baghdad (1981); the North-South Summit on International Cooperation and Development held in Cancun, Mexico (1981); Meetings of the Islamic Summit-level Peace Committee to resolve disputes between Iran and Iraq; the extraordinary session on Afghanistan of the Islamic Foreign Ministers in Islamabad (1980); and the extraordinary session on Jerusalem of the Islamic Foreign Ministers held in Amman (1980).

He has also led his country's delegations to a number of bilateral meetings, including talks with India on border delineation, sharing of Ganges waters, demarcation of the maritime boundary, the South Asia Forum (South Asian Regional Co-operation), Bangladesh–Burma border demarcation talks, Bangladesh-Saudi Arabia Joint Economic Talks, and others. As chairman of the fourteenth Islamic Conference of Foreign Ministers (ICFM XIV), he presided over the Co-ordination Meeting of the Foreign Ministers of the Islamic Conference while attending the thirty-ninth session of the United Nations General Assembly. He also led the Bangladesh delegation to the Extraordinary Ministerial Meeting of the Non-Aligned Countries on Namibia, held in New Delhi in April 1985, and the Islamic Peace Committee Meeting, held in Jeddah in May 1985. In the 1980s, Choudhury was the Bangladesh Ambassador to the United States, Minister of Foreign Affairs, and Chair of the Parliamentary Standing Committee on Foreign Relations. In 1986, he was elected President of the United Nations General Assembly for its 41st session. He was the first Bangladeshi and fifth person from South Asia to be elected as President of the UNGA. He was a member of the Jatiya Party led by Hussain Muhammad Ershad. He was elected to the National Parliament in 1986 and 1988. He chaired the parliament's foreign relations committee under Ershad. He was elected member of the National Parliament in 1996 as a nominee of the Bangladesh Awami League and was elected Speaker of the Parliament. He died in Dhaka due to a heart attack on July 10, 2001. He was buried in the Shah Jalal Dargah Cemetery in Sylhet.

== Awards ==
- Mahatma Gandhi Peace Prize by the College of William and Mary in Virginia (1984)
- U Thant Peace Award
- Independence Day Award (2018)

== Personal life ==
Humayun Rashid Choudhury was married to Mehjabeen Choudhury (1931–2018). They had a daughter, Nasrine R Karim (1949–2010), and a son, Nauman Rasheed Choudhury (1950–2017).
