= Sylhet International University =

Private University in Bangladesh

- Motto: Education for Innovation
- Type: Private
- Established: 2001
- Chancellor: President Mirza Fakhrul Islam Alamgir
- Vice-Chancellor: Ashraful Alam
- Location: Sylhet, 3100, Bangladesh; 24°54′5.13″N 91°50′35.2″E
- Campus: Urban
- Website: siu.edu.bd

Sylhet International University (SIU) is a private university located at Shamimabad, Bagbari, Sylhet, Bangladesh. It was established under The Private University Act of 1992. SIU is affiliated with the University Grants Commission of Bangladesh. The first vice-chancellor was Sadruddin Ahmed Chowdhury. The current vice-chancellor is. Md. Ashraful Alam The campus is equipped with facilities that include classrooms, laboratories, a library, and computer centres.

== List of vice-chancellors ==
- Sadruddin Ahmed Chowdhury
- Md. Shahid Ullah Talukder
- Md. Ashraful Alam (present)

Schools

- School of Engineering
- School of Law
- The School of Business & Social Science

== Departments ==
Department of Business Administration

- Bachelor of Business Administration(BBA)
- Masters of Business Administration(MBA)

Department of English

- Bachelor of Arts in English
- Masters of Arts(Preliminary and Final) in English
- Masters of Arts in English Literature and Language Program

Department of Law

- Bachelor of Laws (Honours)
- Masters of Law (LLM)

Department of Computer Science and Engineering

- Bachelor of Science (B.Sc.(Engg.))
- Bachelor of Science (Evening program)(B.Sc.(Engg.))

Department of Computer Science and Information Technology

- Bachelor of Science (B.Sc.(Engg.))

Department of Electronics and Communication Engineering

- Bachelor of Science(B.Sc.(Engg.))
- Bachelor of Science(Evening program)(B.Sc.(Engg.))

== Academics ==
The university commenced its first academic session in October 2001.

The university offers the following programs:

- Bachelor of Business Administration (BBA)
- Master of Business Administration (Executive and regular)
- Bachelor of Science in Computer Science & Engineering (CSE)
- Bachelor of Science in Computer Science & Engineering (Evening) (CSE)
- Bachelor of Science in Computer Science & Informatics (CSI)
- Bachelor of Science in Electronics & Communication Engineering (executive and undergraduate)
- Bachelor of Science in Electronics & Communication Engineering (Evening)
- Bachelor of Science in Electrical & Electronics Engineering (executive and undergraduate)
- Bachelor of Arts in English
- Bachelor of Laws (LL.B Hons)
- Evening programs
