= Sadruddin Ahmed Chowdhury =

Bangladeshi academic and physicist

Vice-chancellor of Shahjalal University of Science and Technology
- In office 1 June 1989 – 31 May 1993
- Preceded by: Position established
- Succeeded by: Syed Mohib Uddin Ahmed

Personal details
- Born: 1 January 1931 Phulbari, Golapganj, Sylhet District, Assam Province, British India
- Died: 23 July 2016 (aged 85) Dhaka, Bangladesh
- Education: Ph.D. (crystallography)
- Alma mater: University of Dhaka; University of Manchester
- Occupation: University academic, administrator

Sadruddin Ahmed Chowdhury (1 January 1931 – 23 July 2016) was a Bangladeshi academic and physicist. He was one of the instrumental figures in founding Shahjalal University of Science and Technology (SUST) and served as the first vice-chancellor of the university from 1989 to 1994. He also served as the vice-chancellor of Sylhet International University from 2001 to 2011.

== Education and career ==
Chowdhury passed matriculation exam from Sylhet Government Pilot High School, Sylhet. He got his bachelor's and master's in Physics from the University of Dhaka in 1951 and 1954 respectively. He obtained his Ph.D. degree in Crystallography from the University of Manchester in 1966.

Chowdhury worked as a professor of physics at Rajshahi University and Al Fateh University. Later he joined as the vice-Chancellor of SUST in 1989. His daughter Dr. Nazia Chowdhury obtained bachelor's and master's degree in Physics from SUST, PhD from University of Cambridge and currently is a professor at SUST.
