= Farid Uddin Ahmed =

Bangladeshi academic

Vice Chancellor of Shahjalal University of Science and Technology
- In office 17 August 2017 – 10 August 2024
- Preceded by: Md Aminul Haque Bhuyan
- Succeeded by: A. M. Sarwaruddin Chowdhury

Personal details
- Education: Monash University, University of Dhaka
- Occupation: University administrator, professor

Farid Uddin Ahmed is a Bangladeshi academic and a former vice-chancellor of Shahjalal University of Science and Technology.

== Education and career ==
Ahmed completed his master's degree in economics from Monash University. He served as a professor of the department of economics and the dean of faculty of social sciences at the University of Dhaka.

== Career ==
Ahmed was the former president of the Federation of Bangladesh University Teacher's Association (FBUTA).

Professor Obaidul Islam was sent on forced leave for misbehaving with Ahmed, dean of the Faculty of Social Sciences in 2014.

On 17 August 2017, Ahmed was appointed vice chancellor of Shahjalal University of Science and Technology. He previously served as the dean of the Faculty of Social Sciences at the University of Dhaka. He was reappointed on 30 June 2021.

On 16 January 2022, the Bangladesh Chhatra League, student wing of Awami League, attacked the students of Shahjalal University of Science and Technology who were protesting for the removal of Sirajunnesa Chowdhury hall provost Zafrin Ahmed Liza. On 17 January 2022, a group of students started a protest and he was locked at the IICT building for 3 long hours by students. Later he called police and police brought him out from the home by using force against protesters. Later students, started another phase of movement and demanded resignation from him. Around 30 students were critically injured in police action. The students demanded Ahmed's resignation for the police attack and 24 students went on hunger strike until death on 19 January 2022.
