= Mohammad Koysor Ahmed =

Bangladeshi politician

- মোহাম্মদ কয়সর আহমেদ

Member of the Bangladesh Parliament for Sunamganj-3
- Incumbent
- Assumed office 17 February 2026
- Preceded by: Muhammad Abdul Mannan

Personal details
- Born: 1 June 1974 (age 52)
- Party: Bangladesh Nationalist Party
- Occupation: Politician

Mohammad Koysor Ahmed (born 1 June 1974) is a Bangladesh Nationalist Party (BNP) politician. He is the incumbent Jatiya Sangsad member representing the Sunamganj-3 constituency since February 2026. He was previously the General Secretary of BNP's United Kingdom branch.
