= Faruk Rashid Chowdhury =

Bangladeshi politician

- ফারুক রশিদ চৌধুরী

Member of Parliament
- In office 7 May 1986 – 27 February 1991
- Preceded by: Humayun Rashid Choudhury
- Succeeded by: Abdus Samad Azad
- Constituency: Sunamganj-3

Personal details
- Born: 10 September 1932 (age 93) Sylhet, Assam Province, British India
- Party: Jatiya Party (1988-1996); Communist Party of Bangladesh (1987)
- Parent(s): Abdur Rasheed Choudhury (father); Serajunnessa Choudhury (mother)
- Relatives: Humayun Rashid Choudhury (brother)
- Occupation: Politician

Faruk Rashid Chowdhury is a Jatiya Party politician from Bangladesh and a former minister of finance.

== Early life and background ==
Choudhury was born into a Bengali Muslim political family in Rashid Manzil near Dargah Gate, Sylhet. His ancestral home is in Dargapasha, Sunamganj District. He was one of seven children of Abdur Rasheed Choudhury (d. 1944) and Begum Serajunnessa Choudhury (1910–1974), and a younger brother of Humayun Rashid Choudhury. Abdur Rasheed was a member of the Assam Legislative Assembly and later a member of the Central Legislative Assembly in Delhi, while Serajunessa was elected a member of Pakistan National Assembly.

== Political career ==
Chowdhury participated in a 1987 by-election as a Communist Party candidate and successfully won the Sunamganj-3 constituency seat at the 3rd Jatiya Sangsad. He did a second term in the same constituency after winning the 1988 Bangladeshi general election as a Jatiya Party candidate. Chowdhury lost his seat to Abdus Samad Azad of the Awami League at the 1991 Bangladeshi general election. He attempted to regain the seat at the June 1996 Bangladeshi general elections but lost to Azad once again.
