= Sunamganj-3 =

Constituency of Bangladesh's Jatiya Sangsad

Coordinates: 24.77°N 91.55°E

- Constituency for the Jatiya Sangsad
- District: Sunamganj District
- Division: Sylhet Division
- Electorate: 292,471 (2018)

Current constituency
- Created: 1984
- Party: Bangladesh Nationalist Party
- Member: Mohammad Koysor Ahmed
- ← 225 Sunamganj-2 227 Sunamganj-4 →

Sunamganj-3 is a constituency represented in the Jatiya Sangsad (National Parliament) of Bangladesh since 2026 by Mohammad Koysor Ahmed of the Bangladesh Nationalist Party.

== Boundaries ==
The constituency encompasses Shantiganj and Jagannathpur upazilas.

== History ==
The constituency was created in 1984 from a Sylhet constituency when the former Sylhet District was split into four districts: Sunamganj, Sylhet, Moulvibazar, and Habiganj.

== Members of Parliament ==
Election	Member	Party
1986	Faruk Rashid Chowdhury	Communist Party of Bangladesh
1991	Abdus Samad Azad	Awami League
Feb 1996	Gulzar Ahmed	Bangladesh Nationalist Party
Jun 1996	Abdus Samad Azad	Awami League
2005 by-election	Shahinur Pasha Chowdhury	Jamiat Ulema-e-Islam Bangladesh
2008	M. A. Mannan	Awami League
2026	Mohammad Koysor Ahmed	Bangladesh Nationalist Party

== Elections ==
=== Elections in the 2010s ===
General Election 2014: Sunamganj-3
Party	Candidate	Votes	%	±%
AL	M. A. Mannan	54,316	56.9	−12.9
Independent	Ajijus Samad Ajad	41,123	43.1	N/A
Majority		13,193	13.8	−26.6
Turnout		95,439	37.0	−48.2
AL hold				

=== Elections in the 2000s ===
General Election 2008: Sunamganj-3
Party	Candidate	Votes	%	±%
AL	M. A. Mannan	134,559	69.8	
IOJ	Shahinur Pasha Chowdhury	56,765	29.5	
LDP	Saydur Rahman Chowdhoury	788	0.4	
BKA	Md. Ishaq Amini	630	0.3	
Majority		77,794	40.4	
Turnout		192,742	85.2	
AL gain from IOJ				

Abdus Samad Azad died in April 2005. Islami Oikya Jote leader Shahinur Pasha Chowdhury was elected in a July 2005 by-election. He defeated Awami League candidate M. A. Mannan, Jatiya Party (Ershad) candidate Syed Ali Ahmed, independent candidate M. Nazrul Islam, and five other lower-polling contenders.

General Election 2001: Sunamganj-3
Party	Candidate	Votes	%	±%
AL	Abdus Samad Azad	69,421	45.8	+6.1
BNP	Shahinur Pasha Chowdhury	63,475	41.9	+25.7
IJOF	Abu Khaled Chowdhury	17,738	11.7	N/A
KSJL	Md. Abu Hossain	345	0.2	N/A
Jatiya Party (M)	Tahur Uddin	307	0.2	N/A
Independent	M. A. Malek Khan	142	0.1	N/A
Jatiya Janata Party (Nurul Islam)	Md. Ataur Rahman	105	0.1	−0.1
Majority		5,946	18.1	+8.4
Turnout		151,533	71.9	+3.7
AL hold				

=== Elections in the 1990s ===
General Election June 1996: Sunamganj-3
Party	Candidate	Votes	%	±%
AL	Abdus Samad Azad	42,851	39.7	−4.1
JP(E)	Faruk Rashid Chowdhury	32,328	29.9	+2.4
BNP	Dewan Joinul Jakerin	17,451	16.2	+4.3
Jamiat Ulema-e-Islam Bangladesh	Shahinur Pasha Chowdhury	8,851	8.2	−7.3
Jamaat	Syed Saleh Ahmed	3,107	2.9	N/A
IOJ	Md. Badiuzzaman	1,465	1.4	N/A
Independent	Abdul Motalib Chowdhury	1,269	1.2	N/A
Jatiya Janata Party (Nurul Islam)	Sujat Ahmed Chowdhury	243	0.2	N/A
Zaker Party	Kazi Abdul Karim	230	0.2	N/A
NAP	Abdul Hannan	212	0.2	N/A
Majority		10,523	9.7	−6.5
Turnout		108,007	68.2	+25.2
AL gain from BNP				

General Election 1991: Sunamganj-3
Party	Candidate	Votes	%	±%
AL	Abdus Samad Azad	37,701	43.8	
JP(E)	Faruk Rashid Chowdhury	23,723	27.5	
Jamiat Ulema-e-Islam Bangladesh	Syed Shamsul Islam	13,358	15.5	
BNP	Anisul Bari Chowdhury	10,285	11.9	
Jatiya Samajtantrik Dal-JSD	Dewan Eskandar Reza Chowdhury	609	0.7	
Ganatantri Party	Gulzar Ahmmed	237	0.3	
Independent	Waraidullah	208	0.2	
Majority		13,978	16.2	
Turnout		86,121	43.0	
AL gain from CPB				
