= Pagla Jame Mosque =

Mosque in South Sunamganj, Bangladesh

- পাগলা জামে মসজিদ
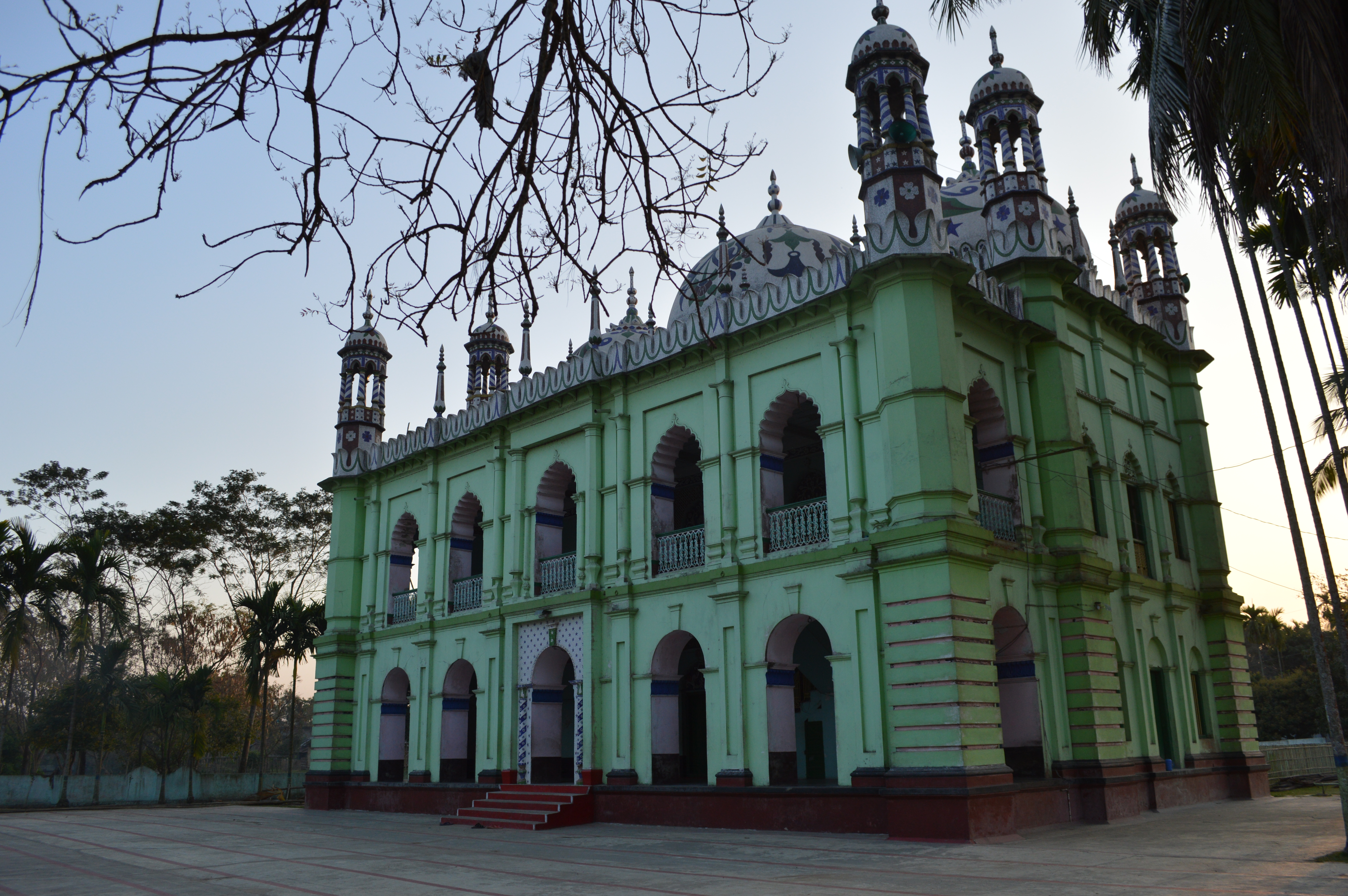

- Location in of the mosque in Bangladesh

Religion
- Affiliation: Sunni Islam
- Ecclesiastical or organisational status: Friday mosue
- Status: Active

Location
- Location: Shantiganj
- Country: Bangladesh
- Coordinates: 24.9281°N 91.4518°E

Architecture
- Architect: Mumin Astagar
- Type: Mosque architecture
- Style: Islamic
- Groundbreaking: 1924
- Completed: 1941
- Construction cost: ৳10 Crores (BDT)

Specifications
- Length: 46 m (150 ft)
- Width: 15 m (50 ft)
- Height (max): 12 m (40 ft)
- Dome: Three
- Dome height (outer): 7.6 m (25 ft)
- Minaret: Six

The Pagla Jame Mosque (Bengali: পাগলা জামে মসজিদ, lit. 'Pagla Friday Mosque'), known locally as Raypur Boro Moshjid, (Bengali: রায়পুর বড় মসজিদ; Arabic: جامع رايفور الكبير, lit. 'Great Mosque of Raypur'), is a Sunni Friday mosque, located in the village of Raypur, Paschim Pagla in the South Sunamganj upazila of Sunamganj District, Bangladesh. It lies on the banks of the Mahashing River. It was built by a local businessman called Yasin Mirza. According to The Daily Star, the mosque is one of the district's best tourist destinations.

== Overview ==
After travelling and admiring buildings around the subcontinent, in particular Calcutta, a local businessman named Yasin Mirza decided to build a mosque in his local village of Raypur. Groundbreaking took place in 1924 and construction in 1931. It took ten years to complete. Yasin Mirza hired architects and builders from cities of the British Raj such as Calcutta and Delhi. The main architect was Mumin Astagar, a descendant of one of the architects of the Taj Mahal. During this period, Mumin was living in Dacca.

In front of the two-storey mosque building is a large eidgah. There is a gate on the north side. The building has three domes.

== Gallery ==
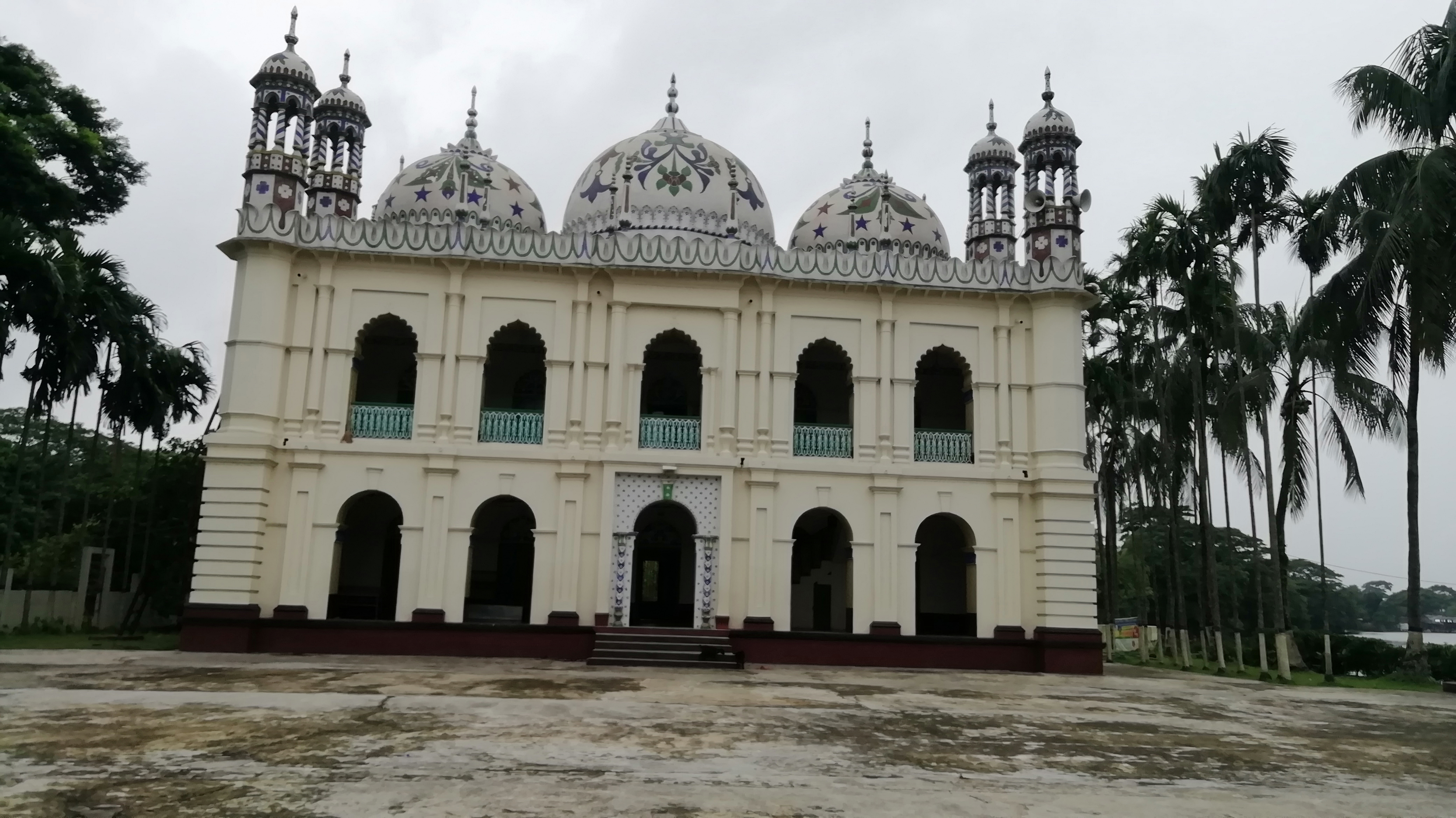
The mosque, painted in a creamy colour

== See also ==
- Islam in Bangladesh
- List of mosques in Bangladesh
