= Muhammad Abdul Mannan =

Bangladeshi Politician and Minister

M. A. Mannan
- এম. এ. মান্নান
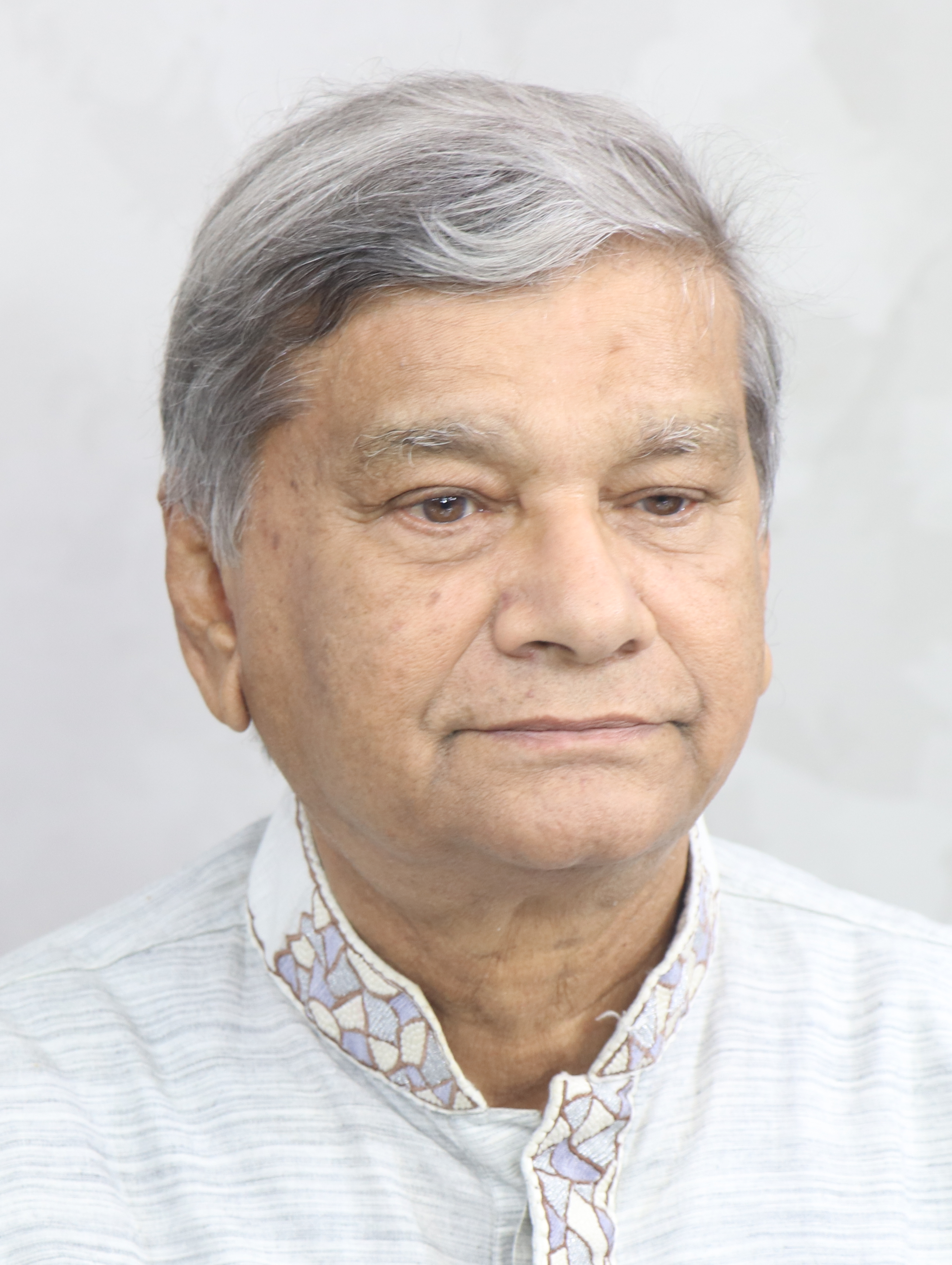
- Mannan in 2018

Minister of Planning
- In office 7 January 2019 – 10 January 2024
- President: Mohammad Abdul Hamid; Mohammed Shahabuddin
- Prime Minister: Sheikh Hasina
- Preceded by: Mustafa Kamal
- Succeeded by: Abdus Salam

Minister of State for Finance
- In office 14 January 2014 – 7 January 2019
- President: Mohammad Abdul Hamid; Mohammed Shahabuddin
- Prime Minister: Sheikh Hasina
- Minister: Abul Maal Abdul Muhith
- Preceded by: Shah M. Abul Hussain
- Succeeded by: Waseqa Ayesha Khan

Member of the Bangladesh Parliament for Sunamganj-3
- In office 25 January 2009 – 6 August 2024
- Preceded by: Shahinur Pasha Chowdhury
- Succeeded by: Mohammad Koysor Ahmed

Personal details
- Born: 16 February 1946 (age 80) Shantiganj, Assam Province, British India
- Party: Bangladesh Awami League
- Education: University of Dhaka
- Occupation: Politician

Muhammad Abdul Mannan (born 16 February 1946) is a Bangladeshi politician and a former minister of planning of Bangladesh from 2019 to 2024.

== Early life ==
Abdul Mannan was born on 16 February 1946 in Dungria, Assam Province, British India (now in Sunamganj District, Bangladesh). He finished his O-level at the PAF Public School Sargodha in Punjab, Pakistan. He graduated from the University of Dhaka.

On 2 February 1966, Abdul Mannan was the sole survivor of a helicopter crash, Pakistan International Airlines Flight 17, in which 23 other people died.

== Career ==
In 1974, he joined the government service as a BCS cadre. He served as the deputy commissioner of Kishoreganj District, Chittagong District, director general of the NGO Affairs Bureau, joint secretary (political) in the Ministry of Home Affairs, director general in the Prime Minister's office, chairman of Bangladesh Small and Cottage Industries Corporation, and the economic minister at the Bangladesh Permanent Mission in Geneva.

In 2005, he joined the Bangladesh Awami League. He was elected to the 9th parliament in 2008 from Sunamganj-3. He was the chairman of the Parliamentary Standing Committee of Public Accounts. He was a member of the Parliamentary Standing Committee on the Ministry of Finance, Parliamentary Standing Committee on the Ministry of Defense, and the Parliamentary Standing Committee on the Ministry of Public Administration. In 2010, he was elected to the central executive committee of the Bangladesh Awami League and was re-elected in 2013. He was made the state minister of finance on 12 January 2014. He was also made the state minister of planning in April 2014.

== Controversy ==
Abdul Mannan was detained after the fall of the Sheikh Hasina-led Awami League government in August 2024.
