= Metropolitan University, Sylhet =

Education organization in Sylhet, Bangladesh

Metropolitan University
- Motto: Committed to excellence
- Type: Private
- Established: 3 May 2003; 23 years ago
- Accreditation: University Grants Commission (UGC)
- Academic affiliations: Association of Commonwealth Universities; Institution of Engineers, Bangladesh
- Chairman: Toufique Rahman Chowdhury
- Chancellor: President Mirza Fakhrul Islam Alamgir
- Vice-Chancellor: Mohammad Jahirul Hoque
- Faculty: 136
- Administrative staff: 74
- Undergraduates: 48000
- Postgraduates: 421
- Location: Sylhet; 24.930182°N 91.973063°E
- Campus: Bateshwar, Sylhet, Bangladesh
- Colors: Blue, red & gray
- Website: metrouni.edu.bd

Metropolitan University (Bengali: মেট্রোপলিটন ইউনিভার্সিটি) or MU is a private university in Sylhet and was established in 2003 by a social worker, Toufique Rahman Chowdhury, with the approval of the Ministry of Education under the Private University Act, 1992 (amended in 1998).

== Achievements ==
Metropolitan University has been approved and accredited by the Government of the People's Republic of Bangladesh and University Grants Commission (UGC) of Bangladesh.

Besides, Metropolitan University is an Institutional Member of the Association of Management Development Institution in South Asia (AMDISA) and the Member of Association of Management Development Institution in Bangladesh.

The Chairman of Accreditation Service of International College (ASIC), Moris Dimok, inspected Metropolitan University on 6 October 2014 and expressed satisfaction by observing the atmosphere of university. On 19 December 2009, Ataul Karim, Vice President (Research), Old Dominion University, US paid a visit to Metropolitan University. Muhammed Zafar Iqbal, Head of the Department of Computer Science & Technology of Shahjalal University of Science and Technology (SUST), Sylhet also visited the Project Fair of Metropolitan University.

The university has four schools and eight departments. These are: 1. Department of Business Administration 2. Department of Law and Justice 3. Department of Computer Science and Engineering 4. Department of Electrical Electronics Engineering 5. Department of Software Engineering 6. Department of English 7. Department of Economics 8. Department of Data Science (proposed)

== Controversy ==
In August 2025, Metropolitan University in Sylhet sparked significant civil society backlash and public outrage after permanently expelling Sahara Chowdhury, a final-year transgender student and activist, over alleged safety concerns that rights groups condemned as discriminatory and influenced by mob pressure. University Proctor Sheikh Ashraful Rahman stated in an interview that Chowdhury's gender transition and behaviour, despite prior warnings, created a non-compliant environment, claiming that "society and laws do not allow" such practices.

== List of vice-chancellors ==
- Md Saleh Uddin (former)
- Mohammad Jahirul Hoque (present)

== School of Science & Technology ==
There are three engineering departments. Both departments are currently offering B.Sc.(Engg.) degree. The dean is Md. Nazrul Haque.

=== Departments ===
- Department of Computer Science & Engineering (CSE)
- Department of Software Engineering (SE)
- Department of Electrical & Electronics Engineering (EEE)
- Department of Data Science (DS)

== School of Business & Economics ==
This is the business school of the university. Currently two departments are running under the school. The dean is Professor Dr. Mohammad Jamal Uddin.

=== Departments ===
- Department of Business Administration
- Department of Economics

== School of Humanities & Social Sciences ==
The dean is Professor Dr. Suresh Ranjan Basak.

=== Departments ===
- Department of English

== School of Law & Justice ==
The dean is M. Rabiul Hossain.

=== Departments ===
- Department of Law and Justice

== Courses ==
=== Undergraduate course ===
University offers the following undergraduate programmes:

- B.Sc. (Engg.) in Computer Science & Engineering.
- B.Sc. (Engg.) in Electrical & Electronics Engineering.
- B.Sc. (Engg.) in Software Engineering
- B.Sc. (Engg.) in Data Science
- BSS. (Hons) in Economics
- B.A. (Hons) in English
- Bachelor of Business Administration
- LLB (Hons)

=== Graduate course ===
The following degree programmes are available for graduate students:

- M.Sc. in Management Information System
- M.A. in English
- Master of Business Administration
- Executive Master of Business Administration
- LLM

=== Short course ===
Metropolitan University offers two short course. These are:

- Android Application Development
- Micro-controller Programming

== Academic calendar ==
MU runs three semesters in an academic year. These are as follows:

Semester	Duration
Spring	January - April
Summer	May - August
Autumn	September - December

== Convocation ==
Convocation	Year
1st Convocation	2010
2nd Convocation	2015
3rd Convocation	2018

== Institutes ==
- Institute of Business & Information Technology (IBIT)

== Research and publication ==
Almost all the departments of the university are active in research oriented works and projects. Both the teachers and students frequently published various kind of research article in various international journals and conferences. The university also published a journal called Metropolitan University Journal in every two year. Metropolitan University has its own online news portal MUnews24

== Affiliation & collaboration ==
Metropolitan University is a member of and has active collaboration with the following institution/ organization:

- Ministry of Education, Bangladesh
- University Grant Commission
- Association of Commonwealth Universities
- Accreditation Service for International Colleges
- Birmingham City University
- British Council
- Association of Management Development Institutions in South Asia|Association of Management Development Institutions in South Asia (AMDISA)
- Association of Management Development Institutions in Bangladesh|Association of Management Development Institutions in Bangladesh (AMDIB)

== Notable students ==
- Sahara Chowdhury

== Scholarships ==
Metropolitan University offers various scholarship schemes to financially support the meritorious students. A student may avail the scholarship by his/her previous performance or current performance.

Metropolitan University offers the following scholarships to the meritorious students:

- University Gold Medal
- University Merit Scholarship
- Chairman's Scholarship
- Vice Chancellor's Scholarship
