= Synthetic Metals =

- Discipline: Materials science
- Language: English
- Edited by: Ifor D.W. Samuel

Publication details
- History: 1979–present
- Publisher: Elsevier
- Frequency: 24/year
- Impact factor: 3.266 (2020)

Standard abbreviations
- ISO 4: Synth. Met.

Indexing
- CODEN: SYMEDZ
- ISSN: 0379-6779
- LCCN: 80648575
- OCLC no.: 5540596

Links
- Journal homepage; Online access

Synthetic Metals is a peer-reviewed scientific journal covering electronic polymers and electronic molecular materials.

== Abstracting and indexing ==
Synthetic Metals is abstracted and indexed in the following services:

- Cambridge Scientific Abstracts
- Chemical Abstracts
- Current Contents
- Engineering Index
- FIZ Karlsruhe
- INSPEC
- Metals Abstracts
- PASCAL
- Science Citation Index
- Scopus
- VINITI

According to the Journal Citation Reports, the journal has a 2020 impact factor of 3.266. It has published several highly cited papers (1 with ~1000 citations; 5 with >600 citations; 30 with >200 citations, according to Web of Science); most of them are devoted to conductive polymers (especially polyaniline) and one to optical properties of carbon nanotubes (see Kataura plot).
