= Forty-first session of the United Nations General Assembly =

- 16 September 1986 – 15 September 1987 41st session 41st general debate
- President of the 41st General Assembly, Humayun Rashid Choudhury
- Host country: United Nations
- Participants: United Nations Member States
- President: Humayun Rashid Choudhury
- Secretary-General: Javier Pérez de Cuéllar

The forty-first session of the United Nations General Assembly opened on 16 September 1986 at the UN Headquarters in New York. The president was Humayun Rashid Choudhury, former Minister of Foreign Affairs of Bangladesh during the presidency of Hussain Muhammad Ershad.

== See also ==
- List of UN General Assembly sessions
- List of General debates of the United Nations General Assembly
