= Synthetic Communications =

- Discipline: Synthesis of organic compounds
- Language: English

Publication details
- History: 1971–present
- Publisher: Taylor & Francis
- Open access: Hybrid
- Impact factor: 2.1 (2022)

Standard abbreviations
- ISO 4: Synth. Commun.

Indexing
- CODEN: SYNCAV
- ISSN: 0039-7911 (print); 1532-2432 (web)
- LCCN: 74617114
- OCLC no.: 421524119

Links
- Journal homepage; Online access; Online archive

Synthetic Communications is a peer-reviewed scientific journal covering the synthesis of organic compounds. It was established in 1971 and is published by Taylor & Francis.

== Abstracting and indexing ==
The journal is abstracted and indexed in:

- Chemical Abstracts Service
- EBSCO databases
- Embase
- ProQuest collections
- Science Citation Index Expanded
- Scopus

According to the Journal Citation Reports, the journal has a 2022 impact factor of 2.1.
