= Gulzar Ahmed Chowdhury =

Bangladesh politician (died 2019)

- গুলজ়ার আহমদ চৌধুরী

Member of Parliament for Sunamganj-3
- In office February 1996 – June 1996
- Preceded by: Abdus Samad Azad
- Succeeded by: Abdus Samad Azad

Personal details
- Born: 1937 Hatiya, Derai, Sunamganj, Bangladesh
- Died: 26 November 2019 (aged 81–82) Dhaka, Bangladesh
- Resting place: Shah Jalal Dargah, Sylhet, Bangladesh
- Party: Ganatantri Party (-1996); Bangladesh Nationalist Party (1996-)
- Spouse: Syeda Zaibunnessa Khatun
- Children: Two daughters and a son

Gulzar Ahmed Chowdhury (Bengali: গুলজ়ার আহমদ চৌধুরী; died 26 November 2019) was a politician in the Sunamganj District of the Sylhet Division of Bangladesh. He was elected member of parliament for the Sunamganj-3 constituency as a Bangladesh Nationalist Party candidate in the sixth Jatiya Sangsad elections held on 15 February 1996.

== Early life and education ==
Chowdhury was born in 1937, to a Bengali Muslim family of Chowdhuries in the village of Hatiya in Derai, Sunamganj, then part of the British Raj. After completing his matriculation from Jagannathpur High School in 1956, Chowdhury enrolled at the Sunamganj College. He was later expelled due to political activities against the ruling Muslim League political party. After being released from prison in 1958, Chowdhury completed his Intermediate of Arts and gained admission into Murari Chand College in 1963. He failed his Bachelor of Arts examinations in 1964 due to his political activities, but graduated from Madaripur Government College in 1966. He was then admitted to study law at the University of Dhaka but did not end up taking the examinations.

== Career ==
During the Bangladesh Liberation War of 1971, Ahmed was one of the student freedom organisers in Derai. He was associated with the Ganatantri Party.

He was elected member of parliament for Sunamganj-3 constituency as a Bangladesh Nationalist Party candidate in the Sixth Jatiya Sangsad elections held on 15 February 1996.

== Personal life ==
He was married to Syeda Zaibunnessa Khatun, a teacher at the Kishori Mohan Girls School. They had one son and two daughters.

== Death ==
Ahmed died at 11:50 BST on 26 November 2019 in his residence in Dhaka, two days after his wife's death. The next day, his first janaza was performed in Chowkidighi Jame Mosque in Sylhet. After Maghrib prayers, his second janaza and burial was undertaken in Shah Jalal Dargah.
