= Shantiganj Upazila =

Shantiganj শান্তিগঞ্জ
- Upazila
- Shantiganj Upazila
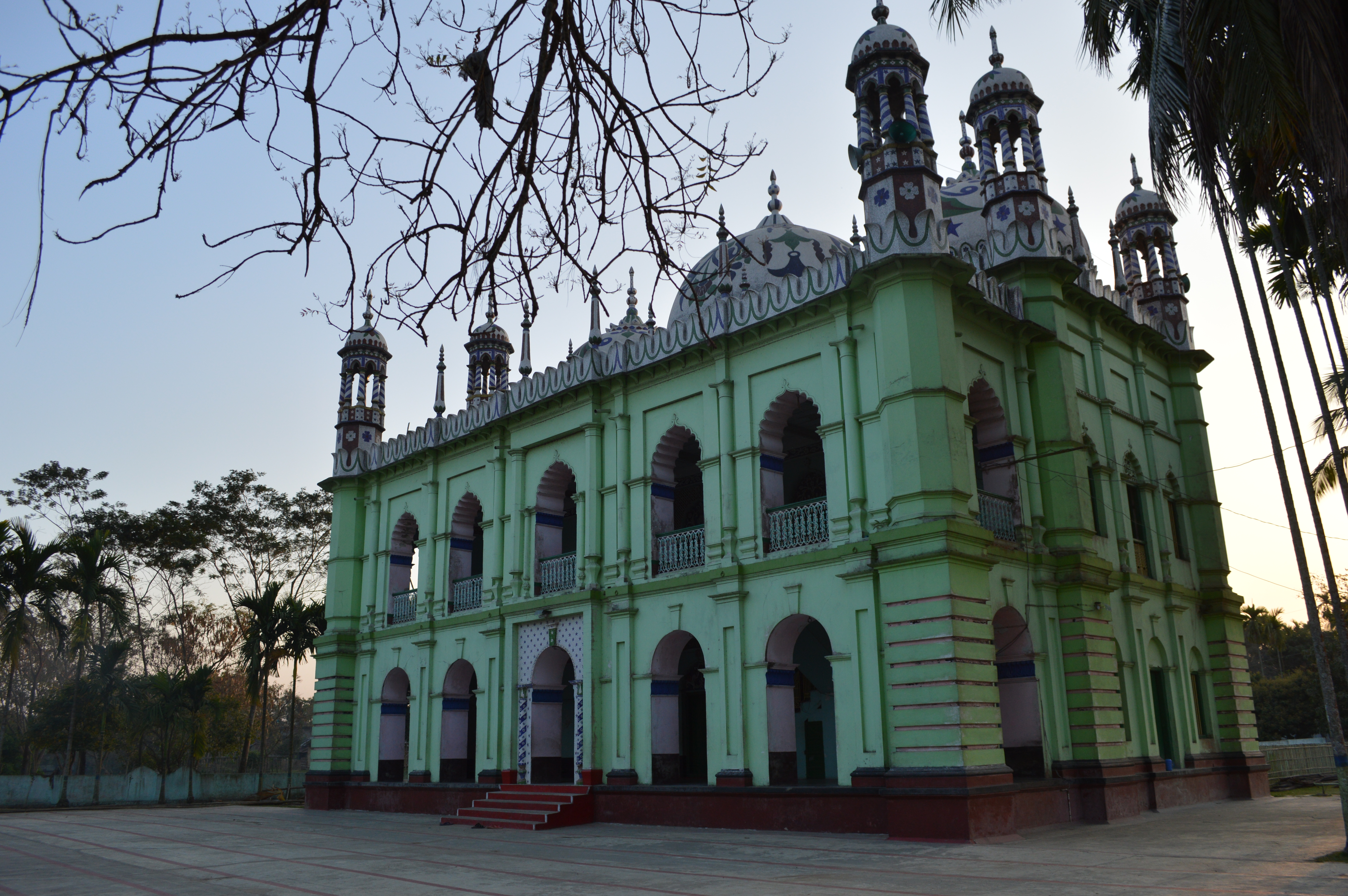
- Pagla Mosque, Shantiganj

- Country: Bangladesh
- Division: Sylhet
- District: Sunamganj
- South Sunamganj: 2006
- Shantiganj: 2021

Government
  - MP (Sunamganj-3): Mohammad Kaisar Ahmed (BNP)
  - Upazila Chairman: Vacant (ad interim)

Area
  - Total: 303.17 km^{2} (117.05 sq mi)

Population (2022)
  - Total: 204,998
  - Density: 676.18/km^{2} (1,751.3/sq mi)
- Demonym: Shantiganji
- Time zone: UTC+6 (BST)
- Postal code: 3001 (Pagla)
- Postal code: 3002 (Patharia)
- Website: southsunamganj.sunamganj.gov.bd

Dakshin Sunamganj Upazila mauza geocode map

Shantiganj (Bengali: শান্তিগঞ্জ, romanized: Shantigônj, formerly known as South Sunamganj or Dakshin Sunamganj (Bengali: দক্ষিণ সুনামগঞ্জ, is an upazila of the Sunamganj District in Sylhet Division, Bangladesh.

== Geography ==
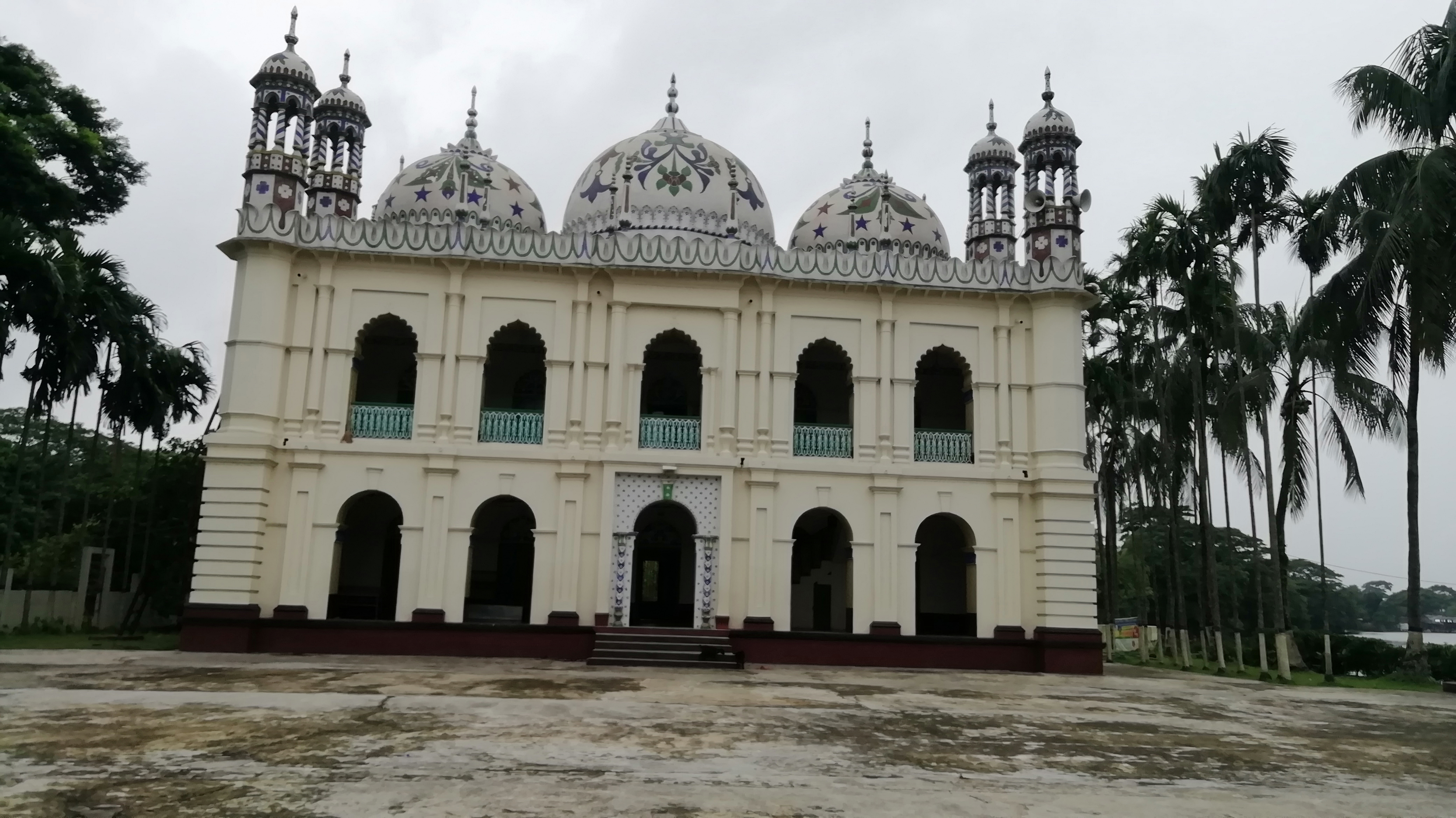
The historic two-storey Pagla Jame Mosque in Raypur founded by local businessman Yasin Mirza in the 1930s with the help of architect Mumin Astagar, a descendant of one of the architects of the Taj Mahal in India.

Shantiganj is located in between 24°49' and 25°10' north latitudes and in between 91°14' and 91°27' east longitudes. It has a total area of 303.17 square kilometres (117.05 sq mi). The Surma River and Kalni River flow through Shantiganj. The Ufa, Karchabarar, Saladia, Behala, Baradal and Basadubi beels are other notable bodies of water in Shantiganj, in addition to the Dekhar haor. The upazila is bounded by Chhatak Upazila and Dowarabazar Upazila to the east, Derai Upazila and Jagannathpur Upazila to its south, Jamalganj Upazila to its west, and Sunamganj Sadar Upazila to its north.

== History ==
Shantiganj was first established as an upazila on 6 June 2006 when it was separated from Sunamganj Sadar Upazila and given the name "South Sunamganj". On 26 July 2021, Khandker Anwarul Islam announced the renaming of South Sunamganj to "Shantiganj".

== Demographics ==
Religions in Shantiganj Upazila (2022)
Religion	Percent
Islam	91.24%
Hinduism	8.75%
Other or not stated	0.01%

According to the 2022 Bangladeshi census, Shantiganj Upazila had 39,142 households and a population of 204,998. 11.35% of the population were under 5 years of age. Shantiganj had a literacy rate (age 7 and over) of 65.17%: 65.89% for males and 64.52% for females, and a sex ratio of 93.15 males for every 100 females. 16,319 (7.96%) lived in urban areas.

According to the 2011 Census of Bangladesh, Shantiganj Upazila had 32,033 households and a population of 183,881. 56,643 (30.80%) were under 10 years of age. Shantiganj had a literacy rate (age 7 and over) of 32.30%, compared to the national average of 51.8%, and a sex ratio of 1021 females per 1000 males. 5,181 (2.82%) lived in urban areas.

With over 32,000 households, majority (80.6%) of these are kancha or kucha houses which are made from mud or clay, while a few are semi or full pucca houses. A small minority of these houses have access to sanitary latrine (29.2%), majority have non-sanitary latrine (60.4%) and 10.4% do not have toilet facilities available. Electricity within the upazila was available to 38.4% of the population.

The population is predominantly Muslim (90.3%) with a small minority of Hindus (9.7%) and very few following other religions.

== Education ==
The literacy rate and school attendance is below average of the Sunamganj District, with 32.30% and 43.8% respectively. There are five madrasas in the upazila, including Jamia Islamia Haji Akram Ali Dakhil Madrasa and Amaria Islamia Alim Madrasa.

== Administration ==
Shantiganj Upazila is divided into eight union parishads: Dargapasha, Joykalash, Paschim Birgaon, Paschim Pagla, Patharia, Purba Birgoan, Purba Pagla, and Shimulbak. The union parishads are subdivided into 102 mauzas and 171 villages.

=== Chairmen ===
List of chairmen
Name	Term	Party
Abul Kalam	2018	Awami League
Faruq Ahmad	2019-present	Independent (formerly Bangladesh Nationalist Party)

== Economy and tourism ==
There are 15 haat bazaars in Shantiganj. These are: Patharia Bazar, Pagla Bazar, Noakhali Bazar, Ganiganj Bazar, Birgaon Bazar, Taila Bazar, Natun Bangla Bazar, Aktapara Bazar, Damodharatapi Bazar, Chikarkandi Bazar, Muradpur Bazar, Jaikalas Bazar, Thakurbhog Bazar, Shantiganj Bazar and Bhamabhami Bazar.

Shantiganj Upazila is home to around 150 mosques, most notable of which is the historic Pagla Jame Mosque.

== Notable people ==
- Muhammad Abdul Mannan, minister, diplomat and bureaucrat
- Faruk Rashid Chowdhury, former Member of Parliament
- Humayun Rashid Choudhury, diplomat and politician
- Shamsun Nahar Begum, former Member of Parliament
