= Shahjalal University of Science and Technology =

Public research university in Sylhet, Bangladesh

Coordinates: 24.9120°N 91.8322°E

- শাহজালাল বিজ্ঞান ও প্রযুক্তি বিশ্ববিদ্যালয়
- Other name: SUST
- Type: Public
- Established: 25 August 1986; 40 years ago
- Accreditation: IEB; IAB; ACU; IAU; FUIW; WHO
- Affiliations: University Grants Commission (UGC)
- Endowment: ৳9.88 billion (US$81 million)(2019)
- Budget: ৳170.8 crore (US$14 million) (2024-2025)
- Chancellor: President of Bangladesh (ex officio)
- Vice-Chancellor: Md. Khairul Islam
- Academic staff: 597
- Students: Approximately 8,900
- Location: Sylhet, Bangladesh
- Campus: Urban 320 acres (1.3 km^{2}) (main campus)
- Website: www.sust.edu

Shahjalal University of Science and Technology (SUST; Bengali: শাহজালাল বিজ্ঞান ও প্রযুক্তি বিশ্ববিদ্যালয়) is a public research university in Sylhet, Bangladesh. It is one of Bangladesh's leading public universities, particularly in science and technology education, and was established as the country's first specialised science and technology university. Founded on 25 August 1986, it began academic activities on 13 February 1991. In the QS Asia University Rankings 2027, SUST placed eighth among 52 ranked universities in Bangladesh and 352nd in Asia.

SUST was an early adopter of the integrated honours curriculum and semester-based teaching in Bangladesh. It also drew national attention for introducing a mobile-phone-based university admissions system and for an international award won by a student team in the NASA International Space Apps Challenge.

The university is based at Kumargaon, on the outskirts of Sylhet. Its teaching and research span science, engineering, technology, environmental studies, business, the humanities and social sciences. According to its published institutional figures, it has six academic schools, 27 departments and three institutes, with approximately 8,900 students and 597 academic staff.

== History ==
=== Establishment and expansion ===
SUST was established in August 1986 and admitted its first students in February 1991. Its initial academic provision consisted of three departments: Physics, Chemistry and Economics. The first intake comprised 205 students taught by 13 academic staff. Sadruddin Ahmed Chowdhury served as the founding vice-chancellor.

The university subsequently broadened its teaching beyond the natural sciences to include engineering, business, humanities and social sciences. It was the first university in Bangladesh to introduce an integrated honours course and adopted the semester system in the 1996–97 academic session. These changes were among the university's early contributions to teaching practice in Bangladeshi higher education.

In September 2009, SUST introduced a mobile-phone-based admission registration system through which applicants could submit information and pay admission-related fees by SMS. The initiative was reported as an early example of paperless university admissions in Bangladesh.

=== Student movements and recent developments ===
In January 2022, students protested against the administration of vice-chancellor Farid Uddin Ahmed following a dispute over residential hall management and police action against demonstrators. A group of students began a hunger strike demanding his resignation. The strike ended on 26 January after intervention by former SUST academics Muhammad Zafar Iqbal and Yasmeen Haque, although students initially said that their wider protest would continue.

SUST students also participated in the 2024 Bangladesh quota reform movement. The university announced an indefinite closure in July 2024 amid the national protests, a decision contested by students. Following the 2024 political upheaval, the university revised its residential hall allocation system. Reporting in June 2026 described a reduction in political influence over hall allocations, while also recording students' concerns about accommodation, healthcare and opportunities for extracurricular activities.

== Governance and administration ==
SUST is governed under the Shahjalal University of Science and Technology Act, 1987. The President of Bangladesh is the university's chancellor. The vice-chancellor is its principal executive officer.

In May 2026, Professor Md. Khairul Islam, previously head of the Department of Business Administration and a former dean, was appointed vice-chancellor, succeeding A. M. Sarwaruddin Chowdhury.

== Academics ==
=== Schools and departments ===
The university's published institutional information identifies six schools and 27 academic departments. The schools and their principal disciplines are:

- School of Agriculture and Mineral Sciences: Forestry and Environmental Science.
- School of Applied Sciences and Technology: Architecture; Chemical Engineering and Polymer Science; Civil and Environmental Engineering; Computer Science and Engineering; Electrical and Electronic Engineering; Food Engineering and Tea Technology; Industrial and Production Engineering; Mechanical Engineering; and Petroleum and Mining Engineering.
- School of Life Sciences: Biochemistry and Molecular Biology; Genetic Engineering and Biotechnology.
- School of Management and Business Administration: Business Administration.
- School of Physical Sciences: Chemistry; Geography and Environment; Mathematics; Oceanography; Physics; and Statistics.
- School of Social Sciences: Anthropology; Bangla; Economics; English; Political Studies; Public Administration; Social Work; and Sociology.

The university also has institutes offering specialist academic provision, including the Institute of Information and Communication Technology and the Institute of Modern Languages. Its programmes include undergraduate degrees, taught master's degrees and research qualifications such as MPhil and PhD.

=== Admission and teaching ===
Admission to SUST's undergraduate programmes is highly competitive. For the 2025–26 academic session, 75,023 applicants applied for 1,566 advertised places, with additional places reserved under specified quota categories. Applicants are selected through entrance examinations and academic results, in accordance with the criteria for each session. Admission procedures and entry requirements are published through the university's official admissions portal.

The academic calendar is organised into semesters. The university offers undergraduate degrees, taught master's programmes and research degrees, with teaching and research extending to the humanities, social sciences, languages, business and environmental studies as well as science and engineering.

== Research and innovation ==
Research at SUST is undertaken through its academic departments, laboratories and research centres. The university's disciplines include computing, engineering, the physical and life sciences, environmental research and social science. SUST is included in the Nature Index, which tracks research published in a selected group of scholarly journals; for the period July 2025 to June 2026, it was tenth among Bangladeshi academic institutions by the index's fractional research-output measure.

In the 2018 NASA International Space Apps Challenge, a team of SUST students known as Olik won the Best Use of Data award. Their project, Lunar VR, was a virtual-reality application using space data to visualise aspects of lunar exploration. The award was announced in February 2019.

In February 2026, the Department of Political Studies established an election research laboratory to examine elections, voting patterns and electoral processes.

== Rankings ==
University rankings

Global – Overall
- QS World: 1201-1400 (2026)
- THE World: 1201-1500 (2026)

Global – Science and engineering
- THE Engineering: 1001+ (2025)
- THE Physical Sciences: 1001+ (2025)

Regional – Overall
- QS Asia: 337 (2026)

SUST has appeared among Bangladesh's higher-ranked universities in international ranking exercises. In the QS Asia University Rankings 2026, it was ranked 337th in Asia and eighth among Bangladeshi institutions. In the 2027 edition, it ranked 352nd in Asia and eighth nationally, among the 52 Bangladeshi institutions included.

In the QS World University Rankings 2027, SUST was placed in the 1401+ band globally. These ranking systems measure different aspects of university performance, and their results should not be treated as interchangeable.

== Campus and student life ==
=== Campus ===
The university's main campus occupies approximately 320 acres (1.3 km^{2}) in Kumargaon, Sylhet. It includes academic and administrative buildings, laboratories, a central library, student accommodation and recreational facilities.

=== Library ===
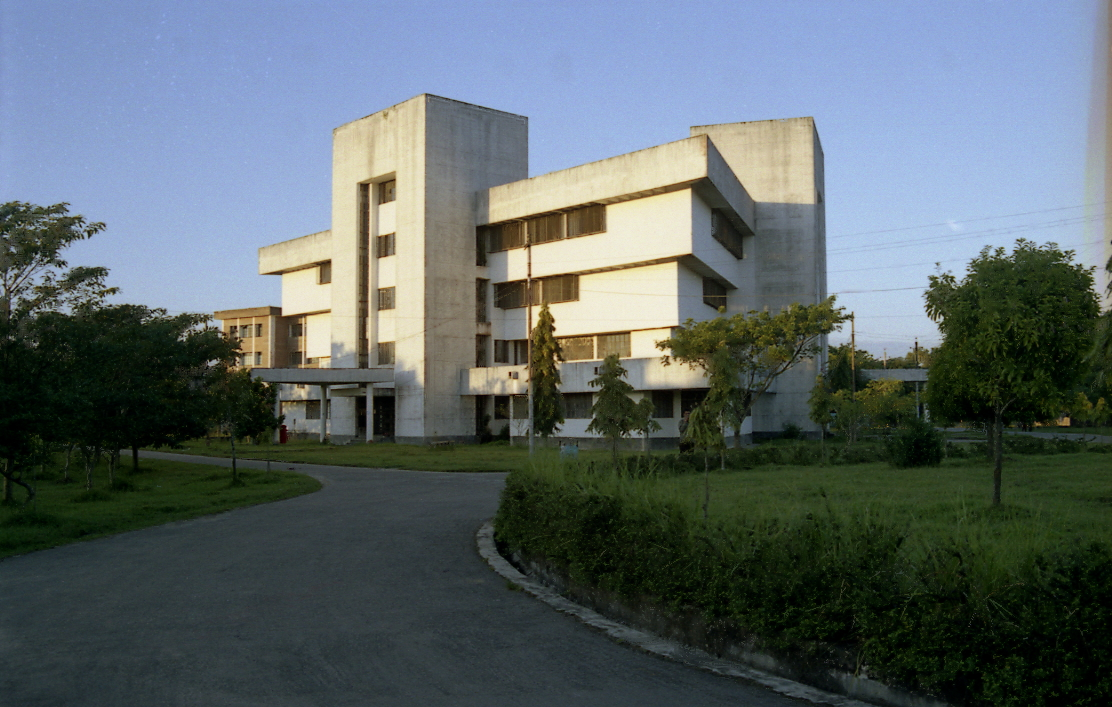
University Central Library

The central library provides a catalogue of printed materials, electronic research resources and an institutional repository. Its online public access catalogue enables users to search the library's collections.

=== Student accommodation ===
As of 2026, SUST had six operating residential halls, three for male students and three for female students. Some students live in privately arranged accommodation outside the campus.

In September 2025, the university renamed three halls, including Bangabandhu Sheikh Mujibur Rahman Hall, which became Bijoy 24 Hall. It also approved names for three halls then under construction. The announcement distinguished those planned halls from the existing accommodation.

=== Societies and activities ===
Student activities have included debating, theatre, music, film, photography, science competitions, sport and volunteering. Among the university's longstanding student organisations are theatre and debate groups and the cultural organisation Shikor. A 2026 report in Prothom Alo found that cultural programmes had declined following the 2024 political changes, with student organisers citing timetable pressures and difficulties securing support for events.

=== International students ===
SUST also welcomes foreign students. There is a significant number of international students, especially from Nepal. There are also some students in its affiliated medical college from India controlled Kashmir . Every year SUST receives applications from abroad. Most international students come from Nepal, India, Pakistan, Saudi Arabia, Sri Lanka, Maldives, Bhutan, Japan, Afghanistan, Thailand, Malaysia, Palestine, China, Finland, and Myanmar.

=== Halls of residence ===
Bijoy 24 Hall

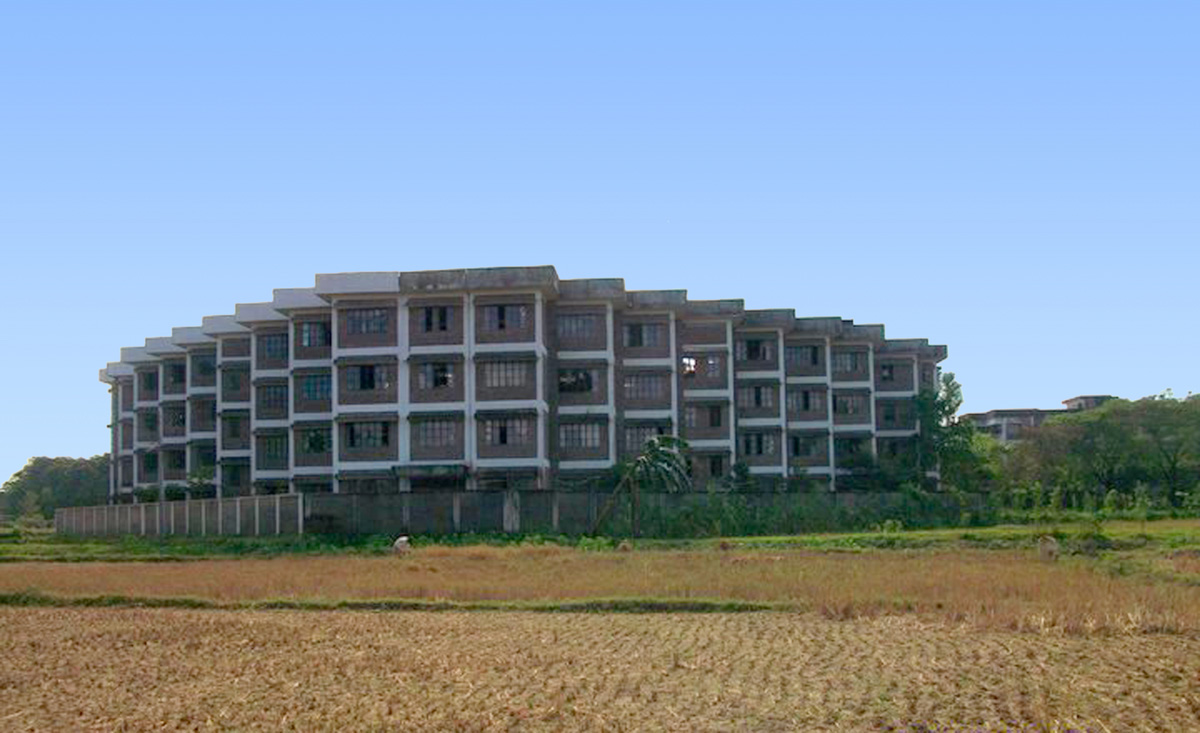
Aisha Siddika Hall

Currently, there are nine halls of residence. A significant number of students reside privately near the university area of Sylhet metro.

- Shah Paran Hall
- Bijoy 24 Hall
- Syed Mujtaba Ali Hall
- Gazi Burhan Uddin Hall
- Begum Sirajunnesa Chowdhury Hall
- Aisha Siddika Hall
- Fatima Tuz Zahra Hall
- Sumayya Bint Khubbat Hall
- M Saifur Rahman Hall (for international students)

=== Photos of SUST ===
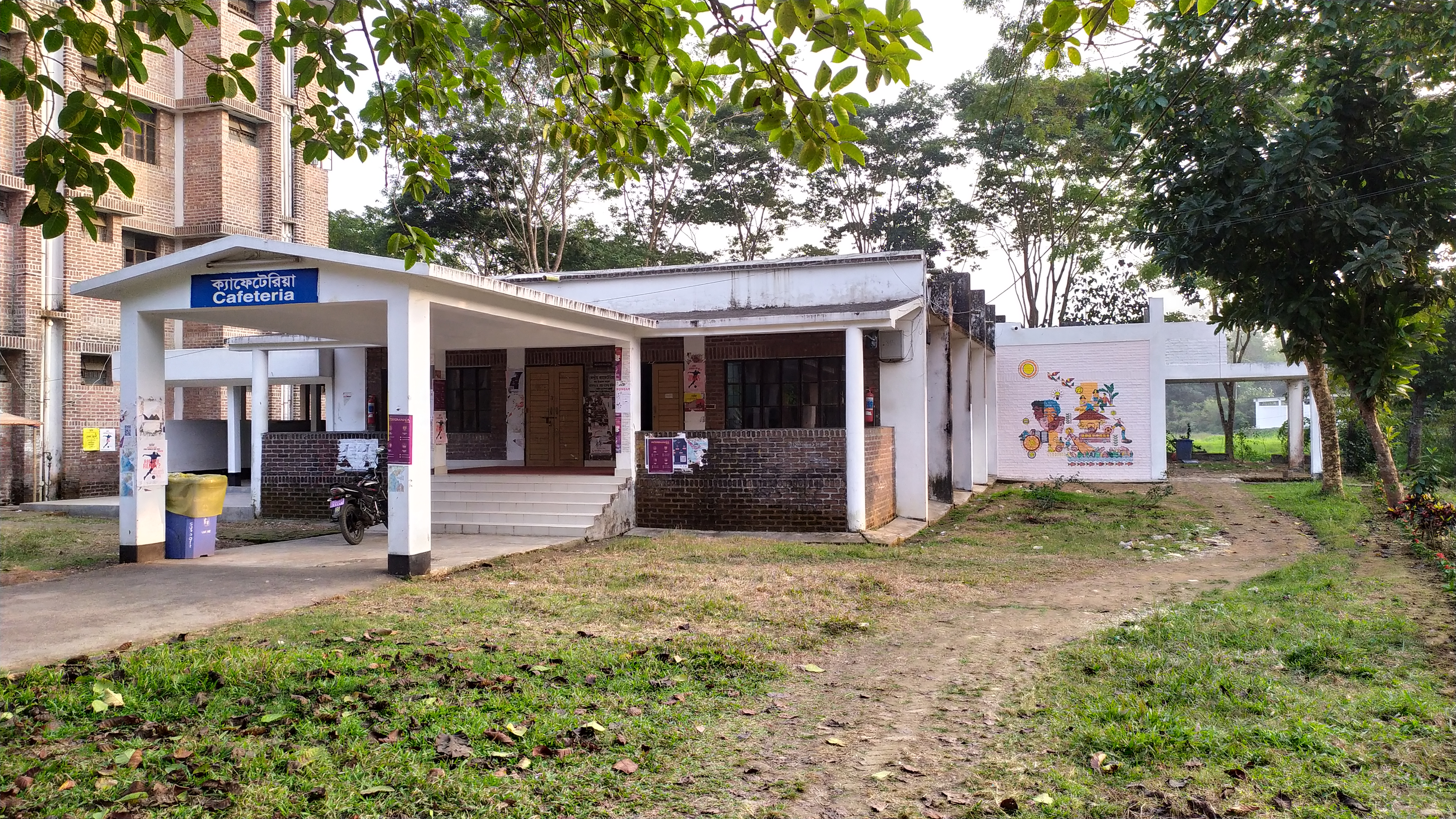
Cafeteria

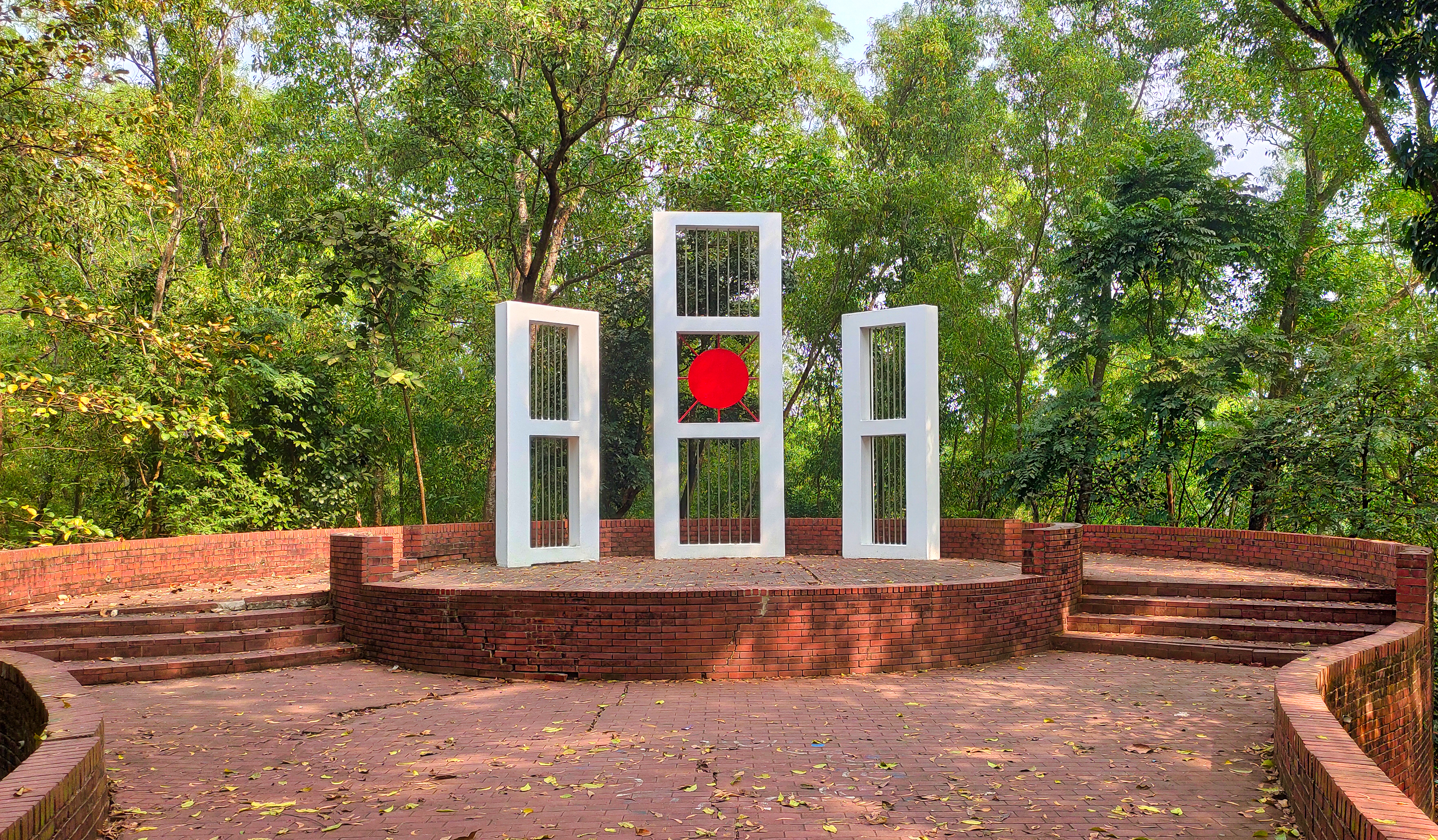
Shahid Minar

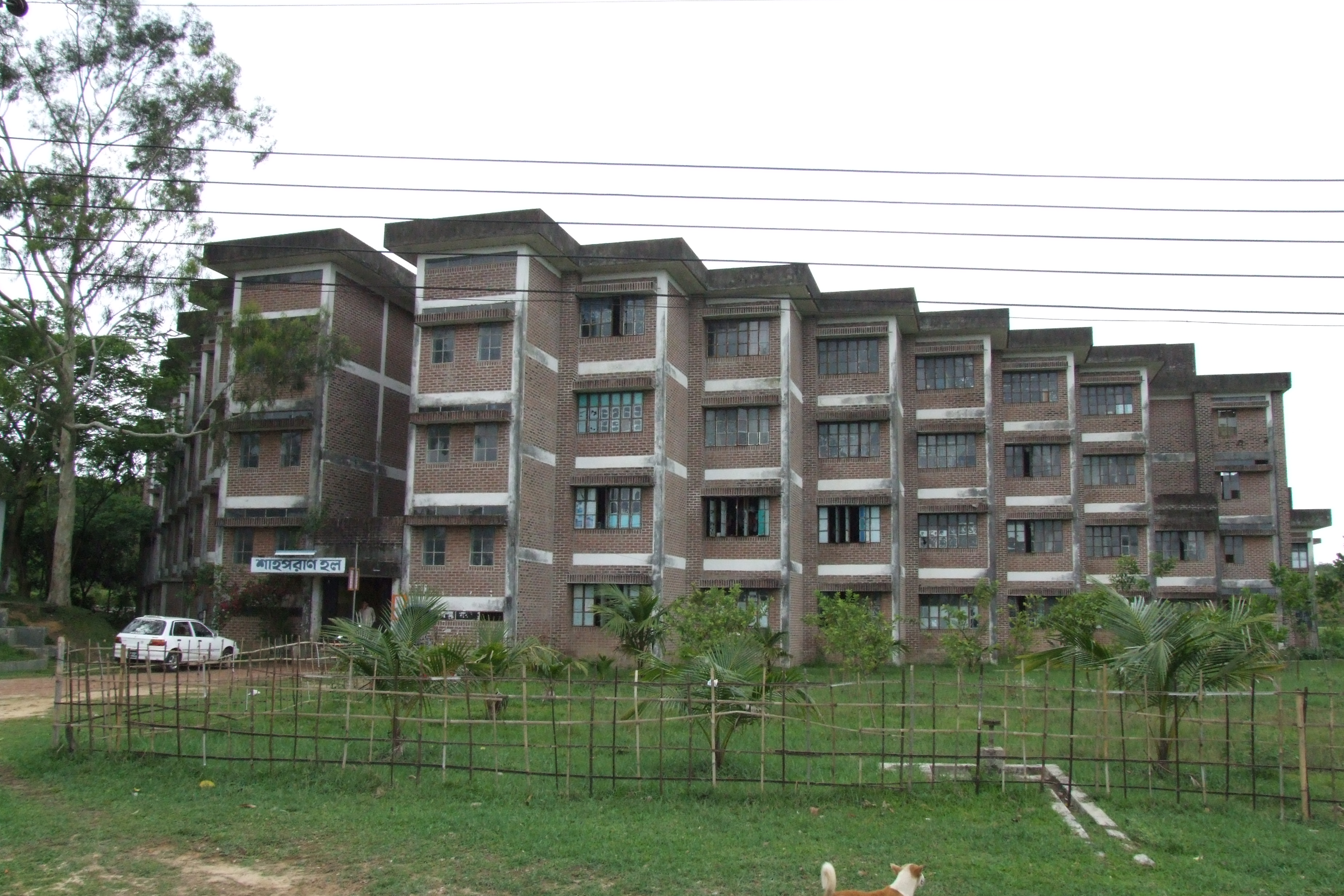
Shah Paran Hall

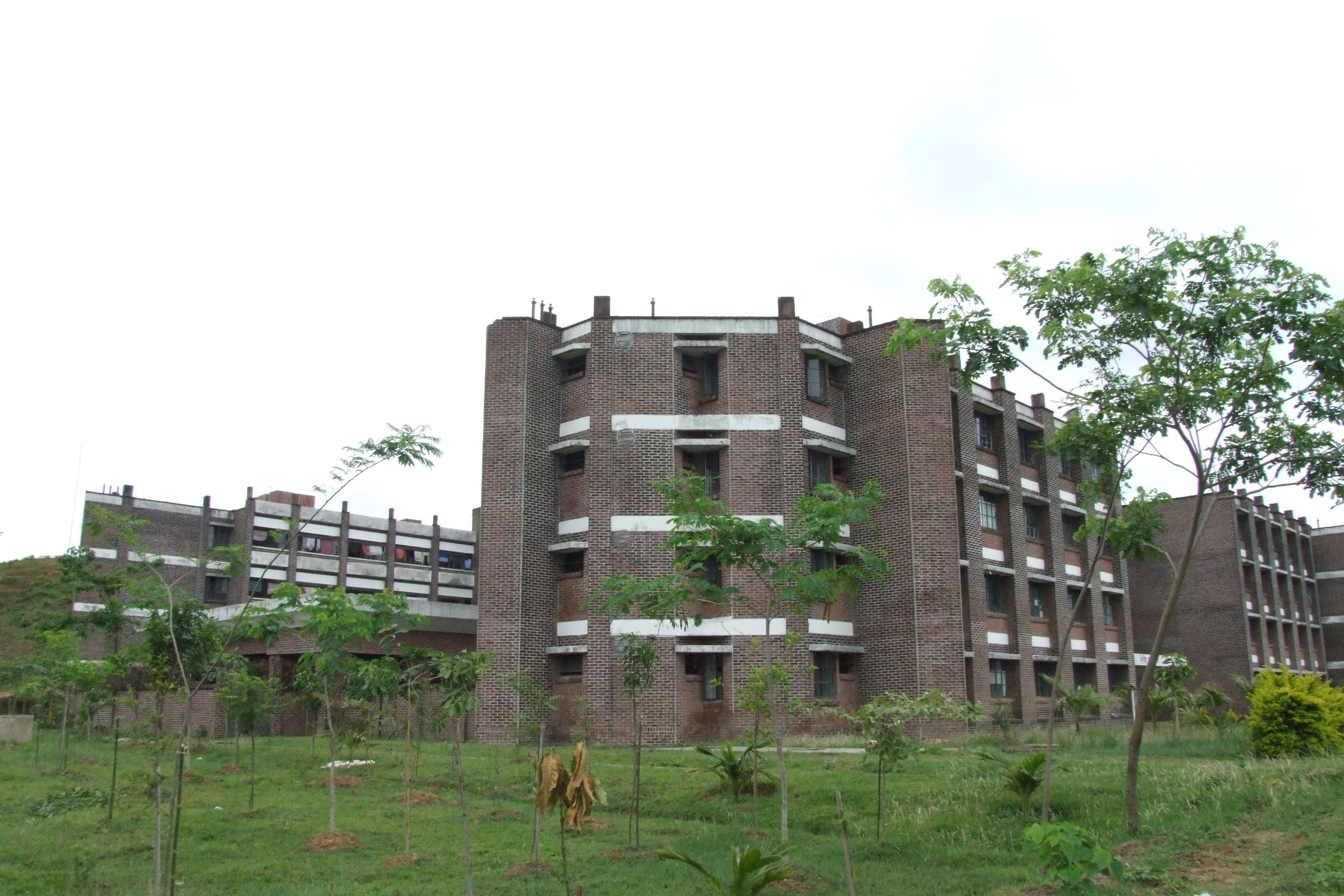
Bijoy 24 Hall

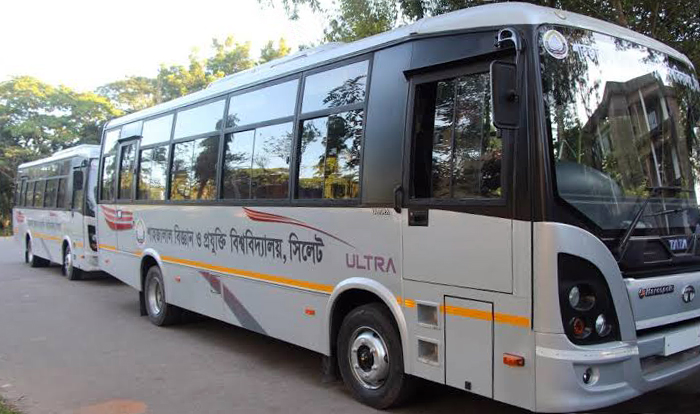
Transport vehicle

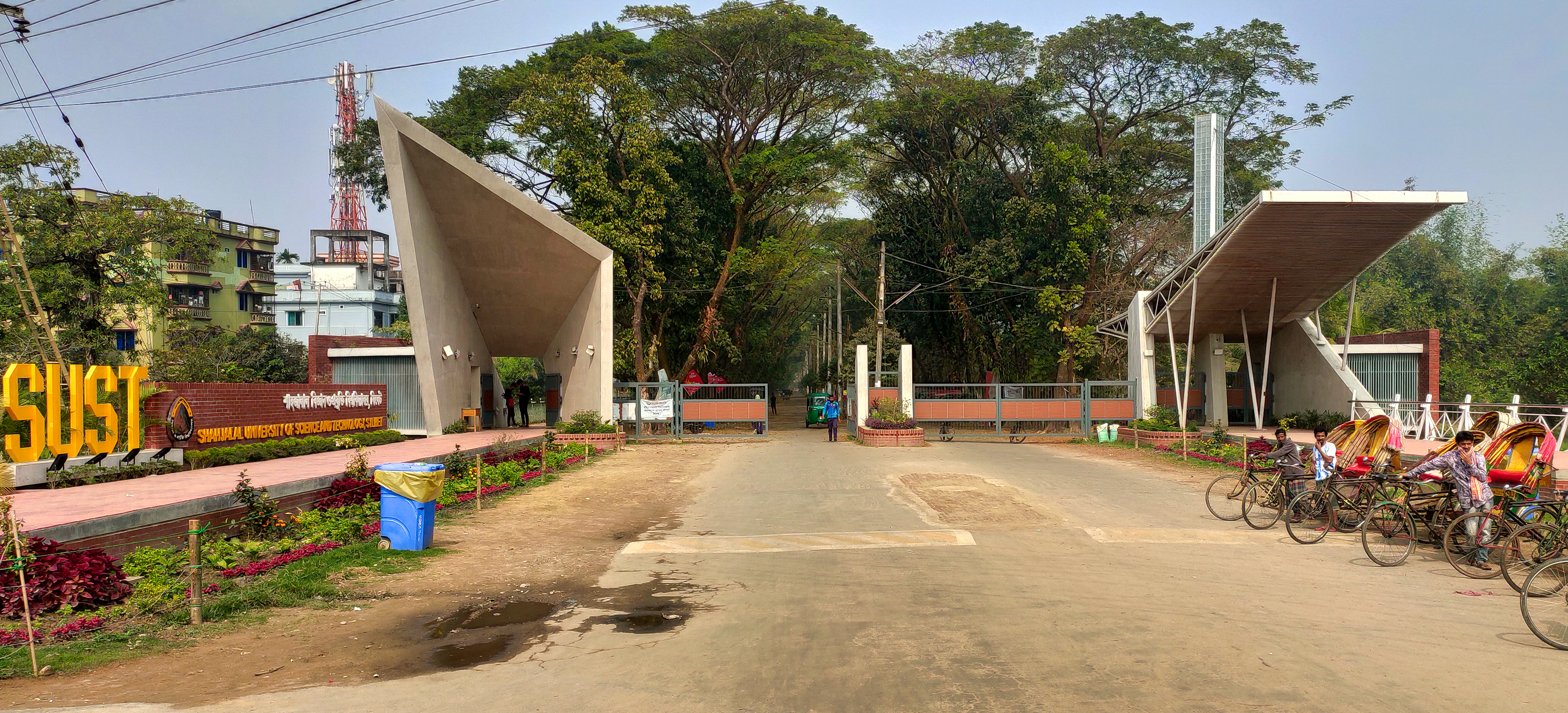
Main entry gate

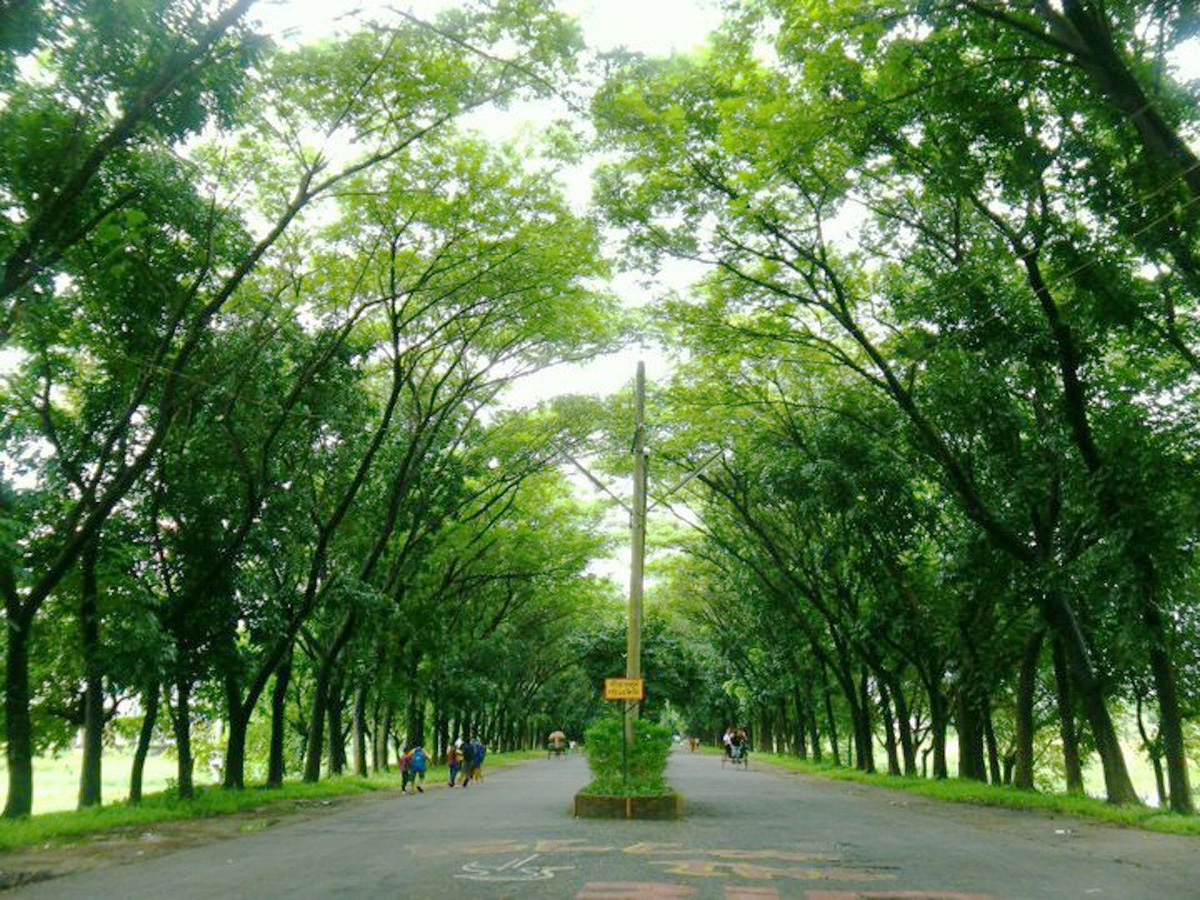
The 1 km entranceway to SUST campus

== Awards ==
- National ICT Award (2017)

== Notable people ==
- Sadruddin Ahmed Chowdhury, scientist and founder vice-chancellor of SUST
- Arun Kumar Basak, founder professor, Department of Physics, professor emeritus of physics at University of Rajshahi
- Md. Khalilur Rahman, Professor of SUST, Former Chief Scientific Officer at Bangladesh Council of Scientific and Industrial Research, former researcher at Imperial College London and at Pakistan Atomic Energy Commission
- Mustafizur Rahman, Distinguished Professor at SUST, a monumental figure in micro/nano-machining and former Professor at National University of Singapore, Tokyo Institute of Technology and the University of Florida
- Muhammad Zafar Iqbal, retired professor, Department of Computer Science & Engineering, and writer
- Md. Forhad Siddique, SUST alumni and Director General, Bangladesh Sangbad Sangstha
- Farzana Hussain, SUST alumni and Chair of Mathematics, Huston–Tillotson University
- Muhammad J. A. Shiddiky, SUST amumni and Distinguished Professor, Charles Sturt University (Australia)
- Dr. Murshed Siddick, SUST alumni and Statistical Programming Lead, Johnson & Johnson (UK)

== See also ==
- List of universities in Bangladesh
- Bangladesh University of Engineering and Technology (BUET)
- Bangladesh University of Textiles (BUTEX)
