= Sunamganj-1 =

Constituency of Bangladesh's Jatiya Sangsad

Coordinates: 24.90°N 91.01°E

- Constituency for the Jatiya Sangsad
- District: Sunamganj District
- Division: Sylhet Division
- Electorate: 399,359 (2018)

Current constituency
- Created: 1984
- Party: Bangladesh Nationalist Party.
- Member: Kamruzzaman Kamrul
- ← 223 Shariatpur 3 225 Sunamganj-2 →

Sunamganj-1 is a constituency represented in the Jatiya Sangsad (National Parliament) of Bangladesh since 2026 by Kamruzzaman Kamrul of the Bangladesh Nationalist Party.

== Boundaries ==
The constituency encompasses Dharamapasha, Jamalganj, Tahirpur, and Madhyanagar upazilas.

== History ==
The constituency was created in 1984 from a Sylhet constituency when the former Sylhet District was split into four districts: Sunamganj, Sylhet, Moulvibazar, and Habiganj.

== Members of Parliament ==
Election	Member	Party
1986	Prasun Kalin Roy	Communist Party
1988	Badruddoza Ahmed Shuja	
1991	Nozir Hossain	Communist Party
Feb 1996	Nozir Hossain	Bangladesh Nationalist Party
Jun 1996	Syed Rafiqul Haque	Awami League
2001	Nozir Hossain	Bangladesh Nationalist Party
2008	Moazzem Hossain Ratan	Awami League
2024	Ranjit Chandra Sarkar	Awami League
2026	Kamruzzaman Kamrul	Bangladesh Nationalist Party

== Elections ==
=== Elections in the 2010s ===
General Election 2014: Sunamganj-1
Party	Candidate	Votes	%	±%
AL	Moazzem Hossain Ratan	88,981	73.2	+14.9
Independent	Syed Rafiqul Haque	32,581	26.8	N/A
Majority		56,400	46.4	+23.6
Turnout		121,562	34.6	−52.1
AL hold				

=== Elections in the 2000s ===
General Election 2008: Sunamganj-1
Party	Candidate	Votes	%	±%
AL	Moazzem Hossain Ratan	155,252	58.3	+15.9
BNP	Rafiq Chowdhury	94,458	35.5	−21.4
Independent	Nozir Hossain	16,716	6.3	N/A
Majority		60,794	22.8	+8.2
Turnout		266,426	86.7	+10.5
AL gain from BNP				

General Election 2001: Sunamganj-1
Party	Candidate	Votes	%	±%
BNP	Nozir Hossain	128,448	56.9	+16.0
AL	Suranjit Sen Gupta	95,574	42.4	+0.6
IJOF	Md. Ali Hossain	1,224	0.5	N/A
Jatiya Party (M)	Badruddoza Ahmed Shuja	329	0.1	N/A
Majority		32,874	14.6	+13.7
Turnout		225,575	76.2	+3.0
BNP gain from AL				

=== Elections in the 1990s ===
General Election June 1996: Sunamganj-1
Party	Candidate	Votes	%	±%
AL	Syed Rafiqul Haque	68,787	41.8	N/A
BNP	Nozir Hossain	67,312	40.9	+23.0
JP(E)	Ali Amzad	16,668	10.1	N/A
Jamaat	Muslem Uddin	6,345	3.9	−3.1
Gano Forum	Md. Mosharof Hossain	4,154	2.5	N/A
Zaker Party	Jainal Abedin	710	0.4	N/A
WPB	Tarek-Al-Moin	438	0.3	N/A
Majority		1,475	0.9	−10.8
Turnout		164,414	73.2	+25.3
AL gain from BNP				

General Election 1991: Sunamganj-1
Party	Candidate	Votes	%	±%
CPB	Nozir Hussain	44,117	36.9	
Jatiya Samajtantrik Dal-JSD	Ali Amzad	30,187	25.3	
BNP	Muktar Hossain	21,391	17.9	
Independent	Shahjahan	13,224	11.1	
Jamaat	Muslem Uddin	8,371	7.0	
Independent	Syed Rafiqul Haque	1,150	1.0	
Independent	A. Nur Akhonjit	961	0.8	
NDP	Badruddoza Ahmed Shuja	132	0.1	
Majority		13,930	11.7	
Turnout		119,533	47.9	
CPB gain from				
