= Nozir Hossain =

Bangladeshi politician (1948/1949–2024)

- নজির হোসেন

Sunamganj-1 Jatiya Sangsad
- In office 1991 – February 1996
- Preceded by: Badruddoza Ahmed Shuja
- Succeeded by: Syed Rafiqul Haque

Sunamganj-1 Jatiya Sangsad
- In office 2001–2008
- Preceded by: Syed Rafiqul Haque
- Succeeded by: Moazzem Hossain Ratan

Personal details
- Born: 1948/1949 Sunamganj District, Chittagong Division, East Bengal, Pakistan
- Died: 28 March 2024 (aged 75) Sunamganj, Bangladesh
- Party: Communist Party of Bangladesh (before 15 October 1993); Bangladesh Nationalist Party
- Spouse: Salma Akhter
- Children: Ibrahim Hussain

Nozir Hossain (1948/1949 – 28 March 2024) was a Bangladeshi politician in Sunamganj District of Sylhet Division. He was elected the first Member of Parliament from the Communist Party of Bangladesh in the Sunamganj-1 seat in the 1991 Jatiya Sangsad. He joined the Bangladesh Nationalist Party on 15 October 1993. Later, for the second time in February 1996 and for the third time in 2001 the Bangladesh Nationalist Party was elected to the same seat.

== Early life ==
Nozir Hossain was born in Sunamganj district.

== Political life ==
Hossain was once the leader of the Communist Party of Bangladesh (CPB). He was elected the first Member of Parliament from the Communist Party of Bangladesh in the Sunamganj-1 seat in the 1991 Jatiya Sangsad. He joined the Bangladesh Nationalist Party on 15 October 1993. Later, for the second time in February 1996 and for the third time in 2001 the Bangladesh Nationalist Party was elected to the same seat. He was defeated in the June 1996 election.

Hossain was a member of the Bangladesh Nationalist Party's Central Executive Committee. For 10 years Sunamganj was the BNP's general secretary. He served as the president of the district BNP for five years. During the tenure of the BNP government, he served as the chairman of the Standing Committee on the Ministry of Expatriates' Welfare of 2001.

Hossain was defeated as an independent candidate from the two seats of Sunamganj-4 and Sunamganj-1 in the national election of 2008. He was defeated as a candidate of the Bangladesh Nationalist Party from Sunamganj-1 in the 2018 national election.

== Death ==
Hossain died on 28 March 2024, at the age of 75.

== See also ==
- 1991 Bangladeshi general election
- 2001 Bangladeshi general election
