= Kamruzzaman Kamrul =

Bangladeshi politician

- কামরুজ্জামান কামরুল

Member of the Bangladesh Parliament for Sunamganj-1
- Incumbent
- Assumed office 17 February 2026
- Preceded by: Moazzem Hossain Ratan

Personal details
- Born: 7 January 1978 (age 48) Tahirpur Upazila, Sunamganj District
- Party: Bangladesh Nationalist Party

Kamruzzaman Kamrul is a Bangladeshi politician of the Bangladesh Nationalist Party. He is currently serving as a member of parliament from Sunamganj-1 .

== Early life ==
Kamruzzaman Kamrul was born on 7 January in 1978 at Tahirpur Upazila under Sunamganj District.
