= Nirmalendu Chowdhury =

Indian singer (1922–1981)

Nirmalendu Choudhury
- Born: 27 July 1922; Sukhair Rajbari Dharampasha, Sunamganj, Bangladesh
- Died: 18 April 1981 (aged 58) Calcutta, West Bengal, India
- Occupations: Folk musician, singer, artist, playback singer

Nirmalendu Chowdhury (Bengali: নির্মলেন্দু চৌধুরী) (27 July 1922 – 18 April 1981) was a Bengali musician, composer, lyricist and singer, who contributed significantly to the Folk music of Eastern India, particularly of Bengal and Assam.

== Early life ==
Nirmalendu was born in his maternal house, the Sukhair Jomidar Bari, in the village of Sukhair in Dharampasha, Sunamganj of Sylhet District on 27 July 1922 in an aristocratic Mahishya Zamindar family. He grew up in the village of Bahely, Jamalgunj subdivision of Sunamganj in his ancestral house, the Bahely Jomidar Bari. His father was Nalini Nath Chowdhury and mother Smt. Snehalata Chowdhury. His eartly education was started at Bahely Primary School. Later his family shifted to Lamabazar of Sylhet and Nirmalendu was admitted to Rasomoy Memorial school. After passing the Matriculation examination he joined MC College for graduation course.

== Education and training in music ==
Nirmalendu was inspired by his parents to take up music as his profession from his early days. Nirmalendu's family shifted from Sylhet to Mymensingh, Nirmalendu got an opportunity to learn folk songs from two noted exponents of folk music of that time, Abdul Majid and Abdur Rahim. He learned Rabindra Sangeet from Sri Ashok Bijoy Raha at Shantiniketan. After coming to Calcutta he took Talim from Sri Suresh Chakraborty.

== Member of the Communist Party ==
After joining Murari Chand College Nirmalendu got involved in the activities of the Communist Party. At age twenty he became a member of the Party in 1941. Song became an instrument for awakening the masses against the oppression of the British, and Nirmalendu engaged himself fully in that pursuit. During this time he traveled extensively in the rural areas and was exposed to the varied and rich folk songs and folk culture of Bengal, Sylhet in particular. He got acquainted with Hemanga Biswas, another son of the soil of Sylhet, who was a proficient musician and politically aligned to the Communist Party. Nirmalendu sang many songs created by Hemanga Biswas in public rallies and meetings.

== Career in music ==
Nirmalendu started appearing in public functions at an early age. Sometime before 1953 he migrated to India. His fame spread. During 1953, Anil Kumar Chanda, the then Deputy Minister of External Affairs, invited Nirmalendu and his brother Nirendu Chowdhury to join an Indian Cultural Delegation to Eastern European countries as a preparatory program for Pandit Jawahar Lal Nehru's visit to Soviet Union and other countries. Dancer Sitara Devi, vocalist Lalita S Ubhayakar, Rabidra Sangeet artist Dwijen Mukhopadhyay, Tabalia pandit Samta Prasad were among others in the delegation. In 1955, Nirmalendu performed in the grand Bolshoi Theater in Moscow in the presence of Nikita Khrushchev, and later won a gold medal singing at an international folk song convention in Warsaw. He took part in several cultural missions abroad. His performances in Warsaw, Sofia, Prague, Belgrade and Moscow were received by the people with great accolade making Indian folk songs popular to outside world. He visited many countries including Soviet Union, Yugoslavia, Poland, Hungary, Romania, Czechoslovakia, Bulgaria, Australia, New Zealand, China, United Kingdom, France, Germany, Holland, Finland, US, Canada, and Japan.

His notable performance was in 1955 in the Banga Sanskrit Sammelan (Bengal Cultural Conference), Kolkata. He recorded more than a hundred songs. He was associated with films as a playback singer and actor. He was also a reputed composer. His collection of songs was published as Epar Bangla Opar Banglar Gan (Songs of both Bengals).

== Forms of music ==
Nirmalendu helped in revitalization and propagation of various forms of folk songs of Bengal, Assam and Tripura. Some examples are:

- Bhatiali
- Bhaoaiya
- Dhamail
- Jhumur
- Sari
- Tusu

== Other activities ==
IPTA

Nirmalendu was involved with Indian People's Theatre Association (IPTA) from an early age. He took park in propaganda meetings, songs and drama. He took part in the drama Shaheeder Daak and others, composed by Hemango Biswas.

Theater and drama

Nirmalendu acted in theatrical plays along with Utpal Dutta in Aungar (অঙ্গার), Pherari Phauj (ফেরারী ফৌজ) and Titas Ekti Nodir Naam"(তিতাস একটি নদীর নাম).

Movies

- In 1954 Nirmalendu lent his voice for playback in the song "Maajhi re chal naiya, raam karega paar" in the Hindi movie Biraj Bahu, for which the music was composed by Salil Chowdhury.
- Nirmalendu sang for many Bengali movies.
- Nirmalendu took part in acting in Bengali films, such as গঙ্গা, কাঞ্চন মালা, নতুন ফসল and ডাকাতের হাতে বুলু.

== Awards ==
He was awarded the Padma Bhushan by the Government of India for his contribution to folk music.

== Memoirs ==
- Khaled Choudhury remembered an event during 1938 when he first met Nirmalendu. In his own words:
  "It was 1938 and I was then quite grown up... The World War broke out... I met a gentleman named Binod Bandhu Das, visiting there, who was a member of the Communist Party... Subsequently, one day, during the days of famine, he called me to a propaganda meeting... In that meeting, two handsome persons and a lady presented enchanting songs. They were Himango Biswas, Nirmalendu Choudhury and Santa Biswas."
- Ustad Vilayat Khan, in his autobiographical accounts, mentioned about his acquaintances with and admiration to Nirmalendu Choudhury through a story which is heart touching. In 1955 Pandit Jawaharlal Nehru, the Prime Minister of India, visited Russia, and an Indian Cultural delegation accompanied him where Ustad Vilayat Khan was a member. Since then many years passed. Sometime during 1990s Khan Sahib called his friend in Kolkata and asked about a song which he heard in Russia in 1955, a song sung by an Indian folk singer, who was none other than Nirmalendu Chowdhury. Namita Devidayal writes:
  "As the lights dimmed in the grand Bolshoi Theatre in Moscow, and the Russian sopranos’ voices soared divinely, the young Vilayat Khan started worrying about how the Indian performers could match this beauty. That was when one of the delegates, a Bengali folk singer called Nirmalendu Chowdhury, went on stage and sang the startlingly beautiful song that Khansahib was now haunted by.

Like many magical memories that get eroded in the flow of life, the words of the song had gone. What remained was the emotion. Now, so many years later, he wanted to sing the song. The folk singer had long since died, but his son Utpalendu Chowdhury was singing the same songs. Jayanta-da managed to get in touch with him. He called him that very day and said that Vilayat Khan wanted to meet him. The surprised singer agreed to come across...

The folk singer arrived in the morning. Vilayat spoke to him about the cultural delegation to Moscow and the lovely time he had with his father. Then he got straight to the point. He brought up the boat and the trees and hummed the tune.

‘Can you teach it to me?’

Utpalendu looked aghast. ‘Sure,’ he mumbled...

Vilayat Khan sat on the floor next to him.

‘What are you doing, Khansahib? You can't sit there. Please sit on the couch.’

‘No, I am fine here. Today, I am the student and you are the teacher.’

Utpalendu smiled. He shut his eyes and sweetly sang the song for Vilayat Khan. Khansahib smiled as well as he wrote the words on a piece of paper in Urdu. About a month later, Vilayat Khan was performing at the Ramakrishna Mission outside Calcutta. He announced, ‘I want you to hear this folk tune which I had heard Nirmalendu Chowdhury sing many many years ago. It is an ode to all the boatmen who drift along the rivers of Bengal ...’. He sang it beautifully, and the audience found themselves immersed in all the beauty and sadness of their land... "

- Manabendra Mukherjee saw Nirmalendu in a music program at Beliaghata some time in the 1950s. In an interview taken by Sri Nimai Bhattacharya on behalf of Doordarshan Kolkata, Manabendra narrated the story. There was a heavy gathering of audience in the tune of five thousand people. Artists were waiting for the program to start. Suddenly the power went out and the microphone stopped working. In this situation one young man approached and offered to sing in front of the impatient audience without microphone. When he was allowed, he mesmerized the audience and charmed all artists with his deep and open voice and songs of the boatmen and the farmers of rural Bengal. When asked what his name was it was learnt that he was none other than Nirmalendu.

== Death ==
Nirmalendu died in Kolkata on 18 April 1981. His son Utpalendu Choudhury carried on the task of propagating and popularizing folk music in line with his father until he died on 7 February 2011.

== Legacy ==
Nirmalendu Chowdhury set up Lok Bharati, a school for folk music in Kolkata. He was associated with PRAGATI LEKHAK SANGHA (Progressive Writers Association) and Bharatiya Gana Natya, a theater group. He also worked for some time as a reader in the Music Department at Rabindra Bharati University.
