= Bidhan Ranjan Roy Poddar =

Bangladeshi political adviser

- বিধান রঞ্জন রায় পোদ্দার
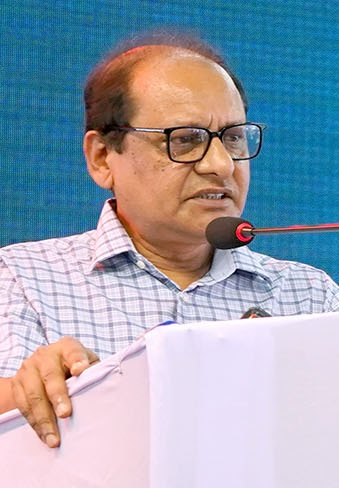
- Poddar in 2025

Adviser for Primary and Mass Education
- In office 11 August 2024 – 17 February 2026
- President: Mohammed Shahabuddin
- Chief Adviser: Muhammad Yunus
- Preceded by: Rumana Ali
- Succeeded by: A. N. M. Ehsanul Hoque Milan

Personal details
- Born: 1963 (age 62–63) Madhyanagar, Sunamganj, East Pakistan
- Party: Independent
- Education: Sir Salimullah Medical College; Dhaka College

Bidhan Ranjan Roy Poddar (Bengali: বিধান রঞ্জন রায় পোদ্দার; born 1963), also known by his pen-name Biranjan Roy (Bengali: বিরঞ্জন রায়), is a Bangladeshi psychiatrist, academic, writer, and government adviser. He was an adviser to the Interim government of Bangladesh.

== Early life ==
Poddar was born in 1963 to a Hindu family of Rai Poddars in Madhyanagar, Sunamganj subdivision, Sylhet district, East Pakistan. He is the eldest among the three sons of Dr. Gopi Ranjan Roy Poddar and Madhavilata Roy Poddar. His father provided free healthcare services to poor people in the Bangshikunda, Chamardani and Madhyanagar areas, and was called the Gariber Daktar or Doctor of the Poor. He was a leftist politician and a leader of the Kshetamajur Committee.

Poddar attended the Government Jubilee High School, Sunamganj, where he received his Secondary School Certificate in 1979, and completed his Higher Secondary Certificate from Dhaka College in 1981. He studied medicine at the Sir Salimullah Medical College in Dhaka, receiving his MBBS degree in 1988. He subsequently completed an MPhil in Psychiatry from the Institute of Postgraduate Medicine and Research (IPGMR), Dhaka, in 1993.

== Career ==
Poddar joined the Bangladesh Civil Service (Health Cadre) as an Assistant Surgeon in the 10th BCS batch in 1991. He served as Professor and Head of the Department of Psychiatry at Mymensingh Medical College Hospital, and maintained a private chamber at Mymensingh Union Specialized Hospital. He specialised in mental health, drug addiction, and sexual medicine. On 27 February 2020, he was appointed Director of the National Institute of Mental Health and Hospital (NIMH) in Dhaka. He retired from government service on 2 July 2023.

On 11 August 2024, Poddar and Supradip Chakma were sworn in as advisers to the interim government led by Muhammad Yunus. President Mohammed Shahabuddin administered their oaths at the Durbar Hall of Bangabhaban. The pair had been unable to attend the initial swearing-in ceremony on 8 August 2024 as they were outside Dhaka. The Cabinet Division assigned him to the Ministry of Primary and Mass Education on the same day. One of two members of the Hindu minority in the interim government, Poddar stated that he would promote communal harmony and inter-religious cooperation as part of his public role.

As adviser, Poddar oversaw several education reforms. He advocated for mother-tongue instruction for Bangladesh's linguistic minority communities, stating at a February 2025 event for International Mother Language Day that educating children in their native languages honours the spirit of the 1952 Language Movement. He also indicated that the government was considering reinstating a primary-level scholarship system that had lapsed under a prior curriculum reform. In January 2026, he announced that 100 percent of primary-level textbooks had been distributed to students on the first day of the school year. His tenure as adviser ended on 17 February 2026.

== Works ==
- Samajik Chetanar Manastwatta [The Psychology of Social Consciousness] (2016)
- Epicurus, Adhunikata O Amra [Epicurus, Modernity and Us] (2018)
- Shotoborshe Debiprasad [Debiprasad in His Centenary] (2020)
- Sigmund Freud O Afreudiya Freudbadigan [Sigmund Freud and the Un-Freudian Freudians] (2021)
