= Barun Roy =

Bangladeshi communist politician

- বরুণ রায়

Member of Parliament
- In office 1986–1988
- Preceded by: Syed Rafiqul Haque
- Succeeded by: Badruddoza Ahmed Shuja

Personal details
- Born: 10 November 1922 Beheli in Jamalganj Upazila of Sunamganj District, East Bengal, British Raj
- Died: 8 December 2009 (aged 87) Hasonnagar, Sunamganj District, Bangladesh
- Party: Communist Party of Bangladesh
- Occupation: Politician

Barun Roy, born Prasun Kanti Ray, (10 November 1922 – 8 December 2009) was a politician of the Communist Party of Bangladesh. He was born in Sunamganj District and was the member of Parliament from Sunamganj-1.

== Early life ==
Roy was born on 10 November 1922 in Beheli in Jamalganj Upazila of Sunamganj District, East Bengal, British Raj. He was born into a Zamindar family and his father was a member of the Assam Provincial Assembly. He graduated from Mogra High School in 1942. He completed his I.A. exams from Sunamganj College in 1947. He enrolled in Sylhet M. C. College in 1948 in a B.A. program. As a student he was involved with communist politics on campus.

== Career ==
Roy was arrested in 1949 for his involvement in the Language Movement in East Pakistan and was imprisoned for five years. In prison he met famous communist politicians, Moni Singh, Robi Dham, etc. In 1950 he was elected to the Sunamganj District Communist Party. In 1954 he was elected to the Provincial Assembly as a United Front candidate. Following the proclamation of martial law by President Ayub Khan, he was arrested again in 1958 and was kept in jail till 1963. He was elected to the post of General Secretary of the Communist Party in Sunamganj in 1966.

Roy was elected to the central committee of the Krishak Samiti and the Communist Party in 1968. During this period he remained in hiding from the police and helped organize protests against President Ayub Khan. He campaigned for the Communist Party candidate in the 1970 Pakistan general election. Following the start of the Bangladesh Liberation war in 1971, he moved to India and trained as a member of the Mukti Bahini. He helped organize training in the Mukti Bahini Balat camp in Meghalaya, India. He helped organize guerrilla forces composed of left wing political supporters to fight the Pakistan Army in the Bangladesh Liberation war.

Roy returned to Bangladesh on 17 December 1971 after Bangladesh was liberated on 16 December. He worked to organize the Communist Party throughout Bangladesh. He contested the 1973 Parliamentary election. He was involved with organizing union activities, helped organize the fishermen in marshlands in Bhasanpani' and 'Jal Zar Jala Tar' and organized landless peasants in the 'Langal Zar Jami Tar' movement. In 1980, he was arrested for trying to organize a union for bank employees. He was elected to Parliament in 1986 as a candidate of Communist Party of Bangladesh. He was arrested for protesting against the military government and in 1990 retired from politics. He worked with the Moni Singh-Farhad Memorial Trust after retirement.

== Death ==
Roy died 8 December 2009 in Hasonnagar, Sunamganj District, Bangladesh.
