= Jamalganj Upazila =

Jamalganj জামালগঞ্জ
- Upazila
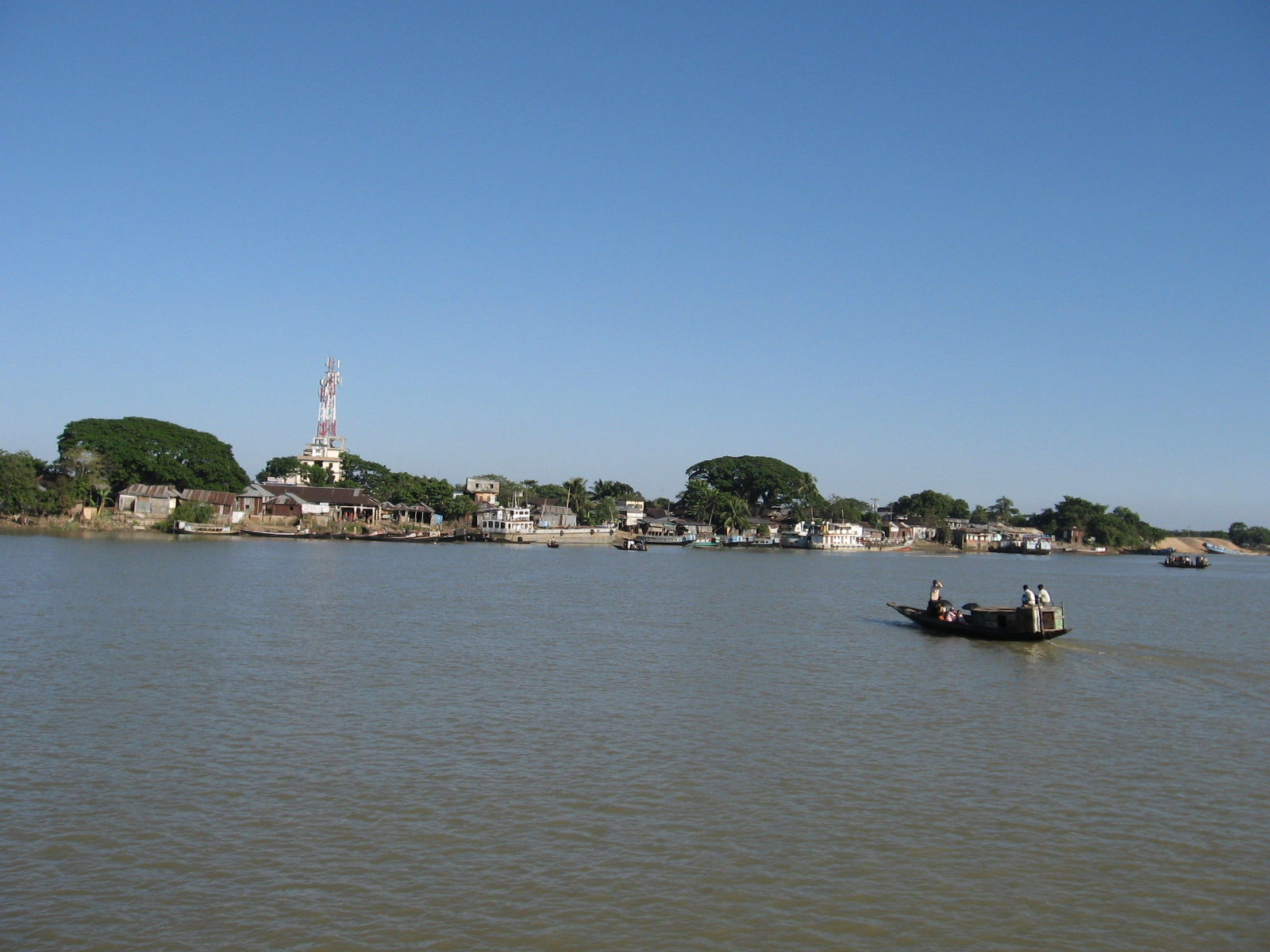
- Jamalganj upazila, as seen from Surma river

- Country: Bangladesh
- Division: Sylhet
- District: Sunamganj

Area
  - Total: 309.38 km^{2} (119.45 sq mi)

Population (2022)
  - Total: 185,866
  - Density: 600.77/km^{2} (1,556.0/sq mi)
- Time zone: UTC+6 (BST)
- Postal code: 3020
- Website: jamalganj.sunamganj.gov.bd

Jamalganj (Bengali: জামালগঞ্জ) is an upazila of Sunamganj District in the division of Sylhet, Bangladesh.

Jamalganj Upazila mauza geocode map

== Etymology ==
According to the information provided by Zamindar Ekhlasur Rahman Chowdhury of Bhatipara in 1964, it comes from his ancestor Zamindar Jamal Faruqi. The two talukas of Jamalgarh and Jamalpur were named in memory of Jamal Faruqi after being purchased by the Bhatipara zamindars. Then when a new market competing with Sachna Bazar was established on the west bank of the river, it was named as Jamalganj (Marketplace of Jamal).

== Geography ==
Jamalganj is located at 24.9833°N 91.2333°E. It has 29,935 households and total area 309.38 km^{2}. Jamalganj Upazila is bounded by Tahirpur and Bishwamvarpur upazilas on the north, Khaliajuri and Derai upazilas on the south, Sunamganj Sadar Upazila on the east, Mohanganj, Dharmapasha and Madhyanagar upazilas on the west. Main rivers are Nawa Gang, Baulai and Dhanu; Pakna Haor and Hail Haor are also notable. Patilachura, Pangna, Lamba, Baska, Chhatidhara and Kachma beels are noted.

== Demographics ==
Religions in Jamalganj Upazila (2022)
Religion	Percent
Islam	85.55%
Hinduism	14.44%
Other or not stated	0.01%

According to the 2022 Bangladeshi census, Jamalganj Upazila had 36,015 households and a population of 185,866. 12.41% of the population were under 5 years of age. Jamalganj had a literacy rate (age 7 and over) of 58.56%: 59.72% for males and 57.43% for females, and a sex ratio of 98.70 males for every 100 females. 18,560 (9.99%) lived in urban areas.

According to the 2011 Census of Bangladesh, Jamalganj Upazila had 29,935 households and a population of 167,260. 51,398 (30.73%) were under 10 years of age. Jamalganj had a literacy rate (age 7 and over) of 32.46%, compared to the national average of 51.8%, and a sex ratio of 977 females per 1000 males. 10,133 (6.06%) lived in urban areas.

As of the 1991 Bangladesh census, Jamalganj has a population of 107,771. Males constitute 51.75% of the population, and females 48.25%. This upazila's eighteen up population is 53158. Jamalganj has an average literacy rate of 20.1% (7+ years), and the national average of 32.4% literate.

== Economy ==
The people of Jamalganj upazila live mainly on the basis of agricultural economy. There are many haors and rivers in Jamalganj. Many people make a living by fishing from open haors, especially during the rainy season. Besides, government revenue also comes from rivers, canals and beels. The Surma River flows along the middle of Jamalganj.

== Administration ==
Jamalganj thana was established in 1940 and was turned into an upazila in 1984.

Jamalganj Upazila is divided into five union parishads: Beheli, Bhimkhali, Fenerbak, Jamalganj, and Sachnabazar. The union parishads are subdivided into 97 mauzas and 192 villages.

The town of Jamalganj consists of 2 mouzas. It has an area of 5.81 km^{2}..

=== Chairmen ===
Chairman's of Jamalganj Upazila Parishad
Serial No.	Name	Term of Office
1	Alhaj Abul Mansur Ahmed Talukdar (Lal Mia)	1985-1990
2	Yousuf Al Azad	1990-1991
3	Yousuf Al Azad	2009-2014
4	Alhaj Samsul Alam Talukdar (Jhunu Miah)	2014-2019
5	Yousuf Al Azad	2019-2020
6	Iqbal Al Azad	2020-2024
7	Rejaul Karim Shamim	2024-

=== (UNO) Upazila Nirbahi Officers ===
UNO's of Jamalganj Upazila
Serial No.	Name	Term of office
1	Md. Nuruzzaman Khan	11/04/1983-12/06/1983
2	A.K.M. Kadam Ali	13/06/1983-19/06/1983
3	Dewan Abdur Rouf	20/07/1983-16/09/1985
4	S. Said-ur-Rahman	17/09/1985-24/01/1987
5	Fazle Kabir	25/01/1987-10/04/1987
6	Upendra Nath Sarkar	11/04/1987-18/10/1989
7	Md. Sirajul Islam Sheikh	18/10/1989-10/08/1994
8	Md. Mizanul Ul Alam	11/08/1994-28/09/1994
9	M. A. Bashar Sarkar	29/09/1994-01/04/1999
10	Kazi Md. Anwarul Hakim	08/04/1999-08/08/2001
11	Md. Kamruzzaman Chy	13/08/2001-18/03/2002
12	Shah Mohammad Nasim	19/03/2002-12/04/2004
13	Shankar Prashad Shen	12/04/2004-26/01/2006
14	Md. Jahangir Alam	27/01/2006-25/06/2006
15	Jahangir Kabir	25/06/2006-23/11/2006
16	Jakaria	24/11/2006-01/12/2006
17	Ashraf Uddin	02/12/2006-25/06/2007
18	Jakaria	26/06/2007-28/07/2007
19	Anjan Chandra Paul	29/07/2007-01/04/2009
20	Md. Dewan Humayun Kabir	10/04/2009-16/05/2009
21	Hayat Ud Doula	17/05/2009-30/08/2010
22	Md. Lutfur Rahman	31/08/2010-26/09/2010
23	Md. Abul Hashem	27/09/2010-24/07/2011
24	Md. Khoybar Rahman	24/07/2011-12/02/2012
25	Md. Shamsul Haque	13/02/2012-01/04/2012
26	Md. Mashhudul Kabir	01/04/2012-18/03/2013
27	Md. Shamsul Haque	19/03/2013-28/03/2013
28	S. M. Shafi Kamal	28/03/2013-05/11/2015
29	Titan Khisha	06/11/2015-20/10/2016
30	Taslima Ahmed Poly	20/10/2016-17/11/2016
31	Tania Sultana	17/11/2016-29/12/2016
32	Prashun Kumar Chakrabarti	29/12/2016-03/08/2017
33	Monirul Hasan	03/07/2017-26/09/2017
34	Shamim Al Imran	26/09/2017-31/03/2019
35	Priyanka Paul	31/03/2019 to 2020

== Education ==
=== Colleges ===
- Jamalganj Govt. College, Jamalganj

=== Secondary schools ===
Secondary Schools of Jamalganj Upazila
Serial No.	Name	Established
1	Jamalganj Govt Model High School	1 January 1950
2	Jamalganj Girls' High School	1981
3	Sachna Bazar High School	22 January 1989
4	Beheli High School	24 January 1993
5	Abdul Mukit High School	14 August 1999
6	Nabin Chandra High School	1 January 1970
7	Alauddin Memorial High School	1967
8	Bhimkhali High School	1 January 1958

|9 |Al-haj Jhunu Mia High School |1 January 2010

== See also ==
- Districts of Bangladesh
- Sub-Districts of Bangladesh
- Divisions of Bangladesh
- Unions of Bangladesh
