= Ranjit Chandra Sarkar =

Bangladeshi politician

Member of the Bangladesh Parliament for Sunamganj-1
- In office 30 January 2024 – 6 August 2024
- Preceded by: Moazzem Hossain Ratan
- Succeeded by: Kamruzzaman Kamrul

Personal details
- Born: 30 January 1973 (age 53)
- Party: Bangladesh Awami League

Ranjit Chandra Sarkar (born 30 January 1973) is a Bangladesh Awami League politician and a former Jatiya Sangsad member representing the Sunamganj-1 constituency in 2024.

== Career ==
Sarkar was the organizing secretary of the Sylhet District unit of the Awami League. He was elected to parliament from Sunamganj-1 as an Awami League candidate on 7 January 2024. He defeated the previous member of parliament, Moazzem Hossain Ratan, who contested as an independent candidate. He lost his position as a Member of Parliament in 2024 following the dissolution of the National Parliament through the Non-cooperation movement and the fall of the Sheikh Hasina led Awami League government. After the resignation of Prime Minister Sheikh Hasina, his residence in the Gopal Tila area of Sylhet was attacked and vandalised by a group of people, alongside the homes of several other Awami League leaders in the city.

Sarkar attended a protest against professor Muhammad Yunus, head of the interim government of Bangladesh, in London in June 2025 along with fellow former member of parliament Md Abu Zahir.

In November 2026, Sarkar home was vandalized and set on fire. He accused activists of the Bangladesh Nationalist Party of being responsible for the attack. On the same day, the home of the Sylhet District president of the Bangladesh Chhatra League was also attacked. The attacks took place after Sarkar attended a rally in Sylhet District allegedly following his return to Bangladesh through India. On 10 November 2026, Inspector General of Bangladesh Police Md. Ali Hossain Fakir directed police officials to increase border surveillance in coordination with the Border Guard Bangladesh following reports that Sarkar had recently entered Bangladesh from India and held a meeting with local Awami League leaders.
