= Syed Rafiqul Haque =

Bangladeshi politician

Syed Rafiqul Haque Sohel
- সৈয়দ রফিকুল হক
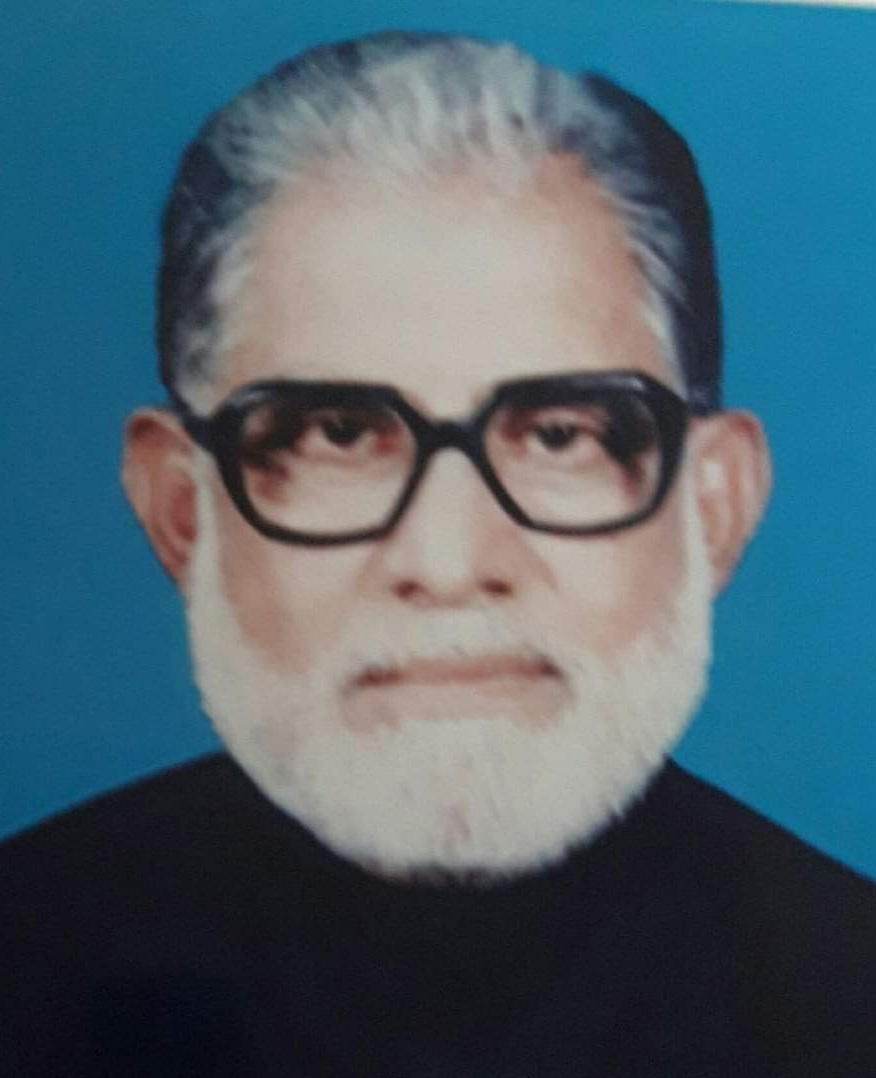

Member of Parliament from Sylhet-1 (now Sunamganj-1)
- In office 1979–1986
- Preceded by: Abdul Hakeem Chowdhury
- Succeeded by: Prasun Kalin Roy

Member of Parliament from Sunamganj-1
- In office June 1996 – 1991
- Preceded by: Nozir Hossain
- Succeeded by: Nozir Hossain

Personal details
- Born: Sunamganj, Bangladesh
- Party: Awami League
- Other political affiliations: People's Democratic Party, Bangladesh Nationalist Party

Syed Rafiqul Haque Sohel is a politician in Sunamganj District of Sylhet Division of Bangladesh. He was elected a member of the parliament from the Sylhet-1 (now Sunamganj-1) as a Bangladesh Nationalist Party candidate in 1979 and was elected a member of the parliament from the Sunamganj-1 as a candidate of Bangladesh Awami League in the June 1996 parliamentary election.

== Birth and early life ==
Syed Rafiqul Haque Sohel was born in Sunamganj District of Sylhet Division of Bangladesh.

== Political life ==
He stood as a People's Democratic Party (PDP) candidate in the 1970 Pakistani general election. He was elected to parliament from Sylhet-1 (now Sunamganj-1) as a Bangladesh Nationalist Party candidate in 1979. and elected a member of the parliament from the Sunamganj-1 as a candidate of Bangladesh Awami League in the June 1996 parliamentary election.
