= Badruddoza Ahmed Shuja =

Bangladeshi politician

Badruddoza Ahmad Shuja
- বদরুদ্দোজা আহমেদ সুজা

Member of the Bangladesh Parliament for Sunamganj-1
- In office 1988–1991
- Preceded by: Prasun Kalin Roy
- Succeeded by: Nozir Hossain

Personal details
- Born: Sunamganj, Bangladesh
- Party: Jatiya Party (Ershad); Bangladesh Muslim League (current)

Badruddoza Ahmed Shuja is a Bangladeshi politician. He was elected a member of the 1988 fourth Jatiya Sangsad from Sunamganj-1 for the Jatiya Party.

== Birth and early life ==
Badruddoza Ahmed Shuja was born in the Sunamganj District in the Sylhet Division. His father is Abdul Khalek, then parliamentary secretary of the National Assembly of Pakistan.

== Political life ==
Badruddoza Ahmed Shuja is the president of Bangladesh Muslim League. He was elected a member of the fourth Jatiya Sangsad from Sunamganj-1 for the Jatiya Party. He was defeated by participating in the Jatiya Sangsad elections of 1991, 2001 and 2018.
