= Madhyanagar Upazila =

Madhyanagar মধ্যনগর
- Upazila
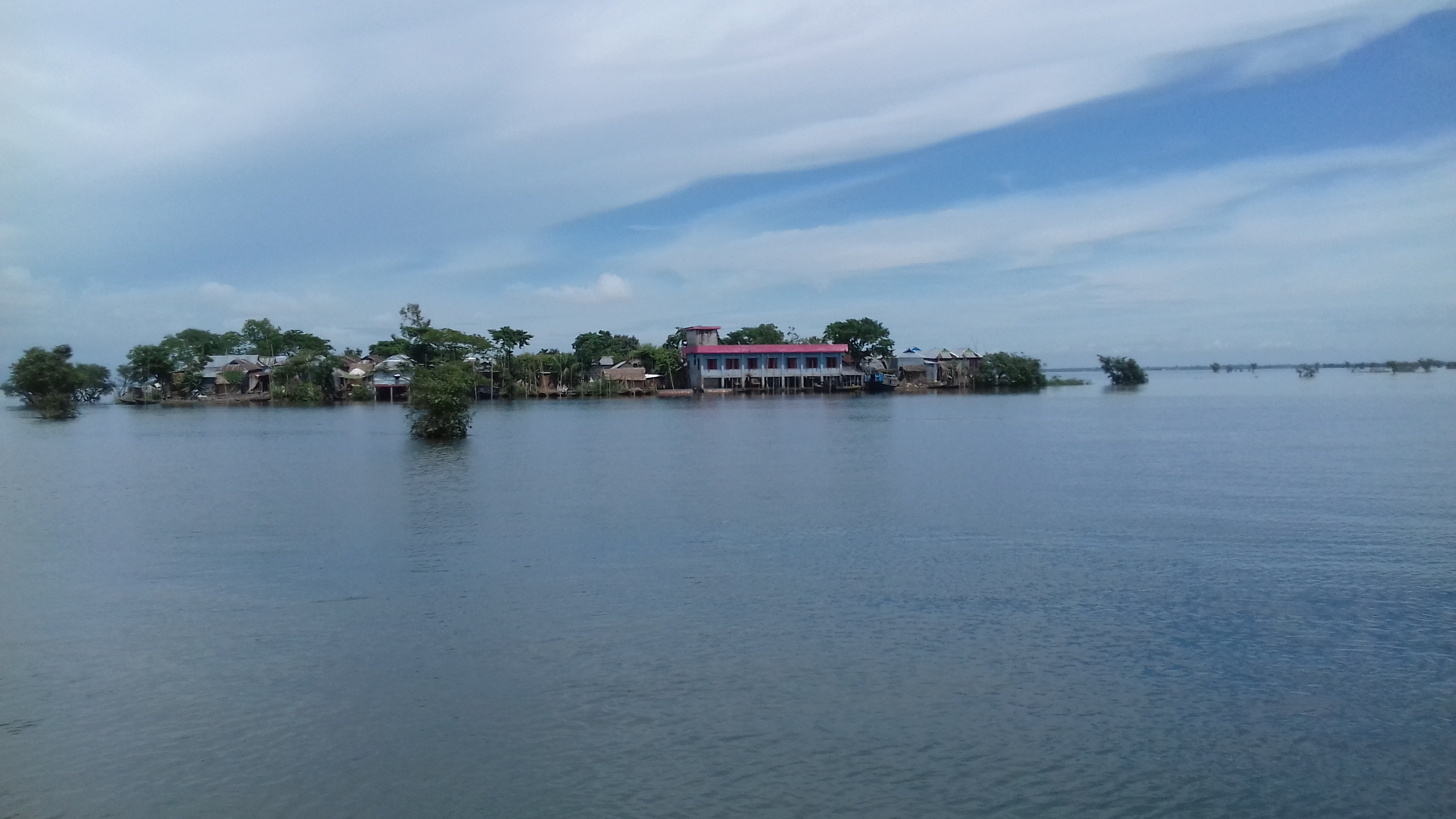
- Haor in Madhyanagar Upazila

- Country: Bangladesh
- Division: Sylhet
- District: Sunamganj

Government
  - MP (Sunamganj-1): Vacant (ad interim)

Area
  - Total: 221.00 km^{2} (85.33 sq mi)

Population (2022)
  - Total: 96,237
  - Density: 435.46/km^{2} (1,127.8/sq mi)
- Time zone: UTC+6 (BST)
- Postal code: 2456

Madhyanagar (Bengali: মধ্যনগর উপজেলা) is an upazila in Sunamganj district in Bangladesh About 1.5 lakh people live in 4 unions of the upazila. The second largest haor of Bangladesh, the third Ramsar area is located at Banshikunda of Brihaur in Madhyanagar upazila of Tanguar haor.

== Geography ==
Madhyanagar is bordered by the Meghalaya, India on the north, Dharmapasha Upazila on the south, Jamalganj and Tahirpur upazilas on the east and Kalmakanda Upazila on the west.

== History ==
Madhyanagar Thana was formed in 1984 with Madhyanagar Union, Chamardani Union, Banshikunda North Union and Banshikunda South Union. The distance from Banshikunda North Union to Upazila Sadar is more than 40 kilometers, on the other hand the distance from Upazila Sadar to Madhyanagar is 20 kilometers. As a result, people were suffering to get education, medical and administrative services.

Initially, activities were started from mid-1986 to upgrade Madhyanagar Thana to an upazila. After this, programs like hunger strike, human chain and hartal were also observed in Madhyanagar market at different times. At the 7th meeting of the National Implementation Committee on Administrative Restructuring (NICAR) in 2001, it was decided to establish Madhyanagar Upazila with 4 unions in Madhyanagar Thana area. The decision was later overturned at the 7th Nikar meeting. The last decision to make Madhyanagar a full-fledged upazila was taken at the 116th meeting of Nikar on 28 July 2021.

== Demographics ==
Religions in Madhyanagar Upazila (2022)
| Religion | Percent |
| Islam | 76.81% |
| Hinduism | 22.07% |
| Christianity | 1.02% |
| Other or not stated | 0.10% |

According to the 2022 Bangladeshi census, Madhyanagar Upazila had 21,174 households and a population of 96,237. 10.73% of the population were under 5 years of age. Madhyanagar had a literacy rate (age 7 and over) of 57.70%: 59.10% for males and 56.30% for females, and a sex ratio of 100.98 males for every 100 females. 9,450 (9.82%) lived in urban areas. Ethnic population was 2581 (2.68%) of which Hudi were 1109 and Garo were 907.

Ethnic groups in Madhyanagar Upazila (2022)
1. Bengali (97.3%)
2. Hudi (1.15%)
3. Garo (0.94%)
4. Others (0.59%)

According to the 2011 Census of Bangladesh, the unions now part of Madhyanagar Upazila had 18,613 households and a population of 92,745. 28,129 (30.33%) were under 10 years of age. Madhyanagar had a literacy rate (age 7 and over) of 28.22%, compared to the national average of 51.8%, and a sex ratio of 989 females per 1000 males. 3,945 (4.25%) lived in urban areas. Ethnic population was 2,468 (2.66%).

== Administration ==
Administrative activities of 4 unions are under Madhyanagar upazila.

- Banshikunda Uttar Union
- Banshikunda Dakkhin Union
- Chamradani Union
- Madhyanagar Union

== Economy ==
The amount of agricultural land in this upazila is 15,600 hectares.

== See also ==
- Upazilas of Bangladesh
- Districts of Bangladesh
- Divisions of Bangladesh
