= Moazzem Hossain Ratan =

Bangladeshi politician

- মোয়াজ্জেম হোসেন রতন

Member of the Bangladesh Parliament for Sunamganj-1
- In office 25 January 2009 – 7 January 2007
- Preceded by: Nozir Hossain
- Succeeded by: Ranjit Chandra Sarkar

Personal details
- Born: 13 June 1972 (age 53) Sunamganj, Sylhet District, Bangladesh
- Party: Bangladesh Awami League

Moazzem Hossain Ratan (born 13 June 1972) is a Bangladesh Awami League politician and the former Jatiya Sangsad member representing the Sunamganj-1 constituency.

== Early life ==
Moazzem Hossain Ratan was born on 13 June 1972 in the village of Nowdhar in Dharmapasha Thana, Sunamganj Mahakuma, Sylhet District, Bangladesh. His brother, Muzzammil Hossain Rukn, is the chairman of Dharmapasha Upazila. He completed his undergraduate education in engineering.

== Career ==
Ratan was elected to parliament in 2008 and 2014 from Sunamganj-1 as a Bangladesh Awami League candidate. In 2008, while campaigning for the election, he was attacked and his car was vandalized by Bangladesh Awami League activists. He is a member of the Parliamentary Standing Committee on Posts and Telecommunications ministry.

On 30 September 2019, ACC started an investigation against Moazzem Hossain Ratan for illegally acquiring assets in a casino scandal in Dhaka. As his name appeared in the media of Bangladesh, the ACC decided to search the assets of at least 100 people including Ratan. The five-member search team was led by director Syed Iqbal Hossain. Later, on the recommendation of the search team, Ratan was banned from going abroad.

On 26 November 2023, Awami League announced the final list of its 298 candidates to contest the 2024 national election which did not include Ratan. He stood in the election as an independent candidate against the Awami League nominated Ranjit Chandra Sarkar and another independent candidate Salim Ahmad. The Election commission lodged a complaint against him over an attack on the Awami League office in Dharmapasha upazila. He lost the election to Ranjit Chandra Sarkar.
