= Abdul Hakeem Chowdhury =

Bangladesh politician

- আব্দুল হেকিম চৌধুরী

Member of the Bangladesh Parliament for Sylhet-1
- In office 1973–1975
- Preceded by: Start (gain independence)
- Succeeded by: Syed Rafiqul Haque

Personal details
- Born: 1 May 1924 Sunamganj, Bengal Province, British India
- Died: 28 March 1986 (aged 61) Dhaka Medical College and Hospital
- Party: Awami League

Abdul Hakeem Chowdhury (March 1924 – 28 March 1986) was a politician in Bangladesh who was a member of the East Pakistan Provincial Council and member of parliament.

== Birth and family life ==
Abdul Hakeem Chowdhury was born on 1 March 1924 in Dharmapasha union of Sunamganj Mohukumar of the then British Presidency of British India. His father's name is Abdur Rahman Chowdhury. His children are Rafiqul Hasan Chowdhury (eldest son) and Fakhrul Islam Chowdhury.

== Political life ==
Abdul Hakeem Chowdhury was a devoted colleague of Bangabandhu Sheikh Mujibur Rahman in political life. He was the president of the Sunamganj District Student Federation and regional commander of the Muslim League National Guard Dharmapasha police station in 1948. Sunamganj Mukuuma was the vice-president of the Awami League in 1953 and co-ordinator in his own constituency in the United Front election in 1954. He played an active role in the 1952 language movement. In 1962, Dharmapasha served as the chairman of the Union Council and a member of the former East Pakistan Provincial Legislature, and in 1963, the president of the Sunamganj Mohukuma Awami League and secretary of the then East Pakistan Awami League parliamentary party. He was elected a councilor of the then All Pakistan Awami League in that 1970 year. In 1970, he won the provincial council and won. He was elected to parliament from Sylhet-1 (now Sunamganj-1) as a Bangladesh Awami League candidate in 1973.

== Death ==
Abdul Hakeem Chowdhury died on 24 March 1986 while undergoing treatment at Dhaka Medical College Hospital. Later, he was buried in the Jama Masjid premises of Dharmapasha village.

== See also ==
- 1973 Bangladeshi general election
