= Dharmapasha Upazila =

Dharmapasha ধর্মপাশা
- Upazila
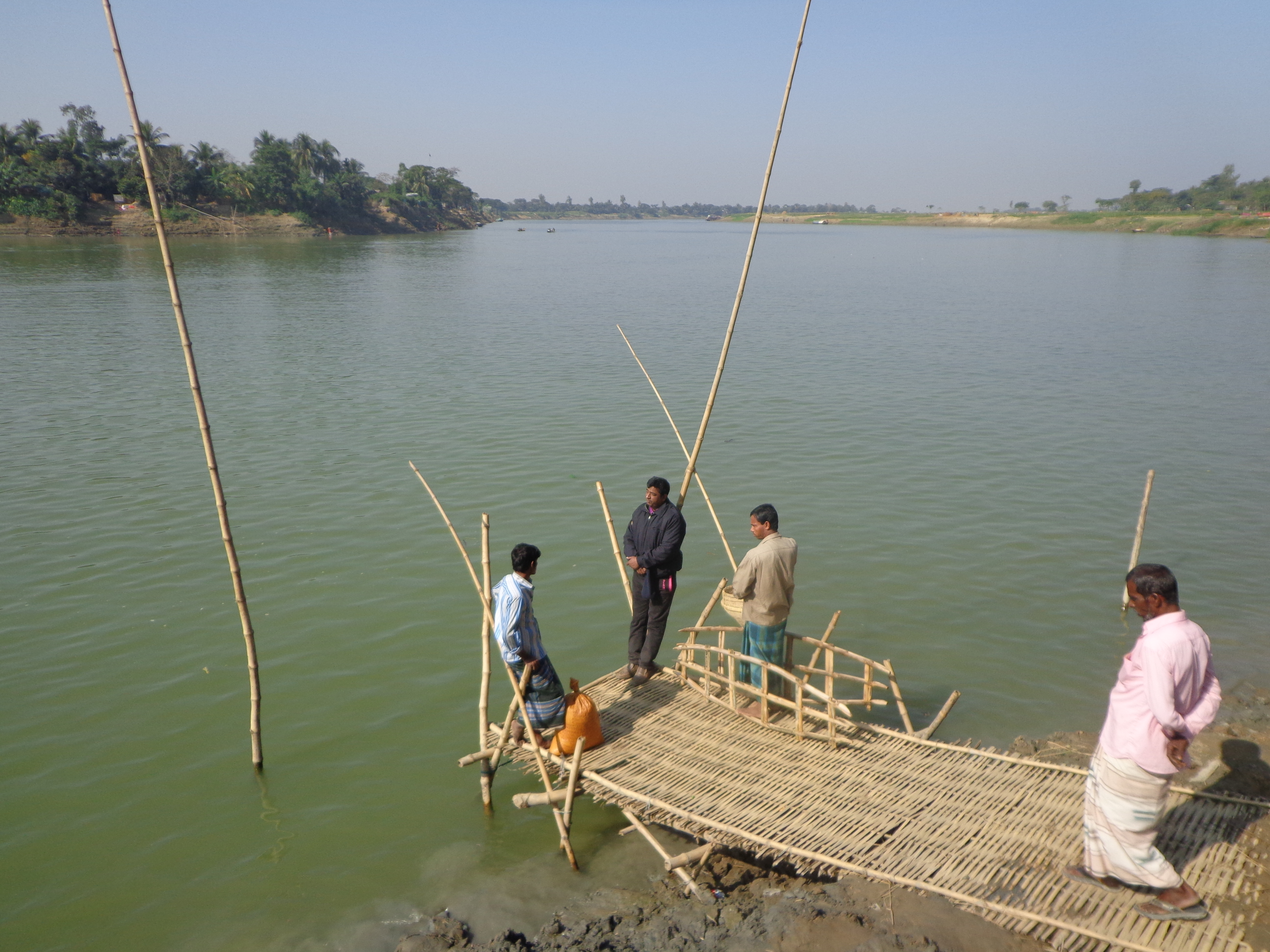
- Baulai River at Dharmapasha

- Country: Bangladesh
- Division: Sylhet
- District: Sunamganj

Government
  - Upazila Chairman: Vacant (ad interim)

Area
  - Total: 310.00 km^{2} (119.69 sq mi)

Population (2022)
  - Total: 133,250
  - Density: 429.84/km^{2} (1,113.3/sq mi)
- Demonym: Dharamapashi Dhorompashi Dharampashi
- Time zone: UTC+6 (BST)
- Postal code: 2450
- Area code: 08725
- Website: dharmapasha.sunamganj.gov.bd

Dharmapasha (Bengali: ধর্মপাশা, romanized: Dhormopasha, also spelled as Dharampasha or Dharamapasha, is an upazila of Sunamganj District in the Division of Sylhet, Bangladesh.

Dharmapasha Upazila mauza geocode map

== Geography ==
Dharamapasha is located at 24.9000°N 91.0167°E. It has 25,305 households and total area 310.00 km^{2}. It is located on the banks of the Kangsha River, close to the haor areas. Tānguār Hāor, the largest haor of Bangladesh, lies between the upazilas of Dharmapasha and Tahirpur. Other haors, rivers and beels in Dharmapasha include Surma River, Tagār Hāor, Dhārām Hāor, Ghāglājur River, Sārdā Bil, Kaimer Dair, Dhānkuniyā Hāor, Sonāmaral Hāor, Rāuwār Bil, Shiyāldighā Bil, Pākertalā Bil, Phirāgāng Bil, Dharani Bil, Jāldharā Bil, Sanuā Hāor, Pashwa River, Chhātidharā River, Rāklā River, Baulāi River, Chepta River, Nowanadi River and Helainna River.

The neighbouring upazilas are Mohanganj, Barhatta, Kalmakanda, Jamalganj and Tahirpur.

== History ==
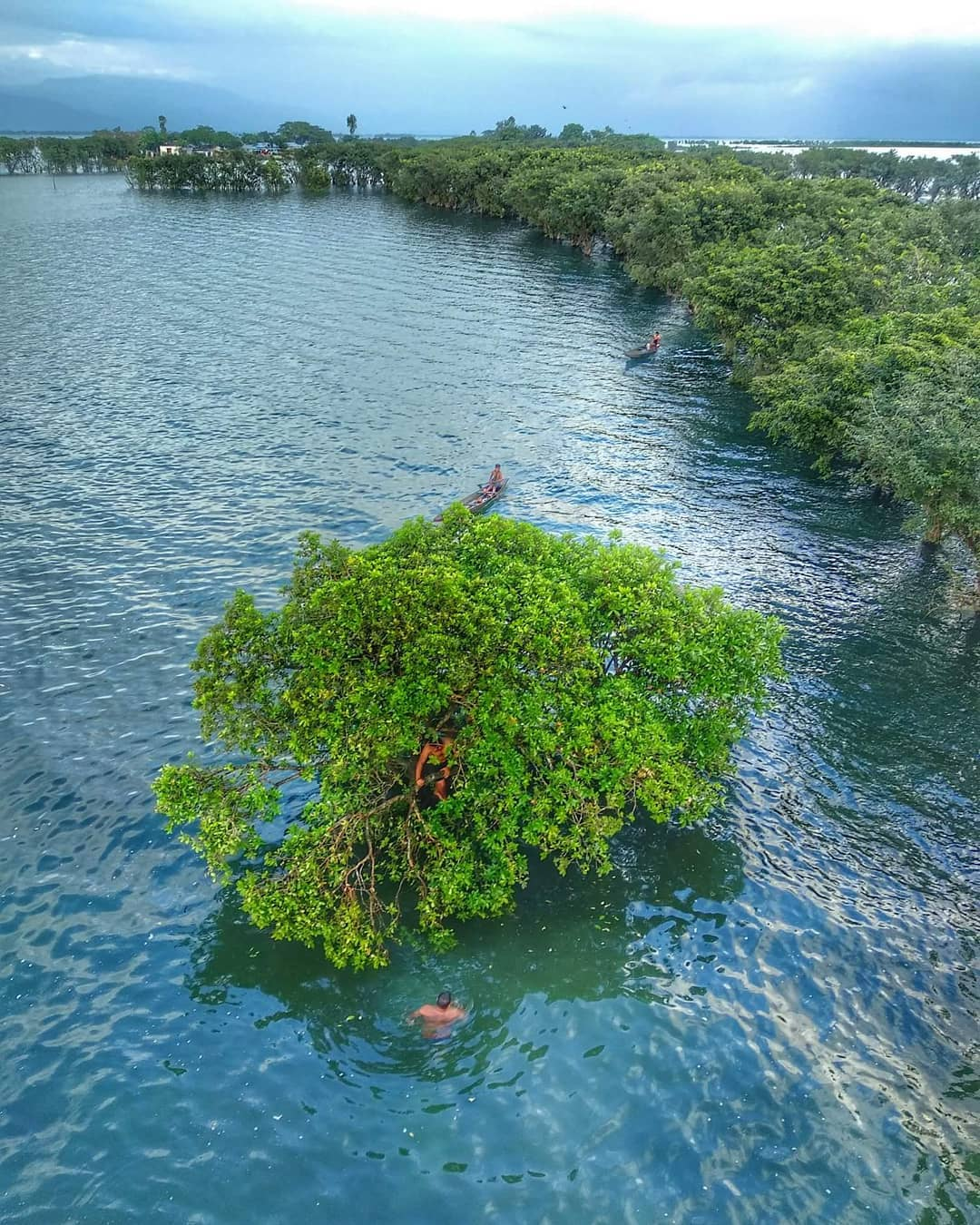
Tanguar haor.

During the reign of the Mughal emperor Aurangzeb in around 1691, Mahamanikya Datta of Hooghly set off for Assam. On his journey, he passed by the Kalidaha lowlands and was astonished by its natural beauty. As a result, he purchased a jagir in Sukhair in present-day Dharmapasha. In 1695, Zamindar Mohanlal had a large palace built within the Sukhair jagir, and they had authority over 20 wetlands. An English officer visited the Tanguar haor for tiger hunting during the zamindari of Maiyuk Chaudhuri. The English officer was captured by three tigers, and when news of this reached the Zamindar, he broke the law by shooting the tigers to free him. Chaudhuri was later awarded a gun for his services. The reason for the change of surname from Datta to Rai-Chaudhuri is explained by Malay Rai Chaudhuri to be due to the fact that one of his ancestors married a Das when arriving to Sukhair. Mahamanikya Dutta's fourth descendant Pratap Rai-Chaudhuri embraced Islam and married a woman from an upper-class Muslim family in nearby Rajapur. He inherited half of Sukhair's zamindari, and later became the Zamindar of Rajapur.

In 1787, the Khasis of Laur rebelled against the British East India Company by plundering many of their parganas (including modern-day Dharmapasha Upazila's Bangsikunda, Ramdigha, and Selbaras) and killing up to 800 people. The British collector of Sylhet, Robert Lindsay, sent troops to the area but before they could arrive, the Khasis had retreated back to their mountains.

Muhammad Akhtar Chowdhury Tota Mia (b. 1840s), the zamindar of Selbarash, was renowned for his bravery. In the early 20th century, the deputy commissioner of Sylhet described the zamindars of Selbarash as among the most prominent landholders of greater Sylhet. Narrative folk ballads, known as pala gan, about Tota Mia's heroism gained prominence. These ballads are preserved in Badiuzzaman's Momenshahi Geetika published by Bangla Academy.

On 12 June 1897, the area was heavily affected during an earthquake which resulted in many deaths. Between 1922 and 1923, Sukhair became a prominent area of the Nankar Rebellion. Ghulam Jilani Choudhury of the Selbaras zamindar family married Ashrafunnesa Choudhurani in the 1930s. Their son, Ahmad Taufiq Choudhury, joined the Ahmadiyya movement where he became the regional leader of Khuddam-ul Ahmadiyya, and later migrated to Mymensingh where he became the Ameer of Ahmadiyya Muslim Jamaat Bangladesh after independence.

In 1942, a thana was established at Dharmapasha. 50 people died of smallpox in one night at the village of Bishara in 1967. In 1983, Dharmapasha Thana was upgraded to an upazila (sub-district) as part of the President of Bangladesh Hussain Muhammad Ershad's decentralisation programme. Three years later, a second thana was founded in Dharmapasha Upazila called Madhyanagar Thana. On 26 July 2021, Khandker Anwarul Islam announced the establishment of Madhyanagar Upazila, which effectively reduced the Dharmapasha Upazila.

== Demographics ==
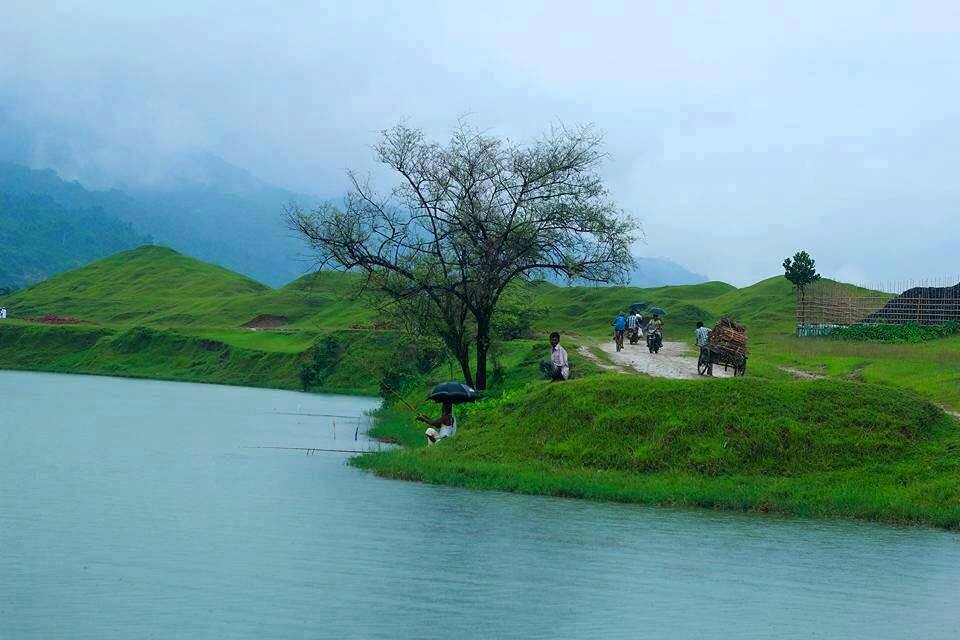
Tanguar haor and Jadukata River.

Religions in Dharmapasha Upazila (2022)
Religion	Percent
Islam	91.48%
Hinduism	8.50%
Other or not stated	0.02%

According to the 2022 Bangladeshi census, Dharmapasha Upazila had 28,210 households and a population of 133,250. 11.24% of the population were under 5 years of age. Dharmapasha had a literacy rate (age 7 and over) of 56.66%: 57.39% for males and 55.93% for females, and a sex ratio of 98.87 males for every 100 females. 17,809 (13.37%) lived in urban areas.

According to the 2011 Census of Bangladesh, the residual Dharmapasha Upazila had 25,305 households and a population of 130,457. 39,626 (30.37%) were under 10 years of age. Dharmapasha had a literacy rate (age 7 and over) of 29.83%, compared to the national average of 51.8%, and a sex ratio of 992 females per 1000 males. 7,858 (6.02%) lived in urban areas.

As of the 1991 Bangladesh census, Dharamapasha has a population of 164131. Males constitute 51.41% of the population, and females 48.59%. This Upazila's eighteen up population is 80347. Dharamapasha has an average literacy rate of 20.8% (7+ years), and the national average of 32.4% literate.

== Economy ==
Dharamapasha has 14 famous market places, mostly famous for agricultural products, domestic animals, sand, and stones.

== Administration ==
Dharamapasha Upazila is divided into ten union parishads: South Sukair-Rajapur, Dharmapasha, Joysree, Paikurati, Selbarash, and North Sukair-Rajapur. The union parishads are subdivided into 174 mauzas and 324 villages.

There are 18 post offices, One Govt. Hospital, One Health Center, One Sub-Health Center and Twenty two community clinics in Dharmapasha Upazila.

=== Upazila chairmen ===
List of chairmen
Name	Notes
Misbah ad-Duja Ahmad Reza
Abd al-Awwal	4/5/2009
Muhammad Abd al-Mutalib Khan	27/4/2014-24/5/2014
Muzzammil Hussain Rukn

== Education ==
- Gulokpur Hazee Abdul Hafez High School.
- Dharamapasha Janata High School (oldest one, Former Khoda-Box Public High school )
- Dharamapasha Girls School
- Dharamapasha Degree College
- Dharamapasha Model Primary School
- Badshaganj Govt. High School
- Badshaganj Public Girls High School.
- Badshaganj Degree College
- Khoda-Box Public High school
- Joysree High School, Joysree
- Modhyanagar B.P. High School and College
- Bongshikonda Momin High School
- Moheskhola High School
- Camardani High School

Primary

- Patkura Govt. Primary School
- Rouha Govt. primary School
- Mewhary Govt.primary School
- Kandhapara Govt.primary School
- Camardani Govt.primary School.
- Syedpur Govt.primary School.
- Ahmedpur Govt.primary School.
- Singpur Govt.primary School.
- Khoyerdirchar Govt.primary School.
- Mudahorpur Govt primary School.
- Batakpur Reg; primary School.
- Barpachur Reg; primary School.
- Nalgora Reg; primary School.
- Selbarash Govt. primary School.

== Facilities ==
Dharmapasha Upazila is home to 192 mosques, most notably the historic Selbaras Jame Mosque.

== Notable people ==
- Abdul Hakeem Chowdhury, former Member of Parliament
- Moazzem Hossain Ratan, politician
- Nirmalendu Chowdhury, musician

== See also ==
- Upazilas of Bangladesh
- Districts of Bangladesh
- Divisions of Bangladesh
