= Sunamganj Science and Technology University =

Bangladeshi public university

- সুনামগঞ্জ বিজ্ঞান ও প্রযুক্তি বিশ্ববিদ্যালয়
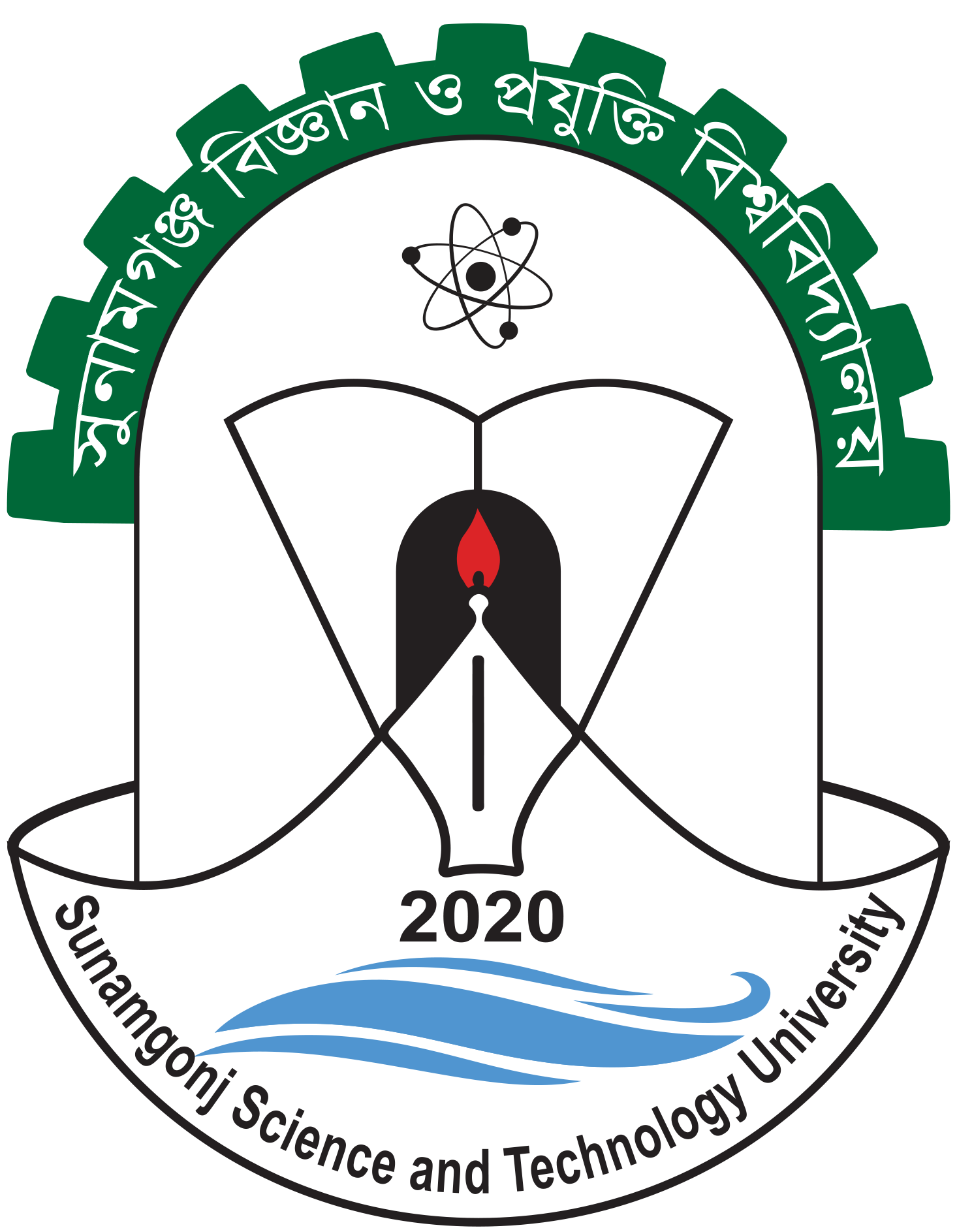
- Logo of Sunamganj Science and Technology University
- Type: Public
- Established: 2020; 6 years ago
- Affiliations: University Grants Commission
- Chancellor: President Mirza Fakhrul Islam Alamgir
- Vice-Chancellor: Md. Abu Naim Sheikh
- Academic staff: 17
- Students: 160
- Location: Sunamganj, Bangladesh

Sunamganj Science and Technology University (SSTU) is a public university in Bangladesh. It was established in 2020 and located in Sunamganj district.

== List of vice-chancellors ==
- Professor Md. Abu Naim Sheikh (2022 - 2024)
- Professor Dr. Nizam Uddin (2024 - 2026)
- Professor Dr. Zakir Hussain (2026 - present)
