= Phani Bhoushon Choudhury =

Fani Bhushan Chowdhury

Member, Bangladesh Public Service Commission
- In office 2014–2016

Secretary, Ministry of Textiles and Jute
- In office 2013–2014
- Preceded by: Ashraful Maqbul
- Succeeded by: Farid Uddin Ahmed Chowdhury

Police Coordinator (IGP), Ministry of Home Affairs
- In office 2010–2013

Personal details
- Born: November 11, 1954 Chhatak, Sunamganj, Bangladesh
- Died: 26 March 2016 (aged 61) Dhaka, Bangladesh
- Education: Chittagong University; Dhaka University
- Occupation: Police Officer, Secretary

Phani Bhushan Chowdhury was a Bangladeshi police officer, chief of the Criminal Investigation Department, and member of the Bangladesh Public Service Commission. He was a secretary of the government of Bangladesh.

== Early life ==
Chowdhury was born on 11 November 1954 in Chhatak Upazila, Sunamganj District. He graduated from the University of Chittagong in 1975 with a bachelor's in physics. He completed a law degree in 1984 from the University of Dhaka.

== Career ==
Chowdhury joined the Bangladesh Civil Service in 1981 and joined the Bangladesh Police as a cadet in 1982. In 1988, he was appointed an assistant superintendent of Bangladesh police.

Chowdhury was the special superintendent of the Criminal Investigation Department in 2001. During the Bangladesh Nationalist Party rule from 2001 to 2006, he was denied promotion multiple times. The Bangladesh Nationalist Party government didn't promote and provide good postings to Hindu officers like Chowdhury, and officers from Faridpur District and Gopalganj District as they were perceived as being loyal to the opposition Awami League. Phani was promoted to deputy inspector general and posted to the Police Training Centre, Khulna.

In 2007, Chowdhury was the chief of the Criminal Investigation Department. He led the Criminal Investigation Department's investigation of the 2004 Dhaka grenade attack and found involvement of Harkat-ul-Jihad-al-Islami Bangladesh.

In 2010, Chowdhury joined the Ministry of Home Affairs as the police coordinator. The government considered appointing coordinator of the investigative team of the International Crimes Tribunal.

Chowdhury was made the secretary of the Ministry of Textiles and Jute in 2013. He retired on 10 November 2014. He joined the Bangladesh Public Service Commission on 24 November 2014.

== Death ==
Chowdhury died on 26 March 2016 at the Dhaka Medical College and Hospital, Bangladesh from cancer.
