= Poddar =

Indian surname

Poddar, Podar or Podder (lit. 'treasurer') is an Indian surname. Notable people with the surname include:

- Abhishek Poddar (born 1968), Indian industrialist, philanthropist and art collector
- Ajay Poddar, Indian-American engineer
- Ajay Kumar Poddar, Indian politician from the Bharatiya Janata Party, member of the West Bengal Legislative Assembly
- Aparupa Poddar (born 1986), Indian politician, member of Lok Sabha from Arambagh, West Bengal
- Anupam Poddar, Indian businessman, owner of Sirpur Paper Mills
- Ayushi Podder (born 2000), Indian sport shooter
- Bidhan Ranjan Roy Poddar, Bangladeshi minister
- Bimla Poddar (1936–2025), Indian social worker
- Garima Poddar, Indian chef
- Giriraj Poddar, Indian industrialist and politician, member of Madhya Pradesh Legislative Assembly
- Govinda Poddar (born 1991), Indian cricketer
- Hanuman Prasad Poddar (1892–1971), Indian independence activist, littérateur, magazine editor and philanthropist
- Joygopal Podder (born 1960), Indian writer
- Lekha Poddar, Indian businesswoman, mother of Anupam Poddar
- Mahesh Poddar, Indian industrialist and politician, member of Rajya Sabha from Jharkhand
- Prakash Poddar (1940–2022), Indian first-class cricketer for Bengal and Rajasthan
- Prosenjit Poddar, Indian student involved in Tarasoff v. Regents of the University of California
- Rajendra Kumar Poddar, Indian politician, member of Rajya Sabha from Bihar
- Ramendra Kumar Podder (born 1930), Indian chemist
- Samir Kumar Poddar, Indian politician, member of the West Bengal Legislative Assembly
- Sunil Kumar Podder (1937–2023), Indian molecular biologist and biophysicist

== See also ==
- Podar (disambiguation)
- Poddar Family, fictional family in the Indian TV series Badii Devrani
- Poddar Nagar, neighbourhood in South Kolkata, Kolkata, West Bengal, India
- B. P. Poddar Institute of Management & Technology, college in Kolkata, West Bengal, India
- Podar Group of Schools, Mumbai, Maharashtra, India
  - Podar International School
  - Lilavatibai Podar High School
  - R. A. Podar Institute of Management
  - R. N. Podar School
  - Ramniranjan Anandilal Podar College of Commerce and Economics
- Seth Gyaniram Bansidhar Podar College, Rajasthan, India
