= Tanguar Haor =

Wetland ecosystem in Bangladesh

- Noykuri Kandar Choykuri Beel
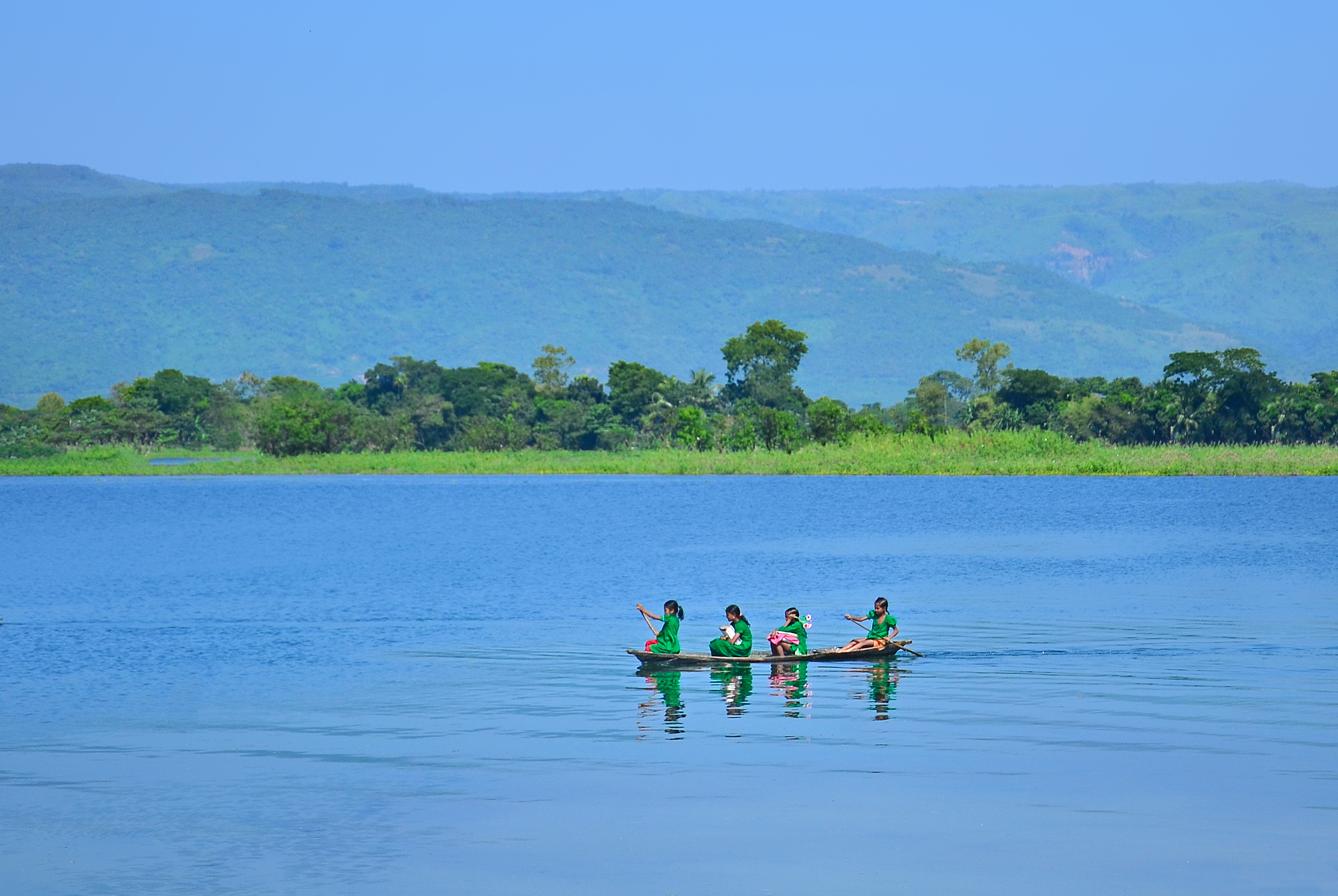
- School girls paddling a low-freeboard boat in the haor
- Interactive map of Tanguar Haor
- Location: Sunamganj
- Coordinates: 25°09′N 91°04′E
- Type: Haor
- Basin countries: Bangladesh
- Designation: Mother of Fisheries; Mother of All Haors
- Water volume: 12,655 hectares (31,271.19 acres)

Designations

Ramsar Wetland
- Official name: Tanguar Haor
- Designated: June 10, 2000
- Reference no.: 1031

Tanguar Haor (Bengali: টাঙ্গুয়ার হাওর) is a wetland ecosystem located in the Dharmapasha and Tahirpur upazilas of Sunamganj District in Bangladesh. The area of Tanguar Haor including 46 villages within the haor is about 100 square kilometres (39 sq mi) of which 2,802.36 ha^{2} is wetland. It is the source of livelihood for more than 40,000 people. Bangladesh declared it an Ecologically Critical Area in 1999, considering its critical condition as a result of overexploitation of its natural resources.

== Flora and fauna ==
Every winter the haor is home to about 200 types of migratory birds. In 1999–2000, the government earned 7,073,184 takas as revenue just from fisheries of the haor. There are more than 140 species of freshwater fish in the haor. The more predominant among them are: ayir, Cat fish, baim, tara, gutum, gulsha, tengra, titna, garia, beti, kakia. Gulli, balua, ban tulsi, nalkhagra and other freshwater wetland trees are in this haor.

Plant species like Hizol (Barringtonia acutangula), Clematis cadmia, Crataeva nurvala, Euryale ferox, Nelumbo nucifera, Ottelia alismoides, Oxystelma secamone var. secamone, Pongamia pinnata, Rosa clinophylla, and Typha species are present.

== Tourism ==
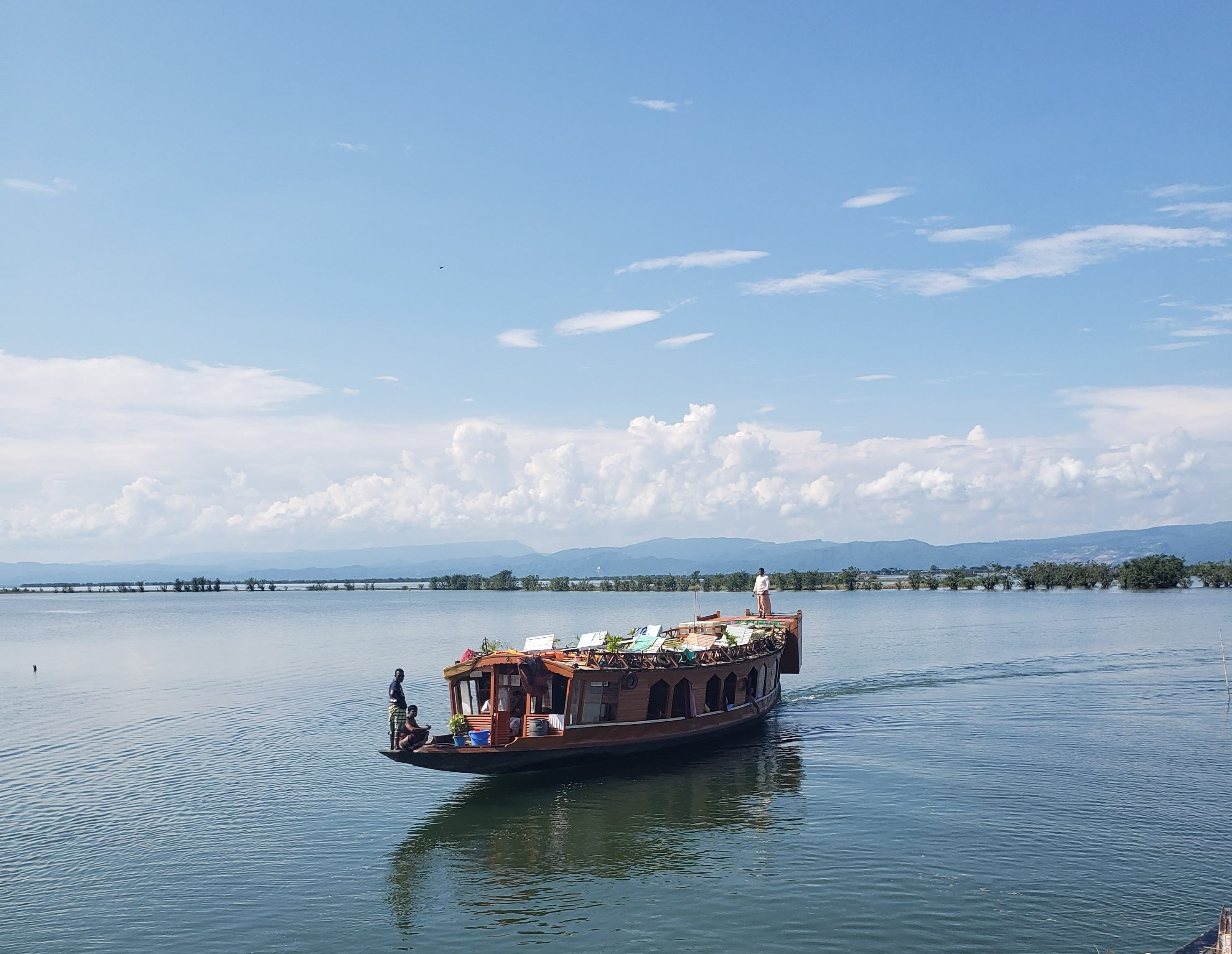
A tourist houseboat in Tanguar Haor

It has become more popular as a tourist attraction due to the number of houseboats plying at Tanguar Haor. There is a big houseboat in Tanguar Haor. It is a huge, slow-moving barge used for leisure trips. This service is inspired from the houseboat Rabindranath Tagore used during his visit to Shilaidaha. It has been in service from since 2021. It is about 71 feet (22 m) long and about 14 feet (4.3 m) wide at the middle.

== Gallery ==
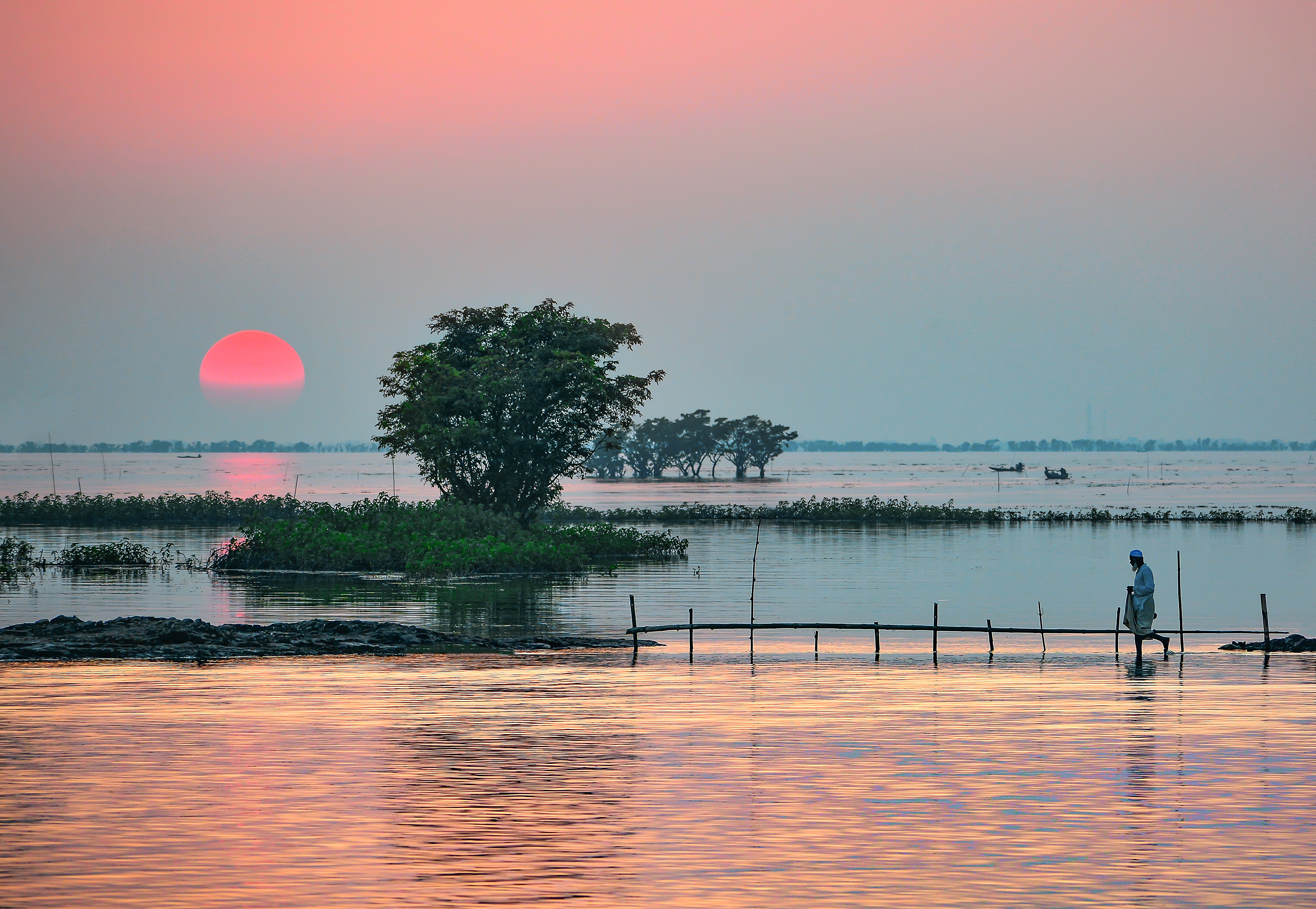
Sunset in Tanguar Haor

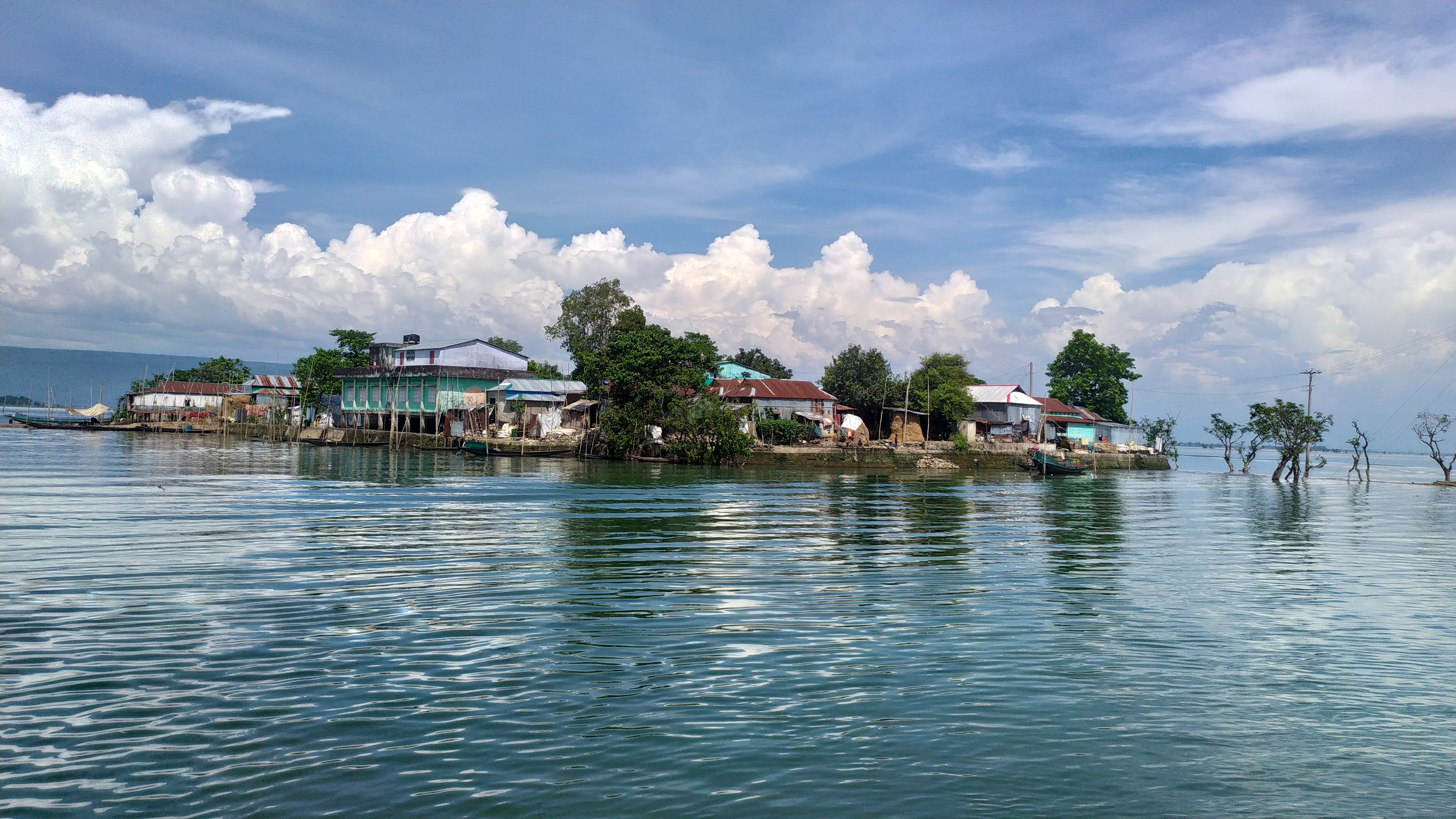
A small village in Tanguar Haor

A bird's eye view of the tourist-designated area of Tanguar Haor

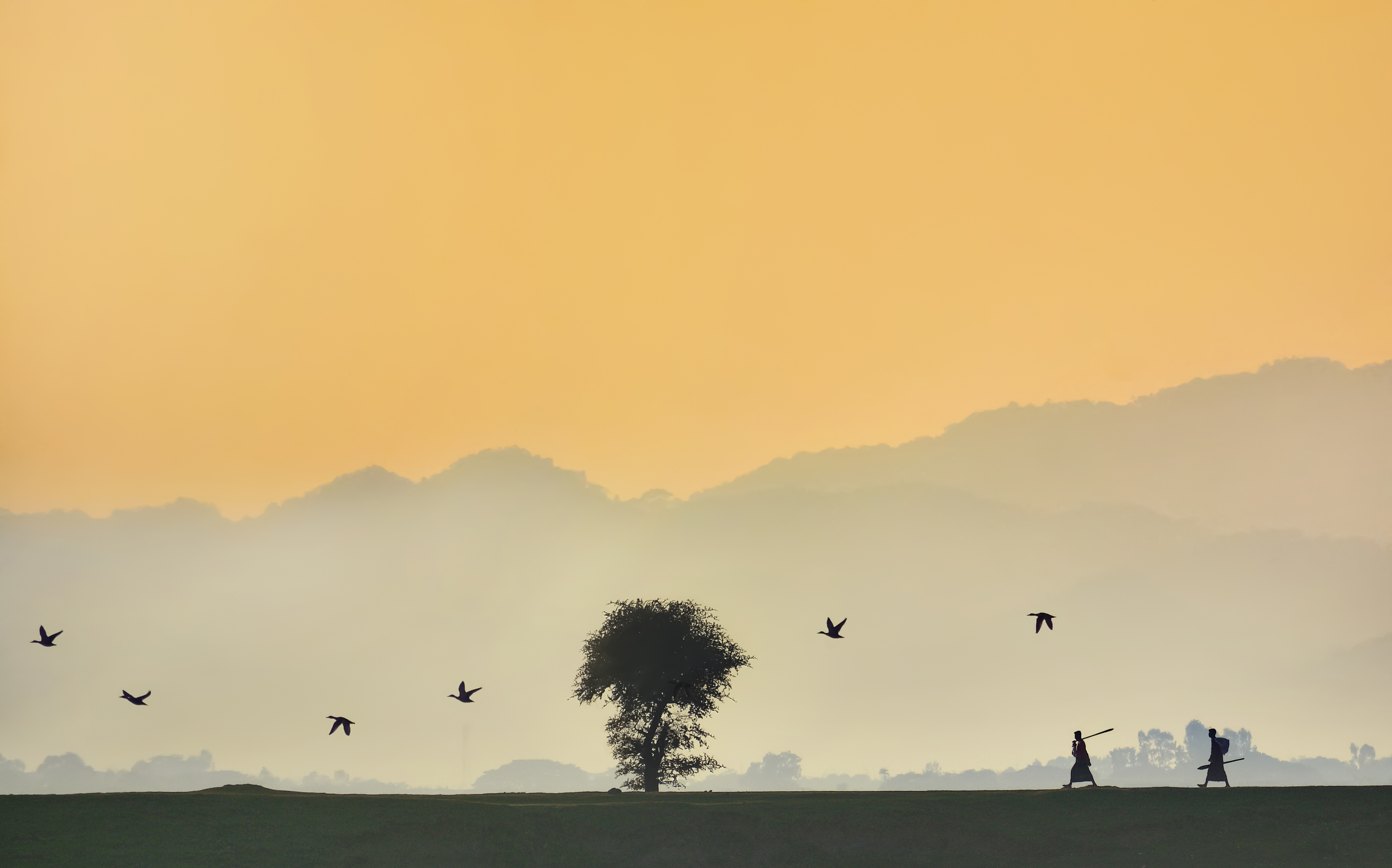
Mountains of Meghalaya seen from Tanguar Haor

== See also ==
- Shimul Garden
