= Bishwamvarpur Upazila =

Bishwamvarpur বিশ্বম্ভরপুর
- Upazila
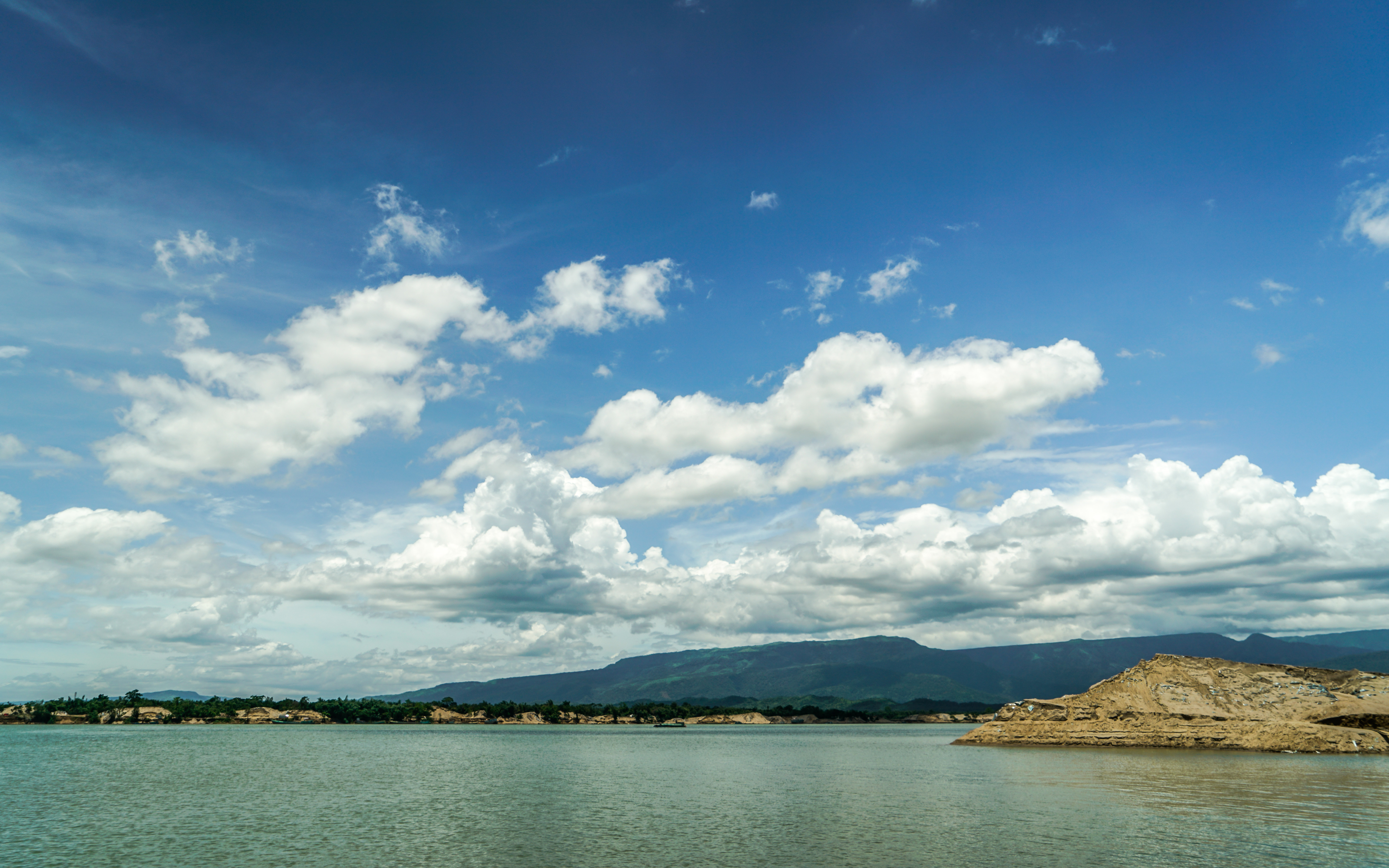
- Chalti River at Bishwamvarpur upazila

- Country: Bangladesh
- Division: Sylhet
- District: Sunamganj

Government
  - MP (Sunamganj-4): Vacant (ad interim)

Area
  - Total: 248.63 km^{2} (96.00 sq mi)

Population (2022)
  - Total: 190,350
  - Density: 765.60/km^{2} (1,982.9/sq mi)
- Demonym(s): Bishwamvarpuri, Bishomborpuri
- Time zone: UTC+6 (BST)
- Postal code: 3010

Bishwamvarpur (Bengali: বিশ্বম্ভরপুর, or Bishwambarpur, is an upazila of Sunamganj District in the Division of Sylhet, Bangladesh.

== Geography ==
Bishwamvarpur is located at 25.1000°N 91.3000°E. It has 29,336 households and total area 248.63 km^{2}.

== Demographics ==
Religions in Bishwamvarpur Upazila (2022)
Religion	Percent
Islam	90.01%
Hinduism	9.97%
Other or not stated	0.02%

According to the 2022 Bangladeshi census, Bishwambharpur Upazila had 37,815 households and a population of 190,350. 12.91% of the population were under 5 years of age. Bishwambharpur had a literacy rate (age 7 and over) of 64.17%: 64.50% for males and 63.84% for females, and a sex ratio of 98.93 males for every 100 females. 16,626 (8.73%) lived in urban areas.

According to the 2011 Census of Bangladesh, Bishwamvarpur Upazila had 29,336 households and a population of 156,381. 51,669 (33.04%) were under 10 years of age. Bishwamvarpur had a literacy rate (age 7 and over) of 34.57%, compared to the national average of 51.8%, and a sex ratio of 1000 females per 1000 males. 3,156 (2.02%) lived in urban areas.

As of the 1991 Bangladesh census, Bishwamvarpur has a population of 106182. Males constitute 50.96% of the population, and females 49.04%. This Upazila's eighteen up population is 52628. Bishwamvarpur has an average literacy rate of 17.2% (7+ years), and the national average of 32.4% literate. Religions: Muslim 80.3%, Hindu 19.5%, and others 0.2%.

== Administration ==
Bishwamvarpur Upazila is divided into five union parishads: Dakshin Badaghat, Dhanpur, Fatepur, Palash, and Solukabad. The union parishads are subdivided into 61 mauzas and 184 villages.

== See also ==
- Upazilas of Bangladesh
- Districts of Bangladesh
- Divisions of Bangladesh
