= Hassan Shahriar =

Bangladeshi journalist (1946–2021)

- Born: 25 April 1946; Sunamganj, Sylhet Division, Bengal Presidency, British India
- Died: 10 April 2021 (aged 74)

Hassan Shahriar (25 April 1946 – 10 April 2021) was a Bangladeshi journalist, columnist, and political analyst.

== Early life and career ==
Shahriar was born on 25 April 1946 at Sunamganj, a district of Greater Sylhet region.

Shahriar served The Daily Ittefaq as its executive editor. He was the first editor of the Daily Sun and Chief Editor of Chittagong-based Daily People's View. He was Bangladesh correspondent of international news magazine Newsweek, Khaleej Times of Dubai, India's Daily Deccan Herald, The Indian Express and The Asian Age, Pakistan's Morning News, Dawn and Evening Star.

Before the 1971 independence of Bangladesh, he worked as a staff reporter in Karachi, Pakistan.

He was awarded the prestigious Harry Brittan Fellowship by the Commonwealth Press Union (CPU) in 1978. The five-month course included training on advance journalism, attachment to British newspaper Telegraph and Argus of Bradford and Oxford University's Elizabeth House.

Shahriar, who was known as a South Asian affairs analyst, wrote an innumerable number of in-depth and analytical reports on the politics of India, Pakistan, Nepal and Sri Lanka. He interviewed personalities including Indian Prime Ministers Indira Gandhi, P. V. Narasimha Rao, and Chandra Sekhar; Kashmiri leader Sheikh Abdullah; Pakistani leaders Zulfiqar Ali Bhutto, Ziaul Haq, Benazir Bhutto and Nawaz Sharif; Cambodian leader Prince Norodom Sihanouk, Japanese Prime Minister Toshiki Kaifu, Nobel laureate Mother Teresa and cricketer Imran Khan.

Shahriar was the International President Emeritus of the Toronto-based Commonwealth Journalists Association (CJA). He was the first journalist from Asia-Pacific to be elected as president of this organization in 2003. He was re-elected in 2008 and retired in 2012. He served as the vice-president of CJA from 1997 to 2003. He was also elected President of Bangladesh's National Press Club, the Overseas Correspondents Association Bangladesh (OCAB) and the South Asia Press Club Association (SAPCA) and the Commonwealth Journalists Association Bangladesh chapter.

Shahriar covered many national and international events, and attended seminars at home and abroad. He represented Bangladesh at many forums, including the United Nations General Assembly (UNGA) and the OIC Foreign Ministers' Conference at Sana'a, Yemen.

He was also a part-time instructor of Press Institute of Bangladesh (PIB), News Network feature agency, Management and Resources Development Initiative (MRDI), Dhaka, Society for Environment and Human Development (SHED), Dhaka, Nari Sangbadik Kendra (Women's Journalists' Centre) and many other organizations.

He was a question setter and examiner of the Dhaka University Journalism and Mass Communications Department.

Shahriar died from COVID-19 in 2021>

== Works ==
Shahriar authored three books:

- Ateet Ateet Noi (Past is not past), a compilation of his columns,
- Newsweeke Bangladesh: Muktijuddha, Bijoy abong Tarpar (Bangladesh in Newsweek: War of Liberation, Victory and Beyond), his reports in Newsweek magazine
- Shesh Bhalo Jar Shob Bhalo Tar (All's well that ends well), compilation of articles published in different Bengali newspapers.
