= Tahirpur Upazila =

Tahirpur তাহিরপুর
- Upazila
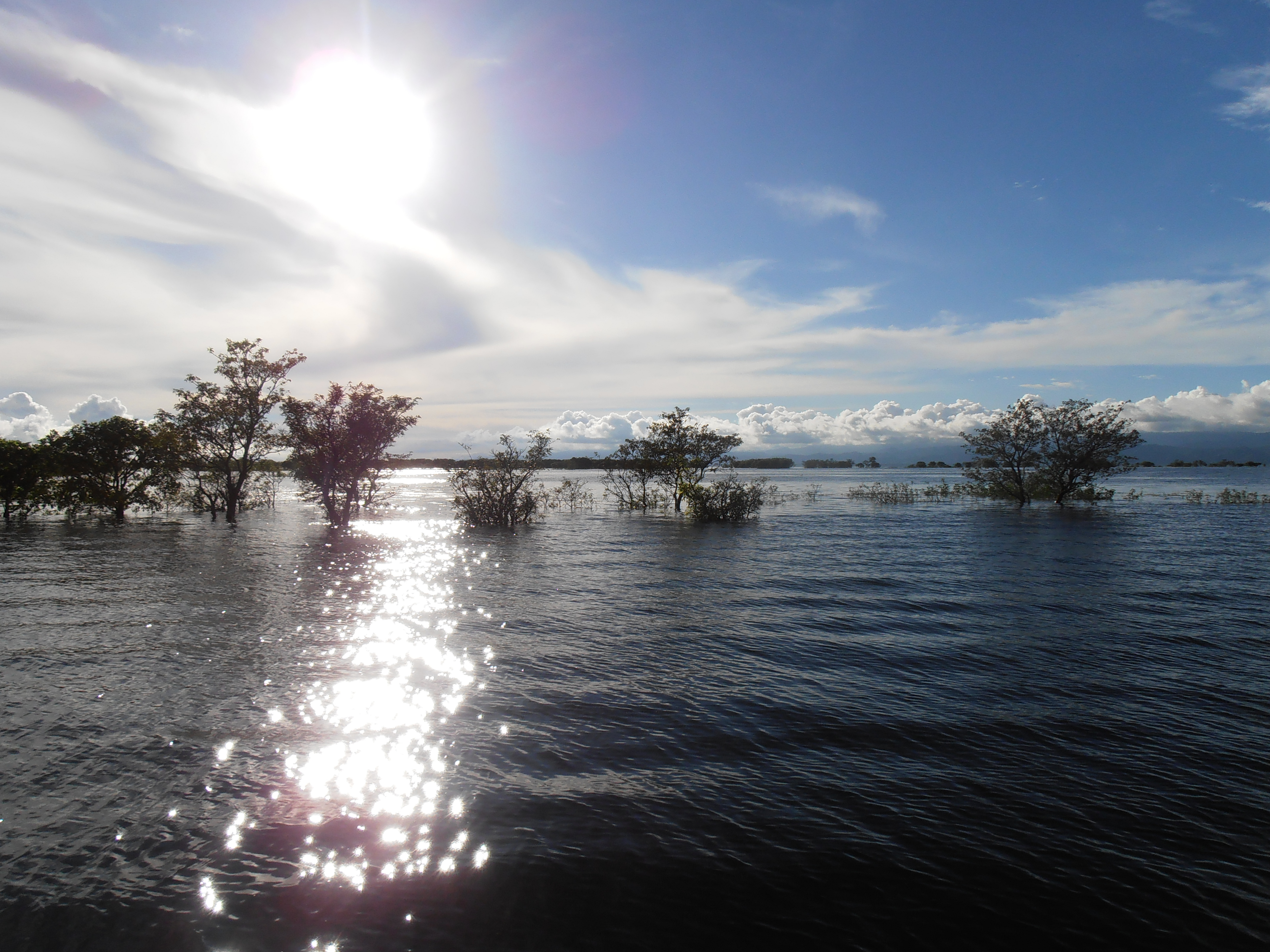
- View of Tanguar Haor

- Country: Bangladesh
- Division: Sylhet
- District: Sunamganj

Government
  - MP (Sunamganj-1): Vacant (ad interim)

Area
  - Total: 315.33 km^{2} (121.75 sq mi)

Population (2022)
  - Total: 224,853
  - Density: 713.07/km^{2} (1,846.8/sq mi)
- Time zone: UTC+6 (BST)
- Postal code: 3030
- Area code: 08732

Tahirpur Upazila mauza geocode map

Tahirpur (Bengali: তাহিরপুর) is an upazila of Sunamganj District in the Division of Sylhet, Bangladesh.

== Geography ==
Tahirpur is located at 25.0917°N 91.1750°E. It has 42,693 households and total area 315.33 km^{2}.

== History ==
The territory of Tahirpur Upazila contains the historic village of Nabagram (in Badaghat Union), which served as the capital of the Laur Kingdom. After the Conquest of Sylhet in 1303, some disciples of warrior-saint Shah Jalal migrated and settled in present-day Tahirpur where they preached Islam to the local people. Most notably, Shah Rafiuddin migrated here and is buried in Sarping on the border with Meghalaya on top of Laur Hill. In the 18th century, Tahirpur became a part of Brajendra Kishore Roy Chowdhury's zamindari based in Gouripur House in Mymensingh. For most of its history, the lower caste Hindus formed the majority of the area's population. During the British Raj, the local council resolved a false accusation against a Bengali Muslim by the name of Tahir Ali. Following this, Tahir Ali settled in this area, renaming it to Tahirpur. Tahirpur was established as a thana in 1924.

During the Bangladesh Liberation War of 1971, a refugee camp was established in Tahirpur on the footsteps of the Khasi and Jaintia Hills. 10 farmers were killed and several arrested during the Bhasan-Pani Movement between 1997 and 1998.

== Demographics ==
Religions in Tahirpur Upazila (2022)
Religion	Percent
Islam	93.48%
Hinduism	6.22%
Other or not stated	0.30%

According to the 2022 Bangladeshi census, Tahirpur Upazila had 43,543 households and a population of 224,853. 13.11% of the population were under 5 years of age. Tahirpur had a literacy rate (age 7 and over) of 60.71%: 61.96% for males and 59.44% for females, and a sex ratio of 101.88 males for every 100 females. 26,854 (11.94%) lived in urban areas.

According to the 2011 Census of Bangladesh, Tahirpur Upazila had 37,931 households and a population of 215,200. 73,148 (33.99%) were under 10 years of age. Tahirpur had a literacy rate (age 7 and over) of 30.40%, compared to the national average of 51.8%, and a sex ratio of 947 females per 1000 males. 9,450 (4.39%) lived in urban areas. Ethnic population was 1,951 (0.91%).

As of the 1991 Bangladesh census, Tahirpur has a population of 155188. Males constitute 51.67% of the population, and females 48.33%. This Upazila's population is 64325. Tahirpur has an average literacy rate of 31.2% (7+ years), and the national average of 30.4% literate.

== Administration ==
Tahirpur has 7 Unions/Wards, 136 Mauzas/Mahallas, and 244 villages. Its unions are North Baradal, Badaghat, North Sripur, Tahirpur Sadar, South Baradal, South Sripur and Balijuri.

== Economy ==
As the saying goes, fish-stone-paddy is the lifeblood of Sunamganj. And one of the suppliers of this fish-stone-paddy is Tahirpur upazila. So, these are one of the sources of economy of this upazila. Boro paddy in Haor in particular is the main source. And after that there are haor fish. Lots of fish are also caught in the river. The sand of Fazilpur of Tahirpur upazila is famous in the country and it is the only limestone mine in the country. In a word, Tahirpur Upazila is famous for its fish, rocks, sand and paddy. Poor people make a living by fishing in rivers, extracting rocks, extracting sand or working in paddy fields. Although agriculture is the main occupation, there is a lot of interest in trade and commerce lately. Basically, due to the real fearlessness of paddy cultivation, the fate of the people of this upazila fluctuates even in the face of water scarcity.

== Education ==
The progress of Tahirpur Upazila in the field of education is very low. There are two colleges in this upazila. A government high school. There are only two girls' high schools. There are also various primary schools, madrasas and other educational systems.

== Notable people ==
- Advaita Acharya (1434-1559), Hindu religious leader
- Maqbul Hossain Choudhury (1898-1957), activist and politician
- Shahed Ali (1925-2001), educationist and activist
- Hassan Shahriar (1946-2021), political analyst and columnist

== See also ==
- Upazilas of Bangladesh
- Districts of Bangladesh
- Divisions of Bangladesh
