= Sunamganj =

Sunamganj সুনামগঞ্জ
- Town
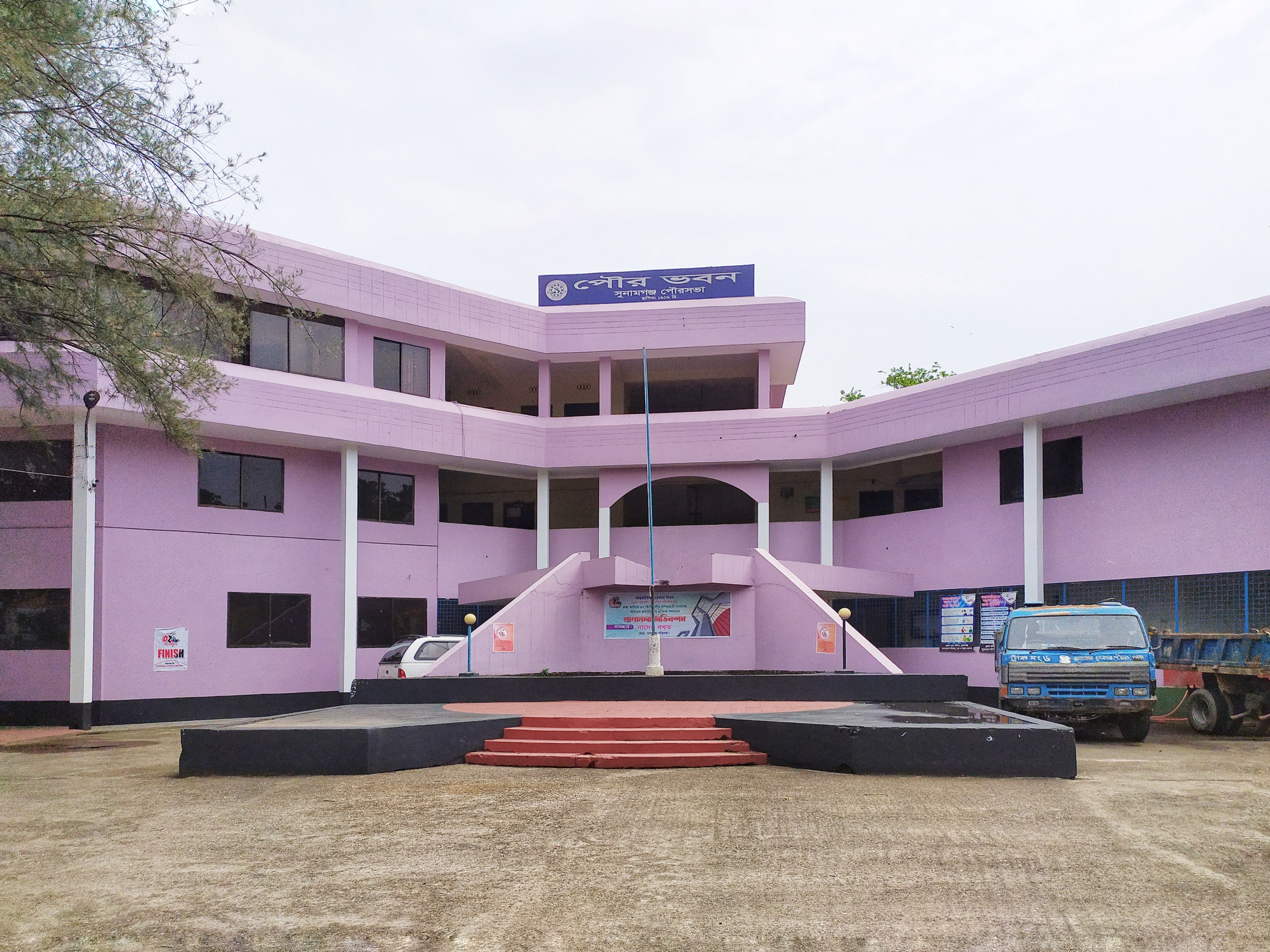
- Sunamganj Municipality building

- Location of Sunamganj in Sylhet division Location of Sunamganj in Bangladesh
- Coordinates: 25.0710°N 91.4035°E
- Country: Bangladesh
- Division: Sylhet
- District: Sunamganj
- Upazila: Sunamganj Sadar
- Municipality: 1960

Government
  - Type: Paurashava
  - Body: Sunamganj Paurashava
  - Mayor: Nader Bakth (AL)

Area
  - Total: 17.39 km^{2} (6.71 sq mi)

Population (2022)
  - Total: 74,570
  - Density: 4,288/km^{2} (11,110/sq mi)
- Time zone: UTC+6 (BST)

Sunamganj Municipality mahallah geocode map

Sunamganj (Bengali: সুনামগঞ্জ), is a town in the Sylhet Division of northeastern Bangladesh. It is the administrative headquarters and largest town of Sunamganj District. It is located on the banks of the Surma River, approximately 50 kilometres (31 mi) west-northwest of Sylhet, the divisional headquarters.

== Municipality ==
The municipality was formed in 1960.

Nader Bakht was elected to a second consecutive term as mayor of Sunamganj in January 2021, as an Awami League candidate. Days later, a warrant was issued for his arrest on allegations that in 2019 he supplied fake birth certificates to Rohingya refugees in Bangladesh. He obtained bail on 21 January.

== Demographics ==
Religions in Sunamganj (2011)
Religion	Percent
Islam	78.68%
Hinduism	21.09%
Other or not stated	0.23%

According to the 2022 Bangladesh census, Sunamganj city had a population of 74,570 and a literacy rate of 81.33%.

According to the 2011 Bangladesh census, Sunamganj city had 11,926 households and a population of 65,332. 14,408 (22.05%) were under 10 years of age. Sunamganj had a literacy rate (age 7 and over) of 60.46%, compared to the national average of 51.8%, and a sex ratio of 949 females per 1000 males.

== See also ==
- Sunamganj District
- Chhatak Upazila
- Derai Upazila
