= Sunamganj District =

Sunamganj District সুনামগঞ্জ জেলা
- District of Bangladesh
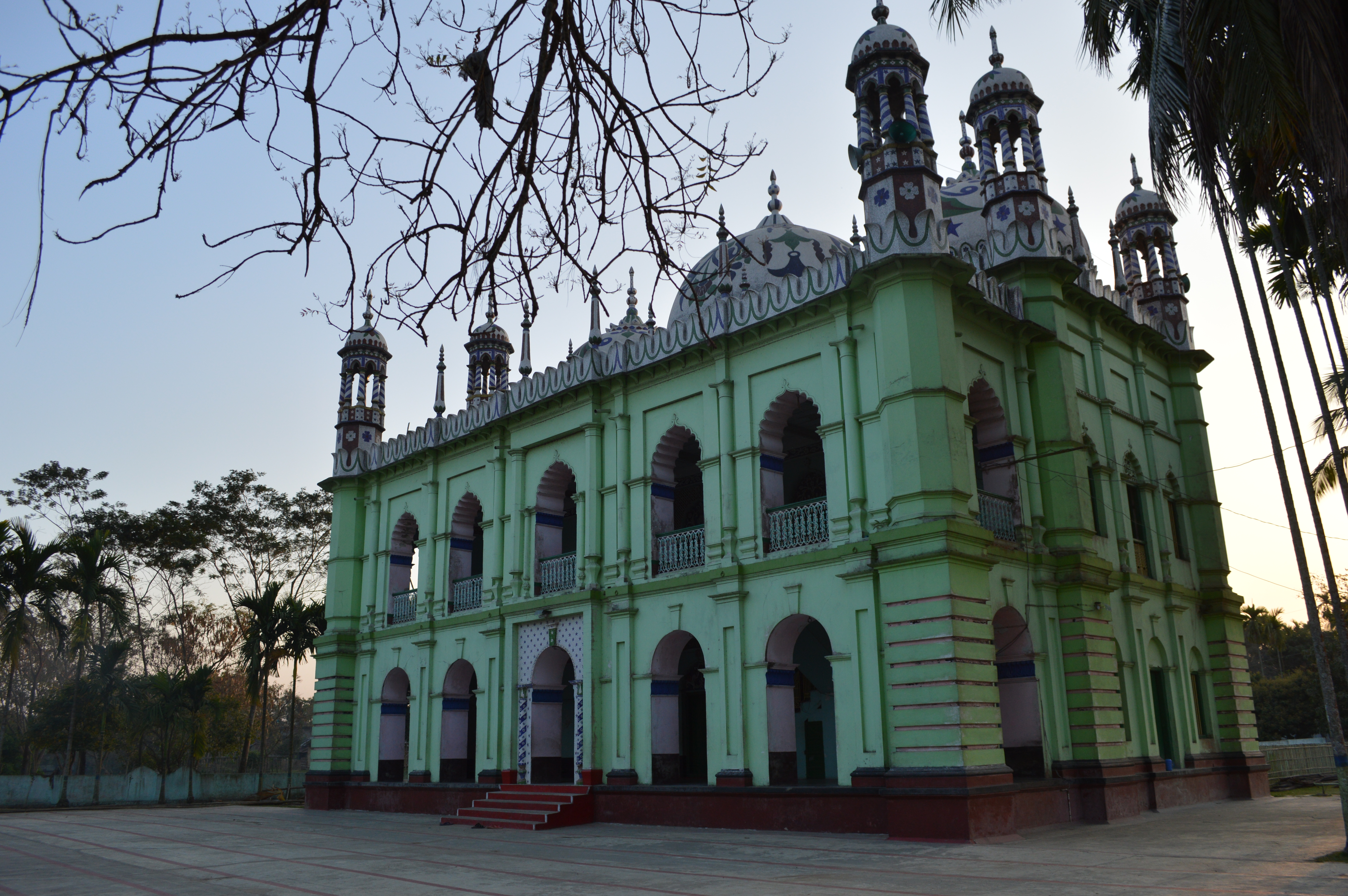
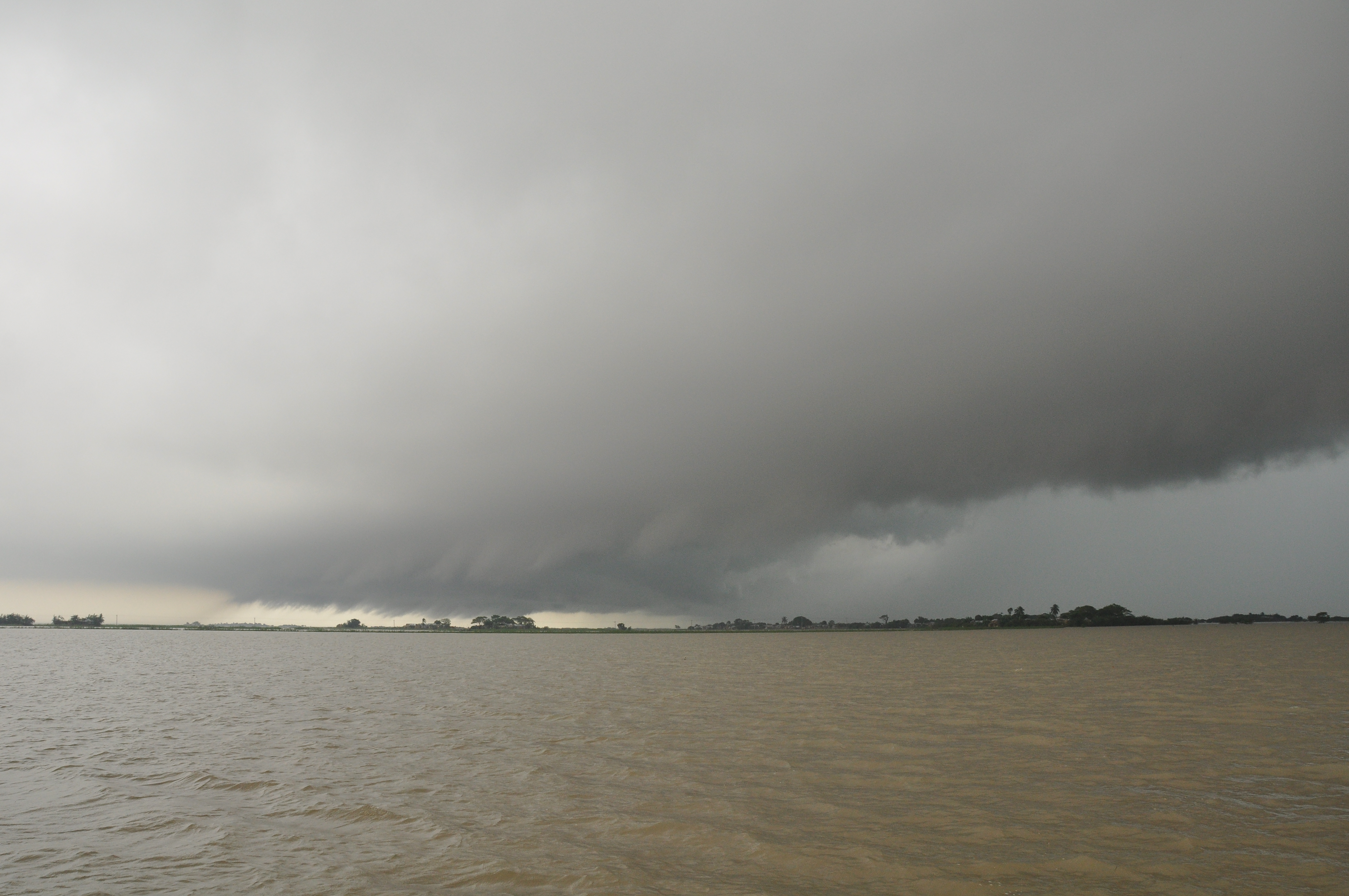
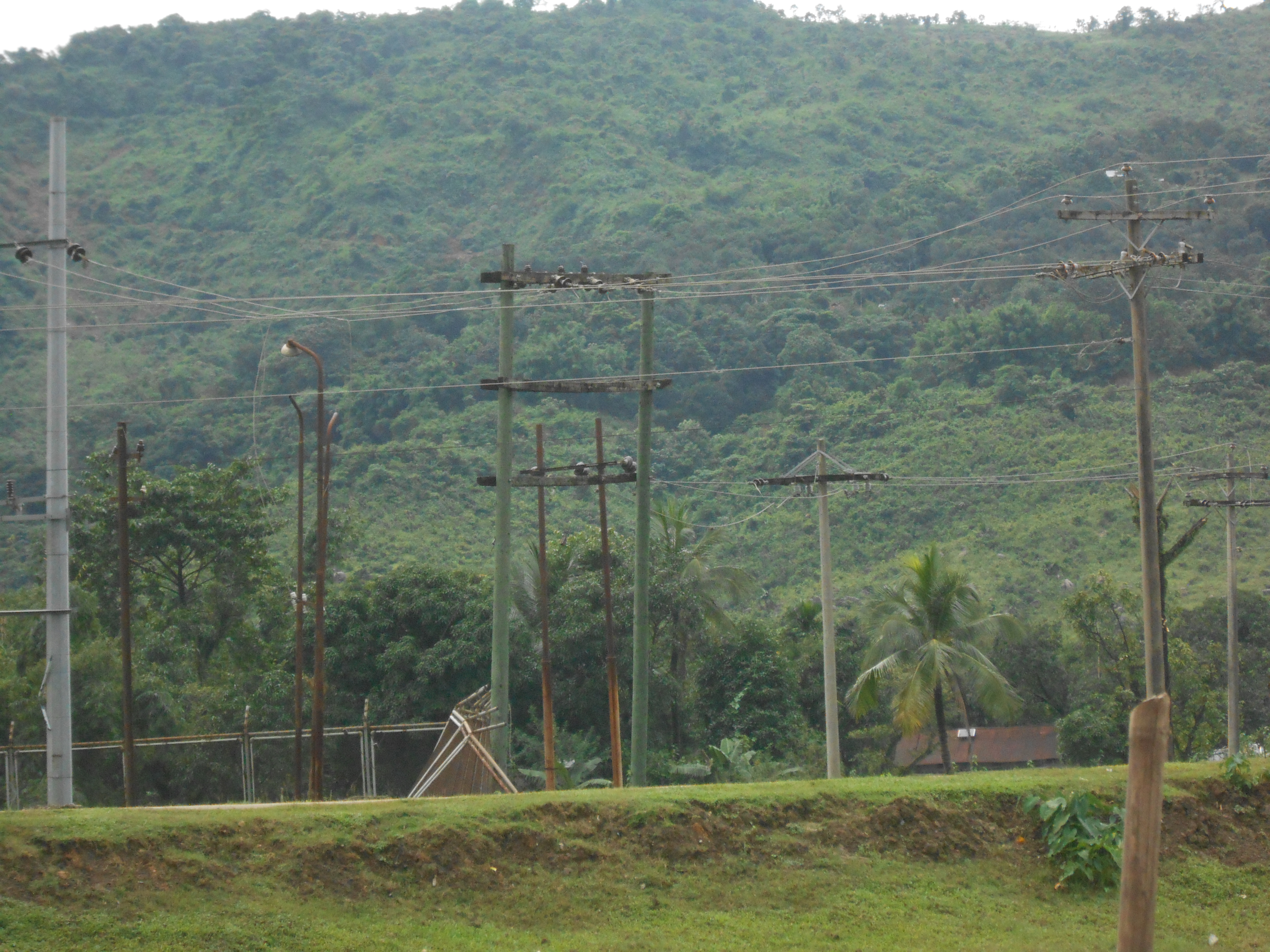
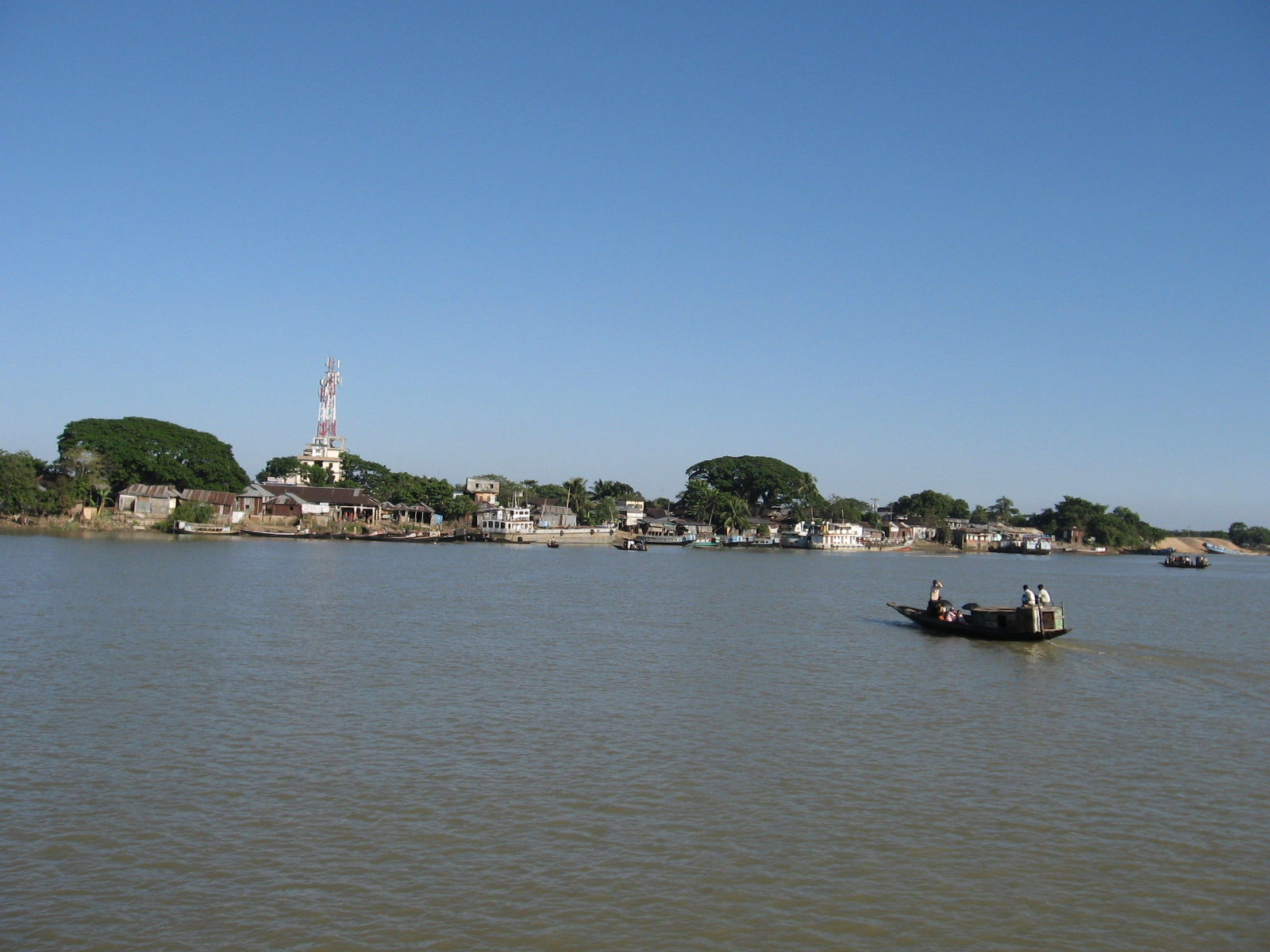
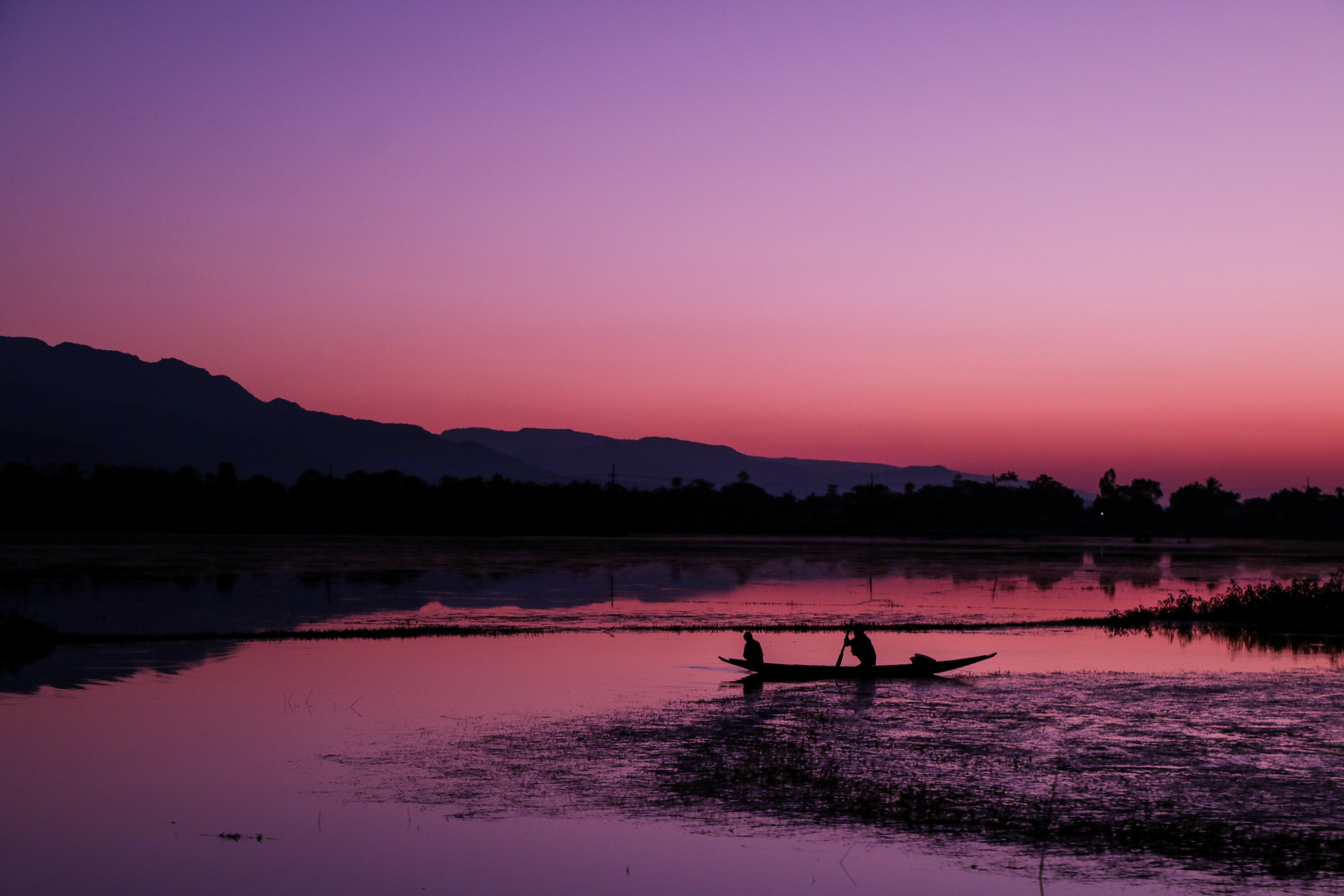
- Clockwise from top-left: Pagla Jame Mosque, Kalirdeep Beel, Surma River near Jamalganj, Tanguar Haor, Tekerghat Hills

- Location of Sunamganj District in Bangladesh
- Expandable map of Sunamganj District
- Coordinates: 25.0309°N 91.4038°E
- Country: Bangladesh
- Division: Sylhet Division
- Headquarters: Sunamganj

Government
  - Deputy Commissioner: Mohammad Minhazur Rahman

Area
  - Total: 3,747.18 km^{2} (1,446.79 sq mi)

Population (2022)
  - Total: 2,695,496
  - Density: 719.340/km^{2} (1,863.08/sq mi)
- Demonym(s): Sunamganji, Shunamgonji, Shunamgoinji
- Time zone: UTC+06:00 (BST)
- Postal code: 3000
- Area code: 0871
- ISO 3166 code: BD-61
- HDI (2019): 0.573 medium · 20th of 20
- Website: www.sunamganj.gov.bd

Sunamganj District (Bengali: সুনামগঞ্জ জেলা) is a district located in north-eastern Bangladesh in Sylhet Division.

== History ==
In the ancient period, Sunamganj was part of the Laur Kingdom. After the conquest of Sylhet (Kingdom of Gauiurh) in 1303 by Muslims under the spiritual guidance of Shah Jalal, Shah Kamal Quhafah established a capital in Shaharpara with the aid of his twelve disciples and his second son, Shah Muazzamuddin Qureshi, who also maintained a second sub-administration office at Nizgaon on the bank of the river Surma, present day Shologhar (there is now Shologhar Masjid and madrasa) in Sunamganj town, which was administered by one of his descendants. Between the latter part of 1300 CE and 1765 CE, the present-day Sunamganj district was a part of Iqlim-e-Muazzamabad, i.e., the state of Muazzamabad, which was an independent state until 1620 when it was conquered by the mighty Mughal of Delhi. The last sultan of Muazzamabad was Hamid Qureshi Khan, who was a descendant of Shah Kamal Quhafah and he was widely known by his appellation of Shamsher Khan. After the fall of Jalalabad (present-day Sylhet), Shamsher Khan accepted the post of Nawab-cum-Fauzadar and remained so until his death at the Battle of Giria on 29 April 1740 along with Sarfaraz Khan, Nawab of Bengal.

== Administration ==
Sunamganj District upazila geocode map

=== District ===
The district administrator is appointed from amongst non-civil servants, usually from amongst the member of political party that is in power at the time of appointment and endorsed by the central government. The deputy commissioner is appointed from amongst career civil servants and administers all subordinate branches of the administration such as Upazila parishad Mr.Black was the first district commissioner of Sunamganj.

=== Subdistricts ===
Sunamganj District comprises 12 sub-districts or upazilas:

- Bishwamvarpur
- Chhatak
- Derai
- Dharamapasha
- Dowarabazar
- Jagannathpur
- Jamalganj
- Madhyanagar
- Shalla
- Shantiganj
- Sunamganj Sadar
- Tahirpur

== Demographics ==
Historical population
Year	Pop.	±% p.a.
1981	1,428,787	—
1991	1,708,563	+1.80%
2001	2,013,738	+1.66%
2011	2,467,968	+2.05%
2022	2,695,496	+0.80%

According to the 2022 Census of Bangladesh, Sunamganj District had 528,550 households and a population of 2,695,496 with an average 5.09 people per household. Among the population, 614,526 (22.80%) inhabitants were under 10 years of age. The population density was 719 people per km^{2}. The literacy rate (age 7 and over) was 64.92%, compared to the national average of 74.80%, and the sex ratio was 96.43 males per 100 females. Approximately, 14.92% of the population lived in urban areas.

Religions in Sunamganj District (2022)
Religion	Percent
Islam	88.20%
Hinduism	11.69%
Other or not stated	0.11%

Religion in present-day Sunamganj District
Religion	1941 (Note: 1941 figures are for Sunamganj subdivision of erstwhile Sylhet district, which roughly corresponds to the present district.)		1981		1991		2001		2011		2022	
Religion	Pop.	%	Pop.	%	Pop.	%	Pop.	%	Pop.	%	Pop.	%
Islam	417,505	65.45%	1,178,109	82.46%	1,428,729	83.62%	1,715,033	85.16%	2,144,535	86.89%	2,377,349	88.20%
Hinduism	217,993	34.17%	246,444	17.25%	272,545	15.95%	294,765	14.64%	319,376	12.94%	315,044	11.69%
Others (Note: Including Jainism, Christianity, Buddhism, Zoroastrianism, Judaism, Ad-Dharmis, or not stated)	2,399	0.38%	4,234	0.29%	7,289	0.43%	3,940	0.20%	4,057	0.17%	3,103	0.11%
Total Population	637,897	100%	1,428,787	100%	1,708,563	100%	2,013,738	100%	2,467,968	100%	2,695,496	100%

Muslims make up 88.20% of the population, while Hindus are 11.69% of the population. There is a minority of 2,600 Christians in the district, mainly in Madhyanagar, Tahirpur and Sunamganj Sadar upazilas. The ethnic population was 5,308, of which 2,003 were Garo and 1,506 Hudi.

== Education ==
University

- Sunamganj Science and Technology University

Medical College

- Sunamganj Medical College

== Healthcare ==
The district has 12 government hospitals and 22 health centers. The infant mortality rate is 62 per 1000 child births. The average lifespan of the district's residents is 62 years.

== Notable people ==
- Advaita Acharya (1434–1559), religious leader and author
- Asaddor Ali (1929–2005), writer, researcher and historian
- Shahed Ali, author and novelist
- Abdus Samad Azad (1922–2005), former Minister of Foreign Affairs
- Dewan Mohammad Azraf, educator, philosopher and National Professor of Bangladesh
- Syeda Shahar Banu (1914–1983), language activist
- Apsana Begum (born 1990), Member of the British Parliament for Poplar and Limehouse
- Kakon Bibi, fighter, Bir Protik
- Anwar Choudhury (born 1959), former Governor of the Cayman Islands and High Commissioner of the UK to Bangladesh
- Phani Bhoushon Choudhury (1954–2016), chief of the Criminal Investigation Department
- Mahmud Ali (1919–2006), politician
- Nazir Ahmed Chowdhury, footballer
- Nirmalendu Chowdhury (1922–1981), musician, composer, lyricist and singer
- Akshay Kumar Das (born 1903), East Pakistani state minister of finance
- Ramkanai Das, classical and folk musician
- Shushama Das, folk musician
- Suhasini Das, social worker and activist
- Sumankumar Dash (born 1982), Bangla Academy Literary Award recipient
- Radharaman Dutta, musician and mystic poet
- Dhruba Esh (born 1967), cover artist and writer
- Satikanta Guha (1910–1991), educator
- Shah Abdul Karim, musician and songwriter
- Ayub Ali Master (1880–1980), social reformer in Britain
- A. Zahur Miah, Member of Parliament, politician
- Bidhan Ranjan Roy Poddar, adviser to the Bangladesh Interim government
- Shah Abdul Majid Qureshi (1915–2003), social reformer in Britain
- Abdur Raees (1931–1988), former Member of Parliament in Pakistan and Bangladesh
- Alaur Rahman, vocalist and music composer
- Luthfur Rahman (born 1976), deputy leader of Manchester, England
- Hason Raja, musician and mystic poet
- Manik Lal Ray, communist politician, teacher pioneer of mass-education, fighter
- Barun Roy (1922–2009), parliamentarian
- Suranjit Sengupta (1945–2017), first Railway Minister of Bangladesh
- Hassan Shahriar, journalist and political analyst
- Durbin Shah, lyricist of Sufi traditional songs
- Munawwar Ali, politician
