= Mohammedpur, Dolarbazar =

Mohammedpur মুহাম্মদপুর
- Village
- Location within Bangladesh
- Coordinates: 24.8518°N 91.6396°E
- Country: Bangladesh
- Division: Sylhet Division
- District: Sunamganj
- Upazila: Chhatak

Population (2011)
  - Total: 660
- Time zone: UTC+6 (BST)

Mohammadpur (Bengali: মুহাম্মদপুর) is a village in Dolarbazar Union of Chhatak Upazila at the North-Eastern part of Bangladesh. Mahammadpur is famous for the mazar (grave) of Rahimullah Shah, a Saint of Islam. Safath Shah, the father of Durbin Shah (poet and singer) also lived in this village. At the middle part of his life Safath Shah migrated from Mahammadpur to Durbin Tila in Chhatak.

== Location ==
Mohammadpur is situated in the south-eastern part of Chhatak Upazila, in Sunamganj District. It is 4.5 kilometres (2.8 mi) south of Dular Bazar and 3.5 kilometres (2.2 mi) west of Singerkach Bazar.

The Makunda River flows at the south-east side of Mahammadpur.

== Nearby village ==
- East: Buraiya
- West: Chelar Char
- North: Alampur
- South: Jahedpur

== Population ==
As of the 2011 Bangladesh census, it had a population of 660.

== Communication ==
Mohammadpur is located about 20.50 kilometres (12.74 mi) south of the upazila headquarters. People use Chhatak-Gobindagonj-Dolarbazar Road and Sylhet-Bishawnath-Singerkach Road for communication with Mahammadpur.

== See also ==
- Chhatak
- Sunamganj
- Sylhet
