= Abdul Hoque =

Bangladeshi politician

- আব্দুল হক

Member of the East Pakistan Provincial Assembly
- In office 1970 – 16 December 1971
- Succeeded by: Abul Hasnat Md. Abdul Hai
- Constituency: NE-128 (Sylhet-IX)

Personal details
- Born: 1930 Sylhet district, Assam Province, British Raj
- Died: 19 December 1971 (aged 40–41) Tuker Bazar, Sylhet district, Bangladesh
- Resting place: Bagbari Cemetery, Sylhet
- Party: AL
- Relatives: Abul Hasnat Md. Abdul Hai (brother)
- Education: Government Jubilee High School; Sunamganj College; University of Dhaka

Abdul Hoque (Bengali: আব্দুল হক; 1930–1971) was a Bangladeshi politician, lawyer and teacher. He was elected as an Awami League candidate at the 1970 Pakistani general election, although the assembly was not inaugurated. He participated as a freedom fighter during the Bangladesh Liberation War.

== Early life and education ==
Abdul Hoque was born in 1930, to a Bengali Muslim family in the village of Bhatgaon in Sylhet district, Assam Province, British Raj (present-day Chhatak Upazila, Sunamganj District, Bangladesh). He was the eldest of the three sons of Moulvi Abdul Wahid and Mahebun Nesa. His younger brother, Abul Hasnat Md. Abdul Hai, was a three-time member of the Jatiya Sangsad.

In 1951, Abdul Hoque passed his matriculation from the Government Jubilee High School in Sunamganj. Abdul Hoque enrolled at the Sunamganj College from where he completed his Intermediate of Arts. He graduated with a Bachelor of Arts and Bachelor of Laws from the University of Dhaka. During his studies in Dhaka, he was elected as the G.S. of Salimullah Muslim Hall.

== Career ==
Abdul Hoque began his career as a lawyer in the Dacca High Court. He then became a teacher at the West End High School until 1968.

=== Politics ===
Abdul Hoque first entered politics during the Bengali language movement of 1952, where he is credited for assembling the Sunamganj Student Society in favour of the Bengali language. During the 1954 East Bengal Legislative Assembly election, Abdul Hoque became an activist for the United Front. He was imprisoned the following year for thirteen months.

During the 1970 Pakistani general election, Abdul Hoque ran as an Awami League candidate from the NE-128 (Sylhet-IX) constituency which covered the thanas of Chhatak (which then included both Dowarabazar and Companiganj) and Jagannathpur. He was successful in this election and set to become a member of the National Assembly of Pakistan, but the assembly was not inaugurated as it was protested by West Pakistani party leaders who did not want an Awami League government. The events eventually led to the Proclamation of Bangladeshi Independence on 26 March 1971 by Sheikh Mujibur Rahman. On the same night, a meeting was held involving the senior politicians of Sunamganj subdivision at the home of Dewan Obaidur Raja Chowdhury. The All-Parties Independent Bengal Council was formed by Chowdhury as a result of the meeting, and its members included Abdus Samad Azad, Abdul Hoque, Suranjit Sengupta, Abdur Raees, Abduz Zahur, Shamsu Mia Chowdhury, Awami League leader Husayn Bakht, NAP leader Ali Yunus, Abdul Quddus and Alfatuddin Ahmad. Among Abdul Hoque's activities during the war was serving as a Civil Adviser of Sector Five and the Chief Co-ordinator of the Chhatak-Jagananthpur-Derai area.

== Death ==
Three days after the Bangladeshi victory, Abdul Hoque died in a road accident at the Sylhet-Sunamganj road on 19 December 1971. The accident occurred in Tuker Bazar on his way back to Sunamganj in a private car from a Sangram Committee meeting at the Sylhet Circuit House. Alongside him was Bir Protik Idris Ali who survived the accident. Some of Abdul Hoque's demanded that he be buried in Chhatak town. His janaza was performed the next day, and was attended by Bangladesh Armed Forces founder M. A. G. Osmani, Comrade Manik Mia, Mudarris Ali BA, Shafiqul Hoque, MCA Shamsu Mia Chowdhury, Abdul Wadud, Commander Abdus Salam, Angur Mia Chowdhury, Mudarris Mia Chowdhury, Taimus Raja, Muqit Chowdhury, Moyna Mia, Shamsher Ali, Lutfur Rahman Pradhan, Accha Mia, Amir Ali Badshah and others. He was then buried in the Bagbari cemetery of Sylhet.

== Legacy ==
In 1972, the Abdul Hoque Memorial Degree College was established in Govindaganj, Chhatak. Through the efforts of politician Mohibur Rahman Manik, a memorial was made at Banshtala, the headquarters of Liberation Sector Five, and the area was renamed to Hoqnagar (City of Hoque) in 1996. The Hoqnagar-Banshtala area has now become a tourist attraction due to the presence of the memorial and more work is being done there.
