= List of Bangla Academy Literary Award recipients (1960–1969) =

This is a list of the recipients of the Bangla Academy Literary Award from 1960 to 1969.

== 1960 ==
1. Farrukh Ahmad (poetry)
2. Abul Mansur Ahmed (short story)
3. Abul Hashem Khan (novel)
4. Abdullah Hel Kafi (essay-research)
5. Mohammad Barkatullah (essay-research)
6. Askar Ibne Shaikh (drama)
7. Khan Mohammad Moinuddin (juvenile literature)

== 1961 ==
1. Ahsan Habib (poetry)
2. Syed Waliullah (novel)
3. Mobin Uddin Ahmed (short story)
4. Muhammad Abdul Hye (essay-research)
5. Nurul Momen (drama)
6. Begum Hosney Ara (juvenile literature)

== 1962 ==
1. Sufia Kamal (poetry)
2. Abul Fazal (novel)
3. Shawkat Osman (short story)
4. Akbar Ali (novel)
5. Munier Choudhury (drama)
6. Bande Ali Mia (juvenile literature)

== 1963 ==
1. Abul Hussain (poetry)
2. Abu Ishaque (novel)
3. Abu Rashid Matin Uddin (short story)
4. Abdul Quadir (essay-research)
5. Ibrahim Khan (drama)
6. Kazi Kader Newaj (juvenile literature)

== 1964 ==
1. Sanaul Huq (poetry)
2. Benajir Ahmed (poetry)
3. Shamsuddin Abul Kalam (novel)
4. Shahed Ali (short story)
5. Muhammad Enamul Huq (essay-research)
6. Akbaruddin (drama)
7. Ashraf Siddiqui (juvenile literature)
8. Habibur Rahman (juvenile literature)

== 1965 ==
1. Talim Hossain (poetry)
2. Mahbub Ul Alam (novel)
3. Alauddin Al-Azad (short story)
4. Muhammad Mansuruddin (essay-research)
5. Obaidul Huq (drama)
6. Mohammad Modabber (juvenile literature)

== 1966 ==
1. Mahmuda Khatun Siddiqua (poetry)
2. Kazi Afsaruddin Ahmed (novel)
3. Syed Shamsul Haque (short story)
4. Qazi Motahar Hossain (essay-research)
5. Sikandar Abu Zafar (drama)
6. Abu Zoha Nur Ahmed (juvenile literature)

== 1967 ==
1. Syed Ali Ahsan (poetry)
2. Sarder Jayenuddin (novel)
3. Abdul Gaffar Chowdhury (short story)
4. Mazharul Islam (essay-research)
5. ANM Bazlur Rashid (drama)
6. Mohammad Nasir Ali (juvenile literature)

== 1968 ==
1. Al Mahmud (poetry)
2. Abu Jafar Shamsuddin (novel)
3. Shawkat Ali (short story)
4. Ahmed Sharif (essay-research)
5. Anis Chowdhury (drama)
6. Rokanuzzaman Khan (juvenile literature)

== 1969 ==
1. Shamsur Rahman (poetry)
2. Shahidullah Kaiser (novel)
3. Burhanuddin Khan Jahangir (short story)
4. Nilima Ibrahim (essay-research)
5. Ali Monsur (drama)
6. Golam Rahman (juvenile literature)
