= Abul Hasnat Md. Abdul Hai =

Bangladeshi politician

Abul Hasnat Muhammad Abdul Hai
- আবুল হাসনাত আব্দুল হাই

Member of the Bangladesh Parliament for Sunamganj-5
- In office 1986–1988
- Preceded by: Abul Hasnat Md. Abdul Hai
- Succeeded by: Kalim Uddin Ahmed

Member of the Bangladesh Parliament for Sylhet-5
- In office 1979–1982
- Preceded by: Abduz Zahur
- Succeeded by: Boundaries changed

Member of the Bangladesh Parliament for Sylhet-4
- In office 1973–1979
- Preceded by: Post established
- Succeeded by: Iqbal Hossain Chowdhury

Personal details
- Born: Bhatgaon, Chhatak, Sylhet district
- Died: 12 October 2010 Sunamganj District, Bangladesh
- Party: Jatiya Party
- Parents: Moulvi Abdul Wahid (father); Mahebun Nesa (mother)
- Relatives: Abdul Hoque

Abul Hasnat Muhammad Abdul Hai (Bengali: আবুল হাসনাত মোহাম্মদ আব্দুল হাই; died 12 October 2010) was a Bangladeshi politician. He was elected a member of the Jatiya Sangsad (National Parliament) from the seats of 227 Sunamganj-4 (Vishwambhar and Sunamganj sadar) and 228-Sunamganj-5 (Chhatak-Dowarabazar). He was elected a member of parliament for the first time as an independent candidate from Sylhet-4 in the 1973 first parliamentary elections. In the second parliamentary election an independent candidate in 1979, he was elected a member of the parliament in the Sylhet-5 constituency. He was a member of the Jatiya Party's elected a member of the parliament from Sunamganj-5 seat in the last 1986 in the third parliamentary election.

== Birth and early life ==
Abdul Hai was born into a Bengali Muslim family in the village of Bhatgaon in Chhatak (then under Sylhet district). He was the second of the three sons of Moulvi Abdul Wahid and Mahebun Nesa. His elder brother, Abdul Hoque, was also a politician and participated in the Bangladesh Liberation War.

== Political life ==
Abdul Hai, a senior politician in Sunamganj District of Sylhet Division of Bangladesh. He was elected a member of parliament for the first time as an independent candidate from Sylhet-4 in the 1973 first parliamentary elections. In the second parliamentary election an independent candidate in 1979, he was elected a member of the parliament in the Sylhet-5 constituency. He was a member of the Jatiya Party's elected a member of the parliament from Sunamganj-5 seat in the last 1986 in the third parliamentary election.

== Death ==
Abdul Hai died on 12 October 2010 at his home in Sunamganj.
