= Nurul Islam Nurul =

Bangladeshi politician

- নুরুল ইসলাম নুরুল

Member of the Bangladesh Parliament for Sunamganj-4
- Incumbent
- Assumed office 17 February 2026
- Preceded by: Mohammad Sadique

Personal details
- Born: 9 October 1976 (age 49) Sunamganj Sadar Upazila, Sunamganj District
- Party: Bangladesh Nationalist Party

Nurul Islam Nurul is a Bangladeshi politician of the Bangladesh Nationalist Party. He is currently serving as a member of parliament from Sunamganj-4.

== Early life ==
Nurul was born on 9 October 1976 at Sunamganj Sadar Upazila under Sunamganj District.
