= Fazlul Haque Aspia =

Bangladeshi politician (died 2021)

Member of Bangladesh Parliament
- In office 1996–2001
- Preceded by: A. Zahur Miah
- Succeeded by: Fazlul Haque Aspia
- In office 28 October 2001 – 27 october 2006
- Preceded by: Fazlul Haque Aspia
- Succeeded by: Momtaj Iqbal

Personal details
- Born: 1935 or 1936
- Died: 15 September 2021 (aged 85)
- Resting place: Shah Jalal Dargah Cemetery, Sylhet, Bangladesh
- Party: Bangladesh Nationalist Party

Fazlul Haque Aspia (Bengali: ফজ়লুল হক আস্পিয়া; 1935/6 – 15 September 2021) was a Bangladesh Nationalist Party politician and a member of parliament for Sunamganj-4.

== Career ==
Aspia was elected to parliament from Sunamganj-4 as a Bangladesh Nationalist Party candidate in 1996 and 2001. He served as the whip during the 8th parliamentary session.

Aspia died on 15 September 2021 at the age of 85.
