= Shahed Ali =

Shahed Ali may refer to:

- Shahed Ali (writer)
- Shahed Ali (actor)

== See also ==
- Shahed Ali Patwary, Pakistani lawyer and politician
