= Sunamganj-5 =

Bangladeshi parliamentary constituency

Coordinates: 25.03°N 91.66°E

- Constituency for the Jatiya Sangsad
- District: Sunamganj District
- Division: Sylhet Division
- Electorate: 415,954 (2018)

Current constituency
- Created: 1984
- Party: Bangladesh Nationalist Party
- Member: Kalim Uddin Ahmed
- ← 227 Sunamganj-4 229 Sylhet-1 →

Sunamganj-5 is a constituency represented in the Jatiya Sangsad (National Parliament) of Bangladeshsince 2026 by Kalim Uddin Ahmed of the Bangladesh Nationalist Party.

== Boundaries ==
The constituency encompasses Chhatak and Dowarabazar upazilas.

== History ==
The constituency was created in 1984 from the Sylhet-12 constituency when the former Sylhet District was split into four districts: Sunamganj, Sylhet, Moulvibazar, and Habiganj.

Ahead of the 2008 general election, the Election Commission redrew constituency boundaries to reflect population changes revealed by the 2001 Bangladesh census. The 2008 redistricting altered the boundaries of the constituency.

Ahead of the 2014 general election, the Election Commission expanded the boundaries of the constituency. Previously it had excluded one union parishad of Dowarabazar Upazila: Mannargaon.

== Members of Parliament ==
Election	Member	Party
1986	Abul Hasnat Md. Abdul Hai	Jatiya Party
1988	Kalim Uddin Ahmed	
1991	Abdul Mazid	Jatiya Party (Ershad)
Feb 1996	Kalim Uddin Ahmed	Independent (politician)
Jun 1996	Mohibur Rahman Manik	Awami League
2001	Kalim Uddin Ahmed	Bangladesh Nationalist Party
2008	Mohibur Rahman Manik	Awami League
2014	Mohibur Rahman Manik	Awami League
2018	Mohibur Rahman Manik	Awami League
2024	Mohibur Rahman Manik	Awami League
2026	Kalim Uddin Ahmed	Bangladesh Nationalist Party

== Elections ==
General Election 2014: Sunamganj-5
Party	Candidate	Votes	%	±%
AL	Muhibur Rahman Manik	164,494	98.1	+32.8
BNF	Mohammad Ashraf Hossain	3,264	1.9	N/A
Majority		161,230	96.1	+64.4
Turnout		167,758	47.7	−38.8
AL hold				

=== Elections in the 2000s ===
General Election 2008: Sunamganj-5
Party	Candidate	Votes	%	±%
AL	Mohibur Rahman Manik	165,697	65.3	+25.2
BNP	Kalim Uddin Ahmed	85,197	33.6	−21.0
NAP	Md. Abdul Odud	2,712	1.1	+0.5
Majority		80,500	31.7	+17.2
Turnout		253,606	86.5	+16.7
AL gain from BNP				

General Election 2001: Sunamganj-5
Party	Candidate	Votes	%	±%
BNP	Kalim Uddin Ahmed	113,660	54.6	+31.7
AL	Mohibur Rahman Manik	83,500	40.1	+11.2
IJOF	Abdul Mazid	9,523	4.6	N/A
NAP	Md. Abdul Odud	1,306	0.6	N/A
KSJL	Abdul Jalil	243	0.1	N/A
Majority		30,160	14.5	+13.4
Turnout		208,232	69.8	+2.6
BNP gain from AL				

=== Elections in the 1990s ===
General Election June 1996: Sunamganj-5
Party	Candidate	Votes	%	±%
AL	Mohibur Rahman Manik	42,720	28.9	N/A
JP(E)	Md. Yahya	41,120	27.8	+9.7
BNP	Kalim Uddin Ahmed	33,875	22.9	+15.2
Samridhya Bangladesh Andolan	Abdul Mazid	11,248	7.6	N/A
Jamaat	Abdullah Md. Saleh	10,067	6.8	−3.8
IOJ	Mohammad Shafiq Uddin	6,981	4.7	−5.7
Sammilita Sangram Parishad	Md. Jalal Uddin	1,196	0.8	N/A
Independent	Md. Abdul Odud	575	0.4	N/A
Majority		1,600	1.1	−0.3
Turnout		147,782	67.2	+17.6
AL gain from Independent				

General Election 1991: Sunamganj-5
Party	Candidate	Votes	%	±%
JP(E)	Abdul Mazid	22,266	18.1	
Independent	Md. Yahya	20,518	16.7	
Ganatantri Party	Mohibur Rahman Manik	17,695	14.4	
Jamaat	Siraj Uddin	13,027	10.6	
IOJ	A. Salam	12,851	10.4	
Independent	Abdur Rahim	9,864	8.0	
BNP	Zoinul Karim	9,467	7.7	
Independent	Abul Hasnat Md. Abdul Hai	7,530	6.1	
Independent	Kalim Uddin	7,019	5.7	
Independent	Sirajul Islam	2,368	1.9	
JSD	Abul Lais	436	0.4	
Majority		1,748	1.4	
Turnout		123,041	49.6	
JP(E) gain from				
