= Md. Matiur Rahman (Sunamganj politician) =

Bangladeshi politician

Member of Bangladesh Parliament
- In office 2009 – 9 January 2014
- Preceded by: Momtaj Iqbal
- Succeeded by: Pir Fazlur Rahman

Personal details
- Party: Bangladesh Awami League

Md. Matiur Rahman is a Bangladesh Awami League politician and a former member of parliament for Sunamganj-4.

== Career ==
Matiur Rahman was elected to parliament from Sunamganj-4 as a Bangladesh Awami League candidate in 2009 in a by-election following the death of Momtaj Iqbal, the incumbent. He is the president of the Sunamganj District unit of the Bangladesh Awami League.
