= Sunamganj-4 =

Constituency of Bangladesh's Jatiya Sangsad

Coordinates: 25.07°N 91.40°E

- Constituency for the Jatiya Sangsad
- District: Sunamganj District
- Division: Sylhet Division
- Electorate: 289,030 (2018)

Current constituency
- Created: 1984
- Party: Bangladesh Nationalist Party
- Member: Nurul Islam Nurul
- ← 226 Sunamganj-3 228 Sunamganj-5 →

Sunamganj-4 is a constituency represented in the Jatiya Sangsad (National Parliament) of Bangladesh since 2026 by Nurul Islam Nurul of the Bangladesh Nationalist Party.

== Boundaries ==
The constituency encompasses Bishwamvarpur and Sunamganj Sadar upazilas.

== History ==
The constituency was created in 1984 from a Sylhet constituency when the former Sylhet District was split into four districts: Sunamganj, Sylhet, Moulvibazar, and Habiganj.

Ahead of the 2008 general election, the Election Commission redrew constituency boundaries to reflect population changes revealed by the 2001 Bangladesh census. The 2008 redistricting altered the boundaries of the constituency.

Ahead of the 2014 general election, the Election Commission reduced the boundaries of the constituency. Previously it had also included one union parishad of Dowarabazar Upazila: Mannargaon.

== Members of Parliament ==
Election	Member	Party
1986	Iqbal Hossain Chowdhury	NAP
1991	A. Zahur Miah	Awami League
Feb 1996	Fazlul Haque Aspia	Bangladesh Nationalist Party
2001	Fazlul Haque Aspia	Bangladesh Nationalist Party
2008	Momtaj Iqbal	Jatiya Party (Ershad)
2009 by-election	Md. Matiur Rahman	Awami League
2014	Pir Fazlur Rahman	Jatiya Party (Ershad)
2018	Pir Fazlur Rahman	Jatiya Party (Ershad)
2024	Mohammad Sadique	Awami League
2026	Nurul Islam Nurul	Bangladesh Nationalist Party

== Elections ==
=== Elections in the 2020s ===
General Election 2024: Sunamganj-4
Party	Candidate	Votes	%	±%
AL	Mohammad Sadique	90,552		
JP(E)	Pir Fazlur Rahman	31,718		

=== Elections in the 2010s ===
Pir Fazlur Rahman was elected unopposed in the 2014 general election after opposition parties withdrew their candidacies in a boycott of the election.

=== Elections in the 2000s ===
Momtaj Iqbal died in April 2009. Md. Matiur Rahman, of the Awami League, was elected in a June 2009 by-election.

General Election 2008: Sunamganj-4
Party	Candidate	Votes	%	±%
JP(E)	Momtaj Iqbal	123,883	62.7	N/A
BNP	Fazlul Haque Aspia	58,964	29.9	−13.1
Independent	Dewan Shamsul Abedin	9,764	4.9	N/A
Bangladesh Khelafat Majlish	Mohammad Azizul Haque	4,303	2.2	N/A
Independent	Nazir Hossain	558	0.3	N/A
Majority		64,919	32.9	+26.0
Turnout		197,472	85.5	+11.5
JP(E) gain from BNP				

General Election 2001: Sunamganj-4
Party	Candidate	Votes	%	±%
BNP	Fazlul Haque Aspia	61,807	43.0	+9.9
AL	Dewan Shamsul Abedin	51,864	36.1	+4.6
IJOF	Momtaj Iqbal	30,160	21.0	N/A
Majority		9,943	6.9	+5.3
Turnout		143,831	74.0	+2.9
BNP hold				

=== Elections in the 1990s ===
General Election June 1996: Sunamganj-4
Party	Candidate	Votes	%	±%
BNP	Fazlul Haque Aspia	36,155	33.1	+5.2
AL	Abduj Jahur	34,360	31.5	+3.9
JP(E)	Iqbal Hossain Chowdhury	31,209	28.6	+1.0
Jamaat	Md. Hatimur Rahman	6,940	6.4	+1.0
Zaker Party	Nurul Amin	274	0.3	N/A
Gano Forum	Syed Kabir Ahmed	248	0.2	N/A
Majority		1,795	1.6	−3.6
Turnout		109,186	71.1	+14.9
BNP hold				

General Election 1991: Sunamganj-4
Party	Candidate	Votes	%	±%
AL	A. Zahur Miah	30,649	33.1	
BNP	Dewan Shamsul Abedin	25,865	27.9	
JP(E)	Iqbal Hossain Chowdhury	25,555	27.6	
Jamaat	Sajidur Rahman	5,024	5.4	
Independent	Mosihur Rahman	3,836	4.1	
Jatiya Samajtantrik Dal-JSD	Shaheed Chowdhury	635	0.7	
Bangladesh Samajtantrik Dal (Mahbub)	Binod Ranjan Talukdar	513	0.6	
FP	A. Bablu Ribora	510	0.6	
Majority		4,784	5.2	
Turnout		92,587	56.2	
AL gain from				
