= Govindaganj =

Gobindaganj is a market town within the upazila of Chhatak, in the District of Sunamganj, Sylhet Division, Bangladesh. The market town lies on the banks of the rivers, Dahuka and Surma and it is situated in a strategically important area for development as it is lies on the junction of 2 major roads leading to towns of, Sylhet, Sunamganj and Chhatak. As well as having an excellent road network, the town sits on the route of the Akhaura–Kulaura–Chhatak Line and hosts the Afzalabad Railway Station, situated on banks of the River Dahuka on the outskirts of the town. In all the town is well connected by road, river and rail making it a very desirable location for businesses and residents seeking for that modern urban lifestyle and an alternative to the bustling city of Sylhet.

== See also ==
- Chhatak
- Khola Gaon
- Sunamganj
- Sylhet Division
