= Haydarpur =

Haydor Pur হায়দরপুর
- Village
- Location in Bangladesh
- Coordinates: 24.840°N 91.552°E
- Country: Bangladesh
- Division: Sylhet Division

Area
  - Total: 1.36 km^{2} (0.53 sq mi)

Population (2011 census)
  - Total: 3,000
  - Density: 2,200/km^{2} (5,700/sq mi)
- Demonym: Haydarpuri
- Time zone: UTC+06:00 (BST)
- Postal code: 3060
- Website: bhatgaonup.sunamganj.gov.bd

Haydarpur (Bengali: হায়দরপুর) is a village in northeastern Bangladesh in Bhatgaon Union of Chhatak Upazila, in Sunamganj District, within the division of Sylhet Division. Agriculture is the primary occupation of the village.

== Nearby villages ==
- East: Jhigli
- West: Sripatipur
- North: Mandalpur
- South: Sonuakai

== Education ==
- Haydor Pur High School (established in 1999)
- Haydor Pur Government Primary School (established in 1954)
- Haydor Pur Islamia Hafizia Madrasa (established in 1990)

== See also ==
- List of villages in Bangladesh
