= Jahedpur =

Jahidpur
- Village
- Location within Bangladesh
- Coordinates: 24.8443°N 91.6347°E
- Country: Bangladesh
- Division: Sylhet Division
- District: Sunamganj
- Upazila: Chhatak
- Union Parishad: Dolarbazar
- Ward: 4

Government
  - UP Member (Ward 4): Muhammad Azir Uddin Jahidpuri

Population (2011)
  - Total: 9,881
- Time zone: UTC+6 (BST)

Jahedpur is a village in the 4th ward of Dolarbazar Union in the south-eastern part of Chhatak Upazila in the Sunamganj District of Bangladesh's Sylhet Division.

== Geography ==
Jahedpur is situated on the southern bank of Makunda River. The village is 2 km long from east to west.

=== Nearby villages ===
- North-East: Rampur - Muhammadpur and Vawal.
- North: Alampur and Chandpur
- North-West: Sherpur and Chelarpar
- West: Anujani-Boratuka, Meoatoil
- South-West: Basantopur
- South: Kachurkandi, Gobinda Pur, and Jugol Nogor (across haor).
- South-East: Norshinghpur-Talupat and Sutarkhali.
- East: Buraiya, Chisrawoli, Khaghata.

== Demographics ==
According to the 2011 Bangladesh census, Jahedpur had 1,548 households and a population of 9,881. The literacy rate (age 7 and over) was 51.4%, compared to the national average of 51.8%.

== Economy ==
Most of the villagers work in agriculture. Expatriates from the village support it economically. There are two Bazars in Jahedpur, namely, Jahedpur Puran Bazar and Jahedpur Notun Bazar.

== Government offices ==
The Jahedpur post office formerly served 30 surrounding villages. Its post code number is 3087.

The Jahedpur police inspection centre (জাহিদ পুর পুলিশ তদন্ত কেন্দ্র)was established on 29 September 2018. The Jahedpur Tahshil office (জাহিদ পুর তহশীল অফিস) (Land office)was established since the early Pakistan period covering the whole south east areas of the Chhatak Upazila. There is a primary health Clinic which runs in Jahedpur.

There are two private Banks in Jahedpur Notun Bazar (The "Eastern Bank" and "Dutch Bangla Bank") in addition to an ATM (South East Bank).

== Education ==
There is one primary school (Jahedpur Government Primary School), established in 1900; one secondary school (Jahedpur High School), established in 1974; one Dakhil (secondary) madrasah, established in 1974; and one Hafizia Madrasa.

There was an Aided Girls primary School, established in 1961, (in Badshah Bari) which was merged with the Jahedpur Government Primary School by the Education Authority in 1972.

A Women Hafizia Madrasah known as "খাদিজাতুল কোবরা (রাঃ)হাফিজিয়া মাদরাসা"Founded by "ASSIAT"(অসিয়াত) foundation was established in 2023.

A women's college known as "Jahedpur Women's College" (the first and only women college in Chhatak Upazila) was established in June 2024.

Also one English medium kindergarten and an Islamic kindergarten run in Jahedpur.

There are 3 masjids in Jahedpur. Two jamme masjid (larger congregations) and one smaller masjid.

A library known as "Jahedpur Adorsho Gono Patagar" was established 1985. They published a Magazine in 1987 namely "পদক্ষেপ".

== See also ==
- List of villages in Bangladesh
