= Kushtia High School =

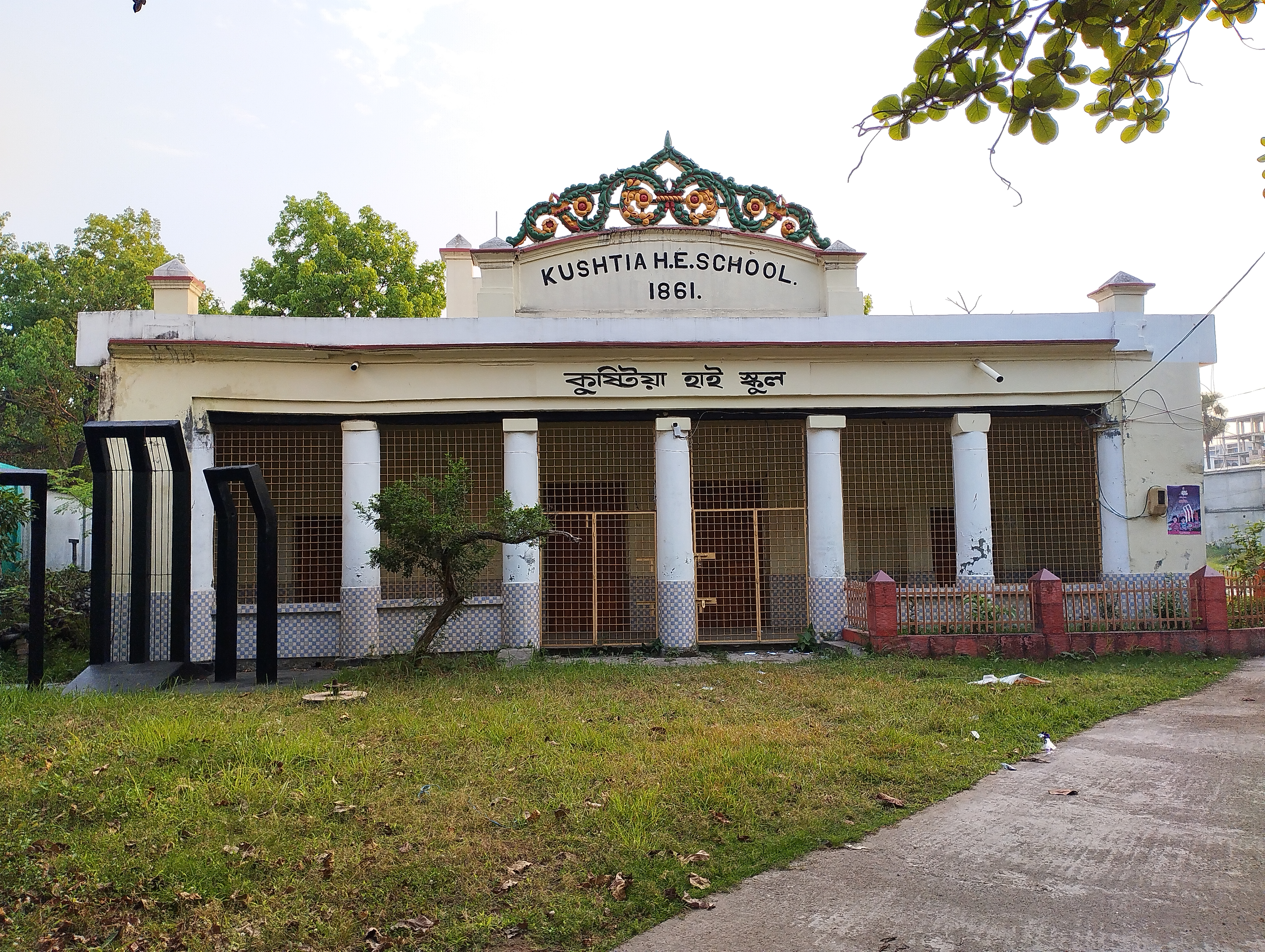
- Jubilee Building (Oldest building)

Location
- NS Road (Panch Rastar Mor); Kushtia, 7000; Bangladesh
- Coordinates: 23.9090739°N 89.1245934°E

Information
- Other name: Kushtia High School and College
- Former name: Kushtia H.E. School
- School type: MPO-listed Secondary school
- Established: 1861; 165 years ago
- Founders: Gurudas Chakraborty; Jagat Chandra Lahiri; Ramjoy Saha; Ramsundar Pal
- School board: Jessore Board of Education
- School district: Kushtia
- School code: 117817
- Language: Bengali
- Area: 8.3 acres (34,000 m^{2})
- Campus type: Urban
- Website: kushtiahighschoolandcollege.jessoreboard.gov.bd

Kushtia High School is an old secondary school located in Kushtia city. The school was established in 1861. The then zamindar of Shilaidaha, Debendranath Tagore, was one of the main donors of the school's land. Currently, the school is under the Jessore Education Board.

== History ==
In 1861 the school was founded in what is now Kushtia town as "Kushtia H.E. School" through the efforts of Gurudas Chakraborty a senior clerk of the Kushtia sub-division, police inspector Jagat Chandra Lahiri, Ramjoy Saha and Ramsundar Pal.

=== British Era ===
Initially classes were held in a thatched shed. In 1887–1888 a four-room building was constructed known as the "Jubilee Building," which remains the oldest structure on campus. Local zamindars and businessmen contributed financially to its construction. An inscription plaque inside the hall of the Jubilee Building lists the names of these contributors.

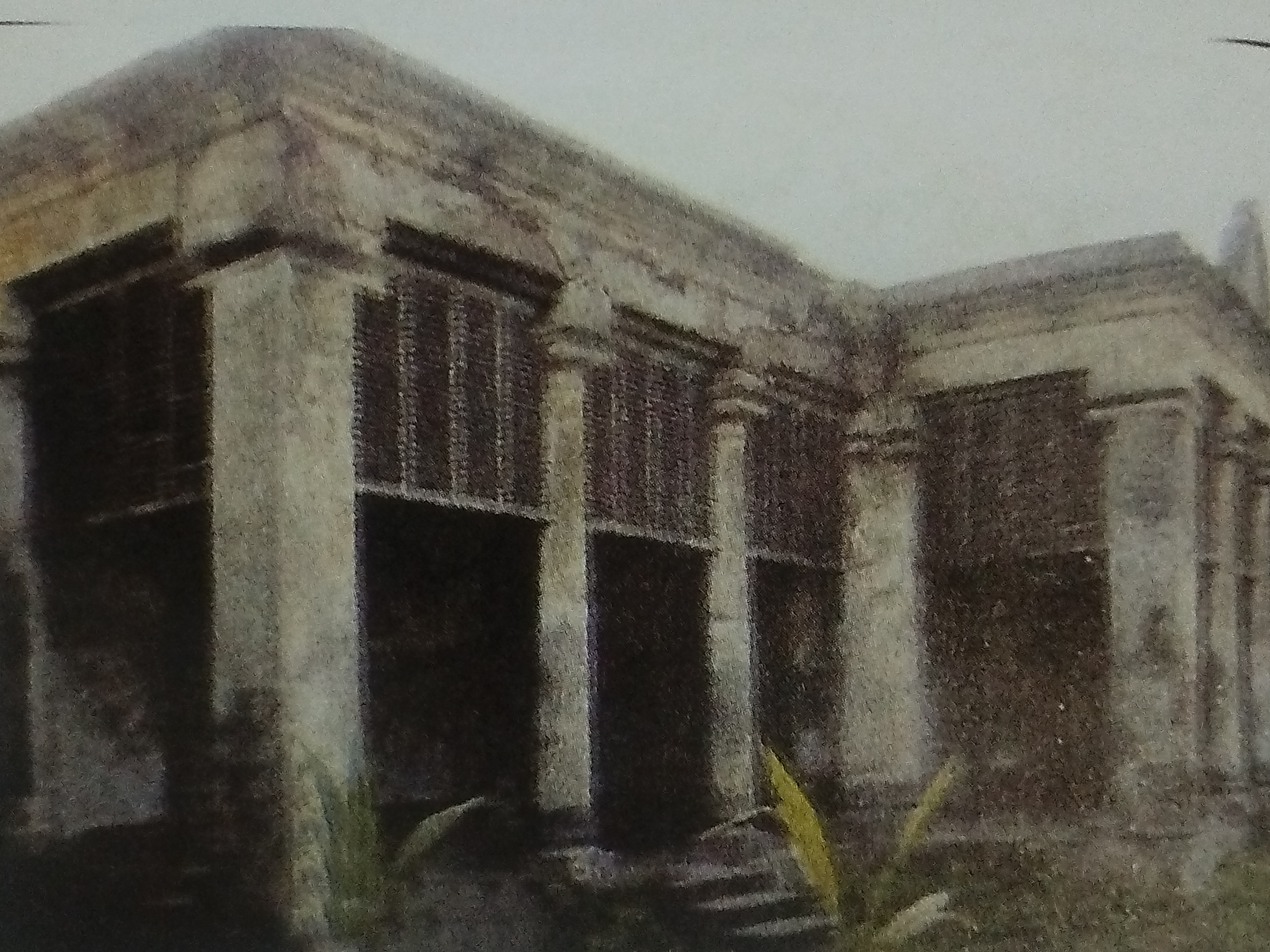
Demolished Ezekiel Islamia Hostel

In 1910 a brick hostel for Muslim students, named "Ezekiel Islamia Hostel" was built to the west of the Jubilee Building. The foundation stone was laid on 28 June 1910 by S.L. Maddox the administrator of the Presidency Division, with efforts from Maulvi Aminul Islam (Sub-divisional Magistrate of Kumarkhali) and Maulvi Masud-ul-Haque (Sub-Registrar). The hostel was named after J.A. Ezekiel the then District Magistrate of Nadia District. The hostel was inaugurated on 26 January 1911 by A.W. Collins another administrator of the Presidency Division.

Although the majority of the school's students were Hindus and a Hindu hostel was originally planned it remains unclear why the Muslim hostel was built first. Eventually with the support of local dignitaries, a separate Hindu hostel named "Coronation Hindu Hostel" was built to the east of the Jubilee Building. However, little reliable information is available about its construction. Both hostel buildings were demolished during later campus renovations.

During World War II in 1942 due to the threat of Japanese bombings several Kolkata-based educational institutions relocated to what was then East Bengal (now Bangladesh). As part of this initiative Bangabasi College from Kolkata was temporarily relocated to Kushtia High School. During that period Kushtia High School's operations were shifted to the then "High English Girls' School" (now Kushtia Government Girls High School).

=== Pakistan Period ===
After the partition of India in 1947 there were no suitable buildings in Kushtia for the newly established district police lines. The East Pakistan government took over the school building and Kushtia High School was merged with the "Municipal Academy" located at what is now Chand Sultana Secondary Girls School. The new institution was named "The United Kushtia High School and Municipal School" and functioned under that name until 30 June 1965. On 1 July 1965, Kushtia High School returned to its original premises. The school had earlier received recognition from the University of Calcutta in 1947 which was later withdrawn.

=== Post-Independence Period ===
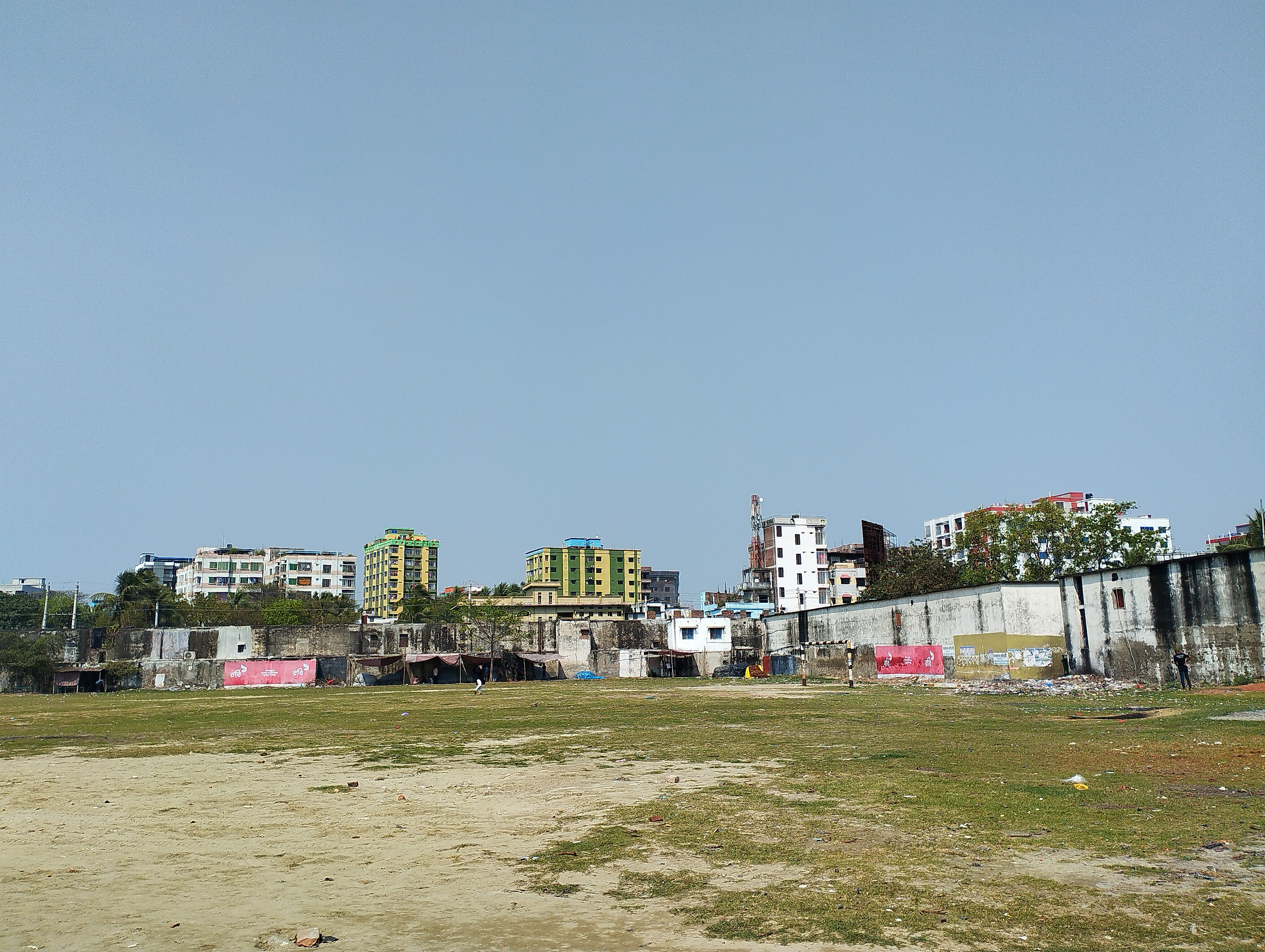
Playground of the school

Until 1972, the school operated under the name "United High School" and then resumed its original name, "Kushtia High School." To support the institution financially the Kushtia Municipality built a market with 165 shops in front of the school field along NS Road. As a result the school ground became smaller and its buildings are no longer visible from the outside. Before the construction of the Kushtia Stadium in 1979 national parades, district sports competitions and football leagues were held on this school ground.

== Notable alumni ==
- Abul Hussain – Bangladeshi poet
- Qazi Motahar Hossain – Statistician, translator, writer, and chess player
- Golam Kuddus – Bengali poet, fiction writer, and journalist
- Radhabinod Pal – Bengali jurist and former vice-chancellor of the University of Calcutta
- Haradhan Banerjee – Indian actor

== Gallery ==
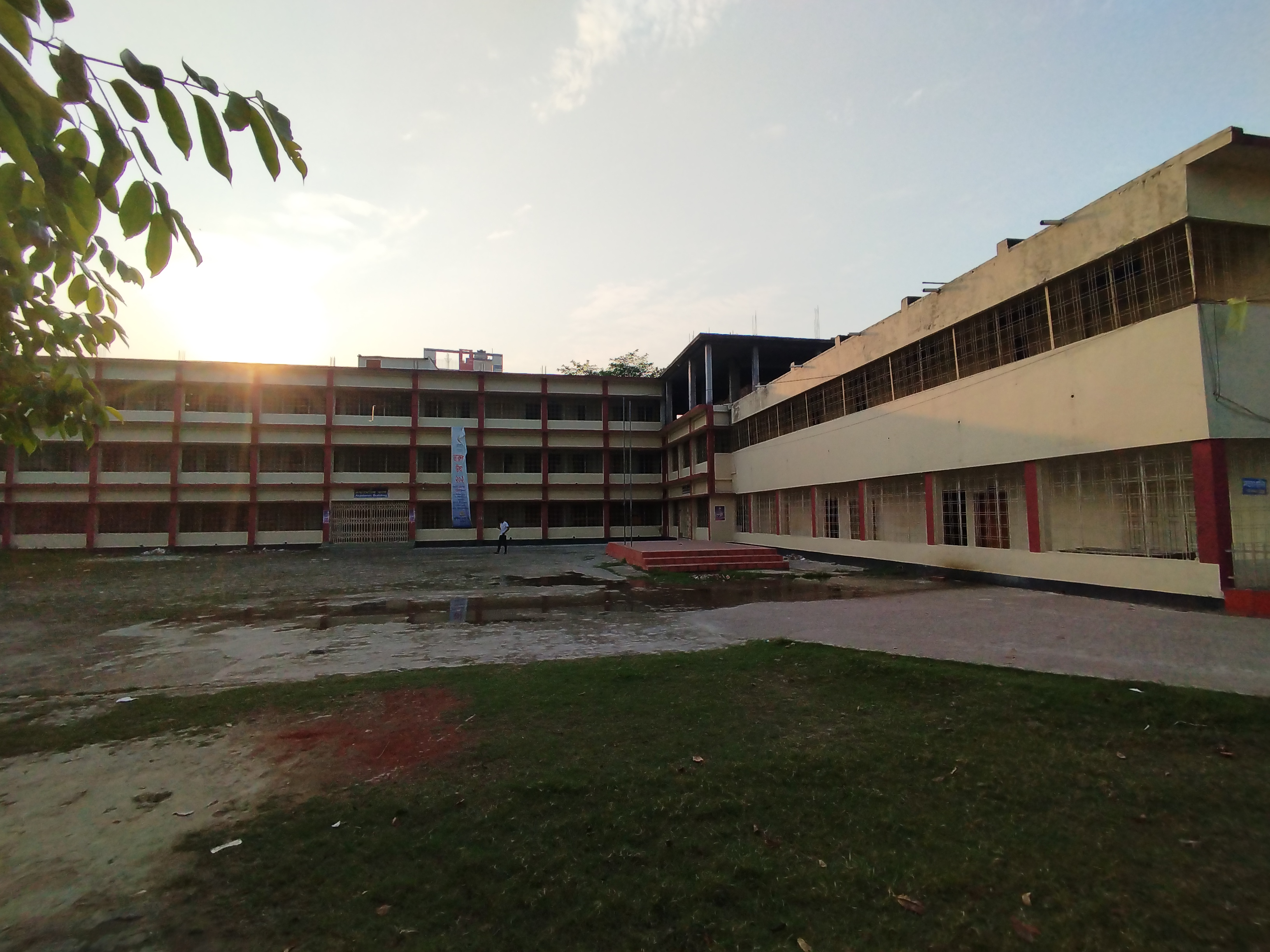

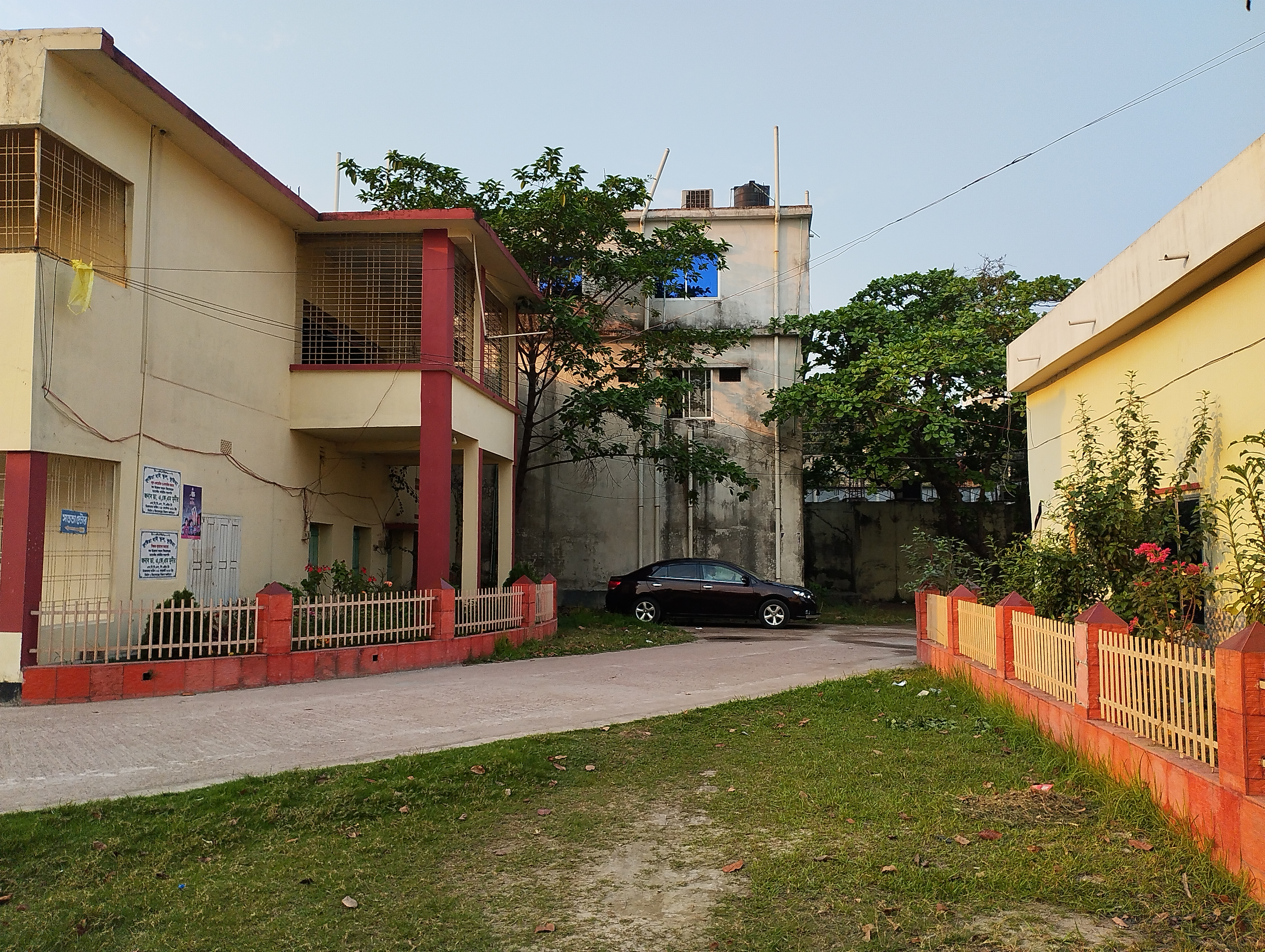

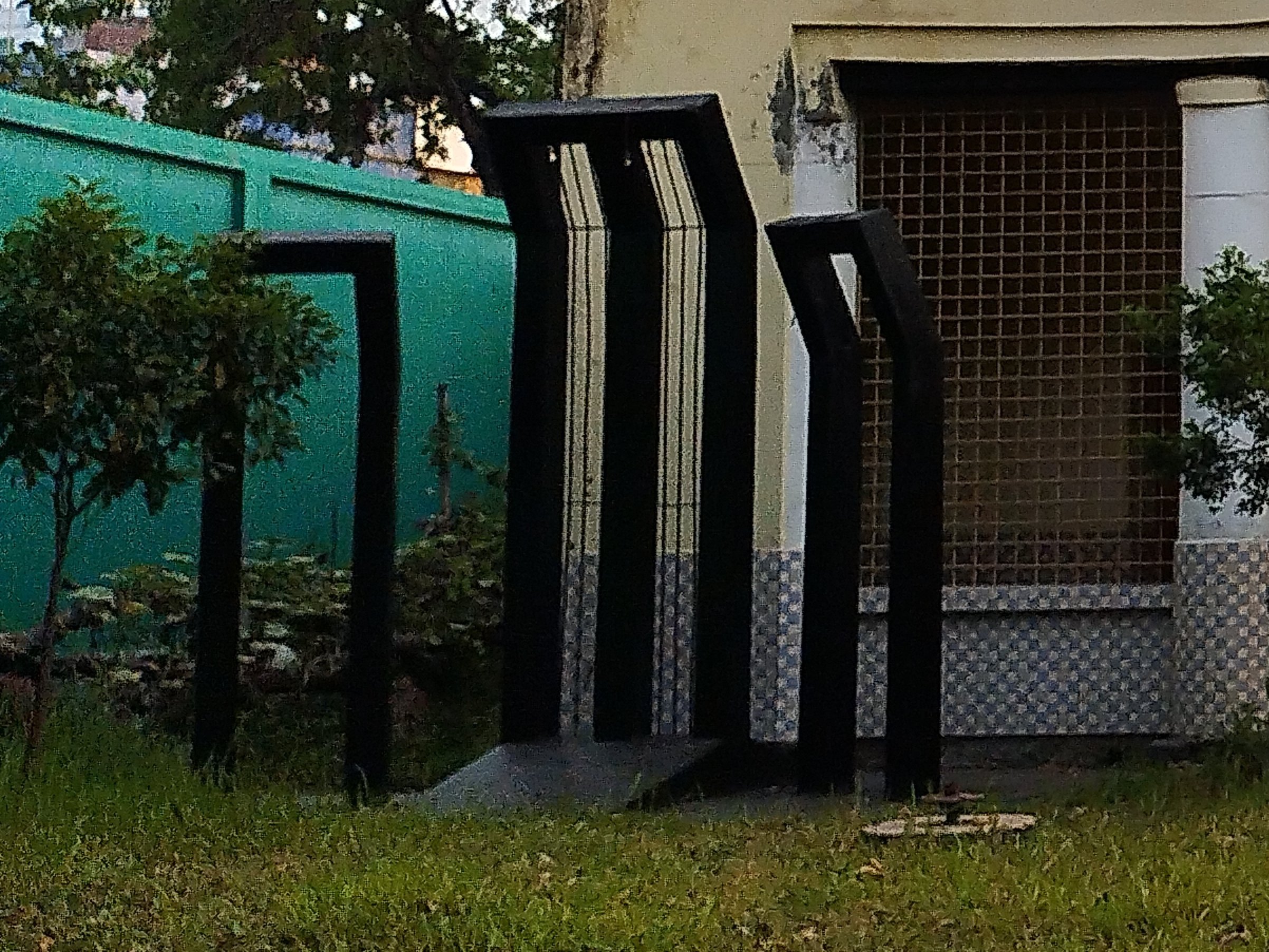

== External ==
- Media related to Kushtia High School at Wikimedia Commons
