= Pir Fazlur Rahman =

Bangladeshi politician

- পীর ফজলুর রহমান

Member of Parliament
- In office 29 January 2014 – 29 January 2024
- Preceded by: Matiur Rahman
- Succeeded by: Mohammad Sadique
- Constituency: Sunamganj-4

Personal details
- Born: 9 January 1969 (age 56)
- Party: Jatiya Party

Pir Fazlur Rahman (Bengali: পীর ফজলুর রহমান) is a Bangladeshi politician and a former Member of Parliament from Sunamganj-4.

== Early life ==
Rahman was born on 9 January 1969. He completed his undergraduate and graduate degrees in law.

== Career ==
Rahman was elected to Parliament from Sunamganj-4 as a Jatiya Party (Ershad) candidate in 2014 and re-elected in 2018 with the support of Awami League Party.

He lost the 2024 election to the Awami League Party candidate Mohammad Sadique.
