= Abdul Mazid (politician) =

Bangladeshi politician

Member of Parliament
- Preceded by: Kalim Uddin Ahmed
- Succeeded by: Kalim Uddin Ahmed

Personal details
- Party: Jatiya Party

Abdul Mazid is a Bangladeshi politician and the incumbent Member of Parliament from Sunamganj-5.

== Career ==
Abdul Mazid was elected to Parliament from Sunamganj-5 as a Jatiya Party candidate in 1991.
