= Makunda River =

River in Bangladesh

Coordinates: 24.8238°N 91.6533°E

The Makunda River is a branch of the Surma in Chhatak and Bishwanath Upazilas, Sunamganj District, Bangladesh. Many important places such as Rajagonj, Boiragi Bazar, Koro Para village, Singer Kach Bazaar, Lakeshbor, Buria and Jahedpur are located on the banks of the Makunda.

== River flow ==
After originating from the Surma, the Makunda ends in the western end of Jahedpur village.
