= Shahid Saber =

Bengali journalist and political activist

Shahid Saber was the pen name of the writer and journalist AKM Shahidullah. He was killed by Pakistan Army when they burned down The Daily Sangbad office on 31 March 1971.

== Early life ==
Saber was born in Eidgah, Cox's Bazar District, Chittagong Division on 18 December 1930. He studied in Eidgah Primary School after which he joined Hare School, Kolkata in the fourth grade. He joined Chittagong Collegiate School after the partition of India and graduated from that college in 1949. He got admitted to Chittagong College after that. As a student he was involved with various cultural organizations including Chhotader Asar and Mukul Fouj Movement. In 1950 he was arrested as part of a government crackdown on communists and passed his I.A. exam from Rajshahi Central Jail in 1951. He was released in 1954. He graduated from Jagannath College in 1955 with a B.A.

== Career ==
Saber worked at Dhaka West End High School as an assistant teacher. He left the high school to join The Daily Sangbad as an assistant editor. He successfully completed the Federal Information Service examination but was denied a position because of his time spent in jail. In 1958 he experienced a mental breakdown and never fully recovered. He wrote a number of books including a prison memoir.

== Death ==
Saber used to live in the office of The Daily Sangbad. On 31 March 1971 the Pakistan Army burned down the Newspaper office killing him. At the time of his death, he was 40 years old.
