= Mahmudul Haque =

- Born: 16 November 1941; Barasat, Calcutta, British India
- Died: 21 July 2008 (aged 66–67); Dhaka, Bangladesh

Mahmudul Haque (c. 1941 – 21 July 2008) was a Bangladeshi writer. He won Bangla Academy Literary Award in 1977.

== Early life and career ==
Mahmudul Haque's family moved to Azimpur, Dhaka after the 1947 partition of India. He attended West End High School and was a student Jagannath College in the late 1950s. Soon after graduation, he went to work, managing the new family business, Tasmen Jewellers at Baitul Mukarram.

Mahmudul Haque began by writing short stories, and his first story called Durghotona was published in the magazine Sainik in 1953. He wrote his first novel Jekhane Khonjona Pakhi (later on renamed as Onur Pathshala) in 1967. He wrote a volume of short stories Protidin Ekti Rumal and a book for juveniles Chikkore Kabuk.

Mahmudul Haque translated some of Mexican fiction writer Juan Rulfo's poems into Bangla.

== Works ==
- Onur Pathsala (1967)
- Nirapod Tandra (1974)
- Jeebon Amar Bon (1976)
- Matir Jahaj (1977)
- Kalo Baraf (1977)
- Khelaghar (1978)
- Chikkore Kabuk
- Oshoriri (1980)
