= Mohibur Rahman Manik =

Bangladeshi politician

- মুহিবুর রহমান মানিক

Member of the Bangladesh Parliament for Sunamganj-5
- In office 25 January 2009 – 6 August 2024
- Preceded by: Kalim Uddin Ahmed
- In office 14 July 1996 – 13 July 2001
- Preceded by: Kalim Uddin Ahmed

Personal details
- Born: 28 February 1962 (age 64)
- Party: Bangladesh Awami League

Mohibur Rahman Manik (born 28 February 1962) is a Bangladesh Awami League politician and a former Jatiya Sangsad member representing the Sunamganj-5 constituency.

== Early life ==
Manik was born on 28 February 1962. He has an LLB degree from the University of Dhaka.

== Career ==
Manik was elected to parliament from Sunamgaj-5 in 1996. In his first year, he worked to establish a memorial in Banshtala, the headquarters of Liberation Sector Five, and renamed it to Hoqnagar (City of Hoque) after local freedom fighter Abdul Hoque.

His home in Sylhet was attacked with bombs on 15 March 1999. The bombs were thrown through the window and killed two of his relatives. He was not present at home during the attack. He is the former vice-president of Sunamganj District unit of Bangladesh Awami League.

Manik was elected to Parliament from Sunamganj-5 in 2008 and reelected on 5 January 2014 as a candidate of Bangladesh Awami League.

== Controversy ==
Manik was arrested from Bashundhara Residential Area by Rapid Action Battalion in October 2024 following the fall of the Sheikh Hasina led Awami League government.
