= Government Jubilee High School, Sunamganj =

- সরকারি জুবিলী উচ্চ বিদ্যালয়, সুনামগঞ্জ
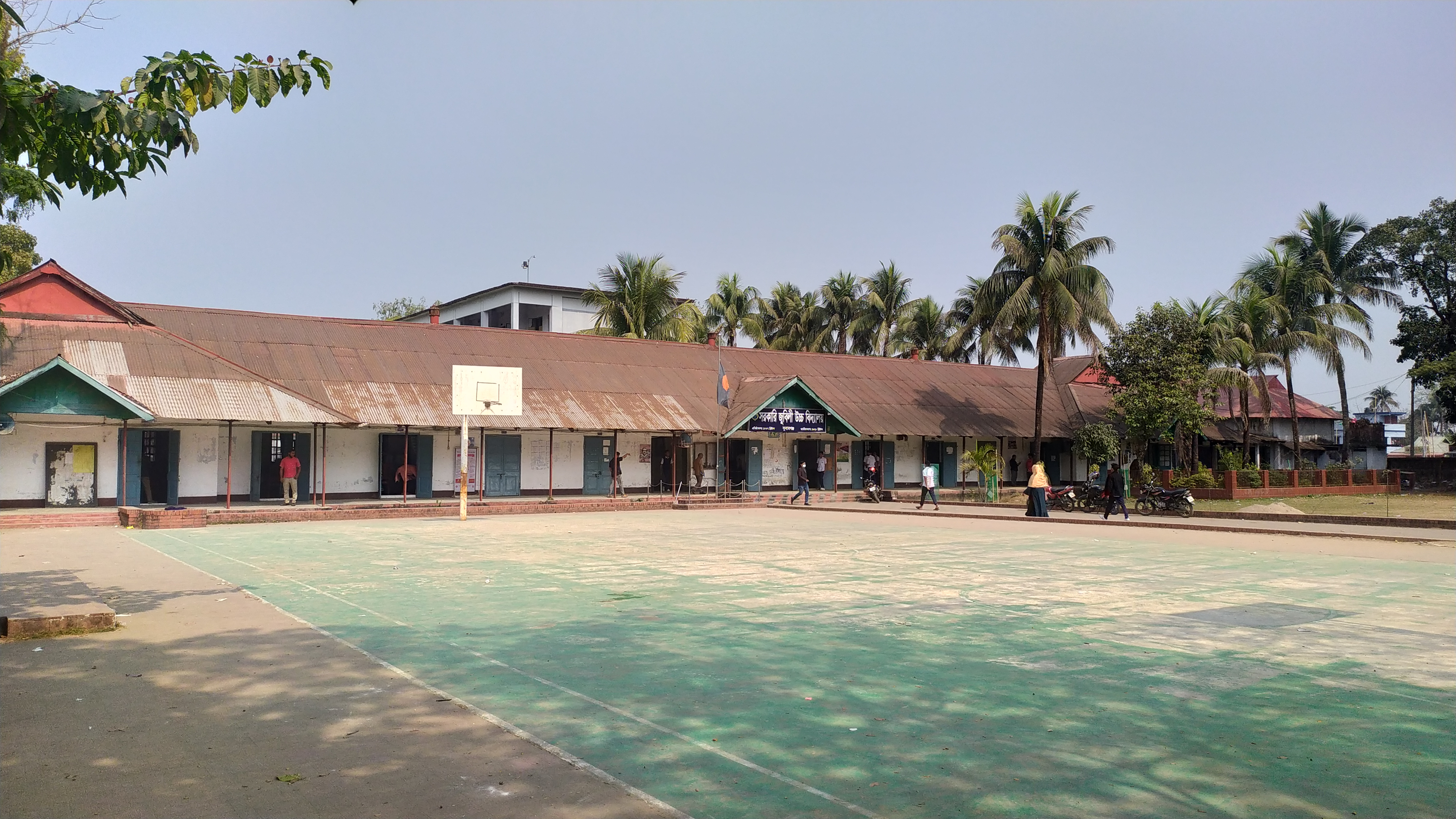

Location
- Sunamganj; Bangladesh; 25.0719°N 91.4035°E

Information
- School type: Secondary Boys School
- Established: 1887
- Headmaster: MD Monsur Rahman Khan
- Head teacher: Deputy Commissioner Sunamganj
- Teaching staff: 50
- Gender: Boys
- Enrollment: 1558
- Classes: 53
- Language: Bengali
- Slogan: Study Is Power
- Sports: Cricket, football, hockey, basketball
- Team name: Jubileean
- Publication: Kishalay
- Website: gjhs.edu.bd

Government Jubilee High school, Sunamganj, is a public secondary school in Sunamganj District, Bangladesh. It was established in 1887 by Prassana –Kumar Dey, son of Pran Krishna Nath Roy Choudhury, Zamindar of Kajalshah and the first person to graduate from Presidency College of Calcutta from Sylhet. Pran Krishna Nath Roy Choudhury donated land in the early 18th century for the Jugaltila Akhara in memory of his father the Zamindar of Gouripur Jugal Kishore Roy Choudhary which today houses the ISKON Temple. Who was the only son of Nawab Siraj ud Doula, adopted son by Mayman Sing Zamindar.

Prassanas house in Sunamgunj was where poor students were educated free of cost. The school was nationalized in 1928.

It is situated in the middle of Sunamganj township on the bank of the river where Prassana had his house which was absorbed by the Surma. Today it operates level 3 to level 10 (SSC). Over its history, the school has had notable alumni, including philosopher former foreign minister of Bangladesh Abdus Samad Azad.

The school consists of three main buildings and a school library in a separate building. There are three playgrounds inside the school compound, and the main school playground (also known as Balur Math) is just outside the school boundary wall. The annual sports take place on the main field.

== Campus ==
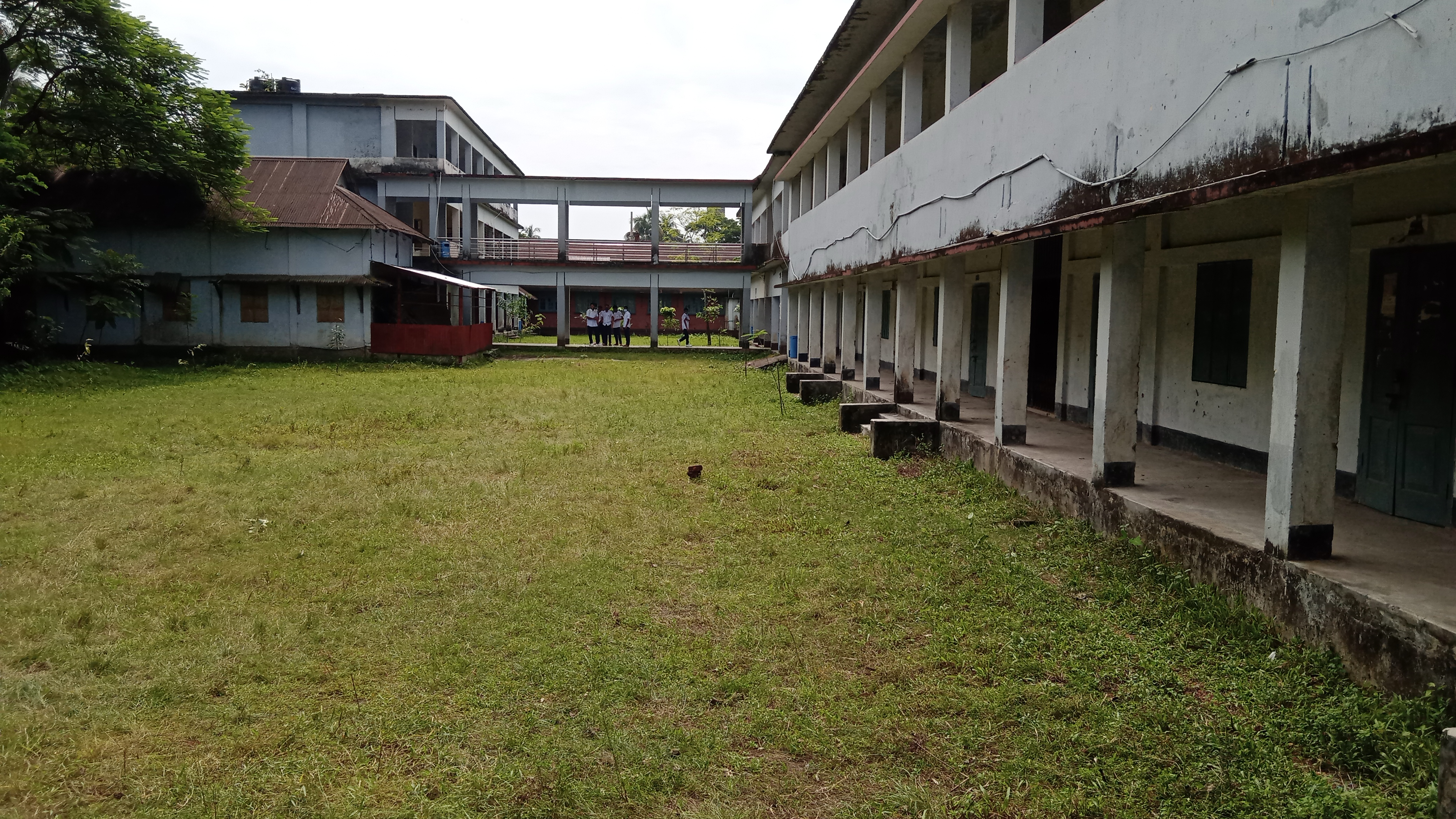
Academy buildings

The school is situated on 6.45 acres land. There is an enriched library, 5 academic and administrative building, two detached boys hostel for Hindu and Islam religionists. It has a big and decorated auditorium where all kinds of school functions are held. School Meetings take place at here. It is also used for students examination. There is also a well equipped prayer room for Muslim for students, students can say prayer. For ablution a row of water tap has made, here students can perform ablution. British period old building has been renovated. Shaheed Minar is situated at front side. Few days ago a new basketball court has been made for basketball practice. The school field is also adjacent to the school. The field is goes by there Balur Math. School annual sports competition and various different occasions take place at this field.

== Co-curricular activities ==
=== Bangladesh National Cadet Core ===
Govt. Jubilee High school is a part of Bangladesh National Cadet Core. Mr. Abdul Mokoddus Is the team leader of GJHS BNCC.

=== School Scout ===
The scout team of Govt. Jubilee High school is a leading scout team in Sunamganj District. Mr. Biplab Ketan Chatterjee Is the team leader of GJHS Scouts.

=== Red Crescent ===
The school Red Crescent Unit helps people affected by floods and other natural calamities. They organize Basic First Aid workshops for the students of schools and colleges.

==== Debating Club ====
Govt. Jubilee High school Debating Club was founded in 2015. Every year they organize inter-school and inter-class debate competitions. they started a children's debate. In 2015 they organized a Club debate (university and college) competition, Govt. Jubilee High school is only school level club who organize a club debate in Sunamganj District.

The school has an English language club.

== Alumni ==
- Abdus Samad Azad, former Minister of Foreign Affairs (Bangladesh)
- Abul Hasnat Md. Abdul Hai, member of parliament
- Asaddor Ali, writer, researcher and historian
- Shahed Ali, journalist and writer
- Bidhan Ranjan Roy Poddar, advisor to Interim government
- A. Zahur Miah, former MP
