= Dilruba Z. Ara =

Swedish-Bangladeshi writer

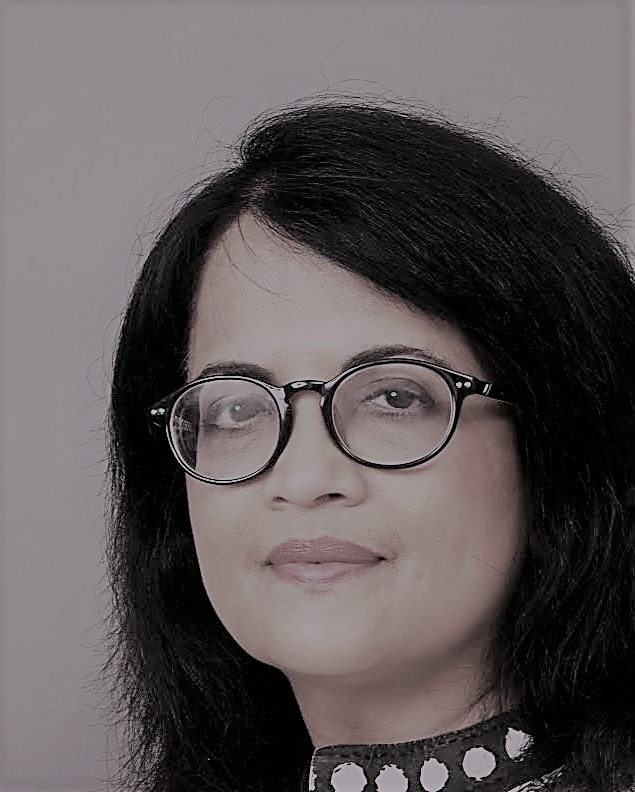
- Born: 20 November 1957 (age 68); Dhaka, Bangladesh
- Education: University of Gothenburg (Fil.Kand.) Lund University (B.Ed.)
- Occupations: Writer, translator, painter, educator
- Children: 2
- Writing career
- Language: English, Bengali, Swedish
- Notable works: A List of Offences; Blame; Detached Belonging

Dilruba Z. Ara (born 20 November 1957) is a Swedish Bangladeshi writer, novelist, artist, educator and translator.

== Background ==
Ara was born into a distinguished literary family in Bangladesh. Her father, Shahed Ali, was a Language Movement veteran, translator and Bangla Academy award-winning author of Gabriel's Wings. Her mother, Professor Chemon Ara, now retired, is also an acknowledged author and Language Movement veteran. She has three brothers and two sisters.

== Career ==
- First novel A List of Offences was published in 2006.
- Second novel Blame was published in 2015.
- Collection of stories Detached Belonging was published in 2016.
- Translation work Selected Short Stories by Shahed Ali was published in 2006.
- Translation work En Flod till hjärta was published in 2021 .

== Education ==
Bachelor of Education: Lund University, Sweden.

Alma Mater: University of Gothenburg, Sweden.

== Bibliography ==
=== Books ===
- A List of Offences (2006).
- Blame (2015).
- Detached Belonging (2016).

=== Short stories ===
Published in Chattahoochee Review, Drunken Boat, Asia Writes, Democratic World Magazine, Swedish Institute, The Daily Star, Shipwrights Review Vista and in anthology. Our Many Longings.

== Personal life ==
Ara moved to Sweden in 1978 and has lived in the university town of Lund since 2007. Apart from writing and painting she works as a language teacher.Her son, Navid, now an architect, lives and works in Malmö. Her daughter, Tania, now a Civil Engineer, lives in Copenhagen. Ara travels to Dhaka frequently, where her mother Professor Chemon Ara still lives in their family home in Banani. Her father Shahed Ali died in 2001.
