= West End High School (Dhaka, Bangladesh) =

Public school in Dhaka, Bangladesh

Location
- Azimpur, Dhaka; Bangladesh; 23.7216°N 90.3854°E

Information
- Type: Public
- Enrollment: 2,000
- Website: wehs.edu.bd

West End High School is a secondary school situated in Azimpur, Dhaka. It was established in 1920. It was the westernmost school of Dhaka at the time, from which fact it got its name.

== Notable people ==
- Abdul Hoque, politician, teacher
- Ahmed Imtiaz Bulbul, musician
- Mahmudul Haque, writer
- Shahid Saber, writer
- Maksud Jamil Mintu , musician
- Happy Akhand, musician
- Khalid Mahmood Mithu ,film director
- Shaikh Ishtiak , musician
- Sarwar Imran , national cricketer
- Kazi Ali Towfik ,lyricist
