= Kakon Bibi =

Bangladeshi militant and secret agent

- কাঁকন বিবি(মুক্তিবেটি)
- Born: Kaket Hanchiata; 1915 (unverified); Other sources give 1927/28 or 1931/32; Meghalaya, India
- Died: 21 March 2018 (age uncertain)
- Awards: Bir Protik
- Military career
- Allegiance: Bangladesh
- Alliance: Mukti Bahini
- Service year: 1971
- Conflicts: Bangladesh liberation war

Noorjahan Kakon Bibi Bir Protik (Bengali: কাঁকন বিবি, Khasi: Kaket Hanchiata) was a Bangladeshi freedom fighter and secret agent of the Bangladesh Liberation War of 1971. She was arrested and brutally tortured by the Pakistani army. She is one of two female freedom fighters honored with the Bir Protik award in 1996, the fourth highest honor in Bangladesh, due to her gallant contribution in the liberation war.

== Personal life ==
Noorjahan Kakon Bibi (originally named Kaket Hennyata, other sources state Kaket Hanchiata) was born in a Khasi family at Nayrai Khasia Palli, Meghalaya, India. Her sister was married to a member of the border guards. She married Shaheed Ali of Derai Upazila in 1970. After her marriage, her name was changed to Noorjahan Begum, but she was mostly known as Kakon Bibi. She gave birth to a daughter, Sakhina, on 16 March 1971. Because of discrimination against girls in India, her husband was displeased, and they got separated. Later she married Abdul Majid Khan, and they had a son who died at birth. Majid was living in the EPR camp, where he also worked. After two months, she brought Sakhina from her previous home. Upon returning, she couldn't find her husband. Hearing that Majid had been transferred to a camp in Dowarabazar Upazila, she went there.

== Liberation war ==
A war was happening in the Dowarabazar area when Kakon went there to search for her husband. She went to Tengratilla camp. The Pakistani Army captured her in a bunker, and she faced inhuman physical and mental torture for many days. She lost hope of finding her husband and joined Muktibahini (the guerrilla resistance movement formed by the Bangladesh military, paramilitary, and civilians during the War of Liberation). Freedom fighter Rahmat Ali introduced her to sector five commander Mir Shawkat Ali. Shawkat called Kakon Bibi his sister of religion. With his influence, she started working as a secret agent under the disguise of a beggar.

In April 1971, Kakon Bibi was captured by the Razakars while spying in Bangla bazar in the region of Dowarabazar Upazila. They tortured her immensely including burning with a hot iron rod. Sexual torture was also intensified. Later, they took her to the Pakistani camp in Tengratilla. There, she told the Pakistani commander that she is the wife of Pakistani soldier Abdul Majid Khan and she came in search of him. The Pakistani commander believed her. Instead, she was proposed to work for the Pakistanis. She agreed and began to help freedom fighters, providing information in a more effective way. This was primarily achieved through receiving an identification card from the Pakistani commander. With that ID card, she started going to the Pakistani camp more often and with greater ease and supplied the freedom fighters with important information.

Later Kakon took part in nearly 20 battlefronts. In November, she was engaged in a front war in Tengratilla, where she was deeply injured. The injury marks were visible on her knee till her death.

== Death ==
Kakon Bibi was hospitalised in 2017 after a heart attack. She died of pneumonia at Sylhet MAG Osmani Medical College and Hospital on 21 March 2018. At the time of her death, Kakon Bibi's age could not be verified. Reports range from 85 or 90 to an age of 103.
