= Iqbal Hossain Chowdhury =

Bangladeshi politician

Minister of Food
- In office 20 December 1988 – 23 December 1989
- Preceded by: Sardar Amjad Hossain
- Succeeded by: Shah Moazzem Hossain

State Minister of Posts, Telecommunications and Information Technology
- In office 27 March 1988 – 10 December 1988
- Preceded by: Mizanur Rahman Chowdhury
- Succeeded by: Kazi Firoz Rashid

Member of Parliament
- In office 3 March 1988 – 6 December 1990
- Preceded by: Himself
- Succeeded by: A. Zahur Miah
- Constituency: Sunamganj-4
- In office 7 May 1986 – 3 March 1988
- Preceded by: Position Established
- Succeeded by: Himself
- Constituency: Sunamganj-4
- In office 18 February 1979 – 24 March 1982
- Preceded by: Abul Hasnat Md. Abdul Hai
- Succeeded by: Imran Ahmad
- Constituency: Sylhet-4

Personal details
- Born: 21 October 1944 Sunamganj District, Sylhet Division, British India (now Bangladesh)
- Died: 20 June 2001 (aged 56) Sunamganj District, Sylhet Division, Bangladesh
- Spouse: Momtaj Iqbal

Military service
- Allegiance: Pakistan (Before 1971); Bangladesh
- Branch/service: Pakistan Army; Bangladesh Army
- Years of service: 1965–1976
- Rank: Major
- Battles/wars: Bangladesh Liberation War

Iqbal Hossain Chowdhury is a Bangladesh Nationalist Party politician and a former member of parliament for Sylhet-4. His wife, Momtaj Iqbal, was also elected a member of parliament.

== Career ==
Chowdhury was elected to parliament from Sylhet-4 as a Bangladesh Nationalist Party candidate in 1979.
