= Chhatak Upazila =

Chhatak ছাতক
- Upazila
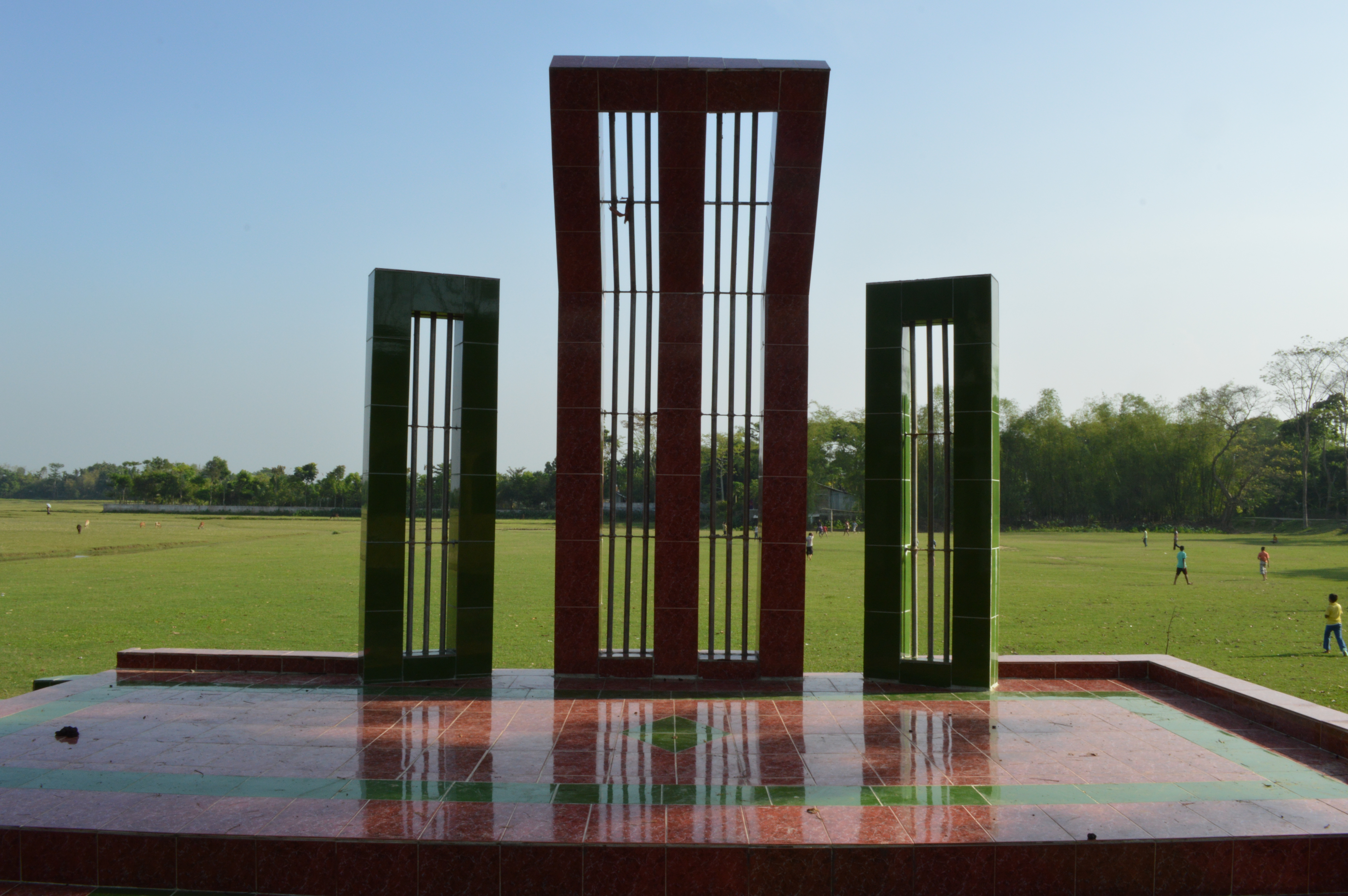
- Shaheed Minar in Haydarpur

- Country: Bangladesh
- Division: Sylhet
- District: Sunamganj
- Headquarters: Chhatak

Government
  - MP (Sunamganj-5): Vacant (ad interim)

Area
  - Total: 434.76 km^{2} (167.86 sq mi)

Population (2022)
  - Total: 445,797
  - Density: 628/km^{2} (1,630/sq mi)
- Demonym(s): Chhataki, Satoki
- Time zone: UTC+6 (BST)
- Postal code: 3080
- Area code: 08723
- Website: chhatak.sunamganj.gov.bd

Chhatak (Bengali: ছাতক) is an upazila of the Sunamganj District in Sylhet Division, Bangladesh. Its headquarters are in the town in Chhatak.

Chhatak Upazila mauza geocode map

== Geography ==
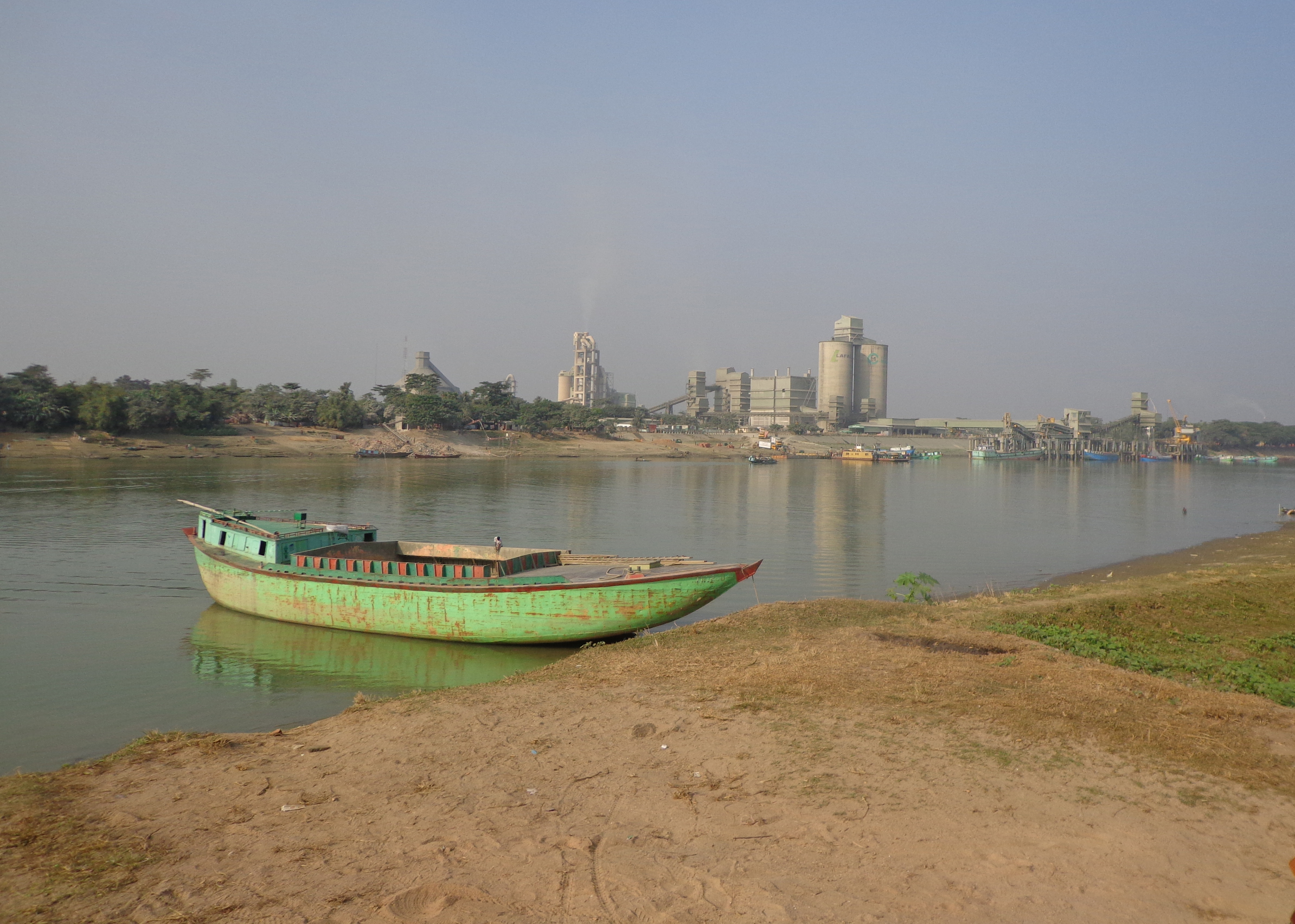
Surma River at Chhatak

Chhatak is located at 25.0417°N 91.6750°E. It has 43,727 households and a total area 434.76 km^{2}.

== Demographics ==
Religions in Chhatak Upazila (2022)
Religion	Percent
Islam	94.76%
Hinduism	5.19%
Other or not stated	0.05%

According to the 2022 Bangladeshi census, Chhatak Upazila had 85,413 households and a population of 445,797. 10.31% of the population were under 5 years of age. Chhatak had a literacy rate (age 7 and over) of 68.09%: 69.95% for males and 66.38% for females, and a sex ratio of 93.36 males for every 100 females. 60,902 (13.66%) lived in urban areas.

According to the 2011 Census of Bangladesh, Chhatak Upazila had 66,724 households and a population of 397,642. 115,129 (28.95%) were under 10 years of age. Chhatak had a literacy rate (age 7 and over) of 38.55%, compared to the national average of 51.8%, and a sex ratio of 1009 females per 1000 males. 50,678 (12.74%) lived in urban areas.

At the time of the 1991 Bangladesh census, Chhatak had a population of 273,153. Males constituted 51.05% of the population and females 48.95%. The adult (18+) population was 135,445. Chhatak had an average literacy rate of 24.5% (7+ years) compared with the national average of 32.4%. Religious affiliation was: Muslim 83.08%, Hindu 16.75%, Buddhist, Christian and others 0.17%.

== Administration ==
Chhatak Upazila is divided into Chhatak Municipality and 13 union parishads: Bhatgaon, Chhaila Afjalabad, Chhatak, Chormoholla, Dolarbazar, Gobindganj-Syedergaon, Islampur, Jauwa Bazar, Kalaruka, Khurma Dakshin, Khurma Uttar, Noarai, and Singchapair. The union parishads are subdivided into 287 mauzas and 539 villages.

Chhatak Municipality is subdivided into 9 wards and 23 mahallas.

== Notable people ==
- Abu Nasr Waheed (1878–1955), Eminent educationist, Islamic scholar, and politician
- Abdul Hoque (1930–1971), Politician and former East Pakistan Provincial Assembly
- Abul Hasnat Md. Abdul Hai (died 2010), Politician and former Member of the Bangladesh Parliament
- Durbin Shah (1921–1977), Singer and songwriter
- Kalim Uddin Ahmed (born 1958), Politician and Member of the Bangladesh Parliament
- Mohibur Rahman Manik (born 1962), Politician and former Member of the Bangladesh Parliament

== See also ==
- Chhatak
- Upazilas of Bangladesh
- Districts of Bangladesh
- Divisions of Bangladesh
- Khola Gaon
- Mahammedpur
- Jhigli
- Haydor Pur
