= Mohammad Sadique =

Bangladeshi politician and writer

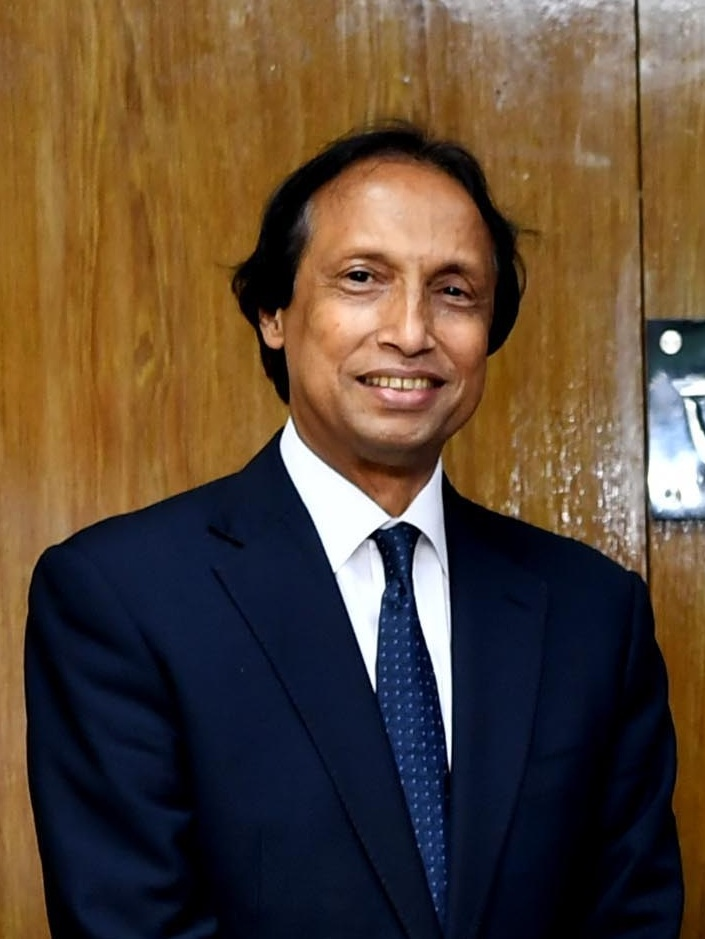

Member of the Bangladesh Parliament for Sunamganj-4
- In office 30 January 2024 – 6 August 2024
- Preceded by: Pir Fazlur Rahman

13th Chairman of Bangladesh Public Service Commission
- In office 2 May 2016 – 16 September 2020
- Preceded by: Ikram Ahmed
- Succeeded by: Md Sohorab Hossain

Personal details
- Born: 19 September 1955 (age 71) Sunamganj District, East Bengal, Dominion of Pakistan
- Party: Bangladesh Awami League
- Spouse: Jesmin Ara Begum
- Education: University of Dhaka

Muhammed Sadique (born 1955) is a Bangladeshi retired government official, politician, writer, and a former Jatiya Sangsad member representing the Sunamganj-4 constituency. He previously served as the 13th chairman of Bangladesh Public Service Commission. He was awarded Bangla Academy Literary Award in 2017 for his contributions to Bengali poetry.

== Biography ==
Sadique was born in September 1955 at Dharargaon village of Sunamganj District. His father's name is Alhajj Mohammad Mubasshir Ali and mother's name is Mastura Begum.

Sadique received his bachelor's degree in Bengali language and literature in 1976 and his master's in 1977. He did research on Sylheti Nagri script and received his Ph.D. from Assam University in 2005. He joined the Bangladesh Civil Service in 1982.

As a member of Bangladesh Civil Service, Sadique served as Additional Secretary of Ministry of Public Administration, Director General of the Bangladesh Institute of Administration and Management Foundation, and Director and Acting Director General of the Bangladesh Civil Service Administration Academy. He served as the Secretary of Ministry of Education and the Bangladesh Election Commission, respectively.

Sadique has served as a member of Bangladesh Public Service Commission since 3 November 2014 and appointed as the chairman of the commission on 2 May 2016. On 16 September 2020, he was replaced by Md Sohorab Hossain.

Sadique is a lifetime member of Asiatic Society of Bangladesh and a fellow of Bangla Academy. He was elected to parliament from Sunamganj-4 as an Awami League candidate on 7 January 2024.

After the fall of the Sheikh Hasina led Awami League government, a murder case was filed against Sadique by Bangladesh Nationalist Party politician Mohammad Zaman Hossain Khan over the death of a protestor in July 2024.

== Literature works ==
- Agune Rekhechi Haat (1985)
- Trikaaler Shwaralipi (1987)
- Binidro Bollom Haate Shomudrer Shobdo Shuni (1991)
- Ke Loibo Khobor (2010)
- Nirbachito Kobita (2005)
- Shofat Shaher Laathi (2017)
- Kobi Radharomon Datta: Shohojiar Jotil Jamiti (2017)
- Nei Ar Nilakaash, Translated from No Longer at Ease (1960) by Chinua Achebe
