= Durbin Shah =

Mystical Poet and Baul Durbin Shah
- দুর্বিন শাহ
- Born: 2 November 1920; Nowarai, Sunamganj, Sylhet, British India (Now Bangladesh)
- Died: 15 February 1977 (aged 56); Chhatak Upazila, Sunamganj district, Bangladesh
- Citizenship: British India (1920-1947) Pakistan (1947-1971) Bangladesh (1971-1977)
- Occupations: Singer; songwriter

Durbin Shah (Bengali: দুর্বিন শাহ) was a Bangladeshi mystic lyric poet and one of the most knowledgeable commentators on Bengali folk literature, Baulsadhak.

== Biography ==
He was born on 2 November 1920 (15 Kartika 1327) at Taramani Tila in Nowarai village in Chatak, north of the Surma river. In Kalanta, this Taramani Tila is known as Durveen Tila. Safat Ali Shah, his father, was a Sufi saint, and Hasina Banu, his mother, was a Pirani. As a result, he was raised in a musical family. His father died when he was only seven years old. In 1946, he married Surfa Begum.

== Music life ==
Sufism and mysticism are prominent in most of his songs, but he also wrote numerous songs in a variety of moods. These songs are classified as Baul, Bichhed, Regional, Mass Music, Maljora, Jari, Sari, Bhatiali, Gostha, Milon, Radha-Krishna Padavali, Hamad-Naat, Marfati, Pir-Murshid Samar Ala Samar, Nabi Samar, Oli Samar, and others. It is divided into sections such as devotional songs, mental education, Sufism, Dehatattattva, Kamattattva, Nigudattattva, Parghatattattva, and country songs. Furthermore, various titles written by him can be identified under different titles. In 1967, he travelled to England at the invitation of expatriate Bengalis. The only tour companion was Baulsadhak Shah Abdul Karim, who was enthralled by his lyrics and melody, and music lovers renamed him the 'Sea of Knowledge'.

Some of the notable songs composed by him are-

- Bela Gelo Sondha Hoilo
- Nobi Amar Ashekeri Tori
- Namaj Amar Hoilo Na Aday
- Nirjana Jamunar Kule Bosiya Kadambatale
- Amar Antaray Amar Kalija
- Naba Jaubane Asharh Mase
- Paradeshire Dur Bideshe Ghar
- Kripasindhu Deenbandhu Namati Tomar Sansare
- Ami Janme Janme Aparadhi Tomari Charane Re

Durbin Shah, a Baul sadhak, wrote the song "Namaaj Amar Hoil Na Aadiya," which Ritwik Ghatak, a prominent filmmaker from Kolkata, used in his 1974 film Jukti Takko Aar Gappo . The book "Durbin Shah Samgar," edited by folk literature specialist Sumankumar Das from Dhaka's original publication, has all of Durbin's works.

== Death ==
On 15 February 1977, at his residence (on 3 Falgun, 1383 B), he died at the age of 57.

== Works and books ==
- Premsagar Palligiti Volume I (1950)
- Premsagar Palligiti Volume II (1950)
- Premsagar Palligiti Volume III (1968)
- Premsagar Palligiti Volume IV (1968)
- Premsagar Palligiti Volume V (1973)
- Pak Banga Bhagya Samtam Giti (1970)
- The Complete Durbin Shah (Edited by Sumankumar Das) (2010)
