= Shahed Ali (writer) =

Bangladeshi litterateur and cultural activist

- শাহেদ আলী
- Born: 24 May 1925; Mahmudpur, Assam Province, British India
- Died: 7 November 2001 (aged 76)
- Education: Jubilee High School (1943); Murari Chand College (1947); University of Dhaka (M.A. 1950)
- Occupations: Journalist, activist, Islamic thinker
- Spouse: Cheman Ara
- Children: Three sons and three daughters, including Dilruba Z. Ara
- Awards: Bangla Academy Literary Award (1964); Ekushey Padak (1989); Islamic Foundation Award (1986); Kishor Kantha Literature Award (post-humous, 2003)

Shahed Ali (Bengali: শাহেদ আলী; 24 May 1925 – 6 November 2001) was a Bangladeshi litterateur and cultural activist. Aside from being an educationist and his journalism, he was one of the founders of the nationwide Tamaddun Majlish which initiated the Bengali language movement. He edited multiple magazines, was the founding secretary of the Islamic Academy (now Islamic Foundation Bangladesh), and is best known for his magnum opus, the short story Jibrailer Dana (Gabriel's Wings).

== Early life and education ==
Ali was born in the village of Mahmudpur (presently in South Sripur Union) in Tahirpur Thana, Sunamganj Subdivision, Sylhet District to Bengali Muslim parents on 24 May 1925. He was the oldest of nine brothers and sisters. His first story, Ashru (Tears), was published in 1940 when he was a student at grade eight. In 1943, he completed his studies at the Government Jubilee High School and proceeded to study at the Murari Chand College in Sylhet. He received his bachelor's degree in 1947, and did a Master of Arts in Bengali language and literature from the University of Dhaka which he completed in 1950.

== Career ==
In 1951, Ali began teaching at the Azizul Haque College in Bogra. After that, he served at the Mirpur Bangla College in Dhaka, Carmichael College in Rangpur and the Government City College, Chittagong until 1954. He was linked to several activities during the Bengali language movement between 1948 and 1952, as the general secretary of the Tamaddun Majlish, later becoming its president.

Aside from teaching, Ali had been an editor of the "Prabhati" monthly from 1944 to 1966. He later became involved with the "Sainik" magazine, which served as the banner for the Bengali language movement. He worked as the editor of Saynik from 1948 to 1950. In 1955, he was an editor of the "Daily Buniyad" and the following year, he was the assistant editor of the "Daily Millat". As the founding secretary of the Islamic Academy, he edited the Academy's two journals; children's monthly "Sabuz Pata" (1963-1982) and the Islamic Academy Magazine. From 1962 to 1982, he served as the director of the Academy's translation and compilation department. He was also actively involved with Allama Iqbal Society Magazine from 1963 to 1982.

In 1954, he was elected as the Member of the Legislative Assembly for the Government of East Pakistan in 1954, representing the Khelafat-e-Rabbani Party at Sunamganj. He decided to quit politics when Ayub Khan imposed martial law in 1958. From 1963 to 1964, he served as a member of the Bangla Academy Magazine Editing Board. He was also a member of the Islami Bishwakosh Editing Board. He has led numerous intellectual and cultural movements.

== List of works ==
Some of his most famous short stories:

- Jibrailer Dana (Gabriel's Wings)
- Eki Shomotole (On the same plane)[Included in the University Curriculum]
- Shah Nazar (a bridegroom's vision)
- Amar Kahini (Ageless story)
- Natun Zamindar (The new landlord)

Works he translated into Bengali:

- Herodotus
- Road to Mecca - Muhammad Asad
- Fundamentals of Economics
- History of political theory
- Islam in Bangladesh
- Economic order of Islam
- Modern Science and Modern People's history

== Awards ==
- Bangla Academy Literary Award (1964)
- Ekushey Padak (1989)
- Tamgha I Imtiaz (1969)
- Language movement Award (1981)
- Nasiruddin Gold medal (1985)
- Islamic Foundation Award (1986)
- Jallalabad Club Award (1988)
- Jallalabad Club Forum February 21 and independence award (1990)
- Bangladesh National student award (England) (1991)
- Bangladesh Islamic School (Dubai) literature award (1992)
- Poet Forrukah Memorial Award (1997)
- Ragib Rabeya Shitta award (1998)
