= Jhigli =

Coordinates: 24°50′12″N 91°35′14″E

Jhigly ঝিগলী
- Village
- Location of Jhigli in Bangladesh
- Country: Bangladesh
- Division: Sylhet
- District: Sunamganj
- Upazila: Chhatak
- Union: Bhatgaon
- Time zone: UTC+6 (BST)
- Website: www.bhatgaonup.sunamganj.gov.bd

Jhigly (Bengali: ঝিগলী) is a village located in Bhatgaon Union of Chhatak Upazila in Sunamganj District within the division of Sylhet, Bangladesh.

== Geography ==
Jhigly is located in the southern part of Chhatak Upazila. Nearby villages are Muhammadpur, 3.4 kilometres (2.1 mi) south-east; Jahirpur, 4.3 kilometres (2.7 mi) north-west; Satgaon, 5.6 kilometres (3.5 mi); Jahedpur, 4.3 kilometres (2.7 mi); and Bagain, 7.6 kilometres (4.7 mi) north-east.

== Education ==
Notable educational institutions of Jhigly are as follows:

- Jamea Islamia aravia jhigly
- Bade-Jhigly Primary School
- Sulaimanpur Primary School
- Jhigly High School
- Jhigly Hafizia Madrasa
- Jhigly College
- Jhigly khadijatul kubra mohila madrasah

== See also ==
- List of villages in Bangladesh
