= Khola Gaon =

Khola Gaon (Bengali: খোলা গাঁও) is a village in Chhaila Afjalabad Union under Chhatak Upazila of Sunamganj District, Bangladesh.

== Geography ==
The village lies on both sides of the Dahuka River, a tributary of the Surma River. Adjacent to Khola Gaon are the villages of Dosh Ghor (north-side), Binodpur, Borsal, Bangla Bazaar (east-side), Saila (south-side) and Bargoin (west-side).

== Demographics ==
According to the 2011 Bangladesh census, Khalagaon had 82 households and a population of 424. 10.8% of the population was under the age of 5. The literacy rate (age 7 and over) was 57.1%, compared to the national average of 51.8%.

== Education ==
The nearest secondary school is Bangla Bazaar High School, about 1 kilometre (0.62 mi) northeast of the village.
