= Mohammad Nasir Ali =

Bangladeshi author

Mohammad Nasir Ali was a Bangladeshi author and publisher known for his children books.

== Early life ==
Ali was born on 10 January 1910 in Bikrampur, Munshiganj District, Dhaka, East Bengal, British India. He finished High School at the Telirbagh Kalimohan-Durgamohan Institution. he graduated from the University of Dhaka in 1931 with a B.Com. degree.

== Career ==
Ali moved to Kolkata in search of work and started working as a translator at the Calcutta High Court. He worked on the Children's section of the Daily Ittefaq from 1946 to 1948. He moved to Dhaka following the partition of India. He founded Naoroze Kitabistan publishing house in 1949. He joined the Dhaka High Court and worked there till 1967. In 1967, he was awarded the Bangla Academy Award in Literature and next year, he was awarded the UNESCO Prize and United Bank of Pakistan Prize. He was in charge of Mukuler Mahfil, the Children's section, of The Azad from 1952 to 1975. He often published his works using the pseudonym 'Bagban'.

== Publications ==
- Amader Quaid-i-Azam (1948)
- Manikanika (1949)
- Shahi Diner Kahini (1949)
- Chhotader Omar Faruq (1951)
- Akash Yara Karlo Jay (1957)
- Ali Baba (1958)
- Tolstoyer Sera Galpa (1963)
- Italyr Janak Garibaldi (1963)
- Birbaler Khosh Galpa (1964)
- Sat Panch Galpa (1965)
- Boka Bakai (1966)
- Yogayog (1968)
- Lebu Mamar Saptakanda (1968)
- Bhindeshi Ek Birbal (1970)
- Barasho Banarer Pallay (1976)
- Albert Einstein (1976)
- Mrtyur Sathe Panja (1976)
- Bobara Sab Kalo (1982)

== Death ==
Ali died on 30 January 1975 in Dhaka, Bangladesh.
