= Dowarabazar Upazila =

Dowarabazar দোয়ারাবাজার
- Upazila
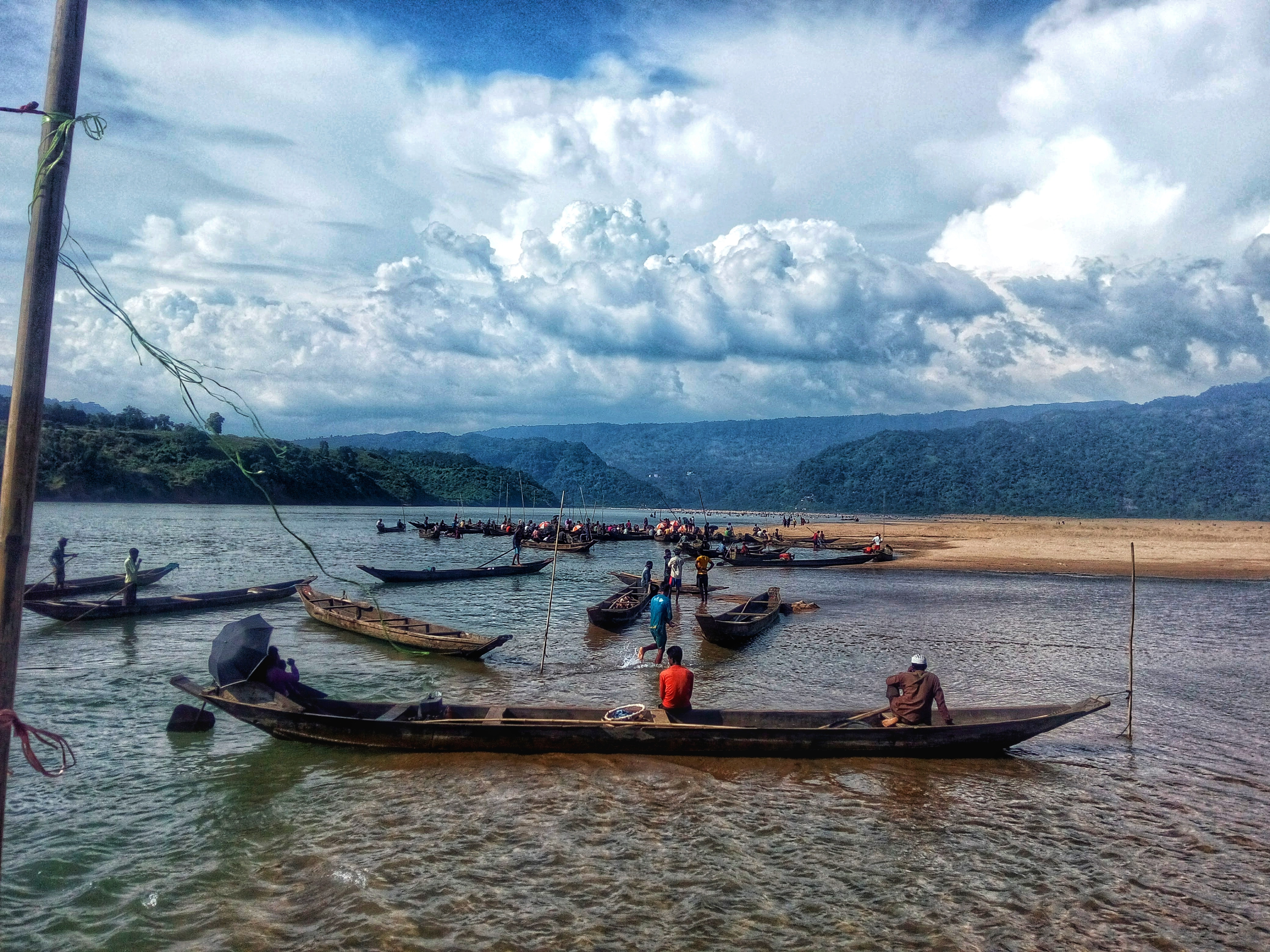
- Jadukata river at Dowarabazar

- Country: Bangladesh
- Division: Sylhet
- District: Sunamganj
- Established: 1976

Government
  - MP (Sunamganj-5): Vacant (ad interim)

Area
  - Total: 263.35 km^{2} (101.68 sq mi)

Population (2022)
  - Total: 260,513
  - Density: 989.23/km^{2} (2,562.1/sq mi)
- Demonym(s): Dowarabazari, Duarabazari
- Time zone: UTC+6 (BST)
- Postal code: 3070
- Website: www.dowarabazar.sunamganj.gov.bd

Dowarabazar (Bengali: দোয়ারাবাজার, is an upazila of Sunamganj District in the Division of Sylhet, Bangladesh.

Dowarabazar Upazila mauza geocode map

== Geography ==
Dowarabazar is located at 25.0500°N 91.5667°E. It has 42,693 households and total area 263.35 km^{2} and bounded by the Indian state of Meghalaya and border on the north, and Chhatak Upazila on the south and east, Sunamganj Sadar Upazila on the west. Main rivers are Surma, Jadukata etc.

== Demographics ==
Religions in Dowarabazar Upazila (2022)
Religion	Percent
Islam	95.80%
Hinduism	4.11%
Other or not stated	0.09%

According to the 2022 Bangladeshi census, Dowarabazar Upazila had 51,853 households and a population of 260,513. 12.14% of the population were under 5 years of age. Dowarabazar had a literacy rate (age 7 and over) of 64.78%: 65.69% for males and 63.98% for females, and a sex ratio of 91.26 males for every 100 females. 31,011 (11.90%) lived in urban areas.

According to the 2011 Census of Bangladesh, Dowarabazar Upazila had 42,693 households and a population of 228,460. 72,682 (31.81%) were under 10 years of age. Dowarabazar had a literacy rate (age 7 and over) of 30.38%, compared to the national average of 51.8%, and a sex ratio of 1035 females per 1000 males. 14,794 (6.48%) lived in urban areas.

== Administration ==
Dowarabazar Upazila is divided into nine union parishads: Bangla Bazar, Bouglabazar, Dohalia, Dowarabazar, Laxmipur, Mannargaon, Norsingpur, Pandargaon, and Surma. The union parishads are subdivided into 151 mauzas and 308 villages.

Dowarabazar Model Govt Primary School, Dowarabazar High School and Dowarabazar Degree College is situated in Dowarabazar town.

== Notable residents ==
- Dewan Mohammad Azraf, teacher, author, politician, journalist and philosopher
- Abdul Mazid, freedom fighter, Member of Bangladesh Parliament
- Kakon Bibi, Bangladeshi freedom fighter, Bir Protik

== See also ==
- Upazilas of Bangladesh
- Districts of Bangladesh
- Divisions of Bangladesh
