= Abdullah Hel Kafi =

Abdullah Hel Kafi was a Pakistani Bengali politician and Islamist.

== Early life ==
Kafi was born in 1900 at Tubgram village in Burdwan district, Bengal Presidency, British India.

== Career ==
Kafi served as the editor of The Daily Jamana. From 1922 to 1925, he also worked co-editor of Jamayat-i-Ulama-i-Bangla. He worked with Maulana Abul Kalam Azad and Mohammad Akram Khan at Jamayat-i-Ulama-i-Bangla. He served as the secretary of the Independent Muslim Party led Huseyn Shaheed Suhrawardy in 1926. The same year he worked in the Election Board as a member. In 1927, he was imprisoned by the British Raj for working against the British rule of India. In 1930 he was involved with the Civil Disobedience program in Dinajpur District. In 1932, he started his career as an Islamist activist.

Kafi participated in the All India Azad Muslim Conference and All India Ahle Hadith conference. He was elected Chairman of All Bengal and Asam Jamayate Ahle Hadith in Rangpur in 1945. He propagated Hadith movement and established Madrasahs in different parts of Bengal. He created the All Party Islami Front. He worked as the editor of The Daily Arafat. He was awarded the Bangla Academy Literature Award in 1960.

== Death ==
Kafi died in 1960.
