= Abul Hussain =

Bangladeshi poet (1922–2014)

- আবুল হোসেন
- Born: 15 August 1922; Khulna, Bengal Presidency, British India
- Died: 29 June 2014 (aged 91); Dhaka, Bangladesh
- Education: MA (economics) from Calcutta University
- Awards: full list

Abul Hussain (15 August 1922 – 29 June 2014) was a Bangladeshi poet. He was awarded Ekushey Padak in 1980 and Bangla Academy Literary Award in 1963.

== Early life ==
Hussain's first poetry book published in 1940. He has over 30 books including Birosh Shonglap (1969) and Hawa Tomarkee Dushahosh (1982). He obtained a Master's in Economics from Calcutta University and served as the editor of the Rabindra Parishad of Presidency College.

== Career ==
His father SM Ismail Hossain worked in the police department. He was killed by the Pakistani army during the war of independence . Abul Hossain studied at Krishnanagar Collegiate School, Kushtia High School, Calcutta Presidency College and Calcutta University.

In 1940, Abul Hossain's first book of poetry 'Nabbasanta' was published. His published books of poetry include - 'Biras Sanlap', 'Hawa Tomar Ki Duhsahas', 'Dusvapna To Dusvaspne', 'Ajon Aaye Hai', 'R Kiser Apeka', 'Rajkahini' etc. He has written two memoir books, 'My Little World' and 'Another World'. ‘Call of the Forest’ is his translated novel. He also wrote a travelogue called 'On the way to the hills'.

Abul Hossain was employed in government service. He later retired and was associated with Bardem Hospital.

== Awards ==
Poet Abul Hossain Ekushey Padak, Bangla Academy Literary Award, National Poetry Award, Nasiruddin Gold Medal, Poetry Award, Kazi Mahbubullah Award and gold medal, Abul Hasanat Sahitya Award, Janabarta Gold Medal, Bangiya Sahitya Parishad Award.

== Literary works ==
=== Poems ===
- Naba-Basanta
- Birash Sanglap (1969)
- Duswapna Theke Duswapne (1985)
- Haoa Tomar Kee Dussahos (1982)
- Ekhono Somoy Ache (1997)
- Aar Kisher Opekkha (2000)
- Kaler Khatae (2008)

== Awards ==
- Bangla Academy Literary Award (1963)
- Nasiruddin Gold Medal
- Ekushey Padak (1980)
