= Dolarbazar Union =

Administrative unit in Bangladesh

Dolarbazar Union দোলারবাজার ইউনিয়ন Dularbazar, Dolar Bazar, Dular Bazar
- Union Council Ukil Ali Mohamed pur American bari P.O. Jahid pur
- No. 10 Dolarbazar Union Council
- Location in Bangladesh
- Country: Bangladesh
- Division: Sylhet Division
- District: Sunamganj District
- Upazila: Chhatak Upazila

Government
  - Union Parishad Chairman: Muhammad Shayesta Miah Moinpuri

Population
  - Total: 32,150
- Demonym: Dolarbazari
- Time zone: UTC+6 (BST)
- Website: dolarbazarup.sunamganj.gov.bd

Dolarbazar Union (Bengali: দোলারবাজার ইউনিয়ন) is a Union Parishad under Chhatak Upazila of Sunamganj District in the division of Sylhet, Bangladesh. It has an area of 24.7 square kilometres and a population of 32,150.

== History ==
Suf saint Ahsan Shah came to this area and is now buried in Moinpur.

The 20th century was an important part for Dolarbazar's development. In 1903, its first government primary school opened in Moinpur. In 1940, the Moinpur Eidgah was established. A decade later, the Golal Ratiya graveyard was created serving the local community. In 1994, the Janata Degree College opened in Moinpur. The union council office building was established on 7 January 2006.

== Geography ==
Dolarbazar Union is located in the Chhatak Upazila. It borders Chhaila Afjalabad Union in the east, Singchapair Union in the west, North Khurma Union and Gobindganj Syedergaon in the north and Jagannathpur Upazila in the south. It has an area of 24.7 square kilometres.

== Demography ==
Dolarbazar has a population of 32,150.

== Administration ==
Dolarbazar constitutes the no. 10 union council of Chhatak Upazila. It contains 51 villages and 28 mouzas.

=== Villages ===
The villages are divided into 9 wards, each with a representative. They are as follows:

- Ward 1 (Giash Uddin Moinpuri): Amajastipur, Kursi, Chowkh Isabpur, Chankhar Bagoin, Chhaila, Durgapur, Moinpur, Shashon
- Ward 2 (Tajud Miah Katasholi): Katashola, Rauli
- Ward 3 (Shafiq Miah Southern Kursi): North Kursi, South Kursi
- Ward 4 (Abul Khayr Jahedpuri): Chanpur, Chelarchor, Jahedpur, Sherpur
- Ward 5 (Fayzur Rahman Muhammadpuri): Alampur, Chowkh Krishnapur, Khaghata, Gopinathpur, Chichhorauli, Talebpur, Doshpaika, Bubrajan, Buraiya, Bhaowa, Muhammadpur, Rampur
- Ward 6 (Salik Miah Chowdhury Eastern Boshontopuri): Gobindpur, Talupat, Dilalpur, Narsinghpur, Boshontopur, Jugolnogor, Srikrishnapur
- Ward 7 (Arif Ahmad Zamir Barogopi): Kollanpur, Barogopi
- Ward 8 (Hafiz Abdul Jalil Palpuri): Ekakamai, Gopalpur, Joti, Janaiya, Jomshorpur, Palpur, Lakshmipasha, Sulaymanpur
- Ward 9 (Abdul Hashim Mukhtarpuri): Nomshapur, Bademuktarpur, Bahubali, Muktarpur, Rampur

=== List of chairmen ===
List of chairmen
Number	Name	Term	Notes
01	Momashir Ali	1962 - 29/5/1972	
02	Iqbal Husayn	30/5/1972	As District Magistrate
03	Mukhlisur Rahman	14/10/1972	
04	Abdus Subhan	20/3/1974	
05	Firdaws Ali	21/5/1975	In-charge
06	Abdul Bari	3/8/1976-3/8/1980	
07	Mafiz Ali	22/5/1983	In-charge
08	Shajur Ali	22/5/1984-3/4/1988	
09	Abdul Mumin Mashuq Miah	25/5/1992	
10	Azizul Islam Aziz	11/3/1998	
11	Shah Abdul Ghani	2/3/2004	Sunamganj District Chairman of the Year (2003-2004)
12	Mutassir Ali	24/5/2009	In-charge
13	Alhaj Abdul Matin	3/2/2011	Panel Chairman
14	Shah Abdul Ghani	14/8/2011	
15	Muhammad Shayesta Miah	Present	

== Economy and tourism ==
Dolarbazar has a significant number of British and American immigrants contributing to its economy. It has eight Haat bazaars. They are as follows:

1. Moinpur Bazar
2. Dolar Bazar
3. Kursi Bazar
4. Alampur Bazar
5. Jahedpur Old Bazar
6. Jahedpur New Bazar
7. Buraiya Bazar
8. Palpur Point

== Education ==
The Union has a literacy rate of 35%. It has 18 primary schools and 3 high schools. There are six madrasas (including one Kamil madrasa).

== Language and culture ==
The native population converse in their native Sylheti dialect but can also converse in Standard Bengali. Languages such as Arabic and English are also taught in schools. The Union contains 51 mosques and 9 eidgahs. They are as follows:

1. Moinpur Central Jame Masjid and Eidgah
2. Katashola Jame Masjid
3. Rauli Jame Masjid
4. Kursi Jame Masjid
5. Chelarchor Jame Masjid
6. Jahedpur Jame Masjid
7. Chanpur Jame Masjid
8. Buraiya Jame Masjid
9. Khaghata Jame Masjid
10. Jugolnogor Jame Masjid
11. Dolarbazar Jame Masjid
12. Kollanpur Jame Masjid
13. Palpur Jame Masjid
14. Muktarpur Jame Masjid
15. Rampur Jame Masjid

=== Sports ===
Moinpur, Palpur, Jahedpur and Buraiya each have their own football clubs.
