= Ali Monsur =

Bangladeshi actor, storyteller, screenwriter, producer and director

- আলী মনসুর

Personal details
- Born: 23 December 1923 24 Parganas, Bengal Presidency, British India।
- Died: 4 November 2002 (aged 78) Dhaka
- Spouse: Rafia Monsur
- Education: City College, Kolkata, Ashutosh College
- Awards: Ekushey Padak -1994, Nigar Award, Bangla Academy Award -1969

Ali Monsur (23 December 1923 – 4 November 2002) Bangladeshi actor, storyteller, screenwriter, producer and director. He was awarded the Nigar Award as the best filmmaker of Pakistan at that time, the Bangla Academy Award in 1969 and the Ekushey Padak in 1994 for his special contribution to theater.

== Early life ==
Monsur was born on 23 December 1923 at 24 Parganas of West Bengal of British India. Born from Mohammad Khorshed Ali and Anjuman Ara Begum, he was the eldest of four brothers and three sisters. His younger brother Kawser Ali was an actor and film-director. His wife Rafia Monsur was a dancer and dance-director. He passed B.Com. from City College, Kolkata on 1942. Later he continued study in Ashutosh College of Kolkata.

== Work ==
Monsur started writing at magazines and newspapers during his studies at Ashutosh College. On 1943 the drama, ‘Porobari’, written by him was staged at rongmohol, which was directed by renowned film director K.D. Babu. Renowned signer Hemanta Mukhargee sang in this drama too. He joined as theatre artist, announcer and news presenter at Dhaka Betar later. Alongside his job he was assosicated with drama-theatres too. He was writing dramas, directing and acting. Monsur was one of the actors in the first Bangla 'Talkies' Mukh O Mukhosh directed by Abdul Jabbar Khan, this was released on 3 August 1956. He acted in more than 50 films among which are Gazi Kalu Champabati, Nabab Sirajuddaula, Raja Sannasi, Bhai Bon. Monsur produced and directed films too. He was the director for the films Mohua and Janajani.

== Awards and honors ==
- Nigar Awards
- Ekushey Padak -1994
- Bangla Academy Literary Award -1969

== Death ==
Ali Monsur died in Dhaka on 4 November 2002.
