= A. Zahur Miah =

Bangladeshi politician

Abduz Zahur Miah
- আবদুজ জহূর মিঞা

Member of 5th Jatiya Sangsad
- In office 1991–1996
- Preceded by: Iqbal Hossain Chowdhury
- Succeeded by: Fazlul Haque Aspia
- Constituency: Sunamganj-4

Member of East Pakistan Provincial Assembly
- In office 1970–1970
- Constituency: Sylhet-5

Personal details
- Born: 10 November 1925 Binnakuli, Sunamganj, British Raj
- Died: May 22, 2007 (aged 81) Bangladesh
- Party: Awami League
- Education: University of Dacca; Murari Chand College; Jubilee High School

Abduz Zahur Miah (Bengali: আবদুজ জহূর মিঞা; 10 November 1925 – 22 May 2007) was a Bangladeshi politician and teacher. He was the former member of parliament for Sunamganj-4.

== Early life and education ==
Abduz Zahur was born on 10 November 1925 to a Bengali family of Muslim Taluqdars in the village of Binnakuli in Tahirpur, Sunamganj subdivision, Sylhet district, British Raj (now Bangladesh). He was the third among the seven children of Thakur Dhan Talukder and Amena Begum. Abduz Zahur was admitted in the second class of Rajargaon Primary School in 1936. In 1938, he was admitted in the third class of Gourarang Middle English School. After studying there for four years, he passed the first section of the secondary scholarship examination. He was later admitted in the seventh class of Jubilee High School and after matriculation from there he obtained BA degree from Murari Chand College in 1952. He then enrolled in the law department of the University of Dacca for higher studies.

== Career ==
Abduz Zahur played an active role in the anti-British movement. In 1948 he was elected president of the Sunamganj subdivision Muslim Students Federation. He later joined the Democratic Party. He was involved in the language movement in 1952. He played an active role in the 1954 United Front elections. He joined the Awami League in 1969. He joined Satgaon High School as a teacher from 1959 to 1971 and served as the headmaster. In the 1970 election (Sunamganj North and Tahirpur) he was elected a member of the East Pakistan Provincial Assembly.

He took active part in the Bangladesh Liberation War in 1971. Miah was elected to parliament from Sunamganj-4 as an Awami League candidate in 1991.

== Personal life ==
He married in 1959 to Begum Rahima Zahur, daughter of Mohammad Hussain Talukder of Baradal village in Tahirpur, Sunamganj. Fatema Chowdhury Swapna, the eldest of their six sons and daughters, is currently living in America, then Nazma Begum, she is also currently living in America, the third is Advocate Rita Begum. Son Junaid Ahmed, now in business Sunamganj, Sultana Razia Nita and Pabel Ahmed are currently expatriates in America.

== Death ==
He died on 22 May 2007.
