= Momtaj Iqbal =

Bangladeshi politician

Member of Bangladesh Parliament

Personal details
- Party: Jatiya Party (Ershad)

Momtaj Iqbal is a Jatiya Party (Ershad) politician and a former member of parliament for Sunamganj-4. She was married to Major (retired) Iqbal Hossain Chowdhury, former Jatiya Party minister.

== Career ==
Iqbal was elected to parliament from Sunamganj-4 as a Jatiya Party candidate in 2008.

== Death ==
Iqbal died on 17 April 2009.
