= Sunamganj Sadar Upazila =

Sunamganj Sadar সুনামগঞ্জ সদর
- Upazila
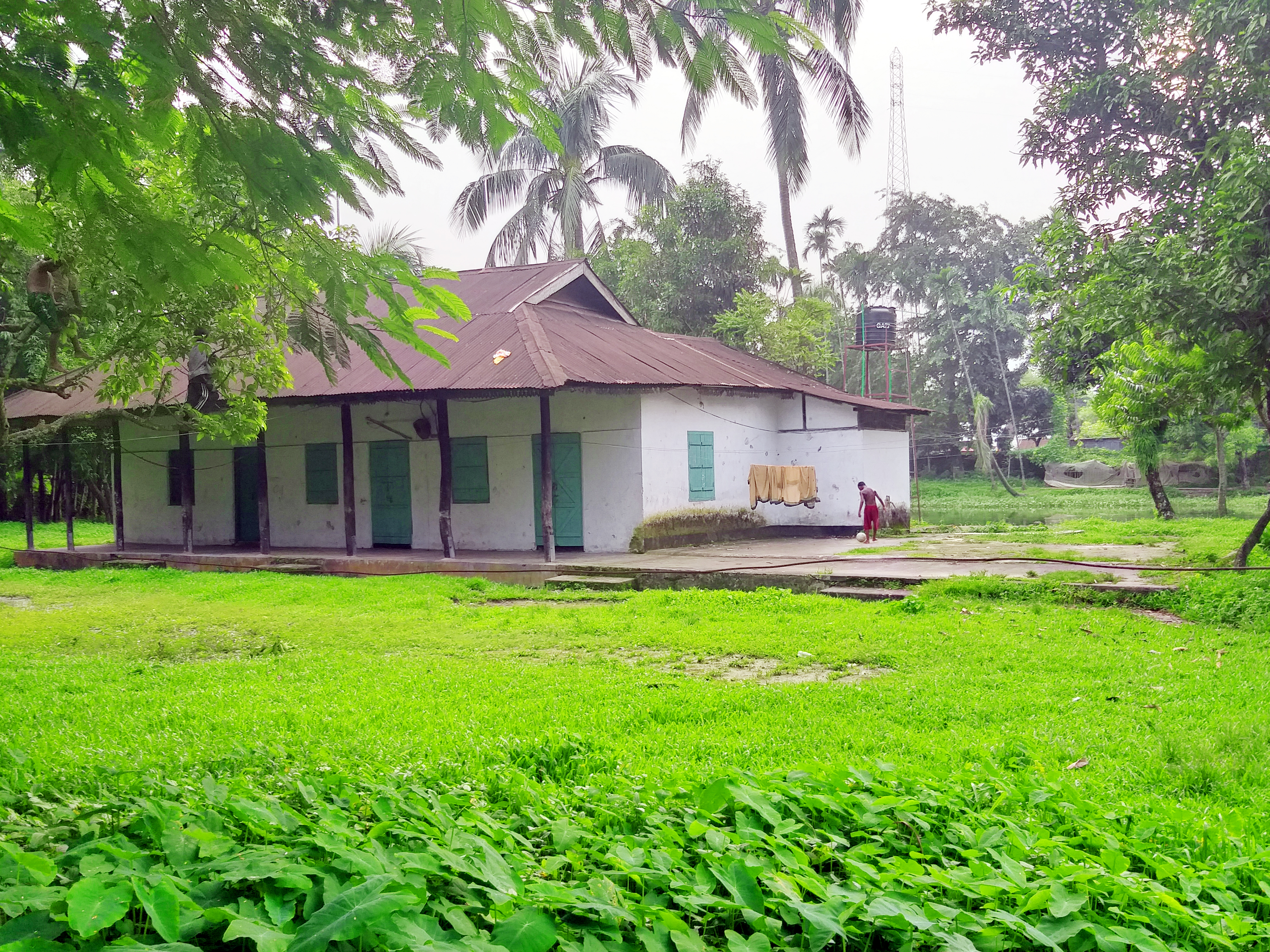
- House of Hason Raja in Sunamganj

- Coordinates: 25°04′N 91°24′E
- Country: Bangladesh
- Division: Sylhet
- District: Sunamganj
- Headquarters: Sunamganj

Area
  - Total: 290.71 km^{2} (112.24 sq mi)

Population (2022)
  - Total: 318,099
  - Density: 1,094.2/km^{2} (2,834.0/sq mi)
- Demonym(s): Sunamganji, Shunamgonji, Shunamgoinji, Sunamgonji
- Time zone: UTC+6 (BST)
- Postal code: 3000
- Area code: 0871
- Website: www.sadar.sunamganj.gov.bd

Sunamganj Sadar (Bengali: সুনামগঞ্জ সদর), is an upazila of Sunamganj District in Sylhet Division, Bangladesh.

Sunamganj Sadar Upazila mauza geocode map

== Geography ==
Sunamganj Sadar is located at 25°04′N 91°24′E. Geographically, it is situated on the northeastern part of Bangladesh. It has 49,557 households and total area 290.71 km^{2}. It is the meeting place of three different upazilas. Also It is placed near the bank of the Surma which is the longest river of Bangladesh. This area has mineral resources like natural gas, mineral oil, raw material for industries, crops, fish and so on. "Tanguar haor" has been included the world heritage site which has thousand species of bird, fish, reptiles and so on are living together. Every year, Bangladeshis and foreign tourists, researchers, environmentalists visit the area.

== Demographics ==
Religions in Sunamganj Sadar Upazila (2022)
Religion	Percent
Islam	90.67%
Hinduism	9.13%
Other or not stated	0.20%

According to the 2022 Bangladeshi census, Sunamganj Sadar Upazila had 63,303 households and a population of 318,099. 10.95% of the population were under 5 years of age. Sunamganj Sadar had a literacy rate (age 7 and over) of 67.99%: 69.65% for males and 66.39% for females, and a sex ratio of 97.38 males for every 100 females. 92,389 (29.04%) lived in urban areas.

According to the 2011 Census of Bangladesh, Sunamganj Sadar Upazila had 49,557 households and a population of 279,019. 82,022 (29.40%) were under 10 years of age. Sunamganj Sadar had a literacy rate (age 7 and over) of 38.76%, compared to the national average of 51.8%, and a sex ratio of 999 females per 1000 males. 70,126 (25.13%) lived in urban areas.

In the 2001 census the population of the upazila was approximately 367,230, with males constituting 51.32% of the population, and females 48.68% of the population (a drop of 0.5% since 1991). There were 401 villages present, with 8,341 households, with 236 mauzas, 14 unions, 44 mahallahs, and 9 wards. The total literacy rate for both females and males was 35.3%, an increase of 2.9% since 1991.

In the 1991 Bangladesh census, Sunamganj Sadar had a population of 303,153. Males constituted 51.27% of the population, and females 48.73%. The population above 18 was 153,046. Sunamganj Sadar had an average literacy rate of 23.9% (7+ years), below the national average of 32.4%.

Religions: Muslim 65%, Hindu 35%, Christian 2%, Buddhist 0.72%, and others 0.28%

== Administration ==
Sunamganj Sadar Upazila is divided into Sunamganj Municipality and nine union parishads: Aptabnagar, Gourarang, Jahangirnagar, Kathair, Laxmansree, Mohonpur, Mollahpara, Rangarchar, and Surma. The union parishads are subdivided into 114 mauzas and 268 villages.

Sunamganj Municipality is subdivided into 9 wards and 44 mahallas.

== Technology ==
The city of Sunamganj is now being developed in different areas like technology, education, improvement of living system though it is far away from the modern technology. For instance, except few people, nobody knows how can use an internet or just making a phone call. However, nowadays, many residents use modern technology instead without formal education. There are five first class international standard mobile phone company like Grameen phone and Banglalink. and national mobile phone company Teletalk has been installing communication tower, BTS, and related to its even every place from city to rural areas. This area is becoming the most probable business sector for mobile companies to make a business. Now everyone has at least a mobile phone even he or she is worker. In addition, these communication companies are offering competitive call rates and data bonus.

On the other hand, every school, college or madrasa are offering computer education. Besides, most of the coaching centers are also bestowing the basic introduction to English with computers in the city.

== Notable people ==
- Hason Raja, musician, mystic poet, philosopher
- Dewan Mohammad Azraf, teacher, author, politician, journalist, philosopher
- Shah Abdul Karim, musician, philosopher, mysterious poet, Baul Emperor

== See also ==
- Sunamganj
- Upazilas of Bangladesh
- Districts of Bangladesh
- Divisions of Bangladesh
- Administrative geography of Bangladesh
