= Chhatak =

Chhatak ছাতক
- Town
- Location within Bangladesh
- Coordinates: 25°2′N 91°40′E
- Country: Bangladesh
- Division: Sylhet Division
- District: Sunamganj
- Upazila: Chhatak

Area
  - Total: 9.24 km^{2} (3.57 sq mi)

Population
  - Total: 34,498
  - Density: 3,730/km^{2} (9,670/sq mi)
- Time zone: UTC+6 (BST)

Chhatak Municipality mahallah geocode map

Chhatak (Bengali: ছাতক; formerly known as Chhatak Bazaar) is a town in northeastern Bangladesh, on the Surma River in Chhatak Upazila of Sunamganj District in the division of Sylhet.
