= Kalim Uddin Ahmed =

Bangladeshi politician

Kalim Uddin Ahmed Milon

Member of Bangladesh Parliament

Personal details
- Party: Bangladesh Nationalist Party (BNP)

Kalim Uddin Ahmed is a Bangladesh Nationalist Party politician and member of parliament for Sunamganj-5.

== Career ==
Kalim Uddin Ahmed Milon was elected to parliament from Sunamganj-5 as a Bangladesh Nationalist Party candidate in 2001 and 2026.
