= Sylhet Division =

Division of Bangladesh

Sylhet Division সিলেট বিভাগ ꠍꠤꠟꠐ ꠛꠤꠜꠣꠉ
- Division of Bangladesh
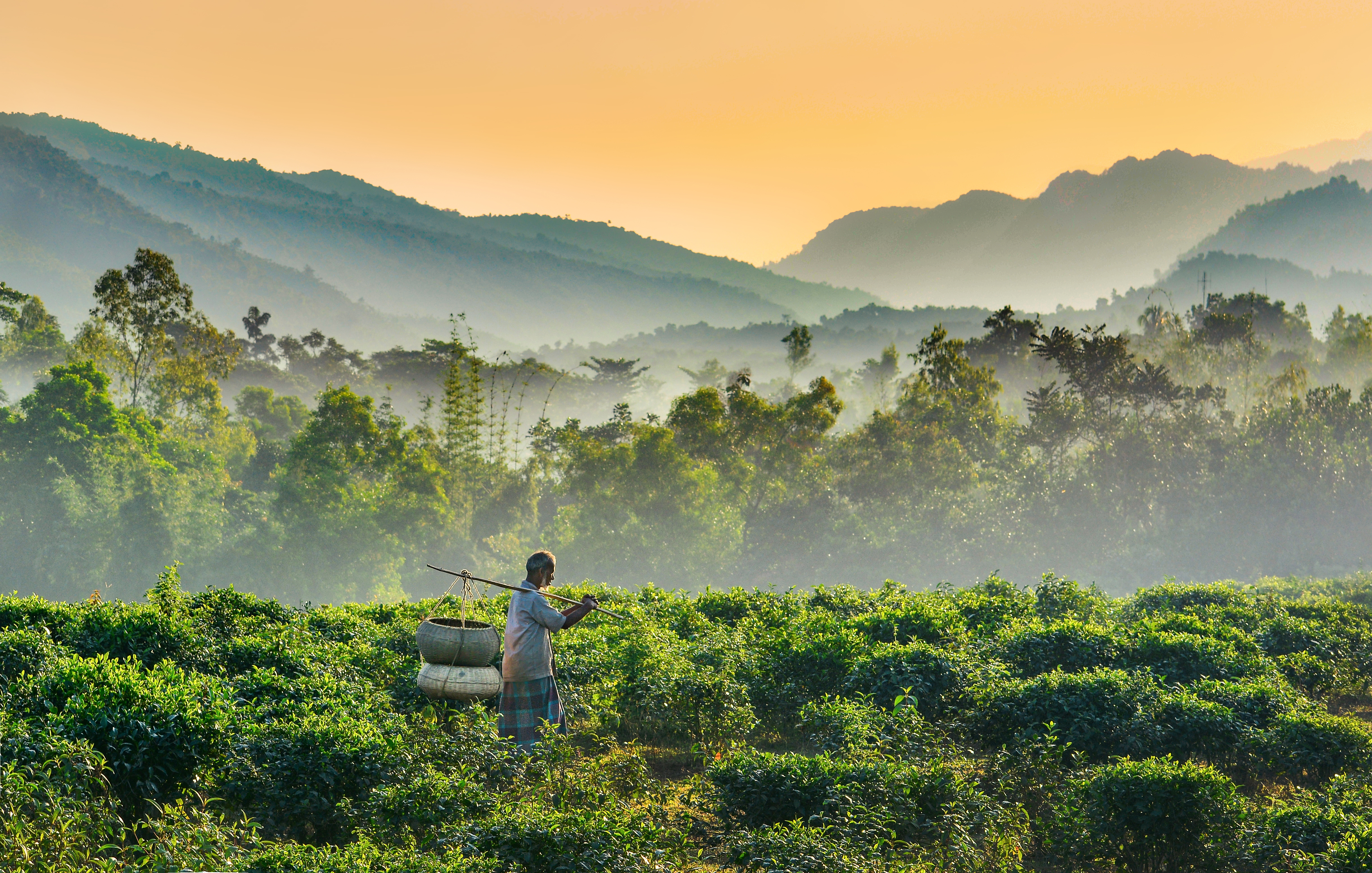
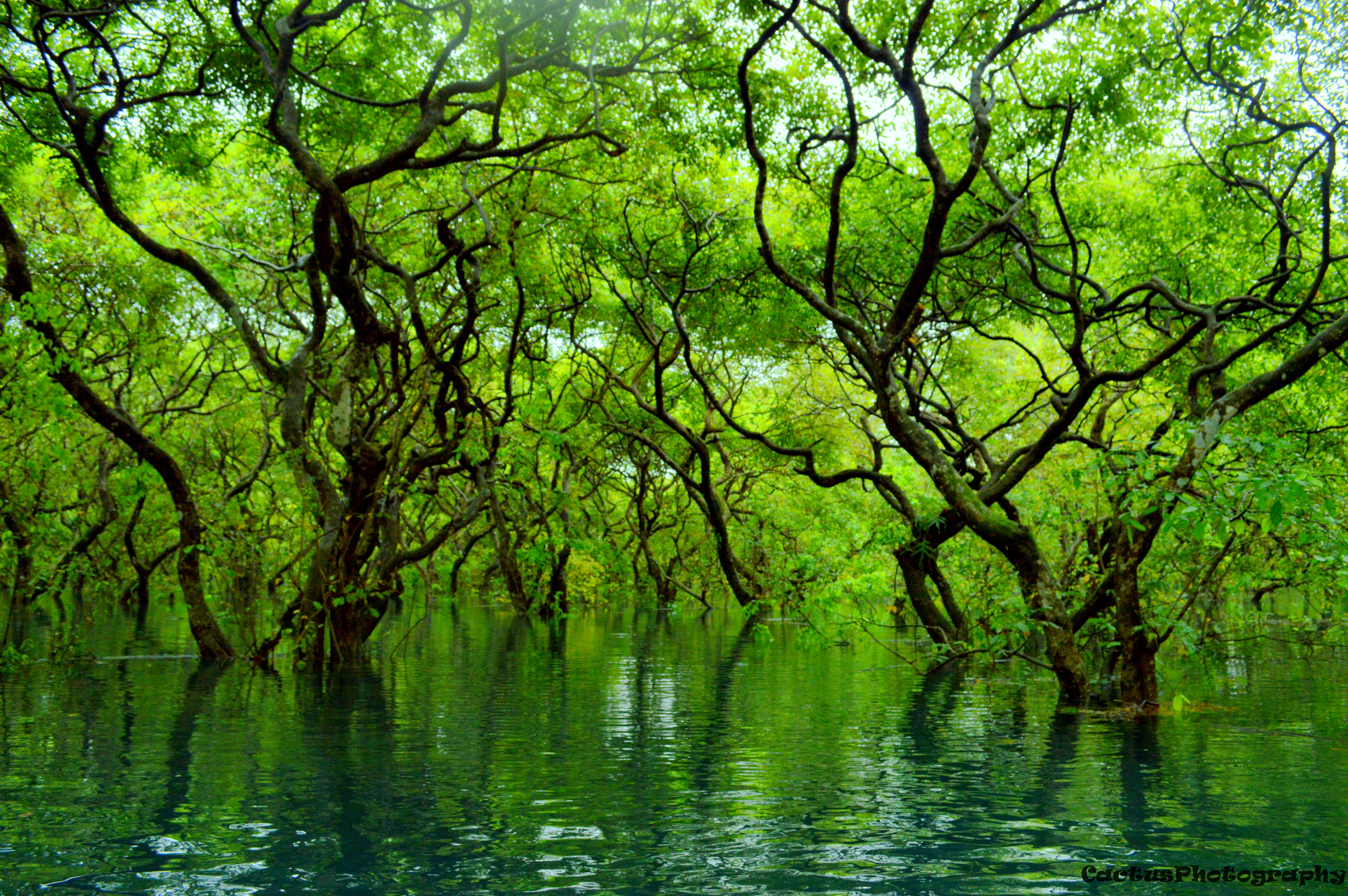
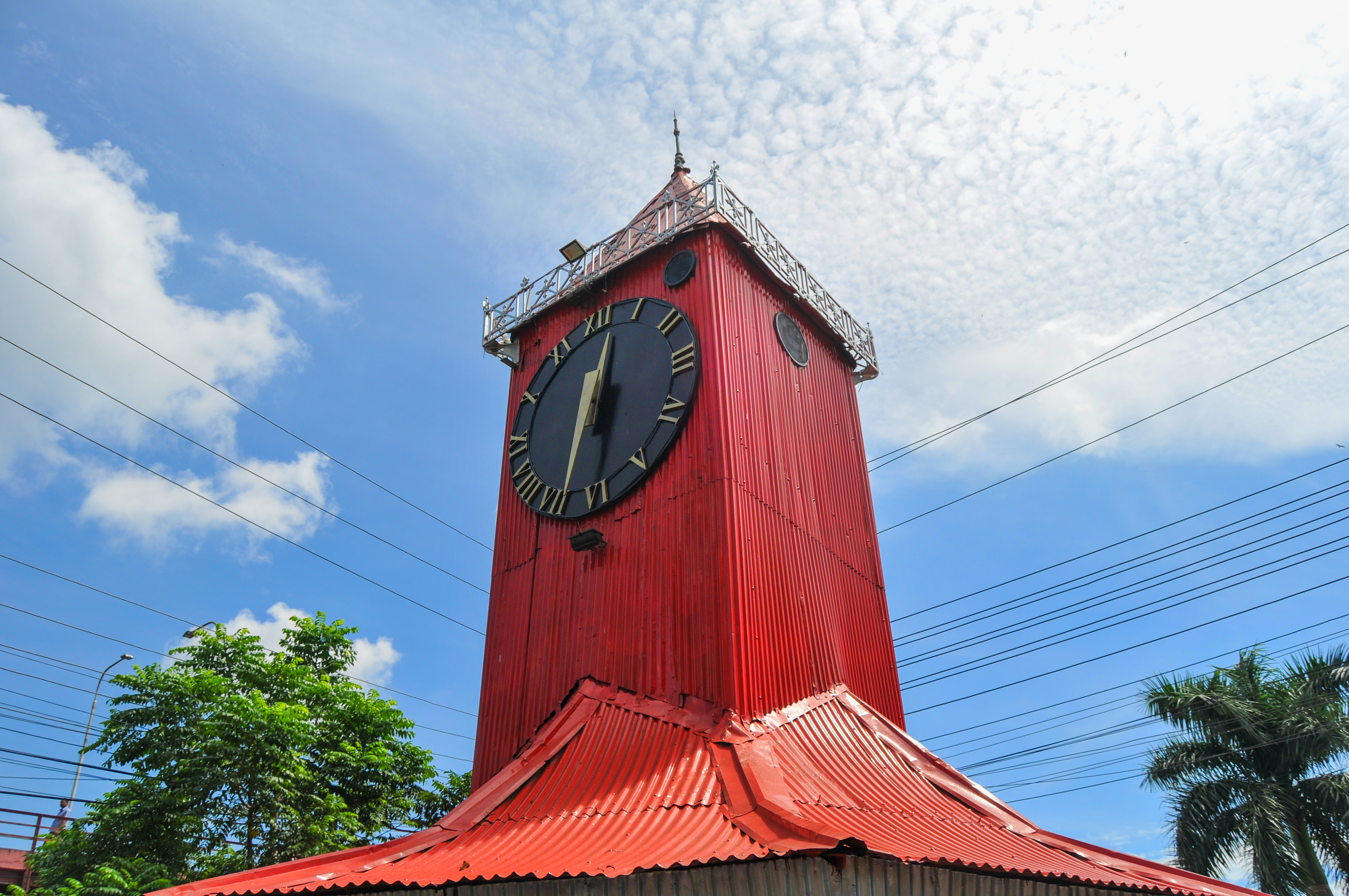
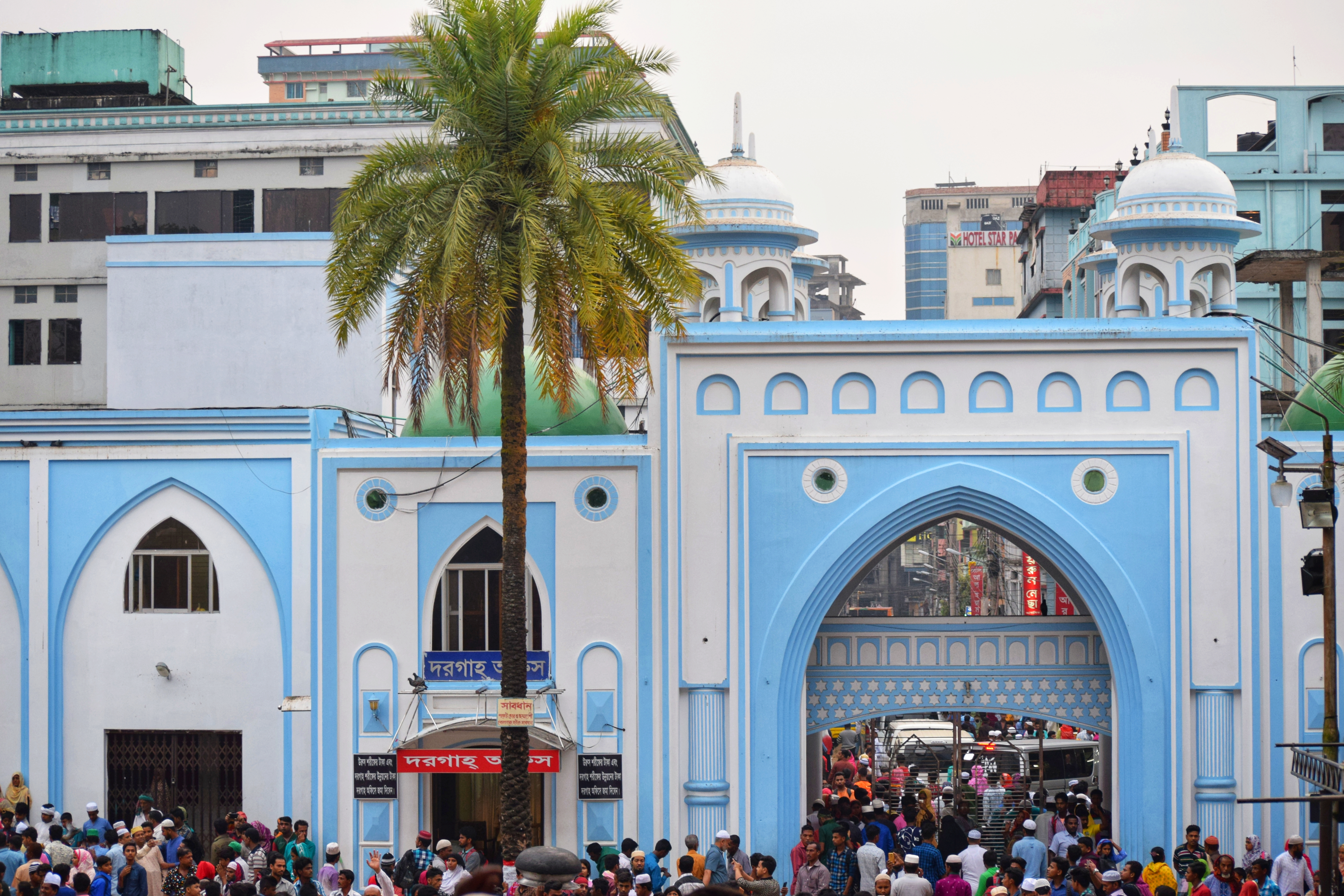
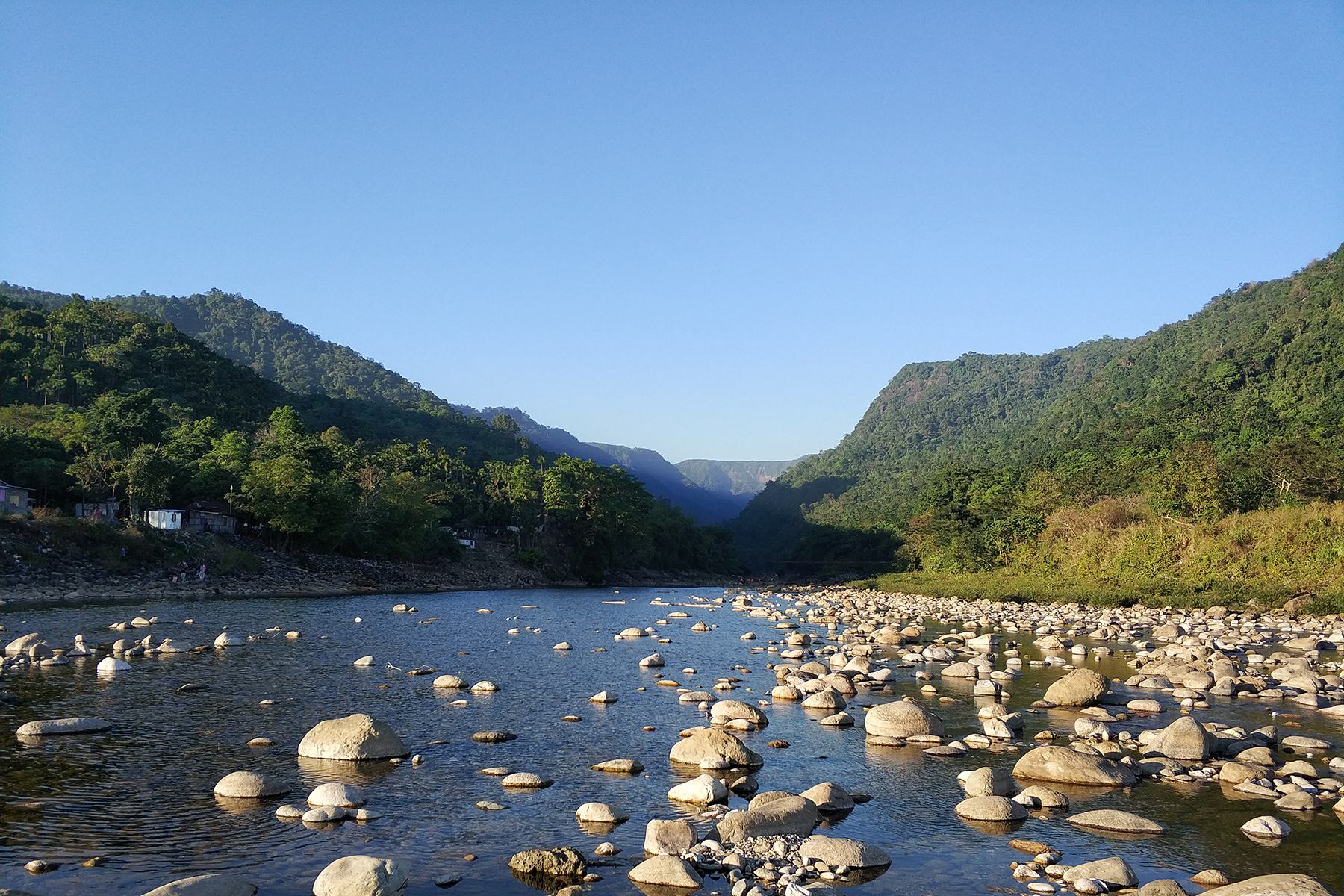
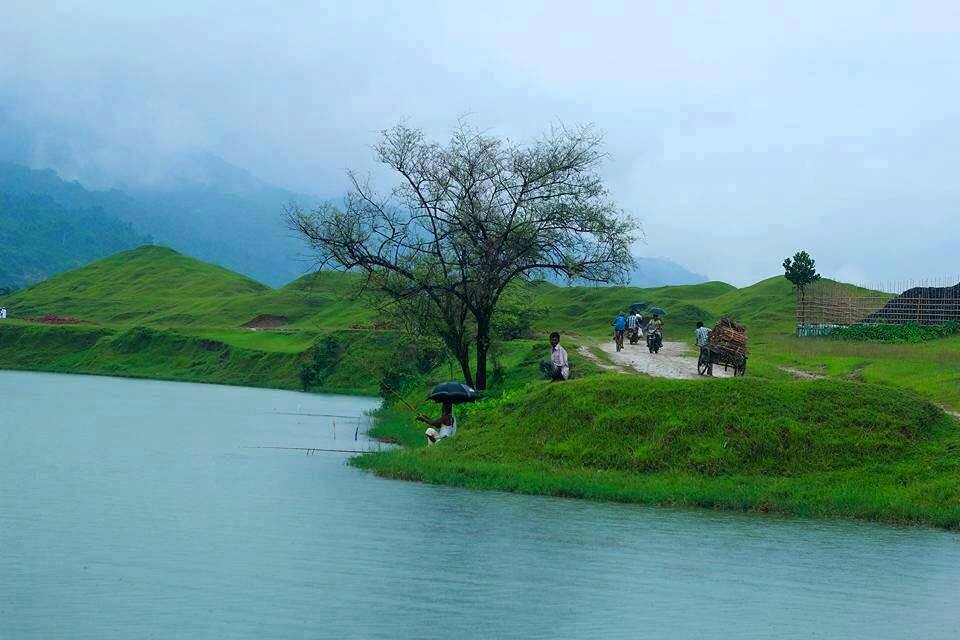
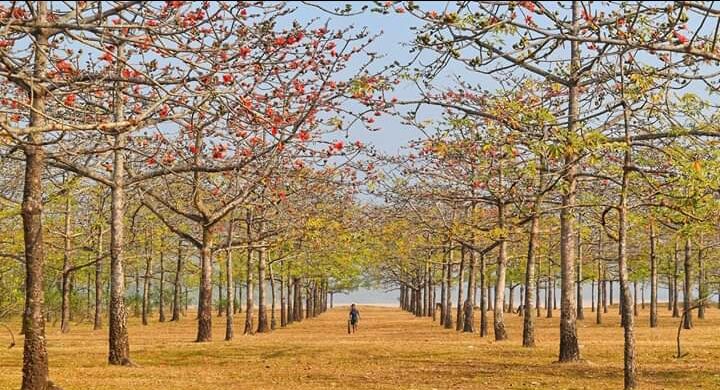
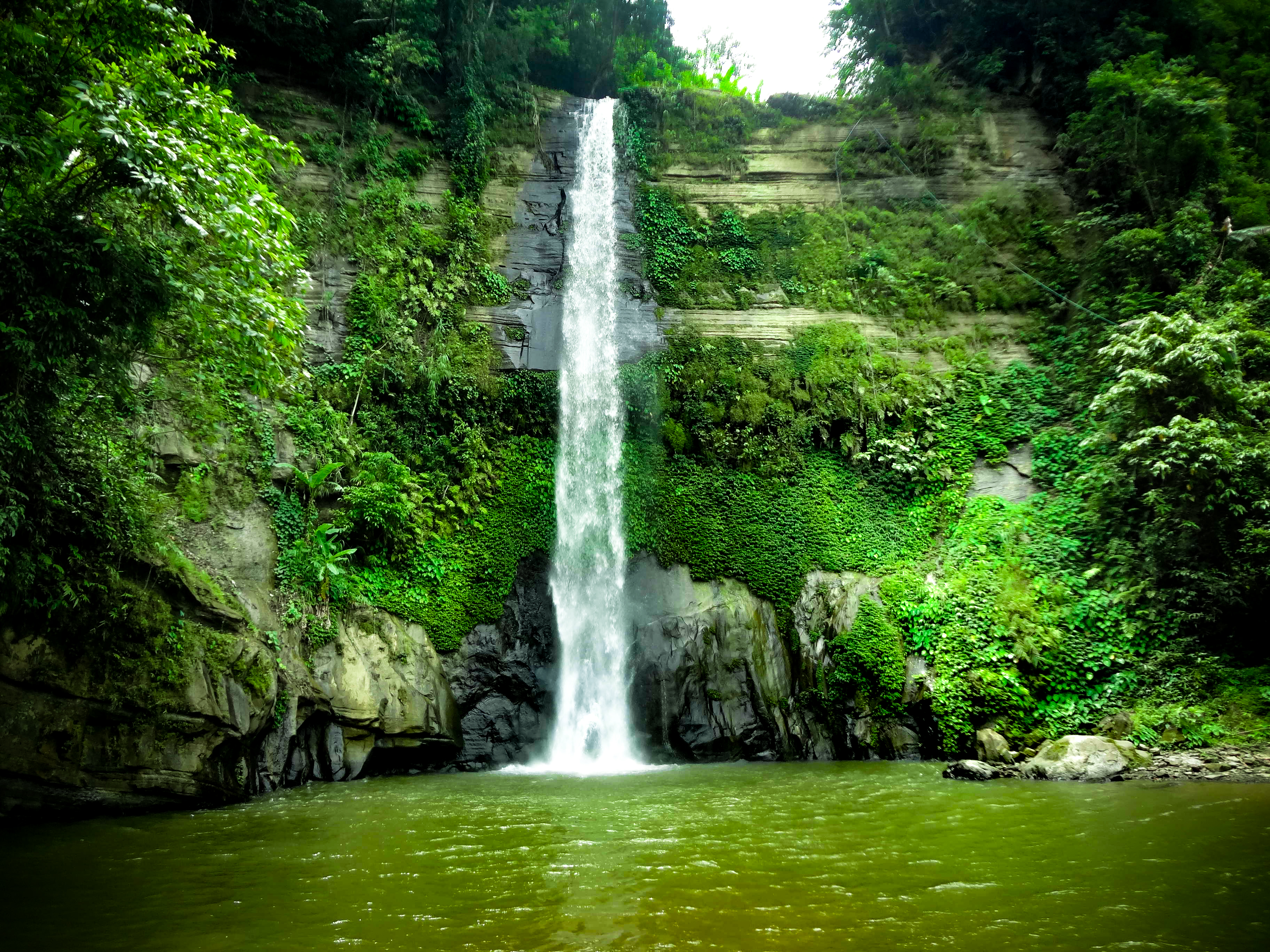
- Jaflong Ratargul Swamp Forest Ali Amjad's Clock Shah Jalal Dargah Bichnakandi Tanguar Haor Shimul Garden Madhabkunda Waterfall
- Nickname(s): Srihatta, Sribhumi, Jalalabad, Land of 360 Awliya
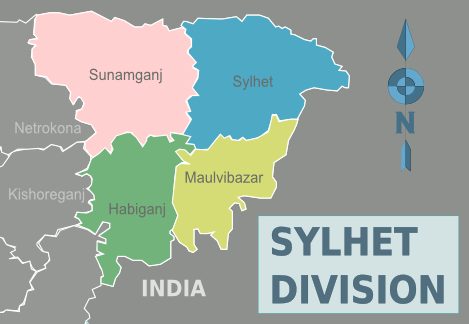
- Coordinates: 24°30′N 91°40′E
- Country: Bangladesh
- Established: 1 August 1995; 31 years ago
- Previously was: Part of Surma Valley Division (1874–1947) and Chittagong Division (1947–1995)
- Capital and largest city: Sylhet
- Districts: 4: Sunamganj; Sylhet; Moulvibazar; Habiganj

Government
  - Type: Local governing division under the central government
  - Body: Divisional Commissioner's Office
  - Divisional Commissioner: Md. Moshiur Rahman
  - Additional Divisional Commissioner: Ashrafur Rahman
  - Parliamentary constituency: Jatiya Sangsad (19 seats)
  - Judiciary: District and Sessions Judge Courts

Area
  - Division of Bangladesh: 12,298.4 km^{2} (4,748.4 sq mi)
- Elevation: 334.67 m (1,098.0 ft)

Population (2022)
  - Division of Bangladesh: 11,034,952 (Enumerated)
  - Density: 897.267/km^{2} (2,323.91/sq mi)
  - Urban: 2,065,498
  - Rural: 8,968,558
  - Metro: 532,748
  - Adjusted Population: 11,415,113
- Demonym: Sylheti

Languages
  - Official language: Bengali
  - Regional language: Sylheti
  - Minority languages: Full list: Bishnupriya Manipuri; Hajong; Kharia; Khasi; Kurukh; Odia; Lyngngam; Manipuri; Pnar; Sadri; War-Jaintia
- Time zone: UTC+6 (BST)
- Postal code: 3000–3399
- ISO 3166 code: BD-G
- HDI (2019): 0.631 medium
- Notable sport teams: Sylhet Titans; Sylhet Division Cricket Team
- Largest stadium: Sylhet International Cricket Stadium
- Largest airport: Osmani International Airport
- Largest train station: Sylhet Railway Station
- Largest haor: Hakaluki
- Major river: Surma
- Website: sylhetdiv.gov.bd

Sylhet Division (Note: Bengali: সিলেট বিভাগ, romanized: Sileṭ Bibhāg, Bengali pronunciation: [sileʈ bibʱaɡ]; Sylheti: ꠍꠤꠟꠐ ꠛꠤꠜꠣꠉ, romanized: Silôṭ Bibág, Sylheti pronunciation: [sílɔʈ bibáɡ].) (Bengali: সিলেট বিভাগ, pronounced [sileʈ bibʱaɡ]) is the northeastern division of Bangladesh. It covers an area of approximately 12,298 km^{2} (4,748 sq mi), and shares international borders with the Indian states of Meghalaya, Assam and Tripura to the north, east and south respectively—while domestically it adjoins the divisions of Chattogram to the southwest and Dhaka and Mymensingh to the west. Sylhet's eponymous capital is the fifth-largest urban agglomeration in Bangladesh.

Prior to Partition in 1947, it included Karimganj subdivision (presently in Barak Valley, Assam, India). However, Karimganj (including the thanas of Badarpur, Patharkandi and Ratabari) was inexplicably severed from Sylhet by the Radcliffe Boundary Commission. According to Niharranjan Ray, it was partly due to a plea from a delegation led by Abdul Matlib Mazumdar.

== Etymology ==
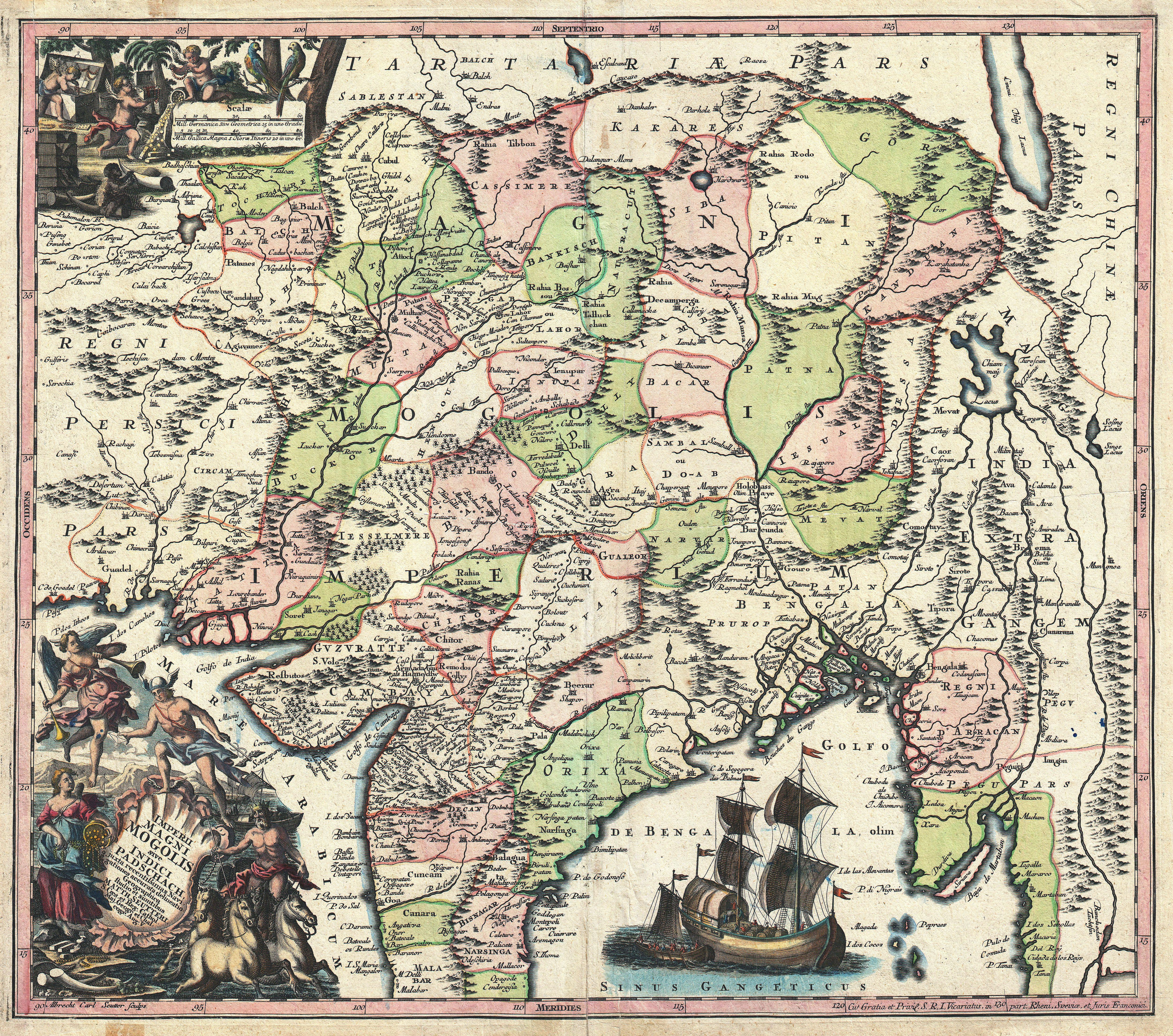
Sirote was a name used by Europeans in the 1700s

The Sylhet Division is named after its headquarters, the city of Sylhet. Sylhet is the anglicisation of শিলহট (Śilhôṭ), one of the archaic native names for the city. The local name is generally thought to be directly derived from শ্রীহট্ট (Śrīhaṭṭa), the Sanskrit name of the city. The city of Śrīhaṭṭa takes its name from Śrīhaṭṭanātha, the tutelary deity of the Nātha dynasty who promoted the early settlement of Nāthas in the Surma and Barak valleys between the twelfth and thirteenth centuries, founding the Śrīhaṭṭa janapada and establishing Śrīhaṭṭanātha idols across the region. The later Hindu rajas of Sylhet, such as Gour Govinda, continued to pay tribute to the deity as Hāṭkeśvara or Haṭṭanātha as evident from the Devipurana and copper-plate inscriptions.

== History ==
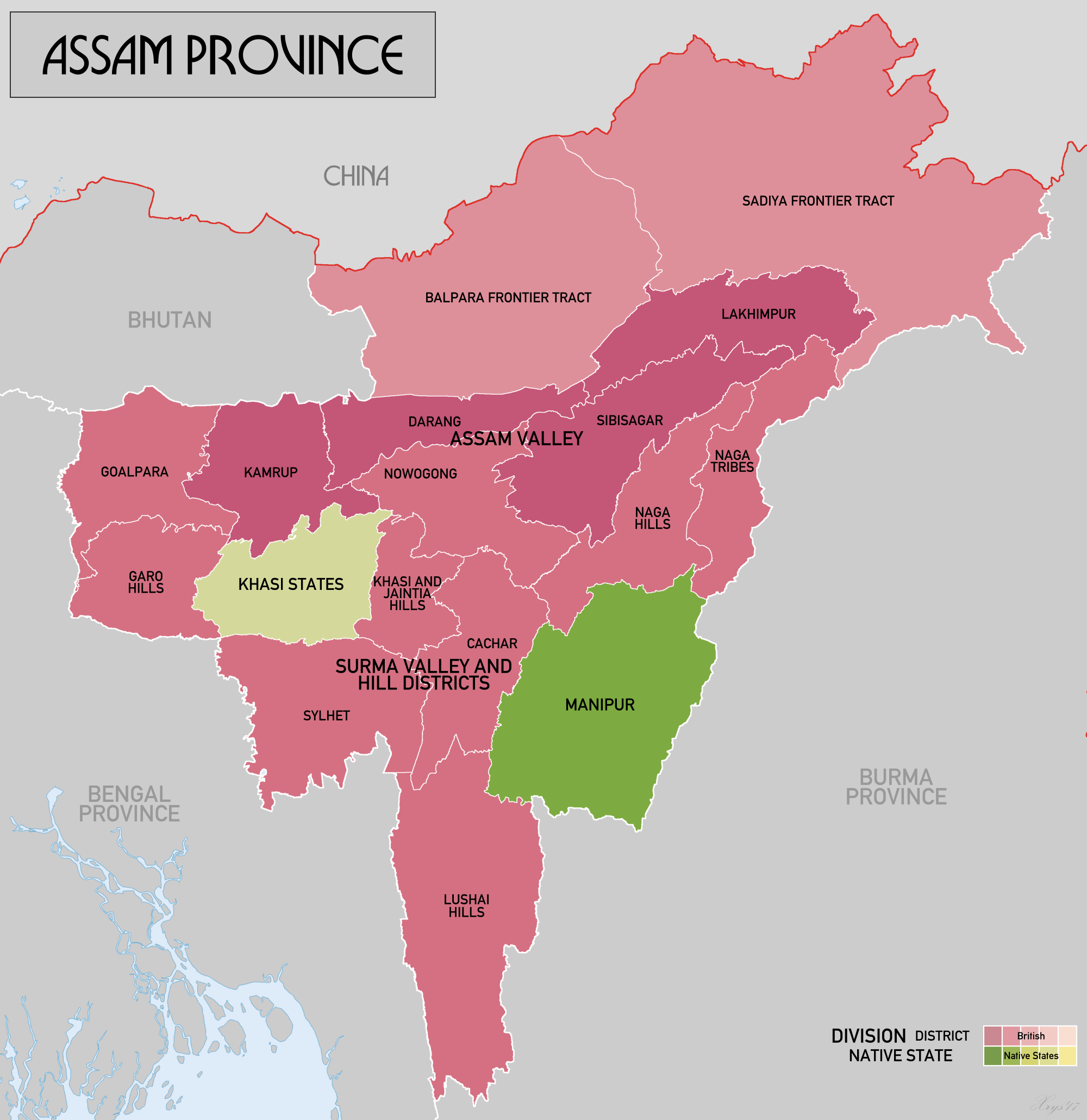
The Assam Province's Sylhet District contained Karimganj.

In 1874, the current Sylhet Division, which included Karimganj District, was entirely known as the 'Sylhet district'. On 16 February 1874, Sylhet was separated from mainland Bengal to be made a part of the non-regulation Chief Commissioner's Province of Assam (Northeast Frontier Province) in order to facilitate Assam's commercial development. The people of Sylhet submitted a memorandum to the Viceroy protesting the inclusion in Assam. The protests subsided when the Viceroy, Lord Northbrook, visited Sylhet to reassure the people that education and justice would be administered from Bengal, and when the people in Sylhet saw the opportunity of employment in tea estates in Assam and a market for their produce. In 1905, Sylhet district rejoined Bengal as a part of the new Surma Valley Division of Eastern Bengal and Assam. In 1912, the then Sylhet district was once again moved to the newly created Assam Province alongside the other districts of the Surma Valley Division. Historically, the entire Sylhet region was a single district within the Surma Valley and Hill Districts Division as part of the Assam Province.

During the partition of India in 1947, a plebiscite was held to determine whether the Sylhet region would remain in India or join East Pakistan. Abdul Matlib Mazumdar led a delegation advocating for the region to remain with India. However, due to demands from the Muslim League and support from Assam's political leaders at the time, the plebiscite resulted in Sylhet's transfer to Pakistan by a narrow margin. Allegations of electoral fraud and irregularities were raised, but the results stood. However, the district's Karimganj subdivision was given to India by Cyril Radcliffe, after apparently being pleaded by a delegation led by Abdul Matlib Mazumdar. The four other subdivisions (North Sylhet, South Sylhet, Habiganj and Sunamganj) joined the Dominion of Pakistan; subsequently forming East Bengal's 'Sylhet district' in the Chittagong division.

Following the independence of Bangladesh in 1971, Sylhet became part of the new nation. In 1984, the four subdivisions of Sylhet District were upgraded to districts as part of Chief Martial Law Administrator Hussain Muhammad Ershad's decentralisation programme. The four districts remained part of Chittagong Division until 1995, when they formed the new Sylhet Division.

The Sylhet Division has a "friendship link" with the city of St Albans, in the United Kingdom. The link was established in 1988 when the St Albans District Council supported a housing project in Sylhet as part of the International Year of Shelter for the Homeless. Sylhet was chosen because it is the area of origin for the largest ethnic minority group in St Albans. Sylhet also has many "friendship links" with other cities in the United Kingdom, as the majority of the half-million British Bangladeshis have origins in Sylhet. This includes places such as Rochdale, Oldham, London, and many more places.

== Economy ==
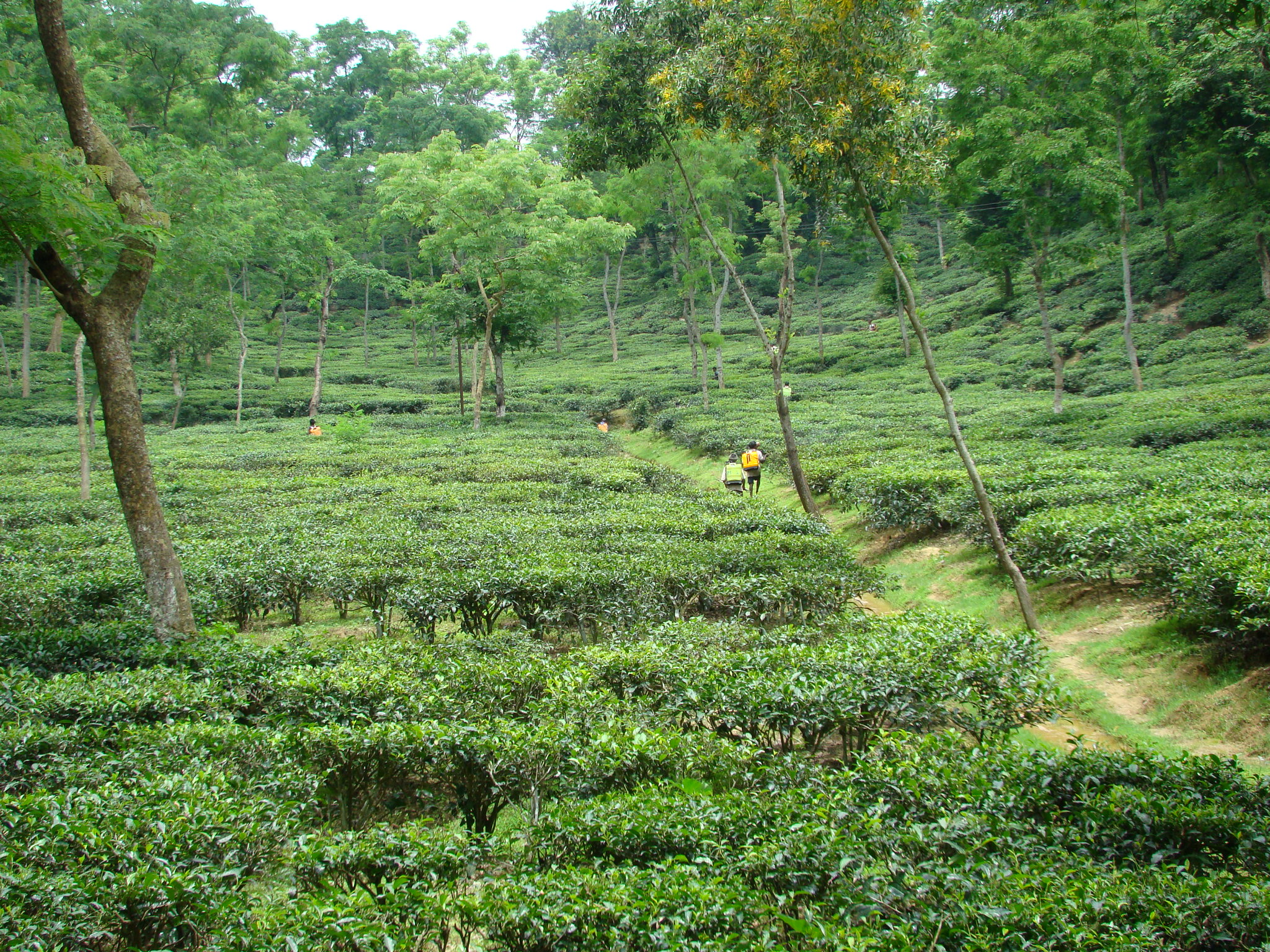
The Mulnicherra Estate is the oldest tea garden in South Asia

The area around Sylhet is a traditional tea growing area. The Surma Valley is covered with terraces of tea gardens and tropical forests. Srimangal is known as the tea capital of Bangladesh; for miles around, tea gardens are visible on the hill slopes.

The area has over 150 tea gardens out of a total of 166 tea estates located all over Bangladesh, including three of the largest tea plantations in the world, both in terms of area and production. Nearly 300,000 workers, of which more than 75% are women, are employed on the tea estates. Employers prefer to engage women for plucking tea leaves since they do a better job than, but are paid less than, men. A recent drought has killed nearly a tenth of the tea shrubs.

The plantations, or gardens, were mostly developed during the British Raj, the Malnicherra Tea Estate being established in Sylhet in the year 1854. The plantations were started by the British, and the managers still live in the white timber houses built during the Raj. The bungalows stand on huge lawns. The service and the lifestyle of managers are still unchanged.

Numerous projects and businesses in the city and in large towns have been funded by Sylhetis living and working abroad. As of 1986, an estimated 95 percent of ethnic British Bangladeshis originated from or had ancestors from the Sylhet region. The Bangladesh government has set up a special Export Processing Zone (EPZ) in Sylhet, in order to attract foreign investors, mainly from the UK.

Sylhet has also benefited from tourism. There are many natural landmarks people tend to visit, such as the Keane Bridge, Ali Amjad's Clock, Lalakhal, Jaflong, Madhabkunda waterfall, Ratargul Swamp Forest, Hakaluki Haor, Lawachara National Park, Tanguar Haor and Bichnakandi. Sylhet is also considered to be the spiritual capital of Bangladesh, due to the resting place of Shah Jalal, a Sufi saint who spread Islam in Bangladesh, along with hundreds of his disciples. The Sylhet Shahi Eidgah is a famous place where Eid prayers take place and it is one of the largest Eidgahs in Bangladesh, built by Farhad Khan during the reign of Mughal emperor Aurangzeb. There are numerous hotels and resorts, particularly in Sreemangal and Bahubal.

== Governance ==
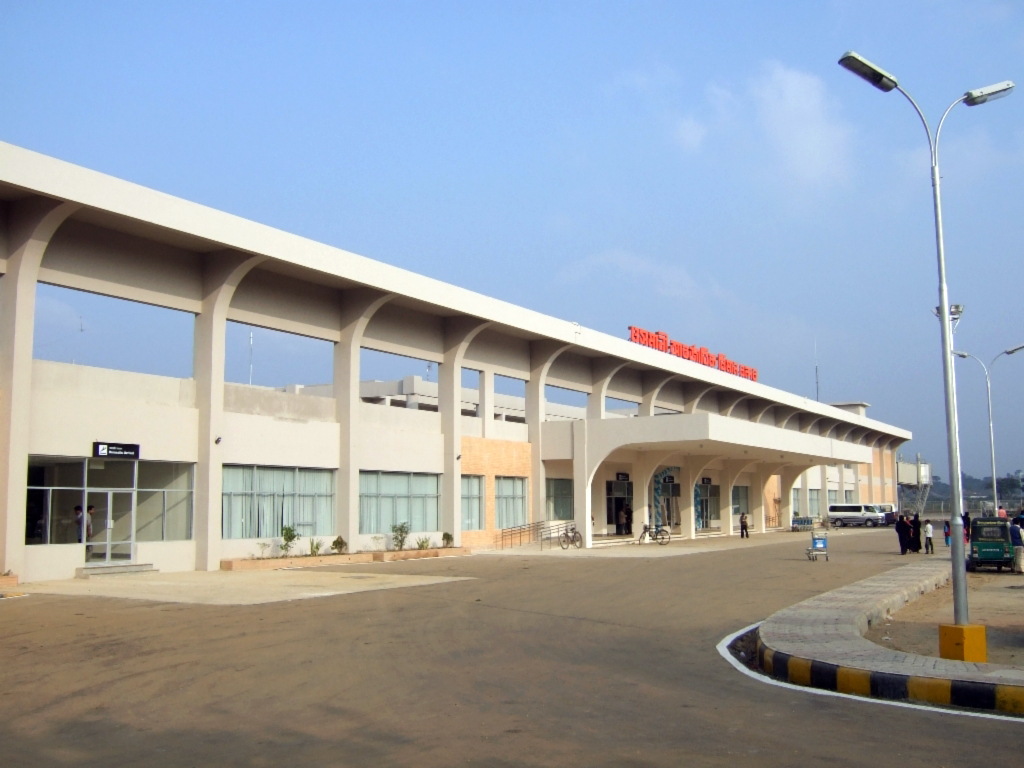
Osmani International Airport

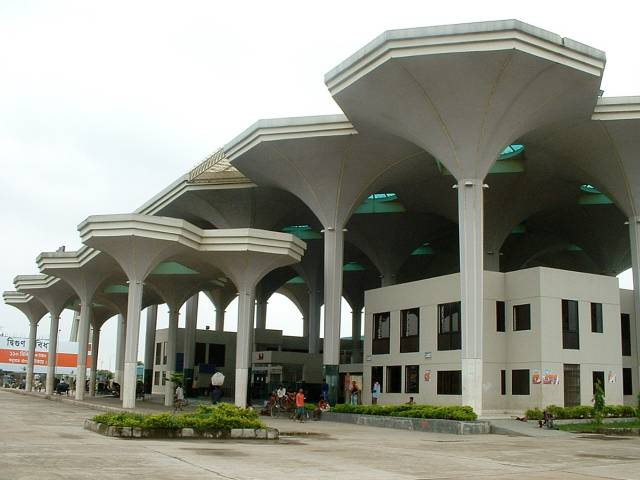
Sylhet Railway station

In 1995, Sylhet split from Chittagong Division and was declared as the 6th division of the country. The Sylhet Division is overseen by the Divisional Commissioner, the current Divisional Commissioner is Md. Mashiur Rahman. The Sylhet Division is divided into four districts (Habiganj, Moulvibazar, Sunamganj and Sylhet) and further divided into 35 upazilas (sub-districts). These upazilas are further divided into 323 union parishads. Each union is roughly divided into 9 wards before going to village-level. There are roughly 10,185 villages in the Division. The Division hosts 19 Municipal corporations known as pourashavas, and one city corporation in Sylhet city. It also has 19 Parliamentary constituencies. The headquarters of the Sylhet Division is the city of Sylhet in Sylhet Sadar Upazila, Sylhet District. Pre-partition Sylhet's Karimganj has been governed by India since 1947.

Name	Capital	Area (km^{2})	Population 1991 Census	Population 2001 Census	Population 2011 Census	Population 2022 Census
Habiganj District	Habiganj	2,536.58	1,526,609	1,757,665	2,089,001	2,358,747
Moulvibazar District	Moulvibazar	2,601.84	1,376,566	1,612,374	1,919,062	2,123,349
Sunamganj District	Sunamganj	3,669.58	1,708,563	2,013,738	2,467,968	2,695,294
Sylhet District	Sylhet	3,490.40	2,153,301	2,555,566	3,434,188	3,856,974
Total District	4	12,298.4	6,765,039	7,939,343	9,910,219	11,034,364

List of Upazilas in Sylhet Division

District	Upazila
Habiganj District	1. Ajmiriganj Upazila; 2. Bahubal Upazila; 3. Baniachong Upazila; 4. Chunarughat Upazila; 5. Habiganj Sadar Upazila; 6. Lakhai Upazila; 7. Madhabpur Upazila; 8. Nabiganj Upazila; 9. Sayestaganj Upazila
Moulvibazar District	1. Barlekha Upazila; 2. Juri Upazila; 3. Kamalganj Upazila; 4. Kulaura Upazila; 5. Moulvibazar Sadar Upazila; 6. Rajnagar Upazila; 7. Sreemangal Upazila
Sunamganj District	1. Bishwamvarpur Upazila; 2. Chhatak Upazila; 3. Dakshin Sunamganj Upazila; 4. Derai Upazila; 5. Dharamapasha Upazila; 6. Dowarabazar Upazila; 7. Jagannathpur Upazila; 8. Jamalganj Upazila; 9. Madhyanagar Upazila; 10. Shantiganj Upazila; 11. Sullah Upazila; 12. Sunamganj Sadar Upazila; 13. Tahirpur Upazila
Sylhet District	1. Balaganj Upazila; 2. Beanibazar Upazila; 3. Bishwanath Upazila; 4. Companiganj Upazila; 5. Fenchuganj Upazila; 6. Golapganj Upazila; 7. Gowainghat Upazila; 8. Jaintiapur Upazila; 9. Kanaighat Upazila; 10. Osmani Nagar Upazila; 11. South Surma Upazila; 12. Sylhet Sadar Upazila; 13. Zakiganj Upazila

== Geography ==
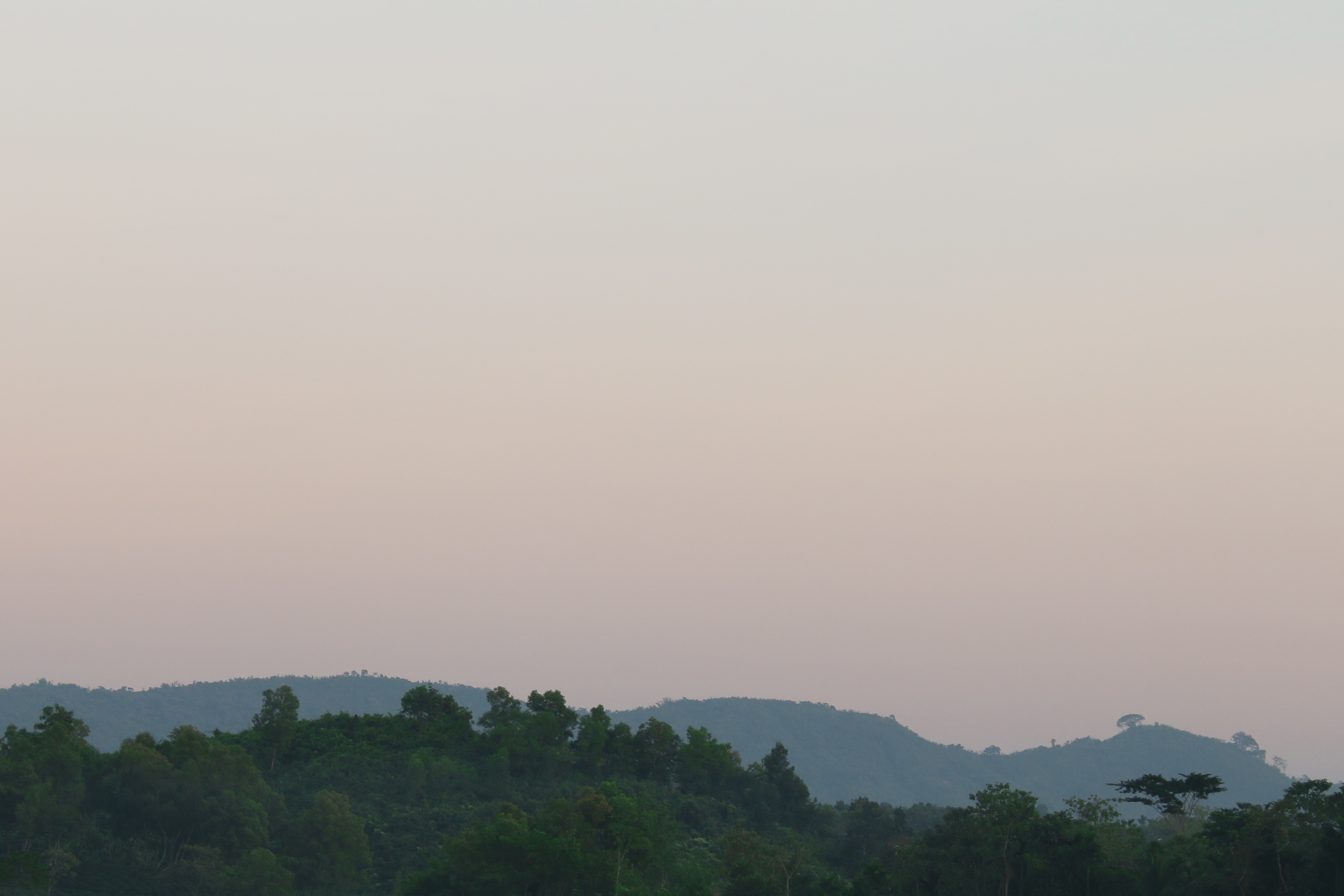
The highest peak in the region is Kala pahar located in the Longla Ridge (Hararganj-Singla range).

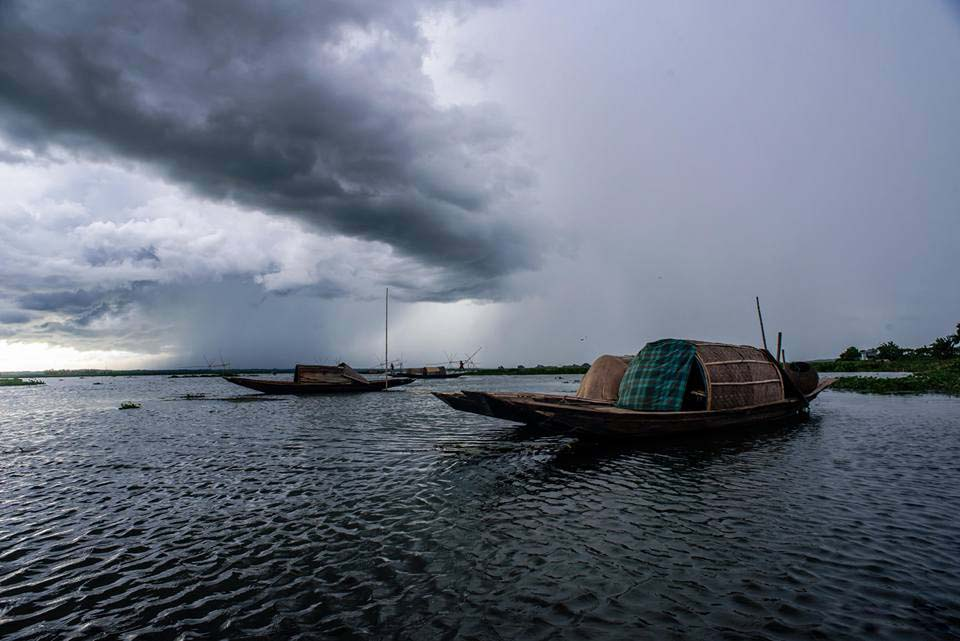
Hakaluki Haor is the largest haor in Bangladesh.

Geographically the region is surrounded by hillocks (known as tillas) from all three sides except its western plain boundary with the rest of Bengal. In the south of the region (Habiganj, Moulvibazar), eight hill ranges enter the plains of Sylhet running uniformly from the west to the east. They are: Raghunandan, Dinarpur-Shatgaon, Balishira, Bhanugach-Rajkandi, Hararganj-Singla, Patharia, Pratapgarh-Duhalia and Sorrispur-Siddheswar hill ranges. At the centre of the region is also an isolated range known as the Ita Hills.

The region is considered one of the most picturesque and archaeologically rich regions in South Asia. It is home to three national parks; the Lawachara National Park, Khadim Nagar National Park and Satchari National Park, as well as numerous smaller parks and forests such as the Ratargul Swamp Forest, Rema-Kalenga Wildlife Sanctuary. Its burgeoning economy has contributed to the regional attractions of landscapes filled with fragrant orange and pineapple gardens as well as tea plantations. The region has a tropical monsoon climate (Köppen Am) bordering on a humid subtropical climate (Cwa) at higher elevations. The rainy season from April to October is hot and humid with very heavy showers and thunderstorms almost every day, whilst the short dry season from November to February is very warm and fairly clear. Nearly 80% of the annual average rainfall of 4,200 millimetres (170 in) occurs between May and September.

The physiography of the division consists mainly of hill soils, encompassing a few large depressions known locally as "beels" which can be mainly classified as oxbow lakes, caused by tectonic subsidence primarily during the earthquake of 1762.

Geologically, the division is complex having diverse sacrificial geomorphology; high topography of Plio-Miocene age such as the Khasi and Jaintia Hills and small hillocks along the border. At the centre there is a vast low laying flood plain of recent origin with saucer shaped depressions, locally called haors. There are many haors in the region and the largest ones include Hakaluki, Kawadighi, Tanguar and Hail. Available limestone deposits in different parts of the region suggest that the whole area was under the ocean in the Oligo-Miocene. In the last 150 years, three major earthquakes hit the city, at a magnitude of at least 7.5 on the Richter Scale, the last one took place in 1918, although many people are unaware that Sylhet lies on an earthquake prone zone.

=== Flora and fauna ===
The region is home to the Asian elephant and the One-horned rhinoceros, mostly towards the south. Tigers and leopards were once found throughout the region. Other notable fauna include the Sambar deer, Indian hog deer, Sylhet hara and Sylhet roofed turtle.

The Asian elephant were once found in small numbers in places such as Chapghat, Bhanugach, Chamtolla, Mahram and the Raghunandan hills. More abundantly they are found near streams in Singla and Langai.

== Culture ==
=== Language ===
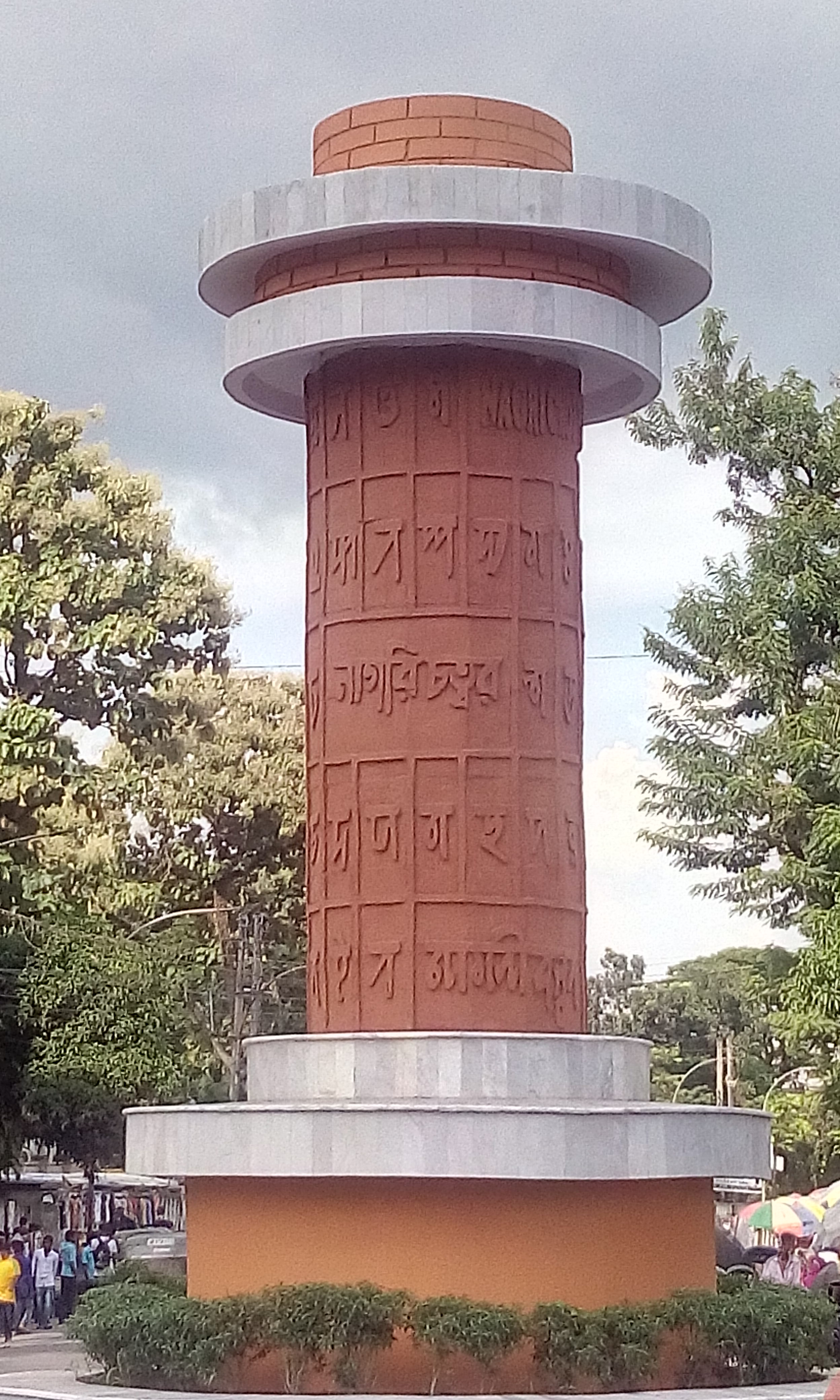
The "Nagari Chattar" (Nagari Square), built near Surma river in the city of Sylhet, consists of the Sylheti Nagri script.

The official language of Sylhet is Standard Bengali, which is used in education and all government affairs in the division. Sylheti dialect is the most widely spoken in the division. The Adivasis and tea labourers brought over during the British colonial rule also have their own native languages such as Khasi, Kuki, Laiunghtor, Meitei, Bishnupriya Manipuri, Hajong, Garo, Odia, Kurmi creole, Hindi, Bhumij and Tripuri.

=== Architecture ===
The intense building of mosques which took place during the Sultanate era indicates the rapidity with which the locals converted to Islam. Today, mosques are present in most Muslim-inhabited villages. Bengali mosques are normally covered with several small domes and curved brick roofs decorated with terracotta. Ponds are often located beside a mosque.

Faujdar Farhad Khan built Sylhet Shahi Eidgah in the 1660s under the reign of Mughal Emperor Aurangzeb. It stands as the largest eidgah of the region.

In 1872, Nawab Moulvi Ali Ahmed Khan of Prithimpassa constructed Ali Amjad's Clock, named after his son, in Sylhet City. In 1936, a bridge was constructed across the Surma River known as the Keane Bridge. These two historic landmarks are known as the gateway to Sylhet city.

Assam-type architecture developed in Sylhet region under Assam Province during the late modern period.

Architecture of Sylhet

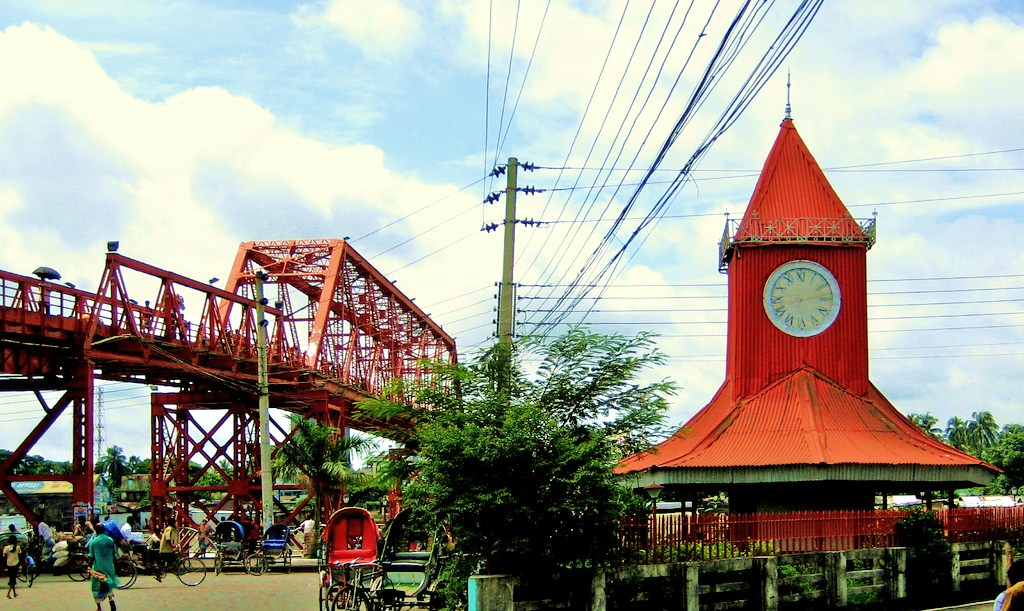
Ali Amjad's Clock and Keane Bridge

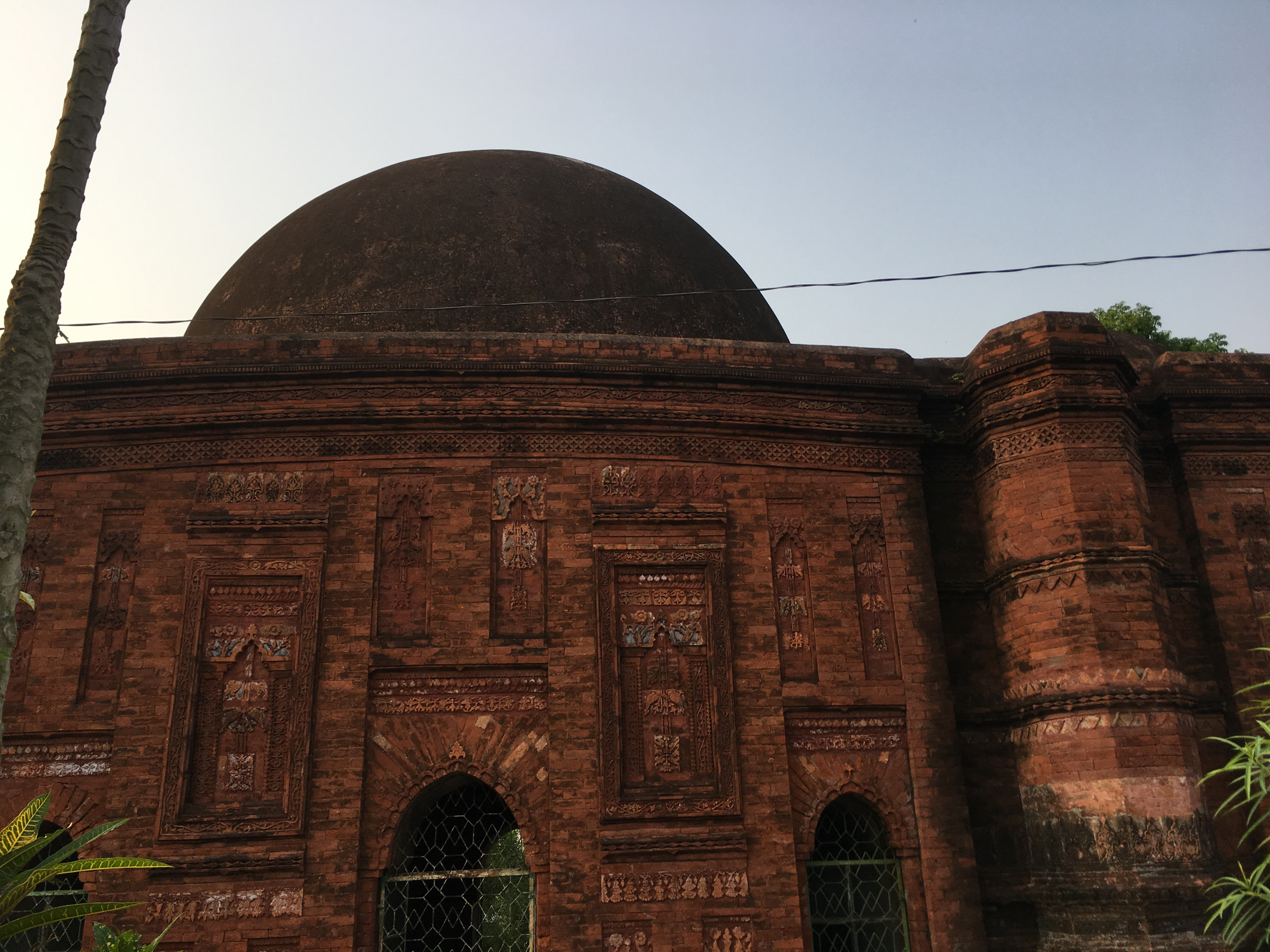
Shankarpasha Shahi Masjid

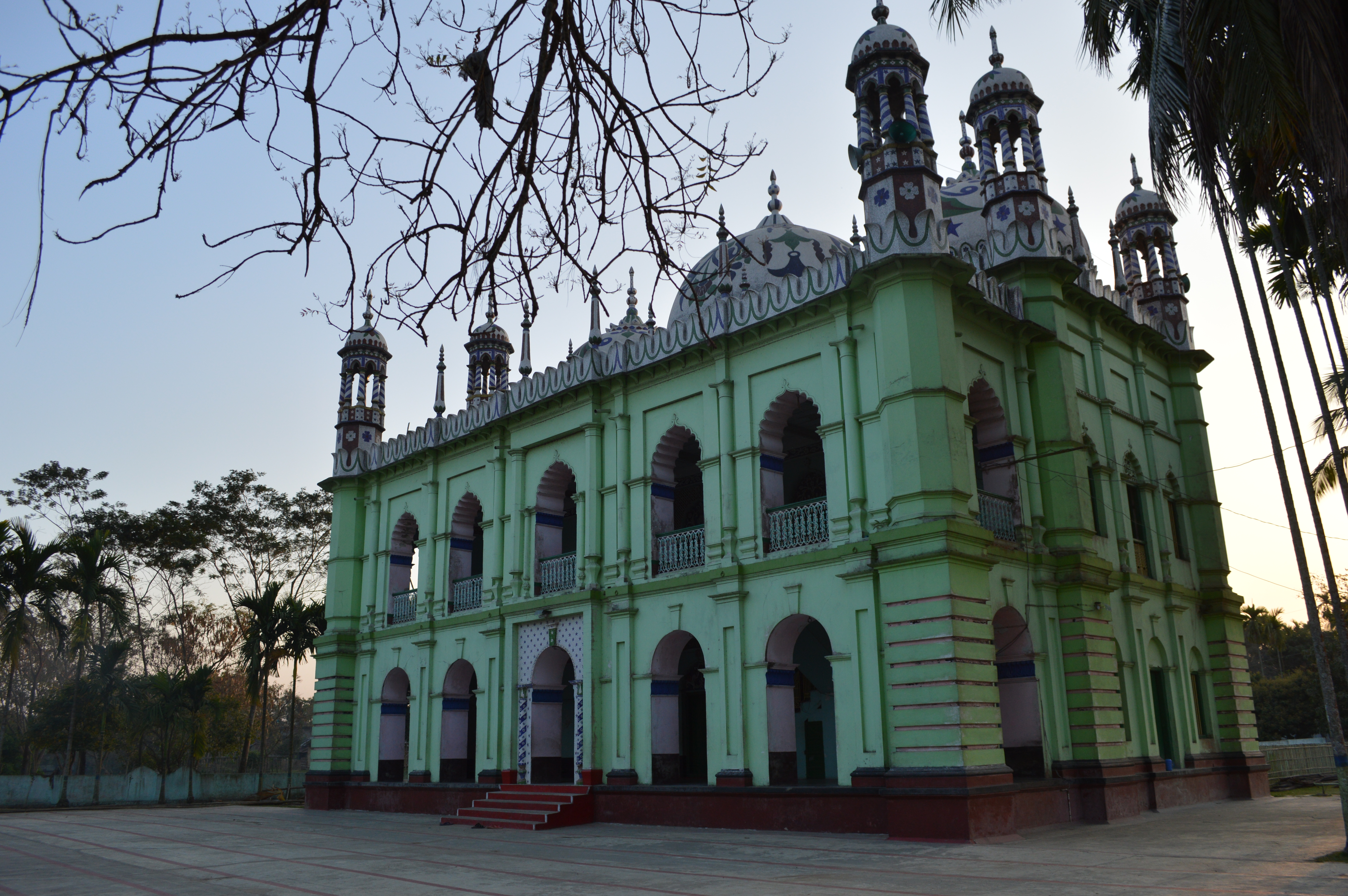
Pagla Jame Masjid

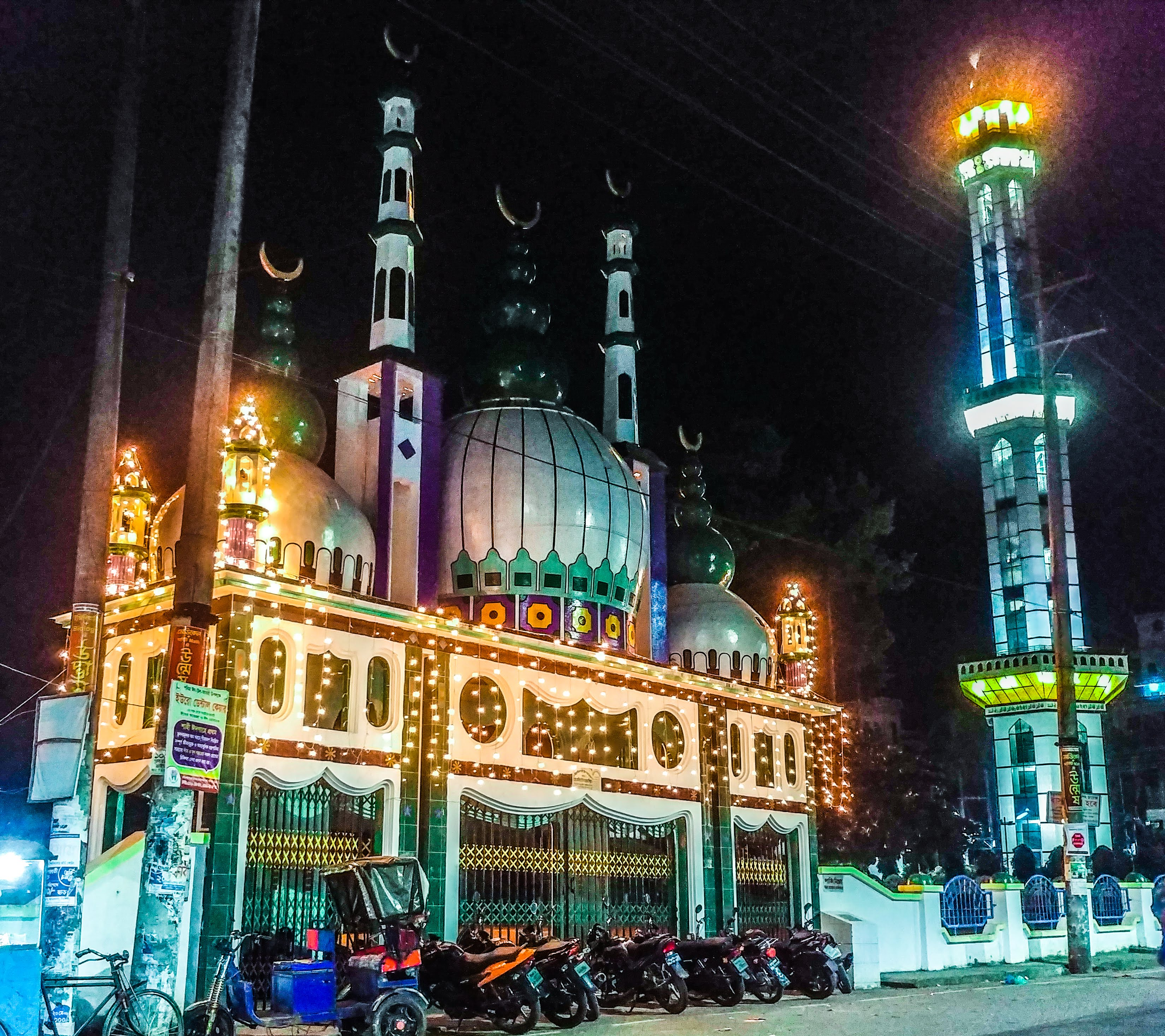
Sylhet Shahi Eidgah entrance

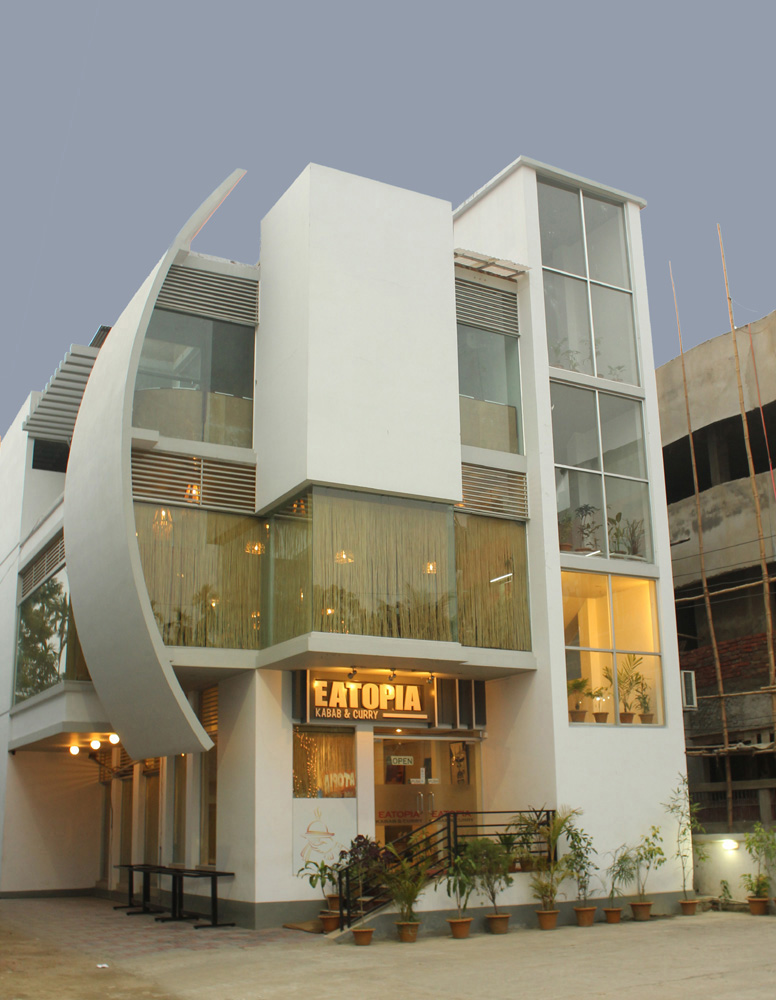
Modern architecture in Sylhet

=== Sports and games ===
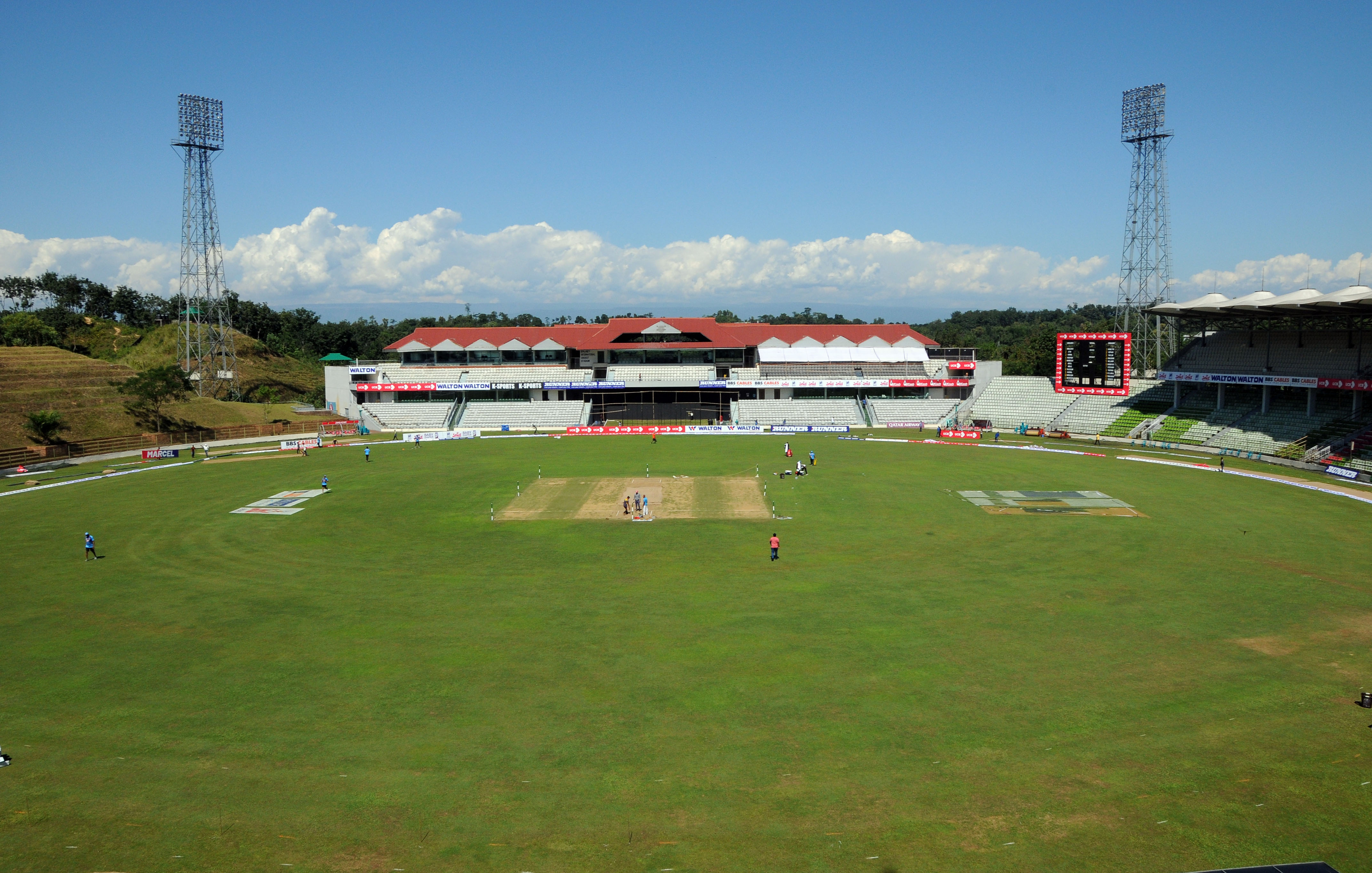
The Sylhet International Cricket Stadium is the largest stadium in the region. It is surrounded by hills and has a scenic view.

Cricket is the most popular sport in Sylhet. Regional cricket teams include Sylhet Thunder, East Zone and the Sylhet Division cricket team. Football is also a common sport and the multi-use Saifur Rahman Stadium are known to host football matches. Beanibazar SC has played in the Bangladesh League. The home stadium of the football club, Sheikh Russel KC, is in Sylhet District Stadium. Board and home games such as Dosh Fochish and its modern counterpart Ludo, as well as Carrom Board, Sur-Fulish, Khanamasi and Chess, are very popular in the region. Nowka Bais is a common traditional rowing competition during the monsoon season when rivers are filled up, and much of the land is under water. Fighting sports include Kabaddi, Latim and Lathi khela.

== Demography ==
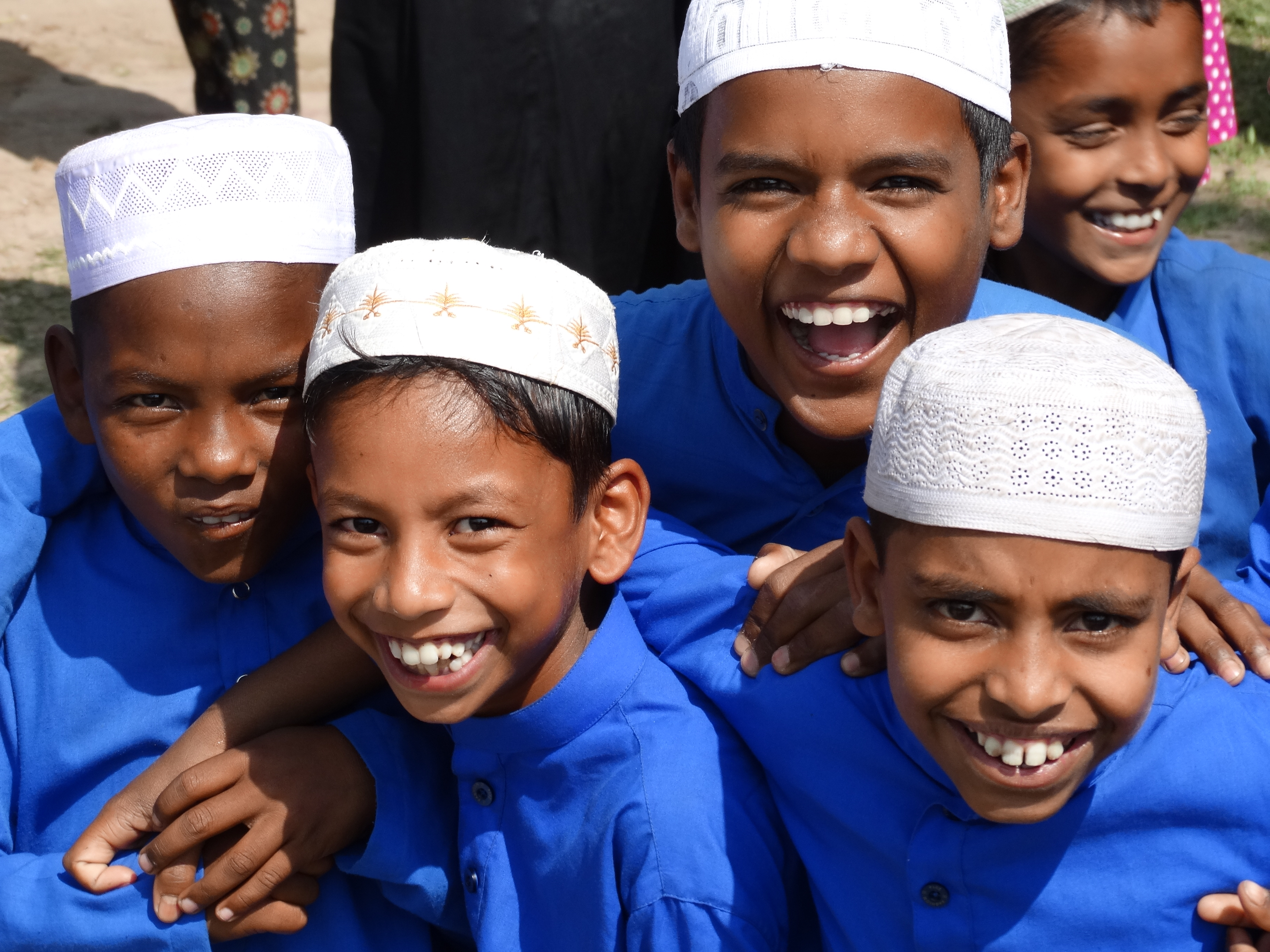
Bengali Muslim primary school students in Srimangal.

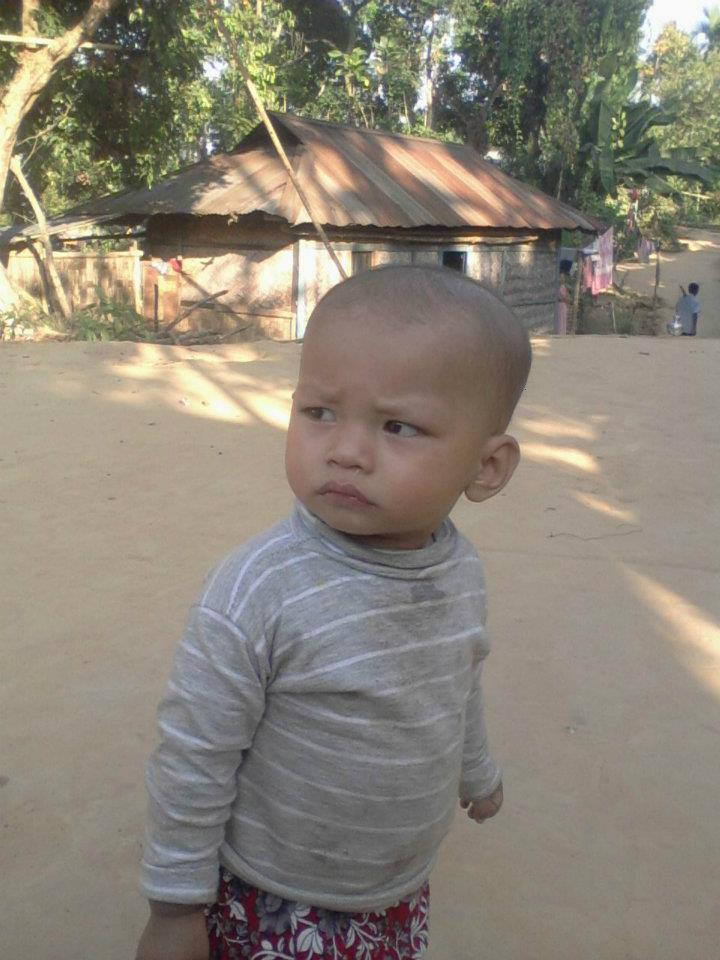
A young Khasi boy in a remote village.

The division's population is over 12 million and Bengalis make up a large majority of the region's population. The tribal and Adivasi population tend to live in secluded rural areas of the region primarily near the hills and tea gardens. They are made up of several ethnic groups such as the Bishnupriya Manipuris, Khasi, Lalengs, Tripuris, Meiteis, Garos, and Kukis. In the nineteenth century, the British brought over indigenous peoples from other parts of British India to work as tea garden labourers such as the Kurmis, Musahars, Bauris, Beens, Bonaz, Sabar and Bhumij amongst others.

=== Religion ===
Religion in Sylhet Division (2022)
Religion	Percent
Muslims	86.22%
Hindus	13.51%
Christians	0.23%
Others	0.04%

Islam is the largest religion in the whole region practised by the Bengali Muslims. Sunni Islam is the largest denomination with majority following the Hanafi school of law although some also follow the Shafi'i and Hanbali madhhabs. There are significant numbers of people who follow Sufi ideals similar to the Barelvis, the most influential is the teachings of Abdul Latif Chowdhury Fultali of Zakiganj – a descendant of one of the disciples of Shah Jalal. The revivalist Deobandi movement is also popular in the region with Jamia Tawakkulia Renga being a notable centre and many are part of the Tablighi Jamaat. Haji Shariatullah's Faraizi movement was very popular during the British period and Wahhabism is adopted by some upper-class families. The Ahmadiyya community is mostly concentrated in Selbaras, which was the ancestral home of Ahmad Toufiq Choudhury, the leader of Ahmadiyya Muslim Jama'at Bangladesh.

There is a very small minority of Shia Muslims who gather every year during Ashura for the Mourning of Muharram processions. Places of procession include the Prithimpasha Nawab Bari in Kulaura, home to a royal Shia family, as well as Rajtila.

Hinduism is the second largest religion practised by the Bengali Hindus as well as majority of the Bishnupriya Manipuri, Beens, Bhumij, Bonaz, Sabar, Lalengs and Tripuri population. Sylhet has the largest concentration of Hindus in Eastern Bengal and is a part of the Shakta pitha.

Other minority religions include Christianity (including the Roman Catholic Diocese of Sylhet and Sylhet Presbyterian Synod), Ka Niam Khasi, Sanamahism, Songsarek as well as animism. In the early 20th century, there were over a hundred Marwaris from Rajasthan that were living in Sylhet, mostly as merchants and followed Jainism.

There was a presence of Sikhism in Sylhet after Guru Nanak's visit in 1508 to spread the religion. Kahn Singh Nabha has stated that in memory of Nanak's visit, Gurdwara Sahib Sylhet was established. This Gurdwara was visited twice by Tegh Bahadur and many hukamnamas were issued to this temple by Guru Gobind Singh. In 1897, the gurdwara fell down after the earthquake.

== In popular culture ==
- In season 4, episode 6, of Call the Midwife, the midwives tend to a woman from the Sylhet Division.

== See also ==
- Divisions of Bangladesh
- Folk deities of Sylhet
- List of people from Sylhet
- Sylhet roofed turtle
- Sylhet Hara
- Sylheti Language
- Sylheti Nagari
- Haltunnabi
