= Beens =

Indo-Aryan community

Total population
- 5,000

Regions with significant populations
- Srimangal (Bangladesh) - 5,000

Languages
- Bengali and Hindi

Religion
- Hinduism

Related ethnic groups
- Indo-Aryan peoples

The Been people (Bengali: বীন, Hindi: बीन), also known as Bind (Bengali: বিন্দ), are a Hindi-speaking community that live in Srimangal, Bangladesh. They were transported to the Sylhet region in the nineteenth century by the British in order to work as tea garden labourers - an occupation which they continue to live by today. They are originally from the border region between West Bengal and Bihar. They are Hindus and maintain a distinct identity in addition to their Bangladeshi national identity, due to cultural, linguistic, geographical and historical reasons. Many have adopted the Bengali language; although only 10% of the community are actually literate in the language.

== See also ==
- History of Sylhet
