= Ali Amjad's Clock =

The Ali Amjad Clock
- আলী আমজদের ঘড়ি
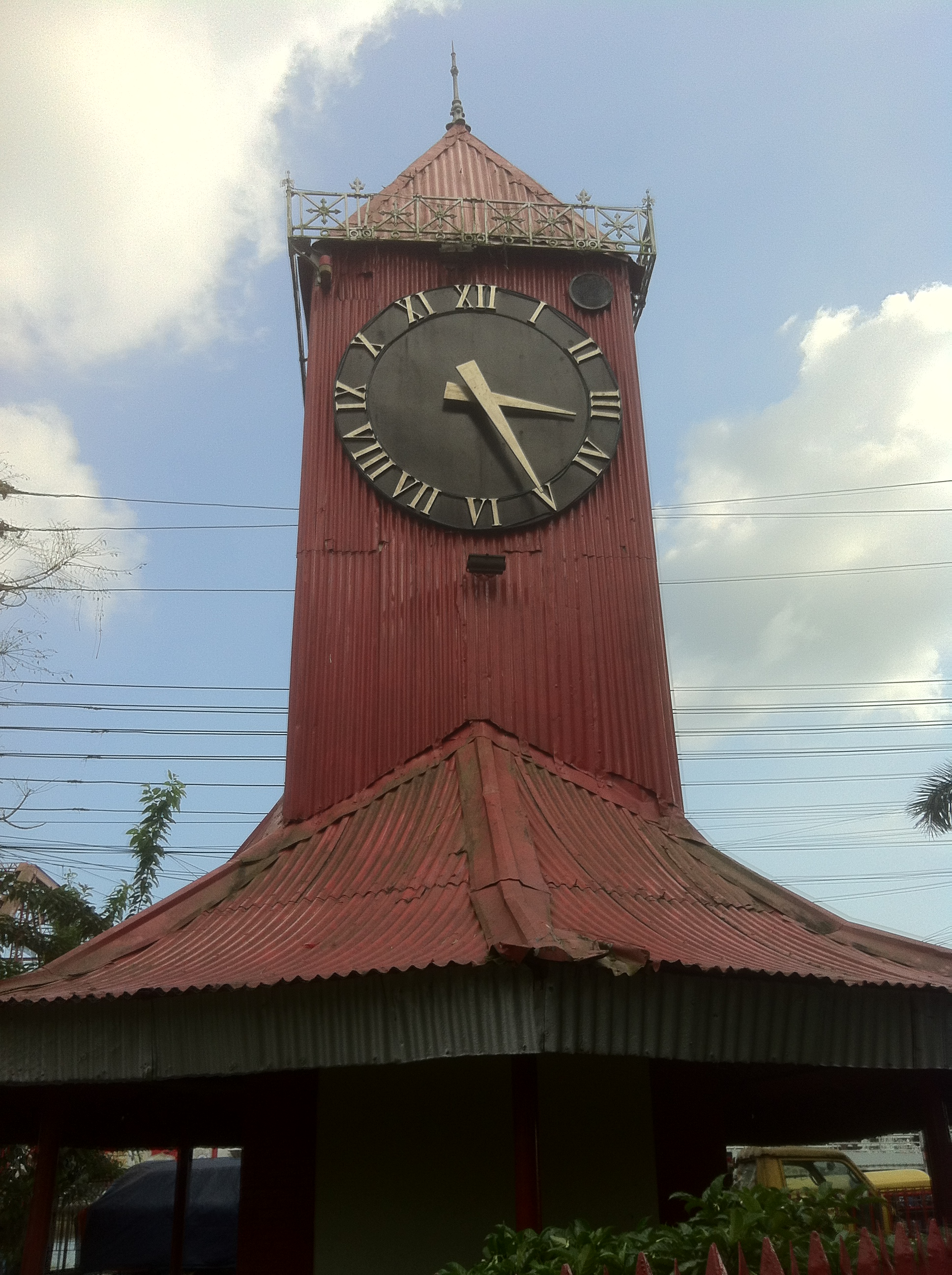
- A front view of The Ali Amjad Clock
- Interactive map of The Ali Amjad Clock
- Location: Sylhet, Bangladesh
- Coordinates: 24°53′18″N 91°52′04″E
- Designer: Nawab Moulvi Ali Ahmad Khan
- Type: Tower
- Material: Tin
- Width: 5.1 m (16.7 ft)
- Height: 7.4 m (24.3 ft)
- Opening date: 1874
- Dedicated to: Ali Amjad Khan

Ali Amjad's Clock (Bengali: আলী আমজদের ঘড়ি) is the oldest clock tower of Bangladesh and lies on the north bank of the Surma River in the northeastern city of Sylhet. The tower was founded by Nawab Ali Ahmad Khan of Prithimpassa in 1872 and named after his son, Nawab Ali Amjad Khan. It is a popular tourist attraction adjacent to the Keane Bridge and is often used in the establishing shot of films set in Sylhet.

== History ==
The tower was constructed in 1872 by Ali Amjad's father, Nawab Moulvi Ali Ahmed Khan, just two years before he was born. Nawab Ali Amjad Khan was the 8th Nawab of the Prithimpasha estate in Kulaura, Moulvibazar.

A popular old poem about the Sylhet city mentions the clock:

চাদঁনী ঘাটের সিড়িঁ, আলী আমজদের ঘড়ি, বঙ্কু বাবুর দাড়ি, আর জিতু মিয়ার বাড়ি
Channighater Shiri, Bonku Babu'r Dari, Jitu Miah'r Gari, Ar Ali Amzade'r Ghori.

This translates to "The steps of Channighat, the beard of Bonku Babu, the house of Jitu Miah, and the clock of Ali Amzad", all of which are local landmarks.

== Gallery ==
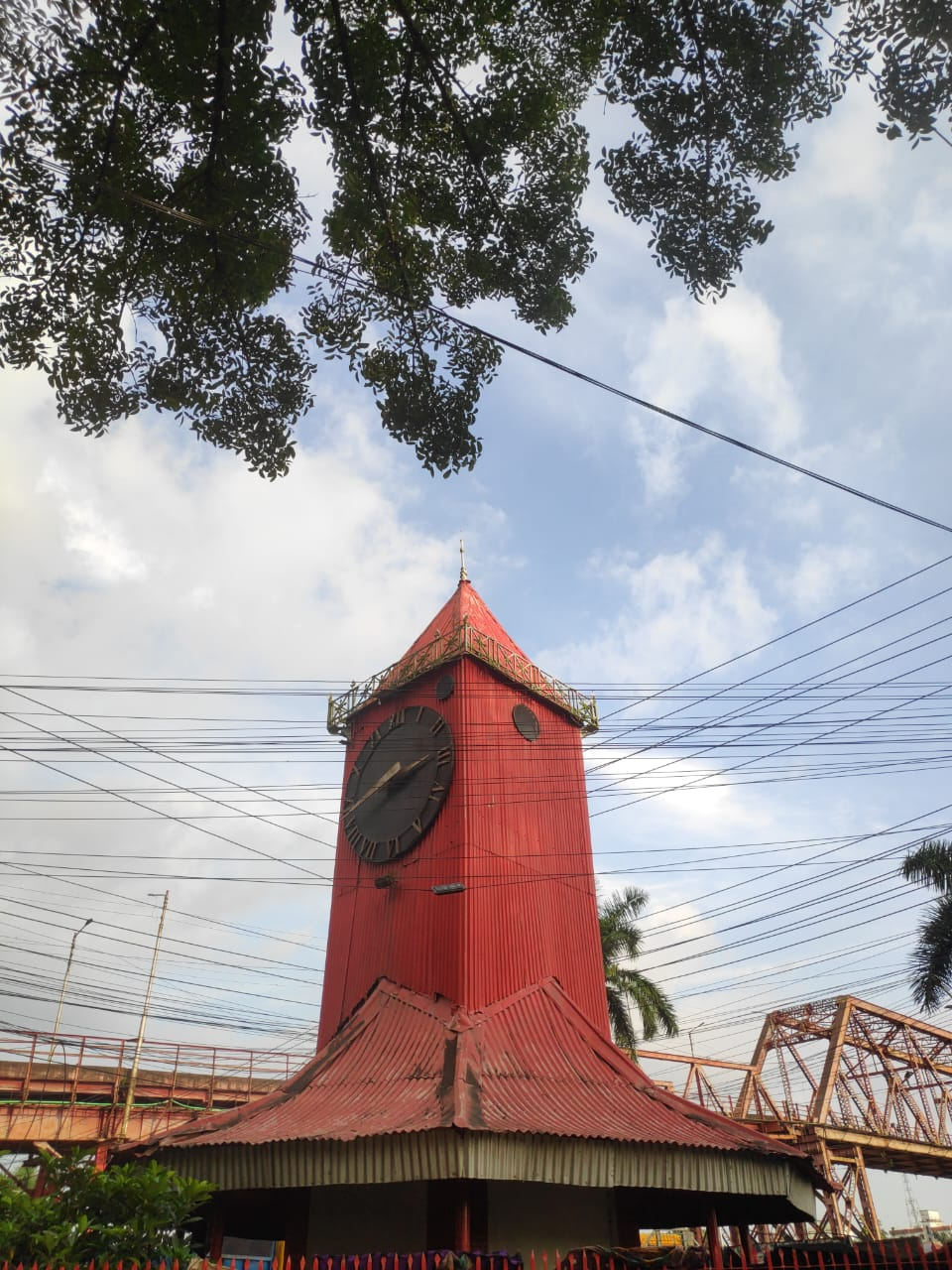

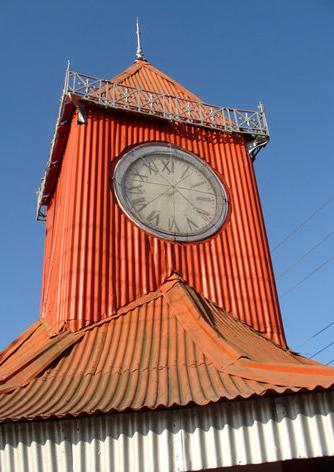

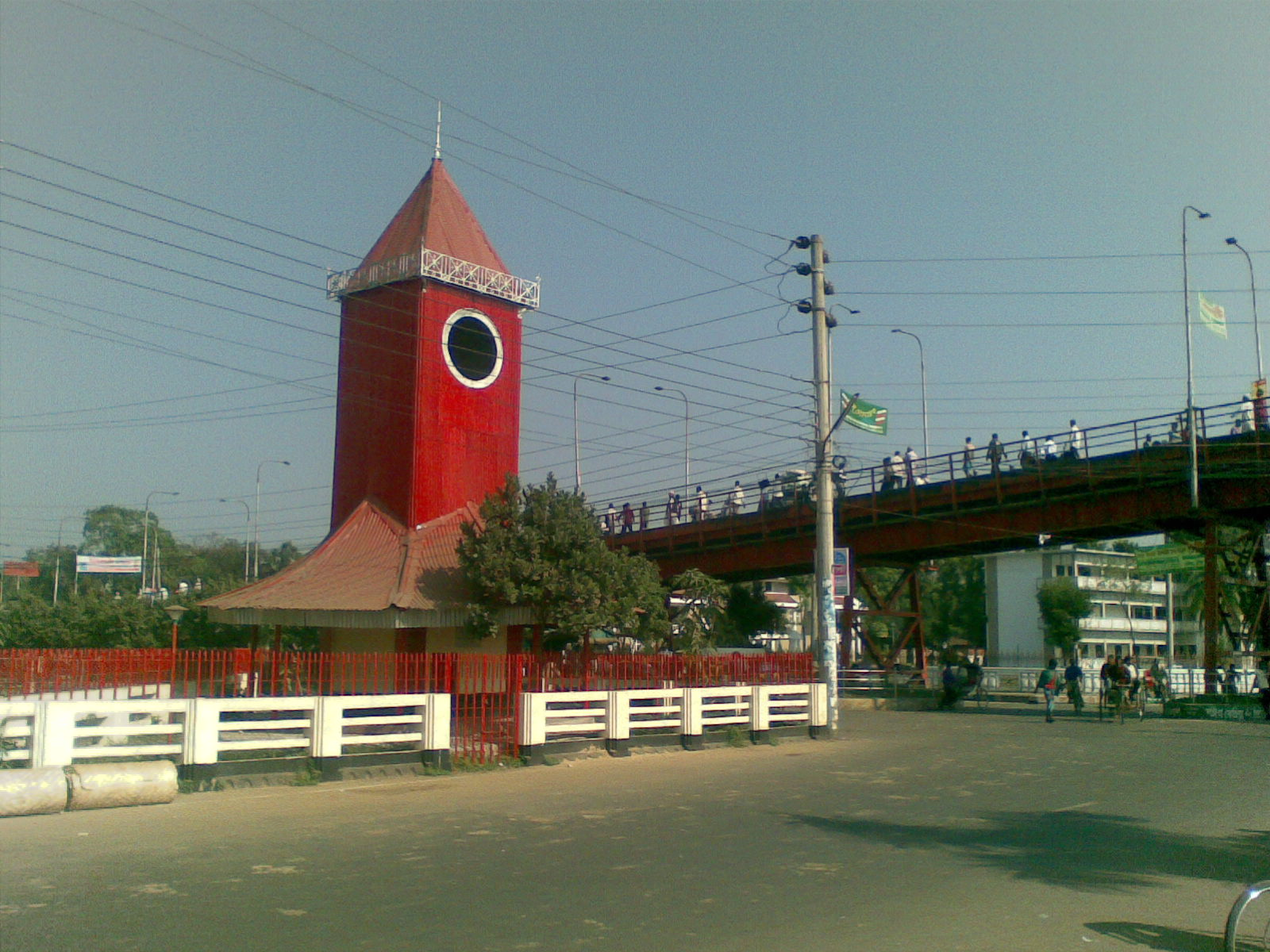
