= Keane Bridge =

Bridge in Bangladesh

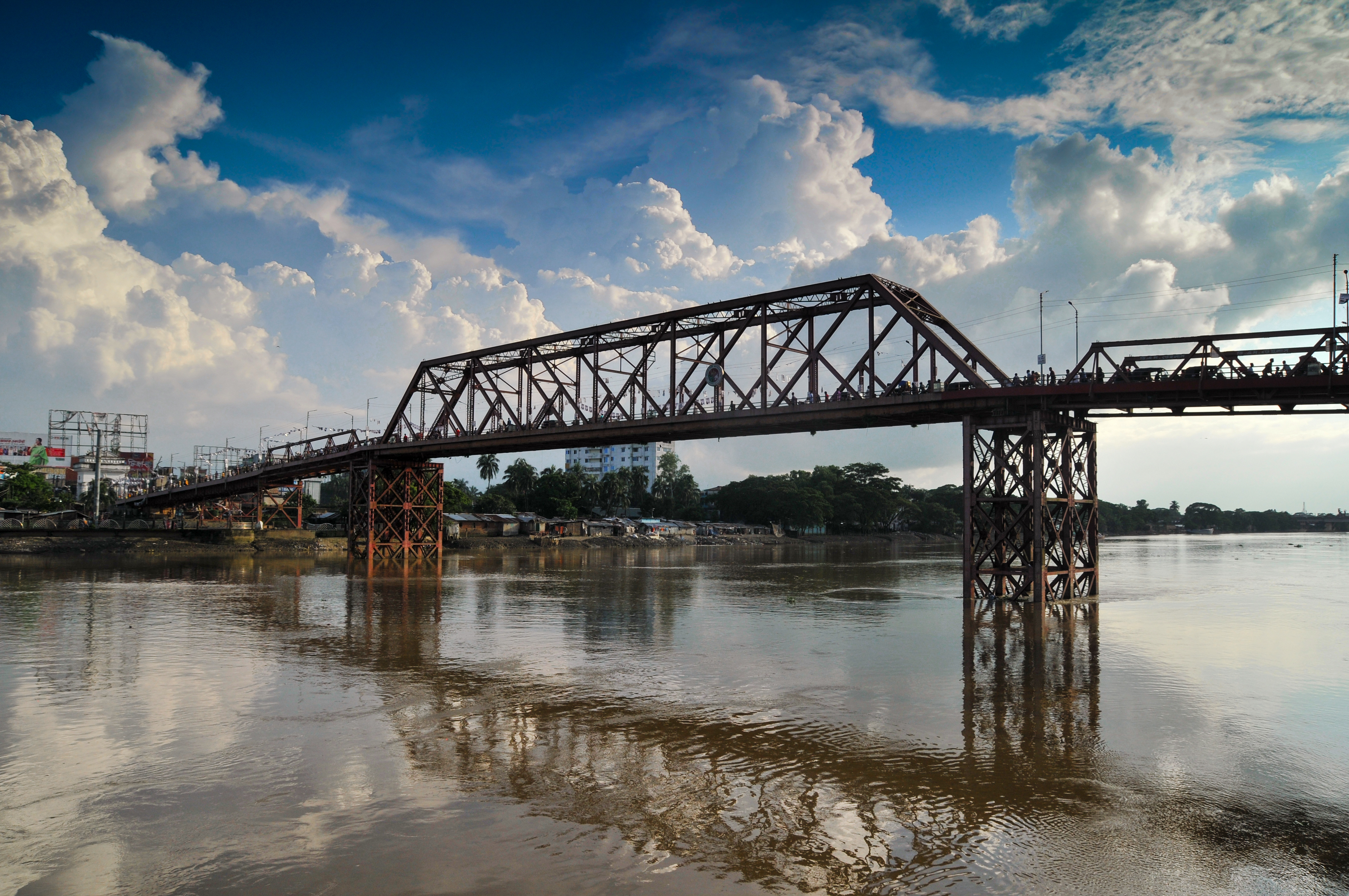
- Keane Bridge, 2015
- Coordinates: 24.8876°N 91.8681°E

Characteristics
- Total length: 350.52 m (1,150.0 ft)
- Width: 5.4 m (17.7 ft)

History
- Opened: 1936

The Keane Bridge is a notable landmark of Sylhet city, Bangladesh. This bridge is called the gateway to Sylhet city.

After Earl Robert Miller, the ambassador of USA to Bangladesh, visited the bridge and recommended its sole use as a pedestrian bridge, no vehicles are allowed to use the bridge. It is therefore the longest pedestrian bridge in Bangladesh.

== Location and description ==
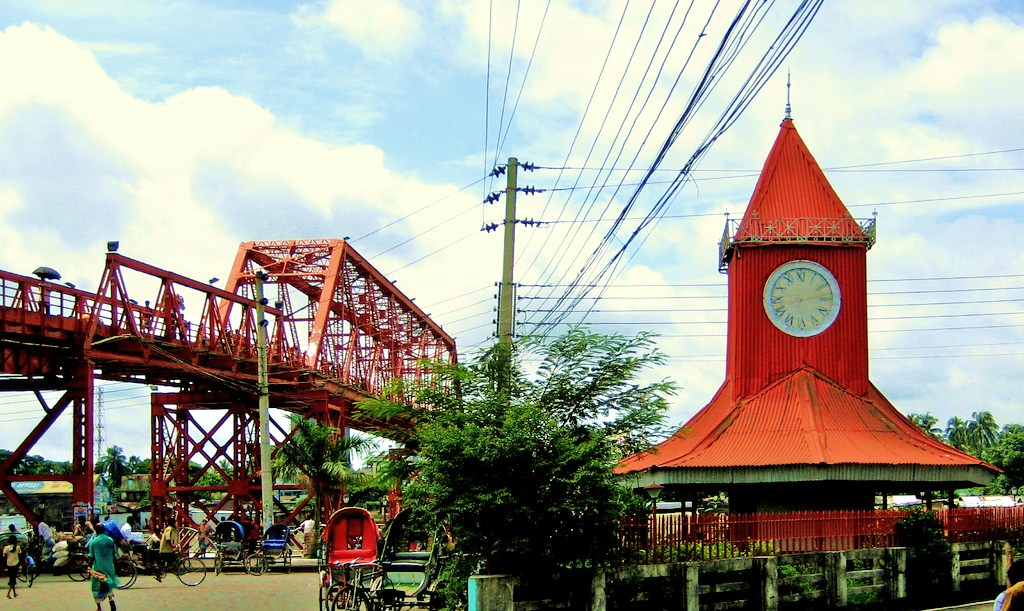
Keane Bridge and Ali Amjad's Clock

This bridge is located over the Surma River in the middle of Sylhet city which is 246 kilometres (153 mi) northeast of Dhaka, the capital of Bangladesh.

== History ==
This bridge was built in 1936 and is named after Sir Michael Keane who was the Irish Governor of Assam from 1932 to 1937.

== Structure ==
It is made of iron and steel and looks like a bow. The bridge is 1150 feet long and 18 feet breadth. About Taka 5.6 million was spent to build the bridge.

== Damage and repair ==
During the Bangladesh Liberation War the bridge was blown off with dynamite by the Pakistan Army and damaged. It was repaired in 1977.

== Gallery ==
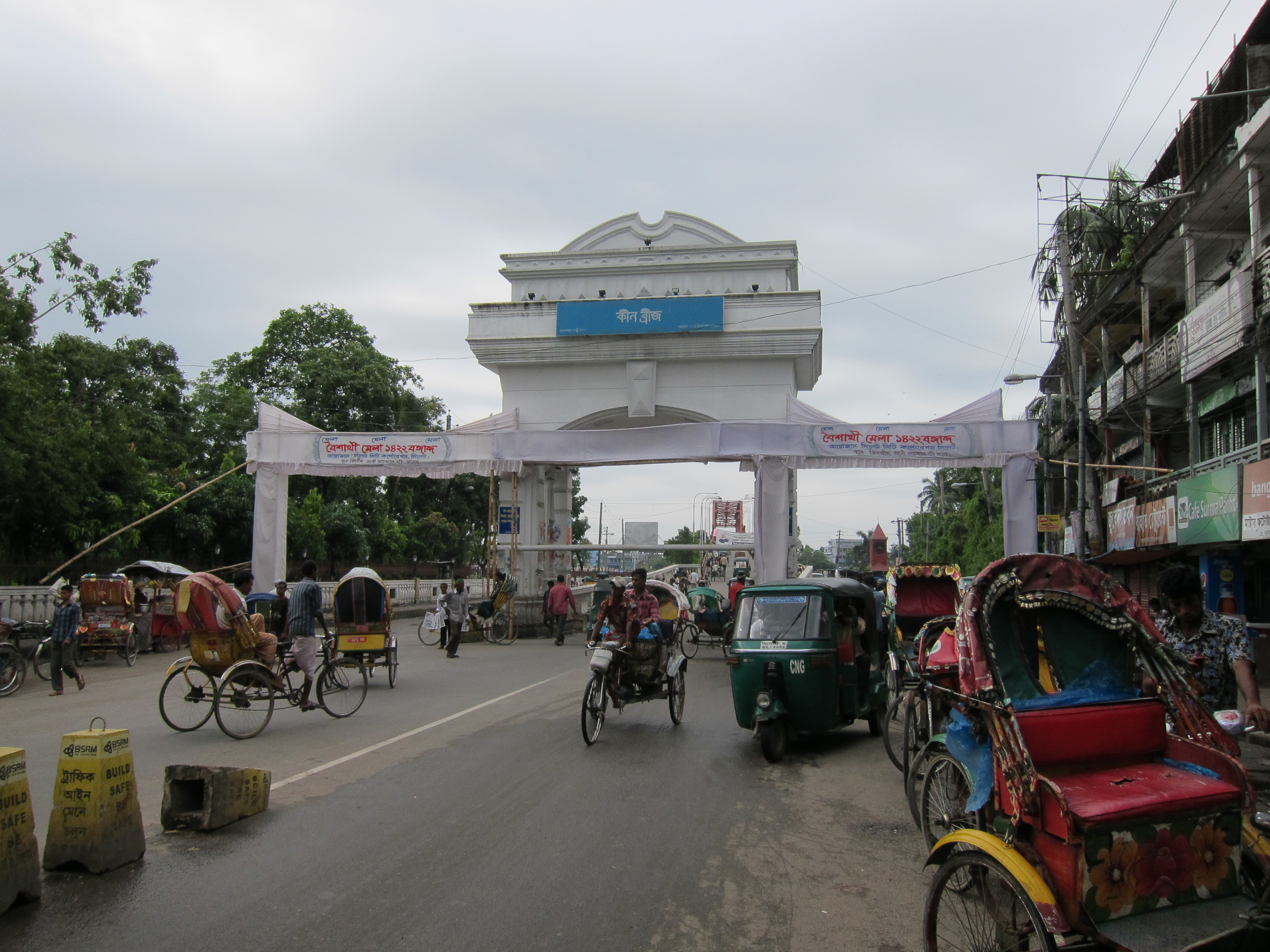
North entrance

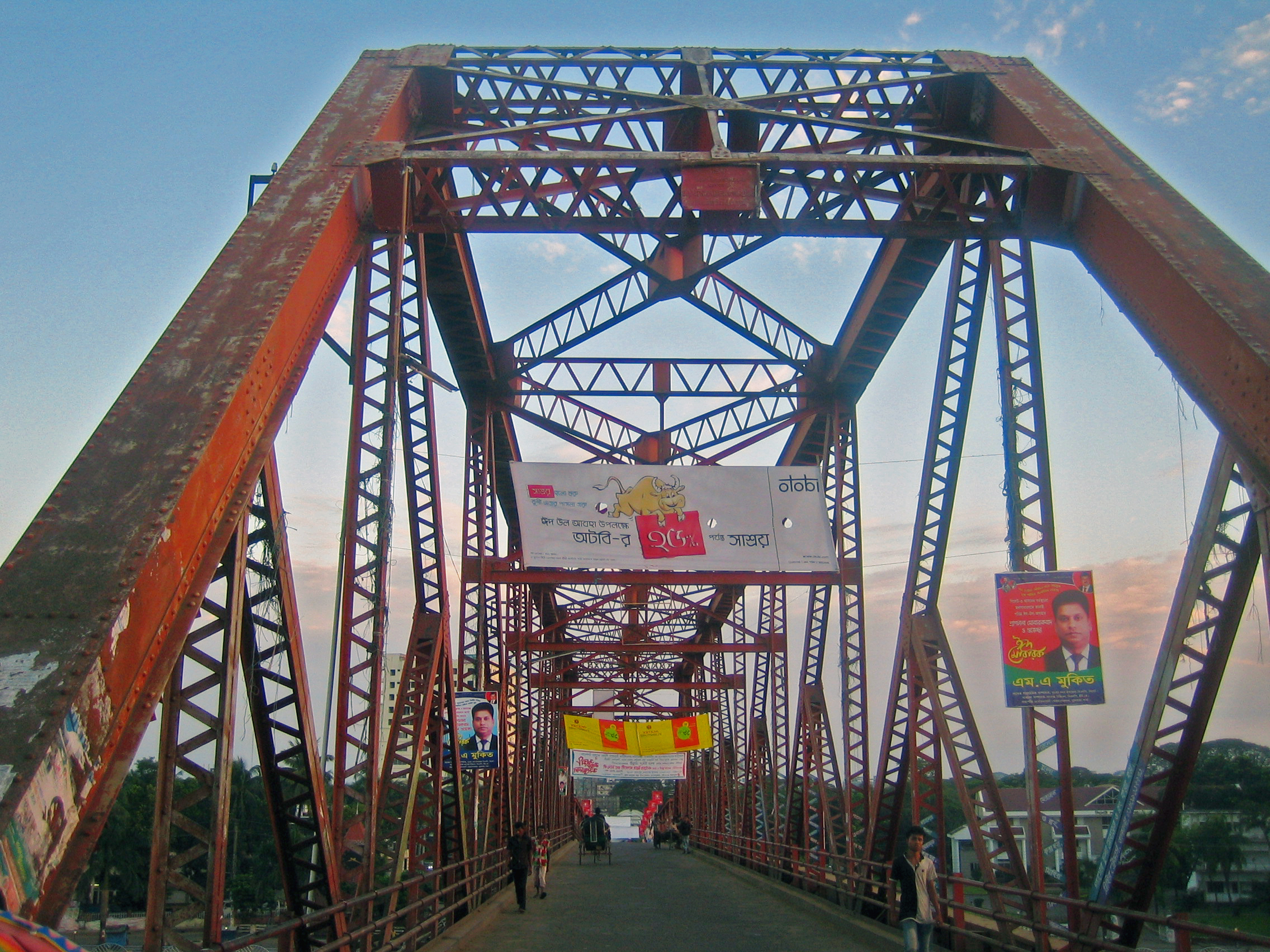

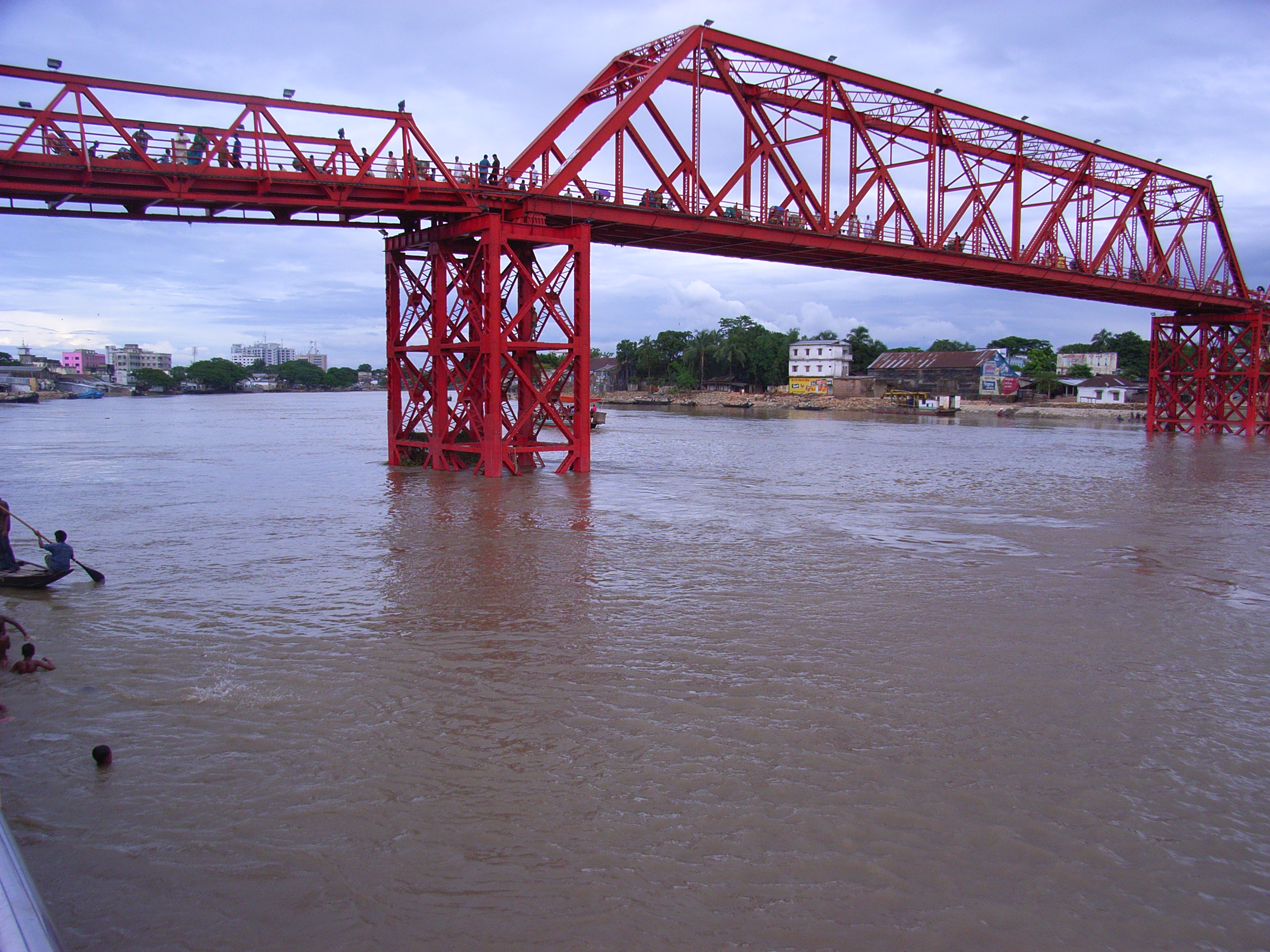
From south

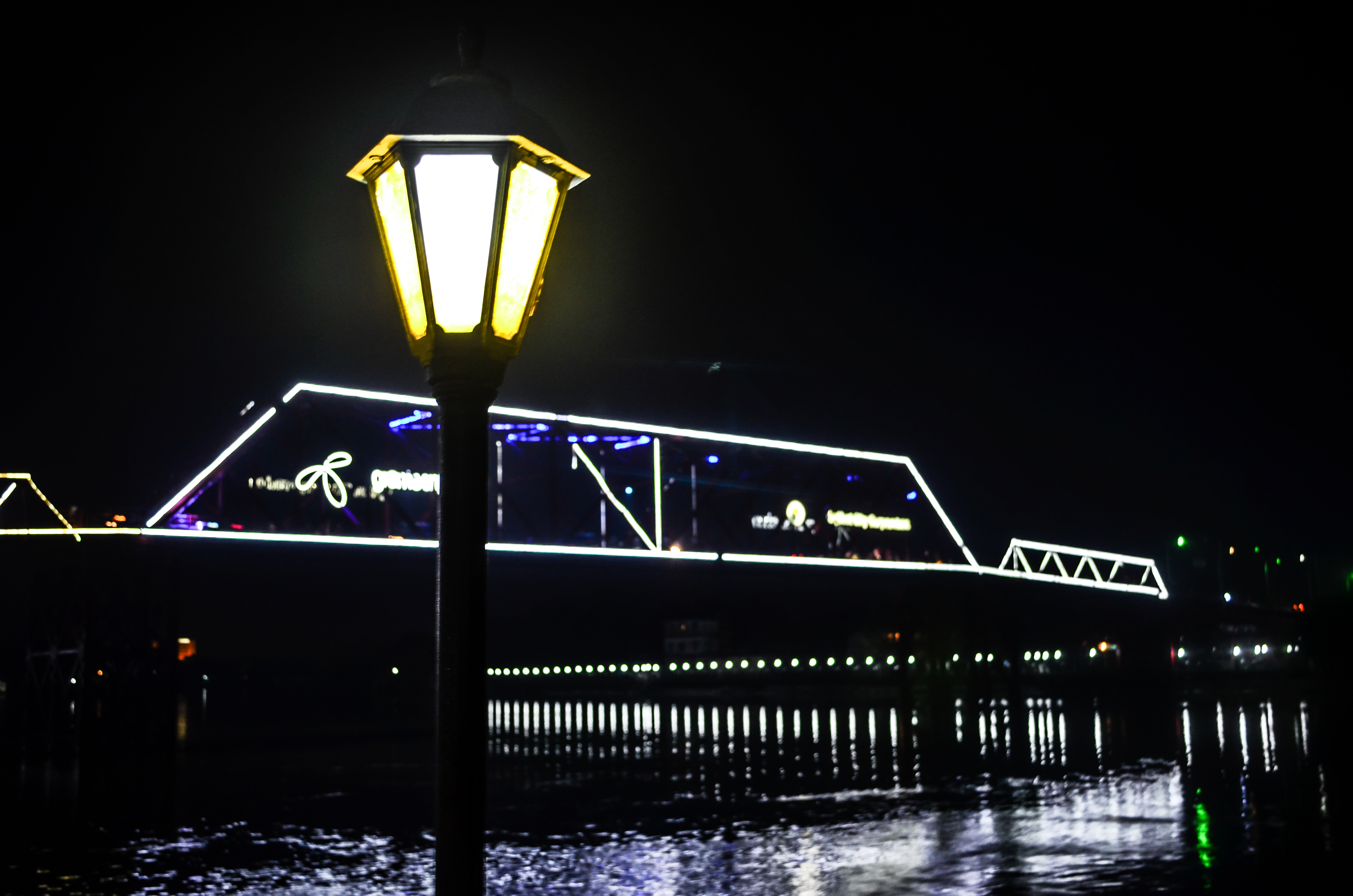
Keane Bridge views at night

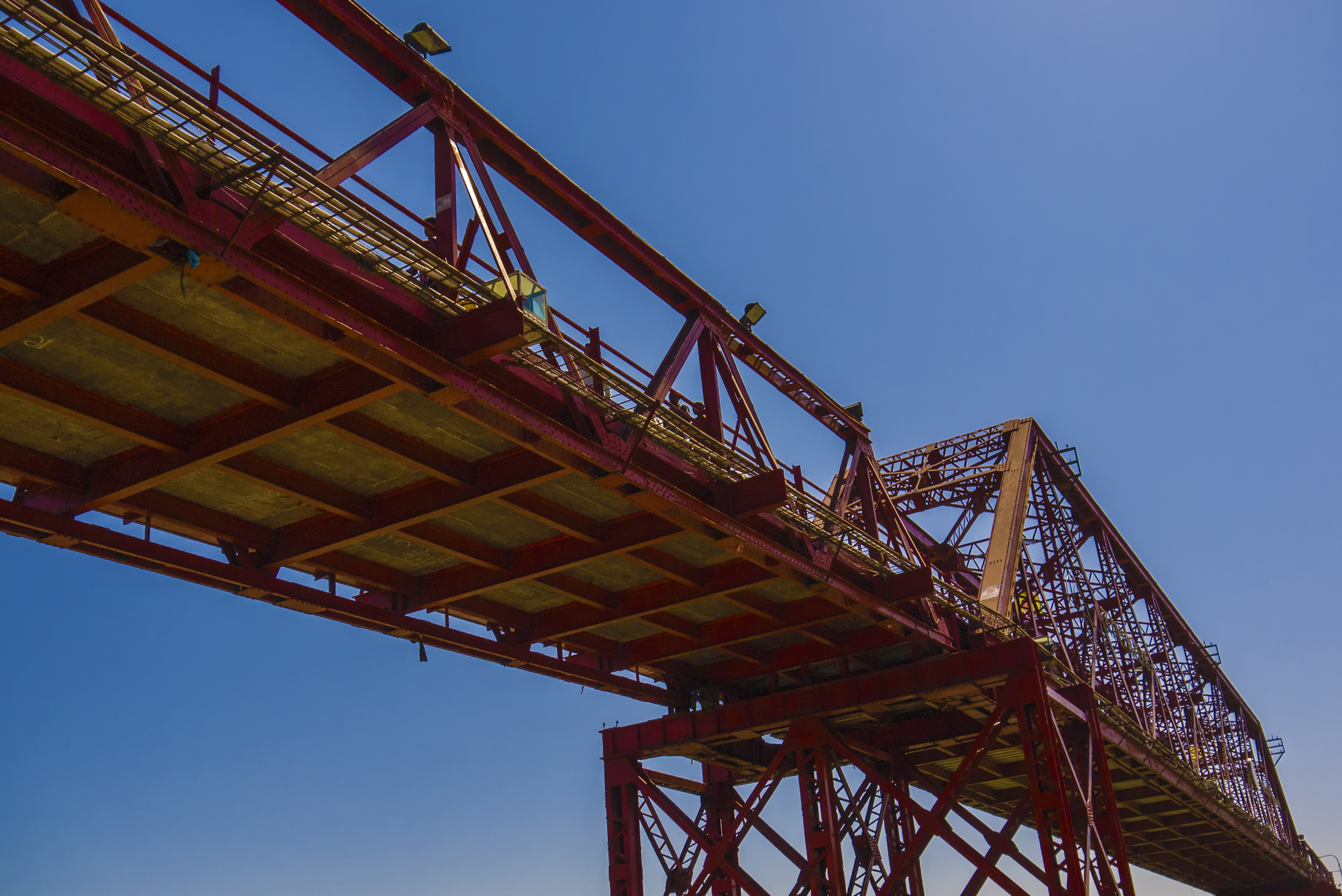

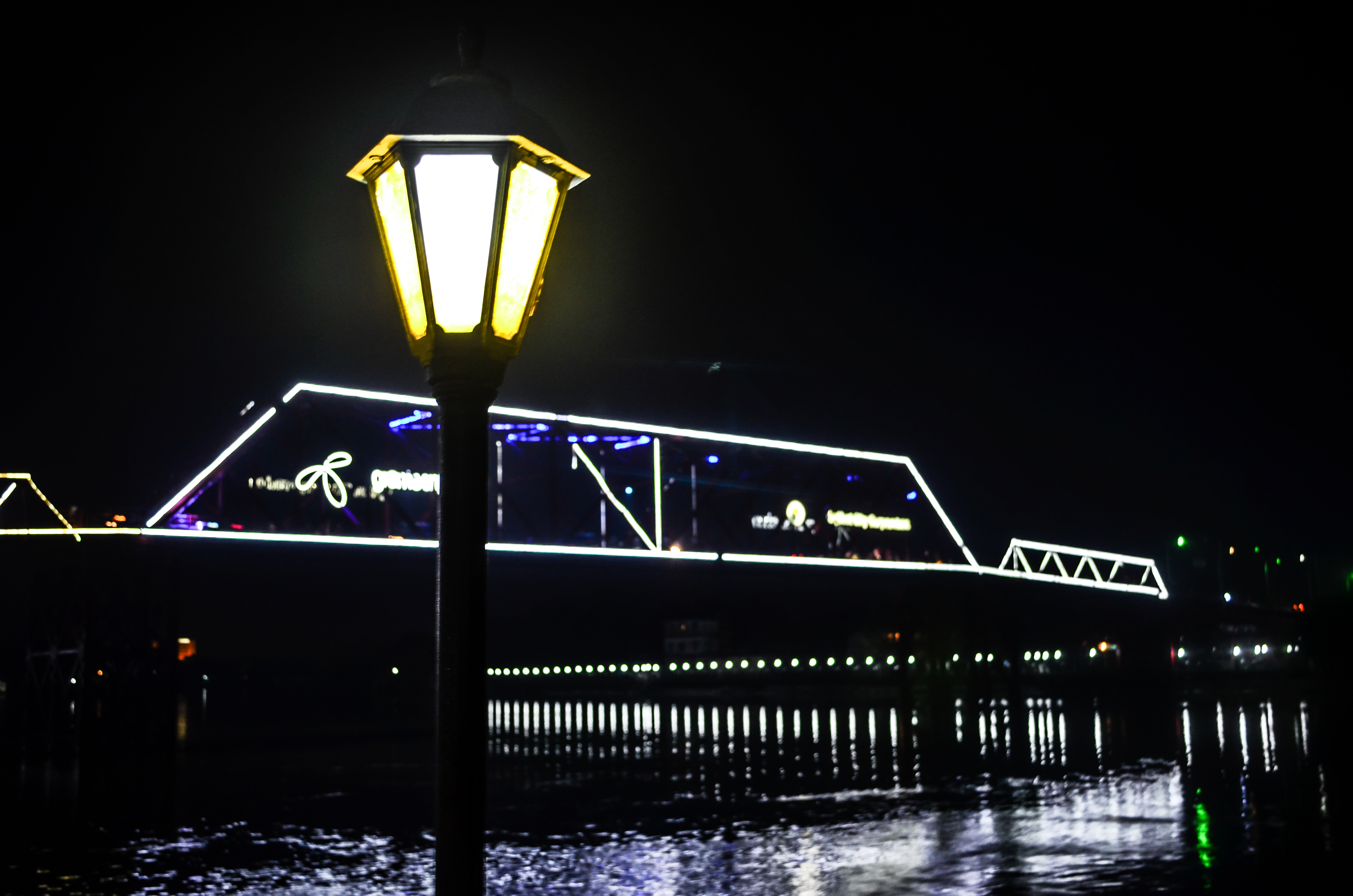
Night View Of Keane Bridge
