= Sculpture of Bangladesh =

Sculpture has been an indispensable part of Bangladeshi culture. Bangladesh was at times an important centre influencing stone sculpture in South Asia, especially in the post-Gupta and medieval periods. Terracotta reliefs are a particular local characteristic of Hindu temples (with figures) and mosques (without figures) in recent centuries.

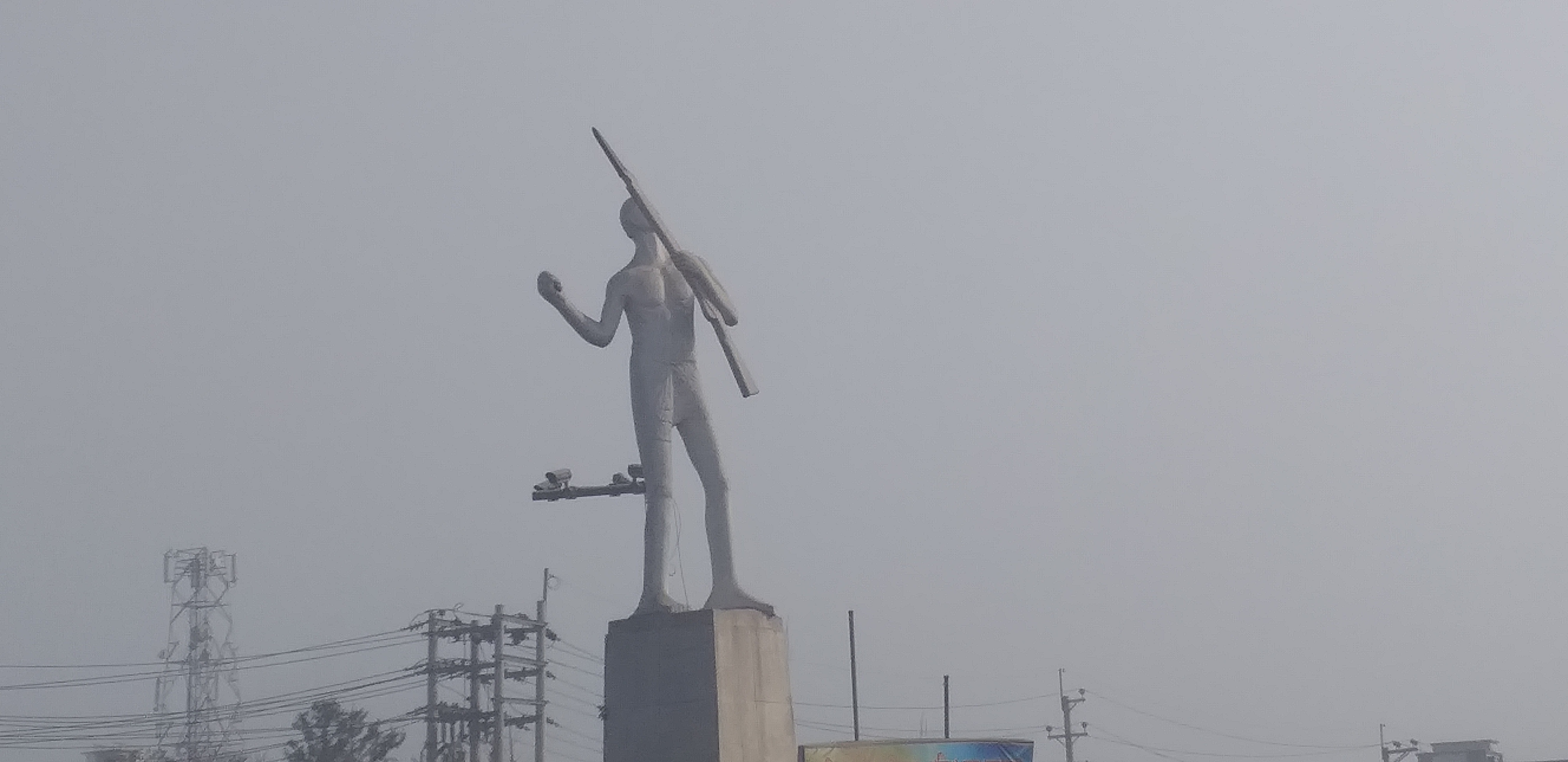
Jagroto Chowrongi

The earliest sculptures in Bangladesh discovered so far date back to the 3rd century BC. Since ancient times, sculptures have been serving as a substantial manifestation of the profound heritage of Bangladeshi culture and history.

== Historic significance ==
Sculptures have been a key of source of rendering the historic identity of the ancient Bangladesh. Even though the art of sculptures in Bangladesh began almost 2500 years ago, it mostly flourished during the Gupta, Pala and Sena dynasty all of which belong to the early Middle Ages (1–1200 CE). Bengali Artists of Bengal Subah pioneered Ivory arts.

=== Gupta sculptures ===
The Gupta rulers were devoted Vaishnavas, and early Gupta sculptures are found to be mostly representations of Vishnu or any of his incarnations. The earliest example of this seems to be the Vishnu from Machmoil Bagmara in the district of Rajshahi carved in grey sandstone. The image shows a broken form of the god in a strict frontally standing pose. Though modelling and iconic features betray its early Gupta style, its aesthetic attainment is so negligible that it may be stylistically placed in a point of transition between the Kusana and the Gupta phases. The image is preserved with quite a number of other Vishnus of the Gupta period in the Varendra Research Museum. The Gupta sculptures of Bangladesh are mostly icons and their forms were determined by the characteristics of the gods as prescribed by the priests of Central India.

=== Pala sculptures ===
During more than four hundred years of Pala rule (8th–12th century AD), many centres of sculptural art flourished simultaneously in different regions of the extensive empire of Bangladesh. The products of these centres were not only varied but also numerous. Thousands of sculptures of this period have been discovered and they now form part of the collections of a number of museums in Bangladesh. Many of them have also found their ways into a number of museums in Europe and America. Most of these sculptures have been found through the excavations in Somapura Mahavihara. Pala sculpture derives its origins from the late Gupta style, but later on deviated from it.

=== Sena sculptures ===
A large number of sculptures representing Hindu gods and goddesses belong to the phase of artistic activity initiated under the Sena rulers (c 1097–1223 AD). From the artistic point of view, Sena sculpture is a continuation of the Pala style in vogue till the late 11th century AD. The slender body form of the late Pala period sculpture is retained in the Sena period, but the modelling quality shows a marked deterioration.

=== Mughal sculptures ===
Ivory sculptures were prevalent during Mughal rule in Bengal. The Mughals greatly patronised this industry. Emperor jahangir mentions in his autobiography that he permanently employed a number of ivory craftsmen.

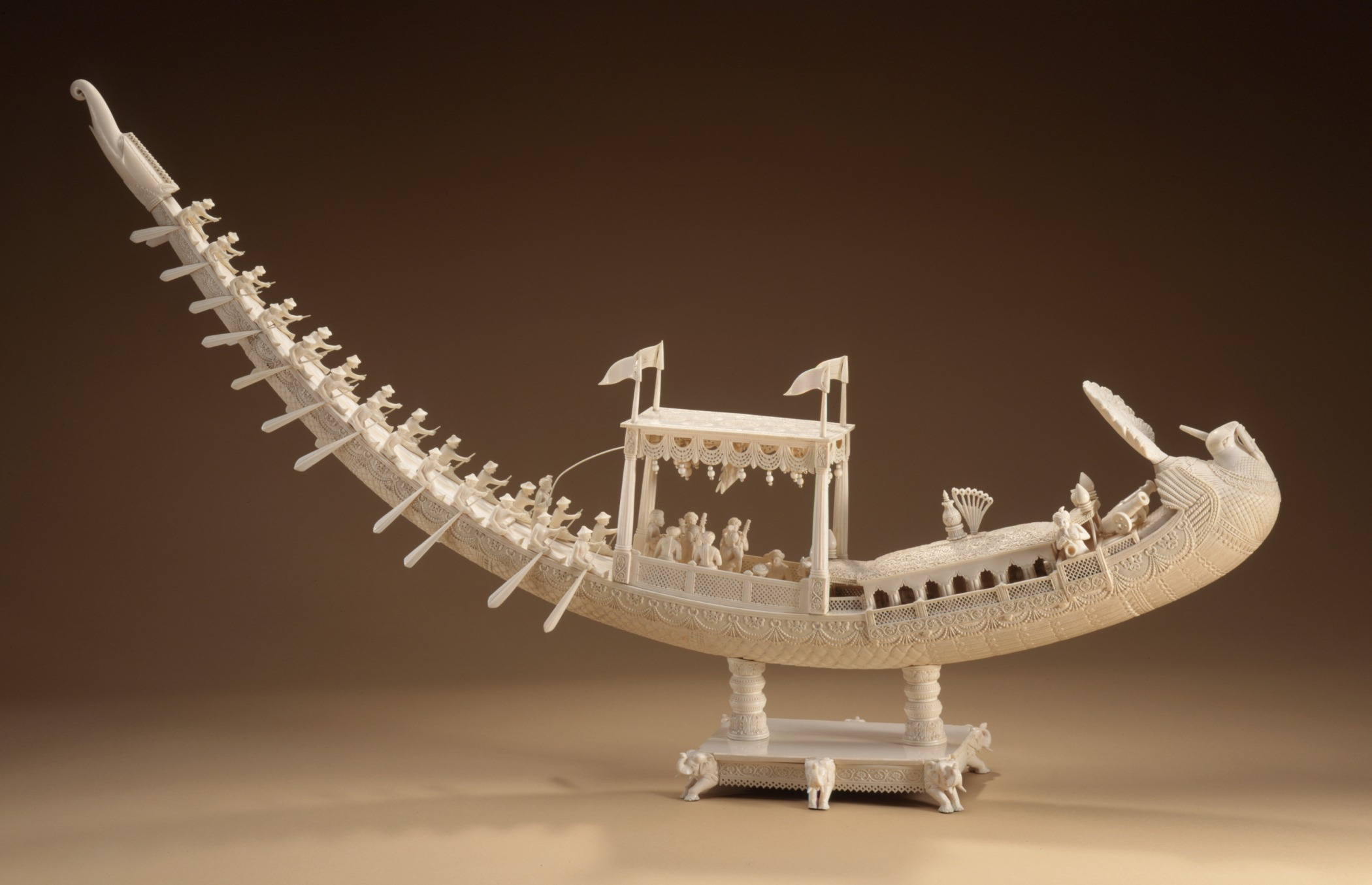
Ivory sculpture of Royal peacock barge of Nawabs of Bengal

== Materials ==
Most of the ancient sculptures discovered in Bangladesh are made of Ivory, terracotta, bronze, black stone, etc. The earliest sculptures were made of terracotta dating as early as 3rd century BC. The trend of using bronze for sculptures started from the 7th century. The black stone sculptures also originated from that period.

=== Ivory ===
The ivory craft underwent some changes after the advent of the Muslims. Emperor Jahangir mentions in his autobiography that he permanently employed a number of ivory craftsmen.

=== Terracotta ===
The history of terracotta sculpture in Bangladesh starts from the Mauryan age (324–187 BC). It is believed that in pre-Mauryan times it was the Matrika (Mother-Goddess) statues that dominated. From the presentation and aesthetic standard of the Mauryan sculpture it can be inferred that the art had a long and continuous heritage. These sculptures became much more elegant, refined, well-shaped and worldly in the 2nd and 1st centuries BC. Decorative carved or moulded plaques of terracotta (the same material as the brick) are a special feature of Bengal Sultanate art. Muslim terracotta art in Bengal thus developed a hybrid style with a distinct personality of its own. Terracotta was raised to the status of a major art in Muslim architectural ornamentation.

=== Bronze ===
The trend of using bronze in sculptures started in the 7th century CE mainly from the Chittagong region. As the region was dominated by believers of Buddhism, most of these earliest bronze sculptures were depictions of Gautam Buddha. However, later on sculptures depicting the Hindu deities were also made with bronze.

=== Black stone ===
Stone sculptures so far discovered from Bangladesh that are assignable to the first three centuries of the Common era are few. These sculptures in general represent a style, which is, in the development of the art in North India, recognised as related to the Kusanas. The centre of the art was Mathura, which evolved during the period the images of the deities worshipped by the followers of the three major religions of the time, namely, Brahmanism, Buddhism and Jainism.

== Religious depictions ==
The Bangladeshi sculptures, especially those belonging to the ancient and early Middle Ages mostly depict the Hindu deities and the deities worshiped by the Buddhists, especially Gautam Buddha. Thus, these sculptures can be divided in two major categories considering their religious significance.

=== Hindu sculptures ===
Sculptures depicting the Hindu deity fall in this category. The beginning of the art of Hindu sculptures is believed to be from the Gupta period. Most of these sculptures depicts the Hindu deity called Vishnu. Many of them also depict the deities namely Durga, Brahma, Ganesha and others. Mahishamardini figure from Sarsabaz, Bogra, now in the Mahasthangarh Museum is the most magnificent early image of the deity not only from Bangladesh but from the Indian subcontinent.

=== Buddhist sculptures ===
These sculptures mostly depict the Gautam Buddha and Buddhist believes. The oldest Buddhist sculptures in Bangladesh are believed to be the belongings of the ancient kingdom of Pundravardhana. These sculptures are discovered from the archaeological sites, most of which situated in the Rajshahi and Rangpur region of the country.

== Modern sculptures ==
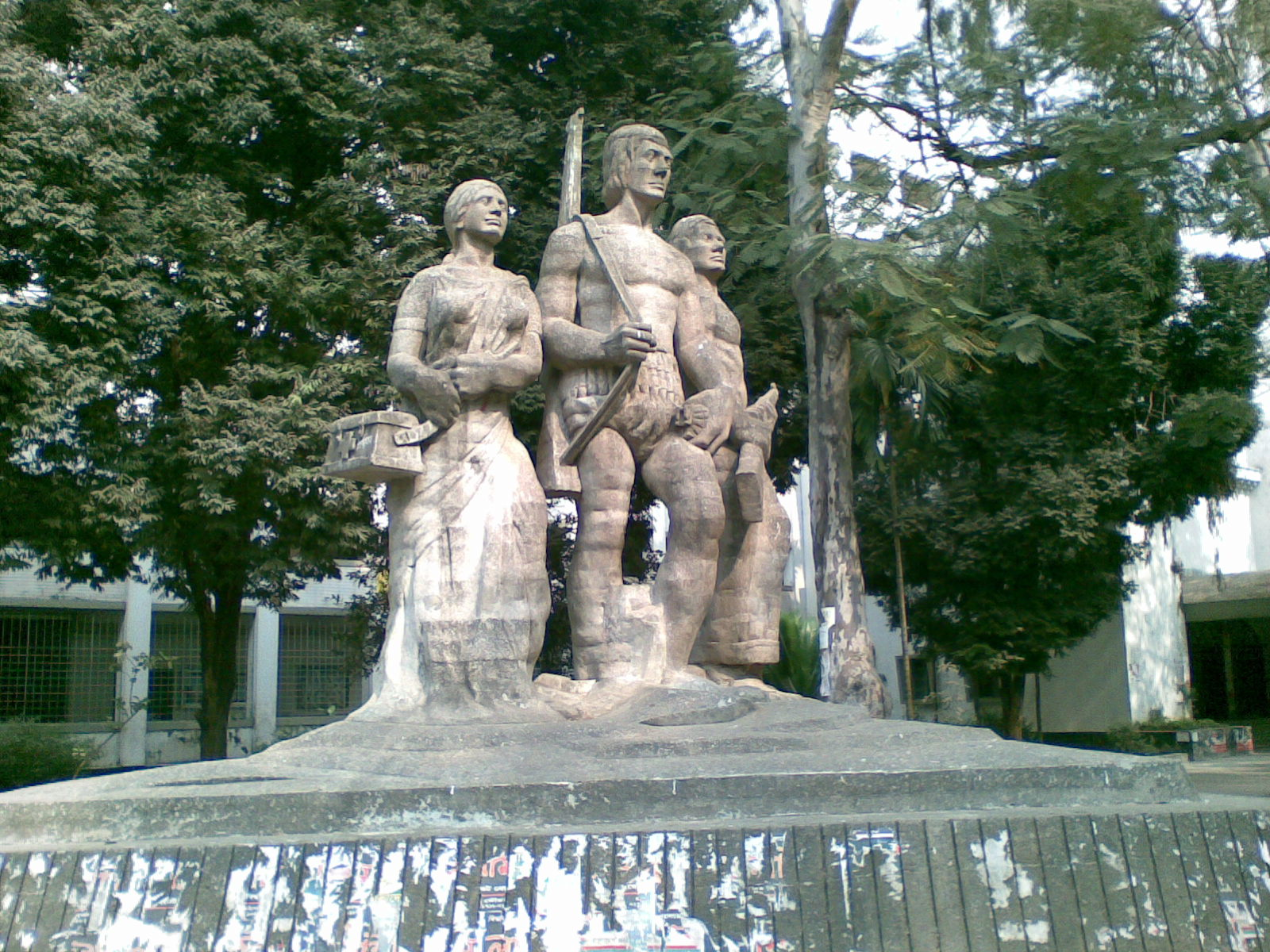
Aparajeyo Bangla

Sculptures, created after the independence of Bangladesh can be referred as modern sculptures. Most of these sculptures depict the gallant struggle of Bangladeshis during the Bangladesh liberation war. Some notable sculptures depicting the liberation war are Aparajeyo Bangla, Shabash Bangladesh, Jagroto Chowrongi, Pataka Ekattor by Rupam Roy, Imran Hossain Piplu and Muhammad Ziaul Huq Shimul etc. Nitun Kundu, Shyamal Choudhury, Mrinal Haque are some of the notable modern sculptors.
