= Jagdal =

Jagdal may refer to:

== Places ==
- Jagdal Union, Derai, Bangladesh
- Jagdal Union, Magura Sadar, Bangladesh

== People and language ==
- Jagdal, variant form of Jadgal people
- Jagdal, variant form of Jadgali language
