= Bhatipara =

- village
- Location of Bhatipara in Bangladesh
- Coordinates: 24°52′11″N 91°16′07″E
- Country: Bangladesh
- District: Sunamganj District
- Division: Sylhet Division

Area
  - Total: 37.9 km^{2} (14.6 sq mi)
- Elevation: 1 m (3.3 ft)

Population (2011)
  - Total: 19,865
  - Density: 524/km^{2} (1,360/sq mi)

Languages
- Time zone: BST
- PIN: 767042

Bhatipara (Bengali: ভাটিপাড়া) is a historical village, in Sunamganj District, Sylhet Division, Bangladesh. It is governed under Bhatipara Union in Derai Upazila. It is 61 km (38 mi) south of Sylhet and 155 km (96 mi) from the capital, Dhaka.

== Historical places ==
Bhatipara has a rich history and contains a number of heritage buildings, including the Zamidar Bari mosque, which dates back to the 19th century. This mosque is a significant landmark reflecting the architectural style and cultural heritage of the region.

== See also ==
- List of villages in Bangladesh
