= Jatichar =

Coordinates: 24°49′22″N 91°19′34″E

Jati জটিচর
- Village
- Jatichar
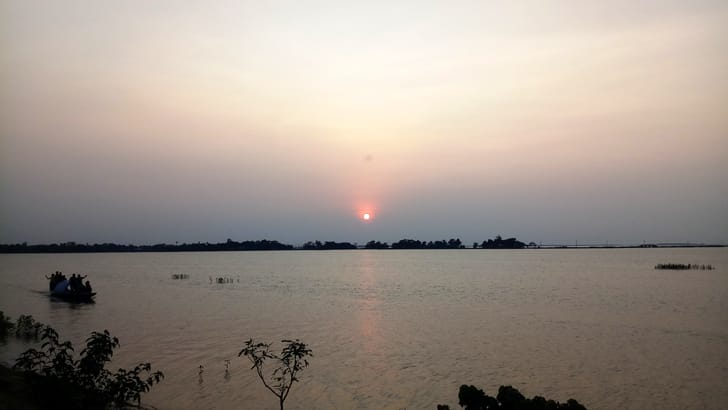
- Jatichar Haor View in Rainy Session 2019
- Interactive map of Jati

Government
  - Type: Union
  - Body: Rajanagar Union
  - Chairperson: Johirul Islam

Jatichar (Bengali: জটিচর) is a village and mouza under Rajanagar Union at Derai Upazila in Sunamganj District of Sylhet Division of Bangladesh.

== Demographics ==
The village has a small population of 603 residents.

== Education ==
Educational facilities in Jatichar are limited, with primary education being the main focus. There are not any primary or secondary school in this village, children often travel to nearby towns for higher education.
