= Derai Upazila =

Derai দিরাই
- Upazila
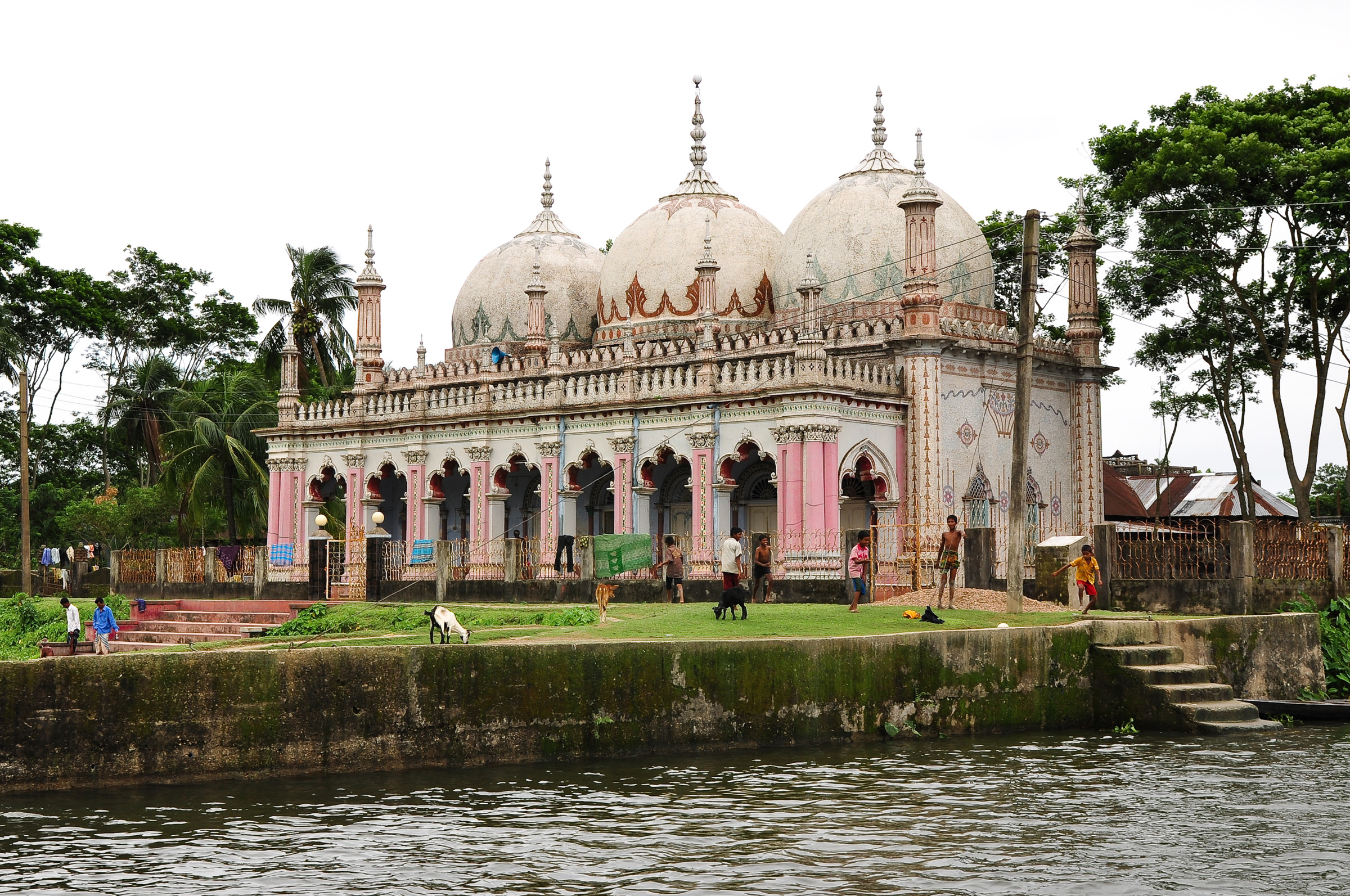
- Mosque in Bhatipara Zamindar Bari

- Country: Bangladesh
- Division: Sylhet
- District: Sunamganj
- Thana: 1942
- Upazila: 1982

Government
  - MP (Sunamganj-2): Nasir Uddin Chowdhury
  - Upazila Chairman: Vacant (ad interim)

Area
  - Total: 420.93 km^{2} (162.52 sq mi)

Population (2022)
  - Total: 253,705
  - Density: 602.72/km^{2} (1,561.1/sq mi)
- Time zone: UTC+6 (BST)
- Postal code: 3040
- Website: www.derai.sunamganj.gov.bd

Derai Upazila mauza geocode map

Derai (Bengali: দিরাই) is an upazila (sub-district) of the Sunamganj District in northeastern Bangladesh, part of the Sylhet Division.

== History ==
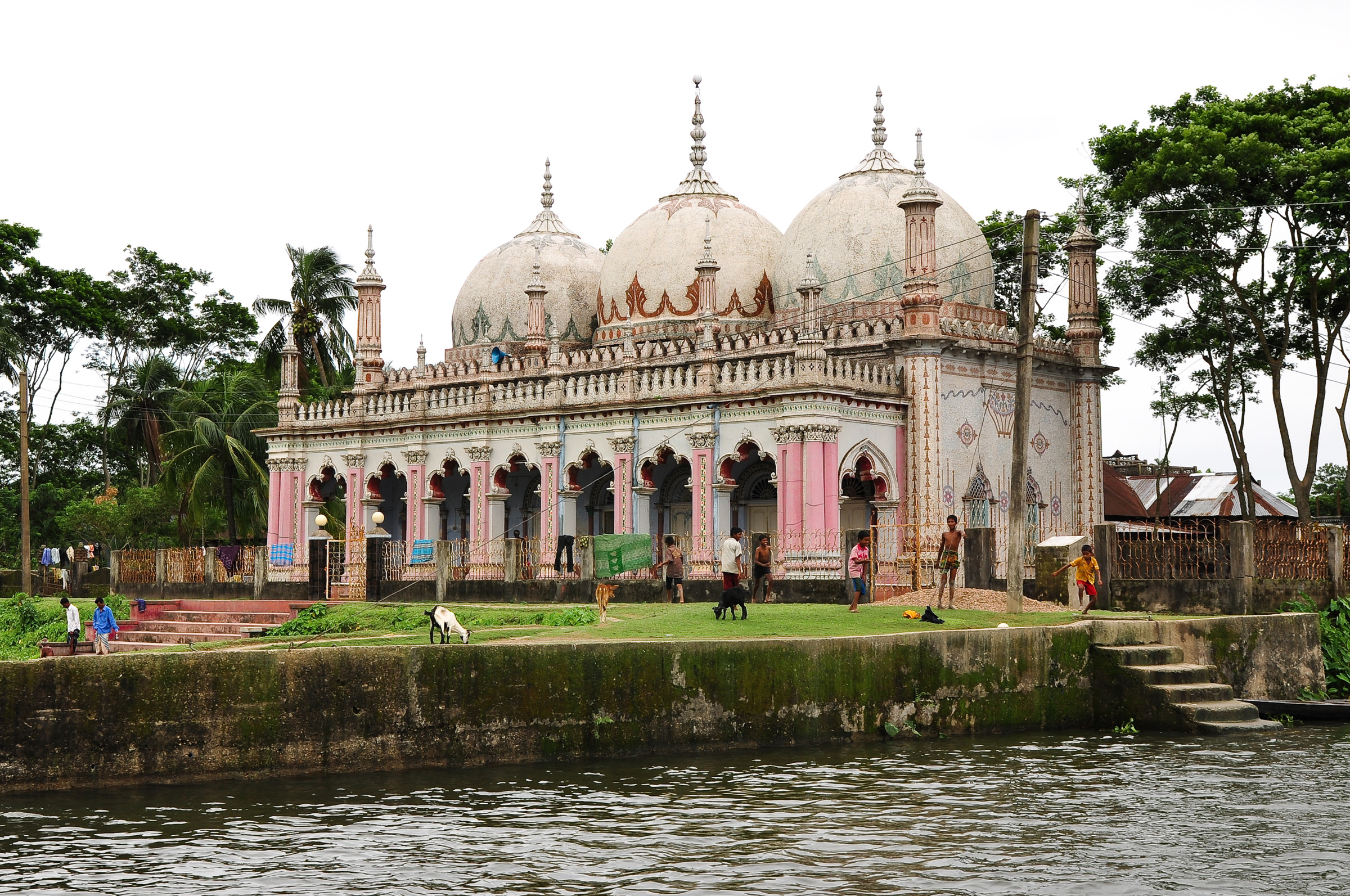
The Zamindar Bari Mosque of Bhatipara dates back to the 19th century.

Derai was previously known as Babaganj Bazar. It was home to two influential Hindu residents; Jitarāma and Dvidarāma, who renamed the area to Derai Bazar. On 10 December 1892, the Assam Gazette notification #5954 recognised the name of the area as Derai. In 1938, the Nankar Rebellion started in Derai and surrounding areas. Derai was made a thana in 1942.

During the Bangladesh Liberation War of 1971, a brawl took place in Derai between the Pakistan Army and Bengali freedom fighting forces. Among the freedom fighters here, Commander Ataur Rahman and Abdul Khaliq were wounded with Azimullah, Kuti Miah and Gopendra Das being killed.

Derai was heavily affected by the 1974 floods and that of 1988. The Jamiah Hafizia Hussainiya Madrasa was founded in 1978. In 1982, Derai thana was made an upazila. The 2004 Indian Ocean earthquake and tsunami was also very damaging to Derai.

== Demographics ==
Religions in Derai Upazila (2022)
Religion	Percent
Islam	74.54%
Hinduism	25.44%
Other or not stated	0.02%

According to the 2022 Bangladeshi census, Derai Upazila had 49,740 households and a population of 253,705. 11.32% of the population were under 5 years of age. Derai had a literacy rate (age 7 and over) of 67.69%: 68.93% for males and 66.50% for females, and a sex ratio of 97.52 males for every 100 females. 45,339 (17.87%) lived in urban areas.

According to the 2011 Census of Bangladesh, Derai Upazila had 45,040 households and a population of 243,690. 71,432 (29.31%) were under 10 years of age. Derai had a literacy rate (age 7 and over) of 37.13%, compared to the national average of 51.8%, and a sex ratio of 987 females per 1000 males. 36,183 (14.85%) lived in urban areas.

As of the 2001 Bangladesh census, Derai has a population of 202791; male 105252, female 97539; Muslim 144136, Hindu 58576, Christian 33 and others 46. Males constitute 51.38% of the population, and females 48.62%.

== Education ==
In 1991, Derai had an average literacy rate of 25.3% (7+ years), and the national average of 32.4% literate. In 2011, Derai had a literacy rate of 37.13%.

== Administration ==
Derai thana was formed in 1942 and it was turned into an upazila in 1982.

Derai Upazila is divided into Derai Municipality and nine union parishads: Bhatipara Union, Charnarchar, Derai Sarmangal, Jagdal, Karimpur, Kulanj, Rafinagar, Rajanagar, and Taral. The union parishads are subdivided into 137 mauzas and 232 villages.

Derai Municipality is subdivided into 9 wards and 29 mahallas.

=== Upazila chairmen ===
List of chairmen
Number	Name	Notes
01	Nasir Uddin Chowdhury	
02	Abdul Quddus	
03	Muhammad Hafizur Rahman Taluqdar	20/3/2014-9/5/2019
04	Muhammad Manzur Alam Chowdhury	Present

== Notable people ==
- Suranjit Sengupta, former Member of Parliament and minister, politician, lawyer
- Joya Sengupta, former Member of Parliament। politician
- Gulzar Ahmed Chowdhury, former Member of Parliament
- Kakon Bibi, Freedom fighter 1971
- Mifta Uddin Chowdhury Rumi, politician and justice
- Nasir Uddin Chowdhury, politician
- Nasum Ahmed, cricketer
- Shah Abdul Karim, folk minstrel
- Saleh Chowdhury, journalist

== See also ==
- Upazilas of Bangladesh
- Districts of Bangladesh
- Divisions of Bangladesh
- Bhatipara Zamidar Bari
