= Jatiya Ekata Party =

The Jatiya Ekata Party was a progressive left wing party in Bangladesh.

== History ==
The Jatiya Ekata Party was led by Suranjit Sengupta who was elected to the Bangladesh Parliament in 1979 on a nomination from the party. He was detained in 1981 under special powers act and released on 15 October 1982.
