= Rajanagar Union =

Rajanagar Union ৩ নং রাজানগর ইউনিয়ন পরিষদ
- Union Council
- 3 No. Rajanagar Union Council
- Flag Seal
- Interactive map of Rajanagar Union
- Coordinates: 24.7833°N 91.3500°E
- Country: Bangladesh
- Division: Sylhet Division
- Districts: Sunamganj District
- Upazila: Derai Upazila

Government
  - Type: Union council government
  - Body: Ministry of Local Government, Rural Development and Co-operatives
  - Chairman: Zohirul Islam Juyel (Ind.)

Area
  - Total: 4,280 ha (10,577 acres)

Population
  - Total: 24,476
- Time zone: UTC+06:00
- Administrative code: 60902976
- Website: rajanagarup.sunamganj.gov.bd

3 No. Rajanagar Union Council (Bengali: ৩ নং রাজানগর ইউনিয়ন পরিষদ) is a union council under Derai Upazila of Sunamganj District in the division of Sylhet, Bangladesh.

== Administration ==
Rajanagar is one of the largest union in Derai Upazila. This union has 9 wards and 31 villages.

== Population ==
Village Based Population of Rajanagar Union below Population

Name of Village	Population	Name of Village	Population
Dolua	777	East Anuwarpur	742
Modhupur	1235	Modhupur Rari	102
Kaima	704	Begumpur	440
Kejaura	1672	Kajaura	468
Gochia	1649	Jatichar	603
Jokinogor	887	Horinogor	152
Kodombotoli	1122	Kurargaun	42
Umednagar	923	BhorarGaon (Part)	325
Dhapkai	1483	Dhapkai (Part)	257
FatemaNagar	542	Kajuabad	710
Kalinagar	601	Rajanagar	1318
Hajanagar	707	Haronpur	363
Ronarchor	1607	Jagornarchor	785
New Ronarchor	771	Siriyarchor	407
Jahanpur	1762	Mirjapur	575
Anantapur	763		
