= Golam Jilani Chowdhury =

Bangladeshi politician

- গোলাম জিলানী চৌধুরী

Sunamganj-2 Jatiya Sangsad
- Preceded by: Suranjit Sengupta
- Succeeded by: Suranjit Sengupta
- In office 1988–1991

Personal details
- Born: Sunamganj, Bangladesh
- Party: Jatiya Party

Golam Jilani Chowdhury A politician in Sunamganj District of Sylhet Division of Bangladesh. He is a member of parliament from Sunamganj-2 seat in the 1988 fourth parliamentary election.

== Birth and early life ==
Golam Jilani Chowdhury was born in the Sunamganj District of the Sylhet Division in Bangladesh.

== Political life ==
Sunamganj District politician Ghulam Jilani Chowdhury filed a case in the Electoral Tribunal on charges of tampering with the fourth parliamentary elections. Tribunal declared Ghulam Jilani Chowdhury a winner. But Suranjit enjoyed the full term of Parliament at that time. Due to the issuance of Ershad's military rule, Jilani's fate was no longer in parliament.

== See also ==
- Sunamganj-1
- 1988 Bangladeshi general election
