= Joya Sengupta =

Bangladeshi politician

Jaya Sengupta
- জয়া সেনগুপ্ত

Member of the Bangladesh Parliament for Sunamganj-2
- In office 16 April 2017 – 6 August 2024
- Preceded by: Suranjit Sengupta
- Succeeded by: Md Nasir Chowdhury

Personal details
- Born: 21 September 1943 (age 82) Bengal Presidency, British India
- Party: Bangladesh Awami League
- Spouse: Suranjit Sengupta

Jaya Sengupta (Bengali: জয়া সেনগুপ্ত; born 21 September 1943) is a Bangladesh Awami League politician, doctor, and a former Jatiya Sangsad member representing the Sunamganj-2 constituency. Her husband, Suranjit Sengupta, was a senior leader of the Bangladesh Awami League and a minister of Bangladesh Railway.

== Career ==
Sengupta was married to veteran Bangladesh Awami League leader Suranjit Sengupta. She was a senior official in the non-governmental organisation Bangladesh Rural Advancement Committee (BRAC). Her husband was a member of the Bangladesh Awami League Advisory Council.

Sengupta was elected to the parliament from Sunamganj-2 constituency in Sunamganj District. She was elected in a by-election after the death of her husband, Suranjit Sengupta. She defeated her nearest rival Mahbub Hossain Reju in the by election, she had more than double the vote her opponent had. Her husband was the member of parliament from Sunamganj-2. The seat was vacated after he died on 5 February 2017. Joya Sengupta was sworn into office on 16 April 2017 by the speaker of the parliament, Shirin Sharmin Chaudhury, at the Jatiya Sangsad Bhaban. On 13 November 2017, she was nominated to the five-member panel of chairmen for the 18th session of Bangladesh Jatiya Sangsad (National Parliament). In absence of the speaker and deputy speaker, the panel is responsible for conducting the parliamentary session. Her constituency, Sunamganj, was flooded by flash floods and according to her affected nearly three hundred thousand people.
