= Jagdal Union, Derai =

Jagdal Union জগদল ইউনিয়ন
- Union Council
- 7 No. Jagdal Union Council
- Location within Bangladesh
- Coordinates: 24.7947°N 91.4319°E

Government
  - Body: Union Council
  - Chairman: Humayun Rashid Lavlu

Population
  - Total: 28,939
- Demonym(s): Jagdali, Sunamganji, Sylheti
- Website: www.jagddolup.sunamganj.gov.bd

Jagdal Union Parishad (Bengali: জগদল ইউনিয়ন পরিষদ) is a union parishad under Derai Upazila of Sunamganj District in the division of Sylhet, Bangladesh.

== Geography ==
Jagdal Union is located in the north-east corner of Derai Upazila. It is bordered with Dakshin Sunamganj Upazila in the north, Jagannathpur Upazila to the east, Kulanj Union on the south, and Karimpur Union to the west.

== Notable people ==
- Baul Shafiqun Noor, Baul musician

== See also ==
- Derai Municipality
- Derai Upazila
