= Mifta Uddin Chowdhury Rumi =

Bangladeshi judge

- মিফতা উদ্দিন চৌধুরী রুমী

Sunamganj-2 Jatiya Sangsad
- In office 1st
- Preceded by: Suranjit Sengupta
- Succeeded by: Nasir Uddin Chowdhury
- In office February 1996 – June 1996

Personal details
- Born: Sunamganj, Bangladesh
- Party: Bangladesh Nationalist Party

Mifta Uddin Chowdhury Rumi is a politician and former justice of the Sunamganj District a part of the Sylhet Division of Bangladesh. He was the BNP's MP from Sunamganj-2 (Derai-Shala) seat in the sixth parliamentary elections of the 1996 year.

== Birth and early life ==
Justice Mifta Uddin Chowdhury Rumi was born in Dirai upazila of the Sunamganj District.

== Career ==
Mifta Uddin Chowdhury Rumi is a former Justice of the Bangladesh High court.

=== Political life ===
He is a politician in the Sunamganj District and former vice-president of Sunamganj District BNP. He was the BNP's MP from Sunamganj-2 (Derai-Shala) seat in the sixth parliamentary elections of the 1996 year.

== See also ==
- Sunamganj-3
- February 1996 Bangladeshi general election
