= Otobi =

Bangladeshi furniture manufacturer

- Type: Private
- Industry: Furniture
- Founded: 1975
- Headquarters: Dhaka
- Key people: Nitun Kundu
- Products: Furniture
- Number of employees: 1500
- Website: www.otobi.com

Otobi is a Bangladesh-based furniture manufacturer and retailer. The company was established in 1975 by Nitun Kundu. Its Managing Director is Animesh Kundu who is the son of Nitun Kundu. Otobi manufactures both Home and Office furniture. Otobi sells its product locally in Bangladesh and exports to India too in a small volume.

In mid 2006, Engr. Sabbir Hasan Nasir joined the company as CEO. Bidyut Kumar Basu was made the CEO of the company in 2015. Mr. Sudipta Goswami took over as Chief Executive Officer in 2018 and currently, Mr Arfin Ali, FCA holds the CEO position.

At present, the Senior Operational Managements of OTOBI Ltd are as follows:

Managing Director: Animesh Kundu

Head of Business: Ahammed Shukairy

Head of Plants: Engr. Md Rubel Rana, ME, BUET

Head of I&D: Engr. Mizanur Rahman

Otobi is also the parent company of Quantum Power Systems Ltd.

== See also ==
- List of companies of Bangladesh
