= Syed Abdullah Khalid =

Bangladeshi sculptor and painter

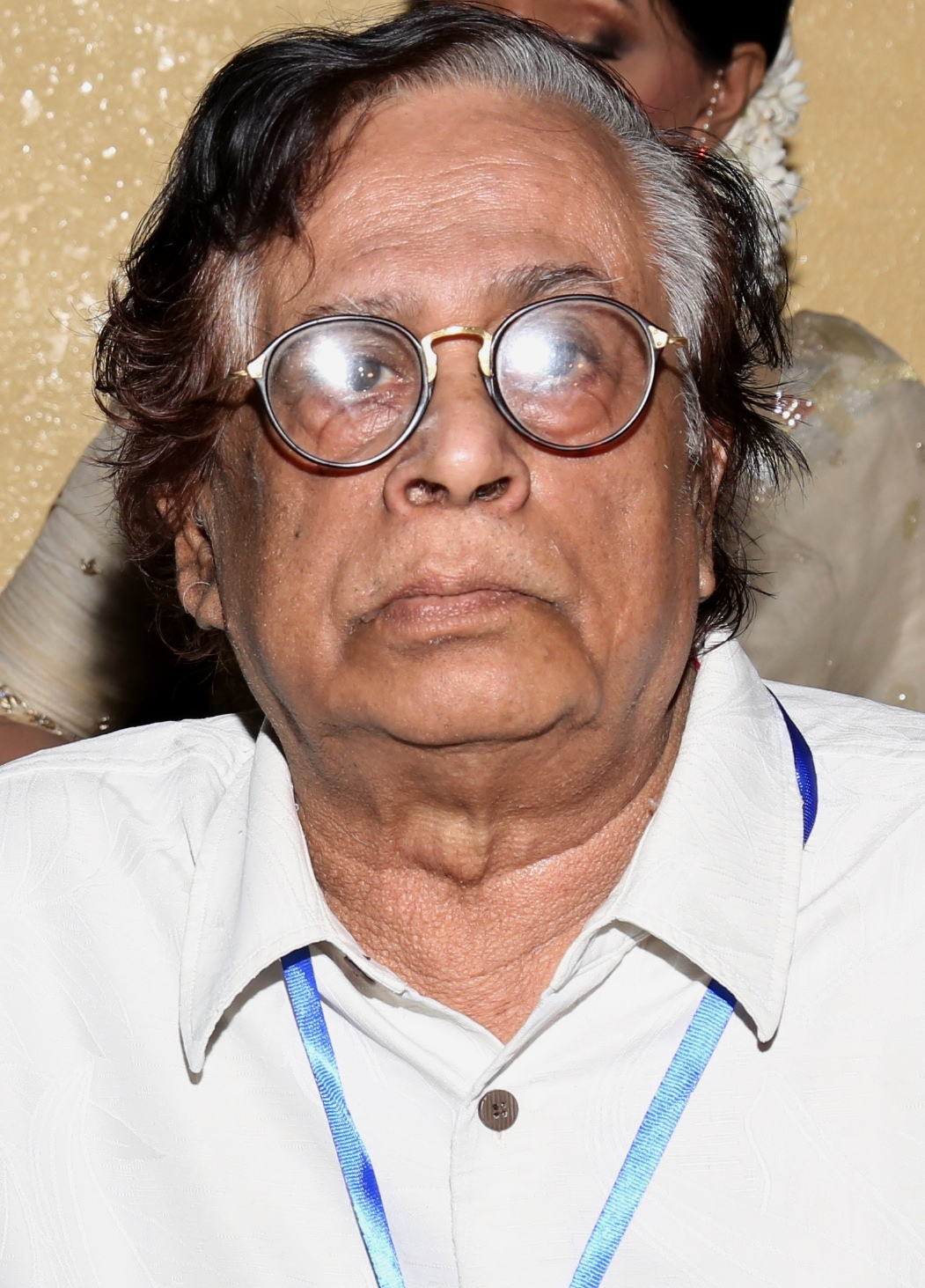
- Khalid in 2017
- Born: c. 1942; Sylhet, Bengal Presidency, British India
- Died: 20 May 2017 (aged 75); Dhaka, Bangladesh
- Occupations: Sculptor, artist, academician
- Notable work: Aparajeyo Bangla
- Awards: Ekushey Padak, Shilpakala Padak

Syed Abdullah Khalid (c. 1942 — 20 May 2017) was a Bangladeshi sculptor and painter. He was awarded Ekushey Padak by the Government of Bangladesh in February 2017.

== Early life and education ==
Khalid was born in Sylhet in the then British India. He completed his BFA in painting in 1969 from East Pakistan College of Arts and Crafts (presently Faculty of Fine Arts, University of Dhaka) and did his MFA in painting and sculpture from the University of Chittagong in 1974.

== Career and work ==
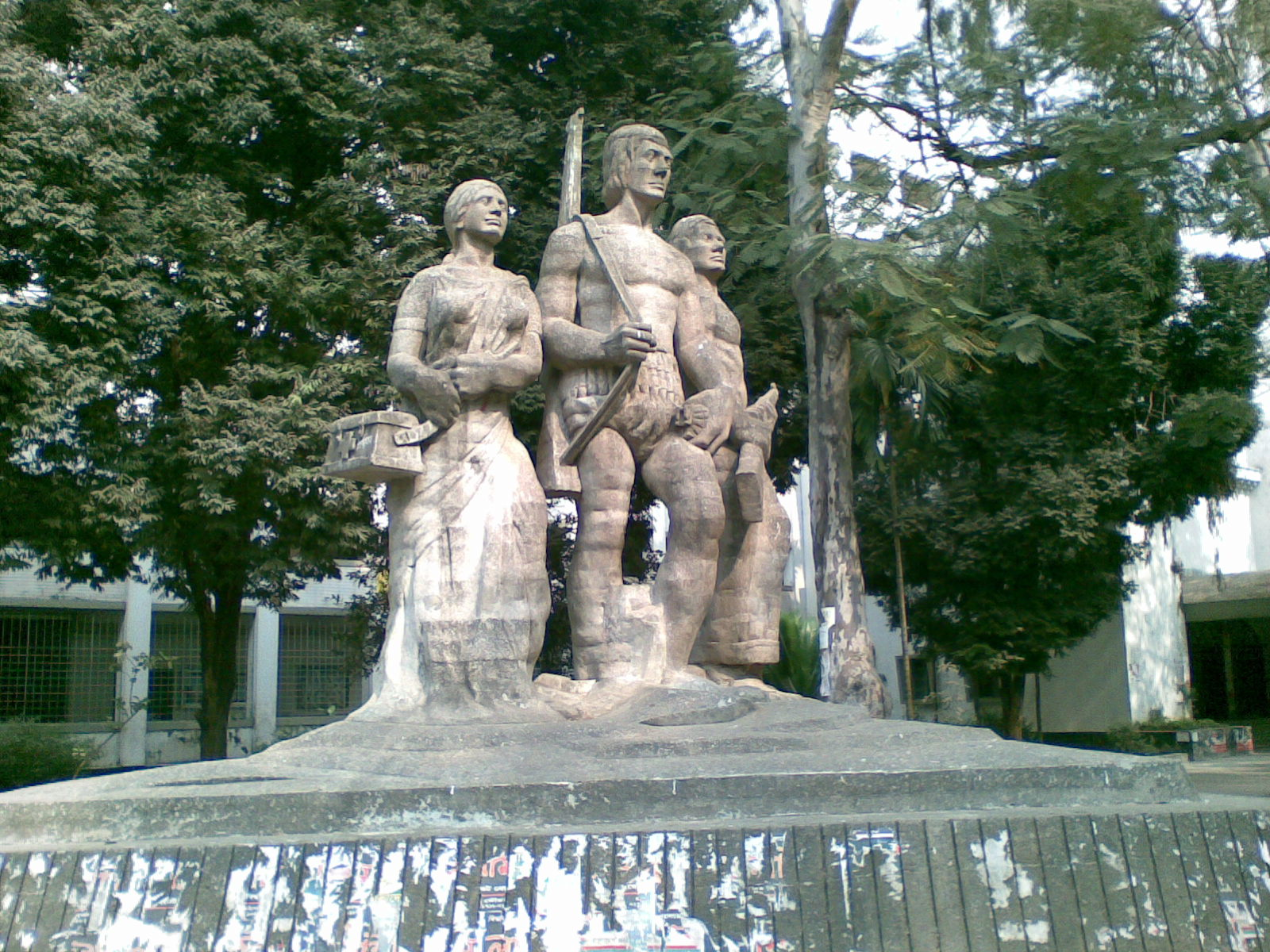
Aparajeyo Bangla (1973-79)

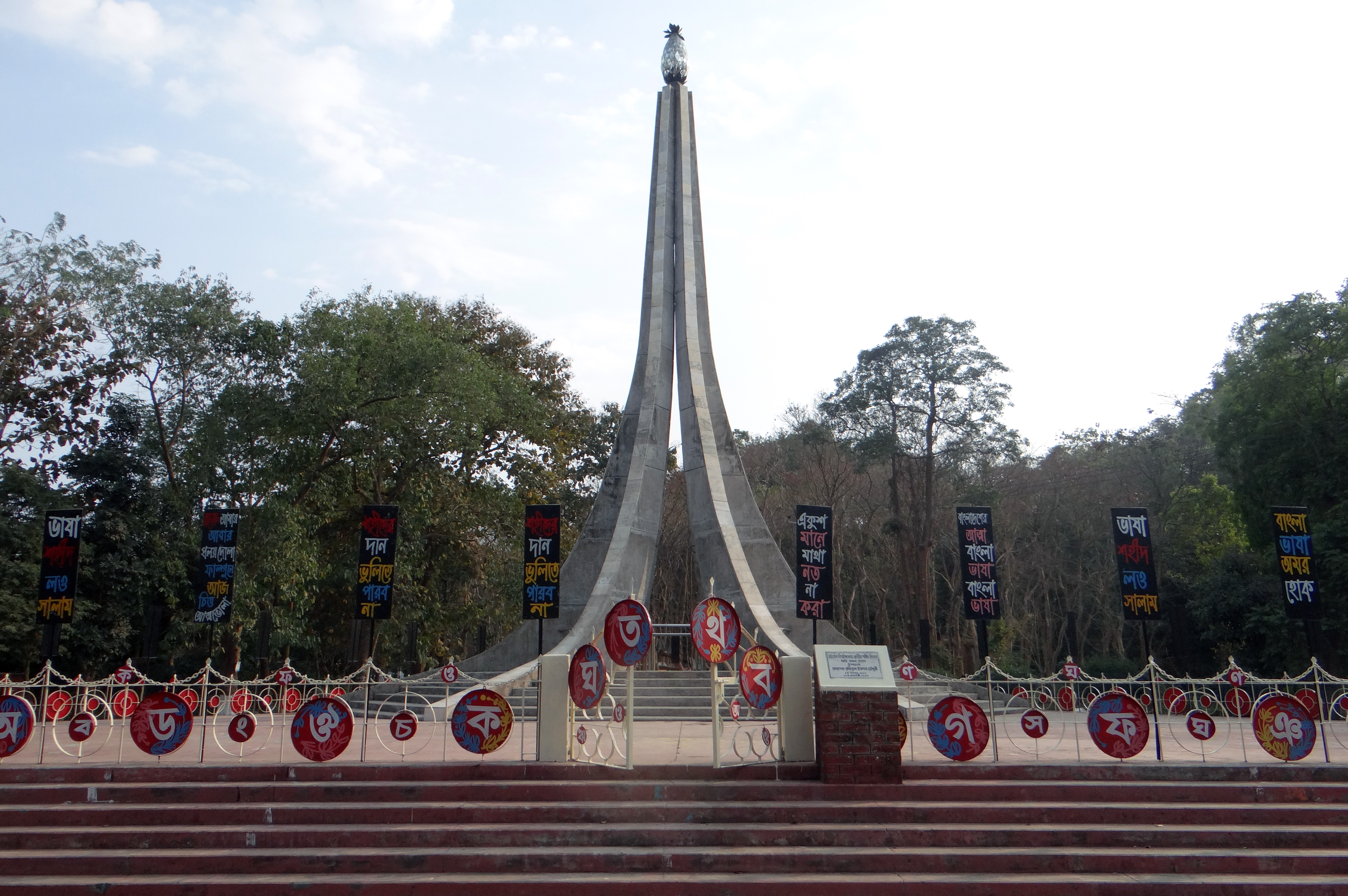
Central Shaheed minar, Chittagong University

Khalid's works included distinctive commissions like Aparajeyo Bangla, a monument on liberation war of Bangladesh in the University of Dhaka campus (1973–79), the terracotta relief on socio-cultural heritage at the Bangladesh Bank headquarters (1995–96) and a 447 square foot mural Abahaman Bangla at the Bangladesh Television Center (1974). He also designed the central shaheed minar of Chittagong university.

Khalid had exhibited solo three times since and he was awarded first prize in the Second National Sculpture Exhibition organized by the Bangladesh Shilpakala Academy in 1983. At various times he was nominated judge by Bangladesh Shilpakala Academy for national level exhibitions. In 1987 he was appointed team leader for participation in SAARC Workshop on Traditional Terracotta held in Madras, India. His works can be seen in the permanent collection of the National Museum of Bangladesh, the Bangladesh Shilpakala Academy, the Prime Minister's Residence and other important private and institutional collections.

Khalid was a professor of sculpture at Institute of Fine Arts, the University of Chittagong till 2012.

== Honors ==
The Government of Bangladesh issued a commemorative stamp (1990–91) and a silver coin (1998) showing Khalid's most notable work, Aparajeyo Bangla. He was awarded Shilpakala Padak in 2014 and Ekushey Padak in 2017.

== Death ==
Khalid was taken to Dhaka's Central Hospital on 2 May 2017 from complications of chronic obstructive pulmonary disease and then transferred to BIRDEM's intensive care unit on 10 May. He died on 20 May at the age of 75.
