= Aparajeyo Bangla =

Sculpture in Bangladesh

Aparajeyo Bangla Unvanquished Bengal
- অপরাজেয় বাংলা (Bengali)
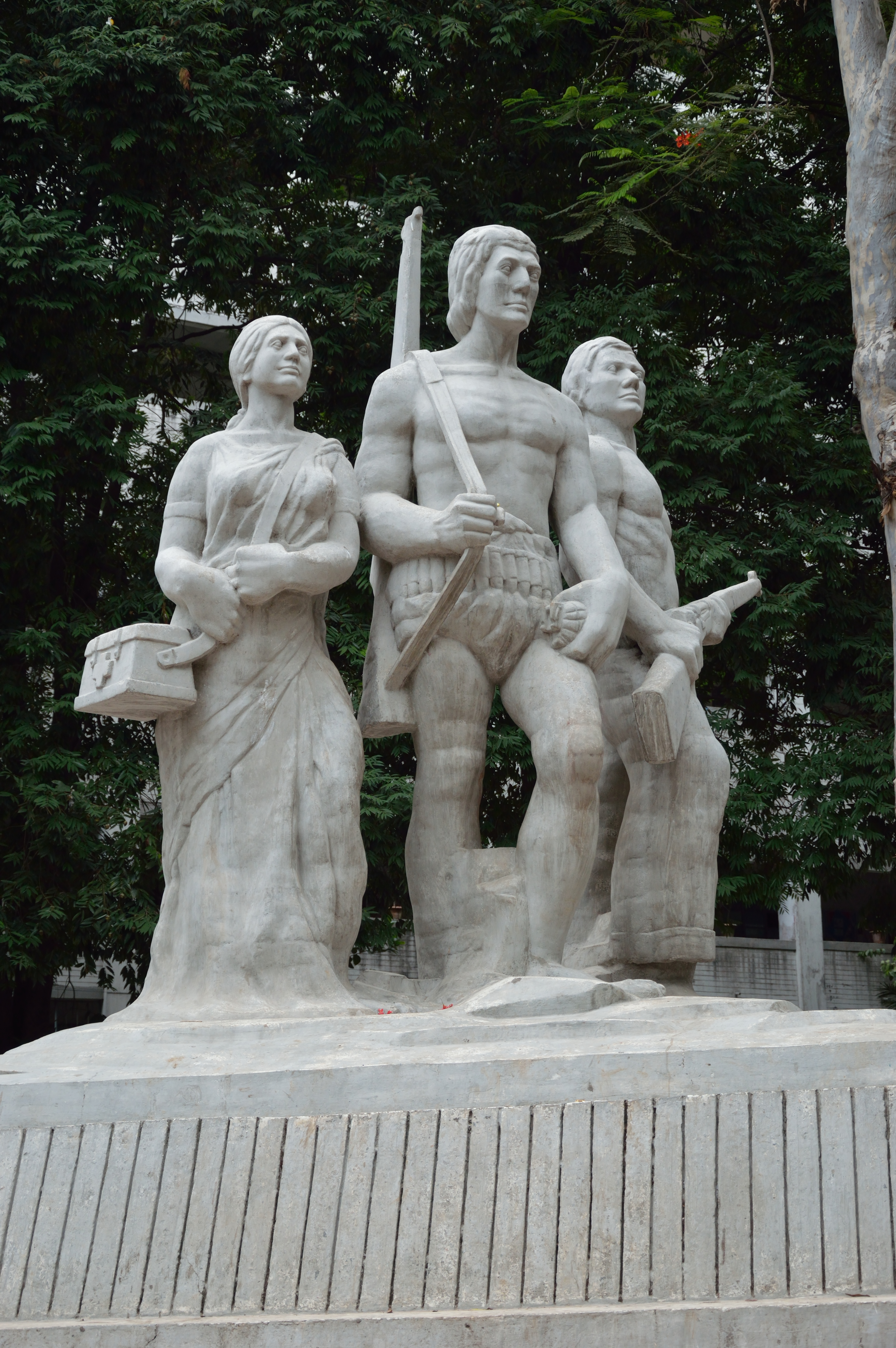
- Artist: Syed Abdullah Khalid
- Year: 1973-1979
- Medium: Sculpture in reinforced concrete
- Subject: Fighters of the Bangladesh Liberation War
- Dimensions: 5.5 m (18 ft)
- Location: Dhaka University, Dhaka, Bangladesh; 23.733621°N 90.392766°E

Aparajeyo Bangla (Bengali: অপরাজেয় বাংলা) is a sculpture dedicated to the Bangladesh Liberation War in 1971. It is located in the campus of the University of Dhaka, just in front of the Faculty of Arts Building. In Bengali, the phrase means "Unvanquished Bengal".

== History ==
The sculpture work was started at the end of 1973 based on sculptor Syed Abdullah Khalid's design and superintendence of the DUCSU Authority. The Dainik Bangla news reporter Saleh Chowdhury came to visit the sculpture and wrote an article about it. The article illuminated the people of Bangladesh, so the sculptor is known all over the world. In that Article Saleh Choudhury named it as Aparajeyo Bangla and that has been established as permanent name later on by the university authority and the artist (source Prothom Alo news on Saleh Choudhury'/ sad demise on 5 September 2017 and journalist Hasan Shaharear's article on Saleh Choudhury published in Shamokal Bangla newspaper). Before Aparajeyo Bangla there was another 3 feet long sculpture, then Dackshu Authority broke down the sculpture and started to work on Aparajeyo Bangla project. Hasina Ahmed, Syed Hamid Maksood and Badrul Alam Benu, who are very close to Khalid, modelled for 'Aparajeyo Bangla'. The artist closely observed the models' personalities and his close association with them enabled him to do justice with his portrayal. In August 1975 Sheikh Mujibur Rahman was murdered so the Dackshu Authority stopped the Aparajeyo Bangla project. Political instability and the arrest of the then vice-chancellor of Dhaka University, Abdul Matin Chowdhury, also disrupted the work. The project remained incomplete till the end of 1978. In January 1979, some fundamentalist groups tried to demolish the Dackshu sculpture Authority. However, the project members and the students of Dhaka University fiercely guarded the work. After a long hiatus, the work began once more in December the beginning of 1979—with a new vision. At last the project work was finished on 16 December 1979. The sculpture was unveiled on December 16th at 9 am. The sculpture was inaugurated by wounded freedom fighters.

== Historical significance ==
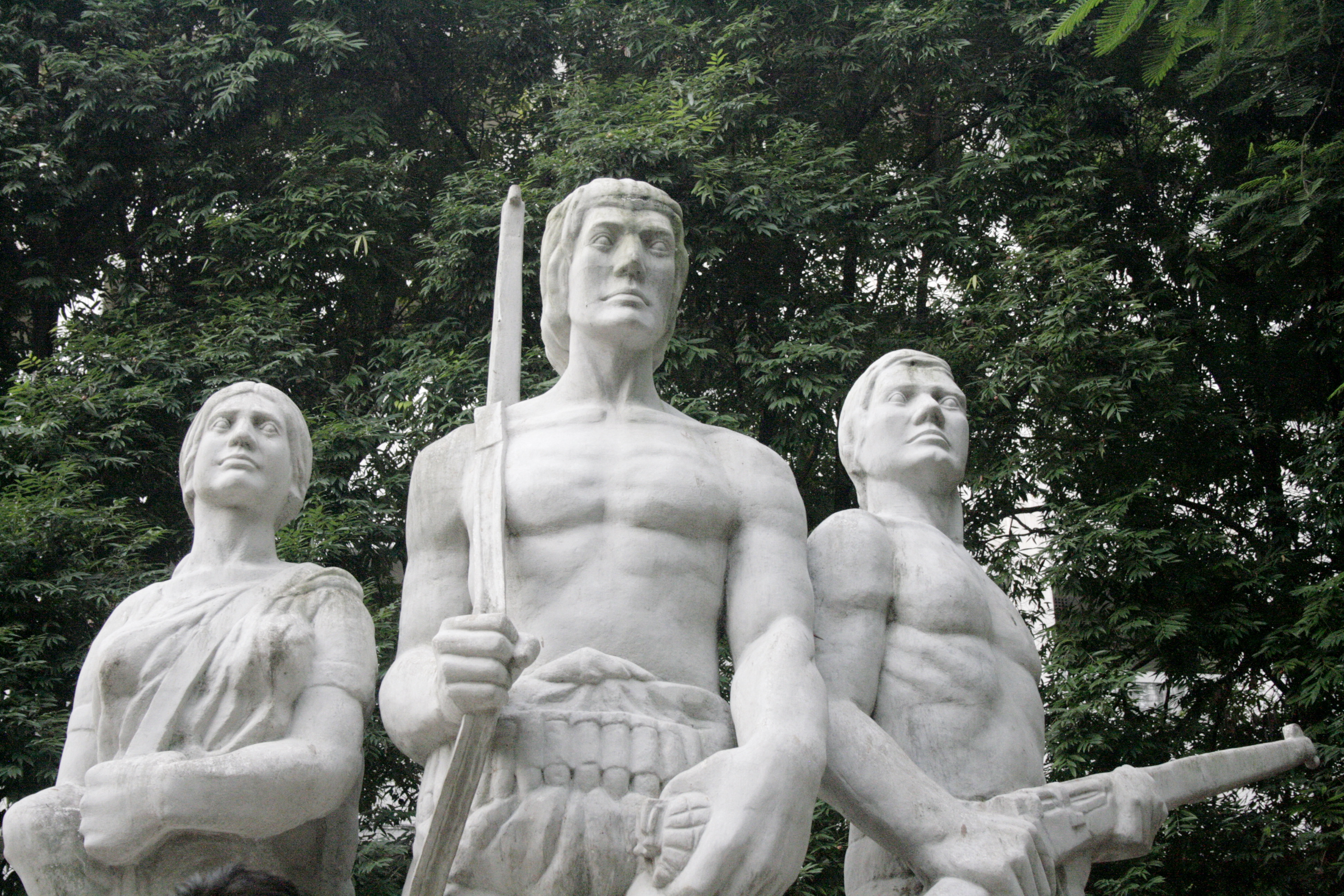
Aparajeyo Bangla.

After the war, the DUCSU committee proposed the sculpture to commemorate the glory of liberation. In Syed Abdullah Khalid's sculpture there are 3 statues. The composition of Aparajeyo Bangla is quite mature, the figures are dynamic. In the centre is a statue of a farmer on whose shoulder is a rifle and in whose hand is a grenade, the statue represents the general people of Bangladesh. On the left side there is a lady in whose hand is a first-aid box to indicate that she is a nurse, and in the right side there is a student wearing only a pair of pants and holding a rifle in his hand, to represent youth. All things considered Aparajeyo Bangla is a pioneer in the field of sculptures from the liberation war. For the design of sculpture the lady model was Hasina Ahamed who was a housewife and the farmer model was Badrul Alam Banu who was a student of the art department and the student model was Sayed Hamid Maksud, who was another student of University of Dhaka,

== Sculpture ==
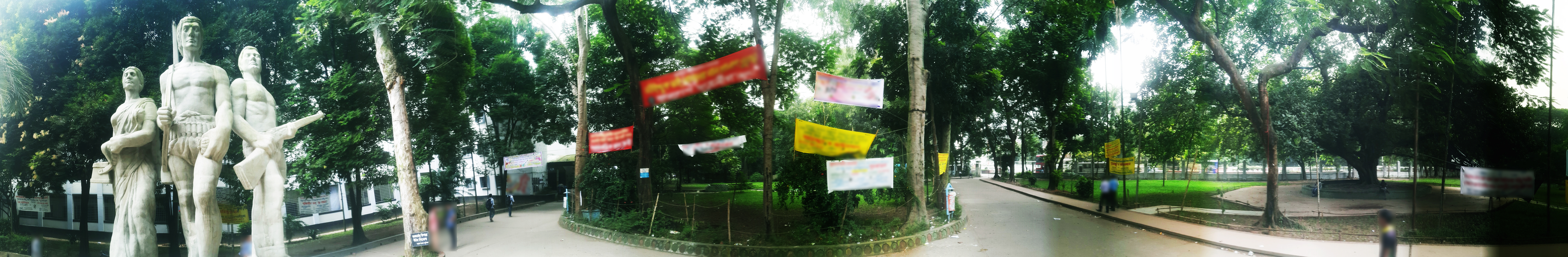
The sculpture & The Faculty of Arts premises.

The sculpture is built of reinforced concrete with a 4-inch coating, to a height of up to 18 feet. The sculpture was refabricated after inscribing on the base. The sculpture coating was worked under Sahiddullah Associates and the sculpture base was designed by architect Rabioul Hossain. It is a sculpture of the three figures, the central character, a village youth stands in the middle clutching the strap of a rifle in his hand and a grenade in the left . To the left of him is an urban youth with a rifle . At the right is a young lady devoted to nursing with a first aid box at her shoulder. These three represent the concerted strength of the whole Bengali nation.

== Documentary about the sculpture ==
In 2011 a documentary film about the sculpture was released to mark the 40th anniversary of Bangladesh independence, directed by Saiful Wadud Helal, and produced by Shafiul Wadud. The film presents the background of the 1971 war, and sheds light on attempts by religious fanatics to destroy the structure.
