= SAARC Fountain =

Fountain in Dhaka, Bangladesh

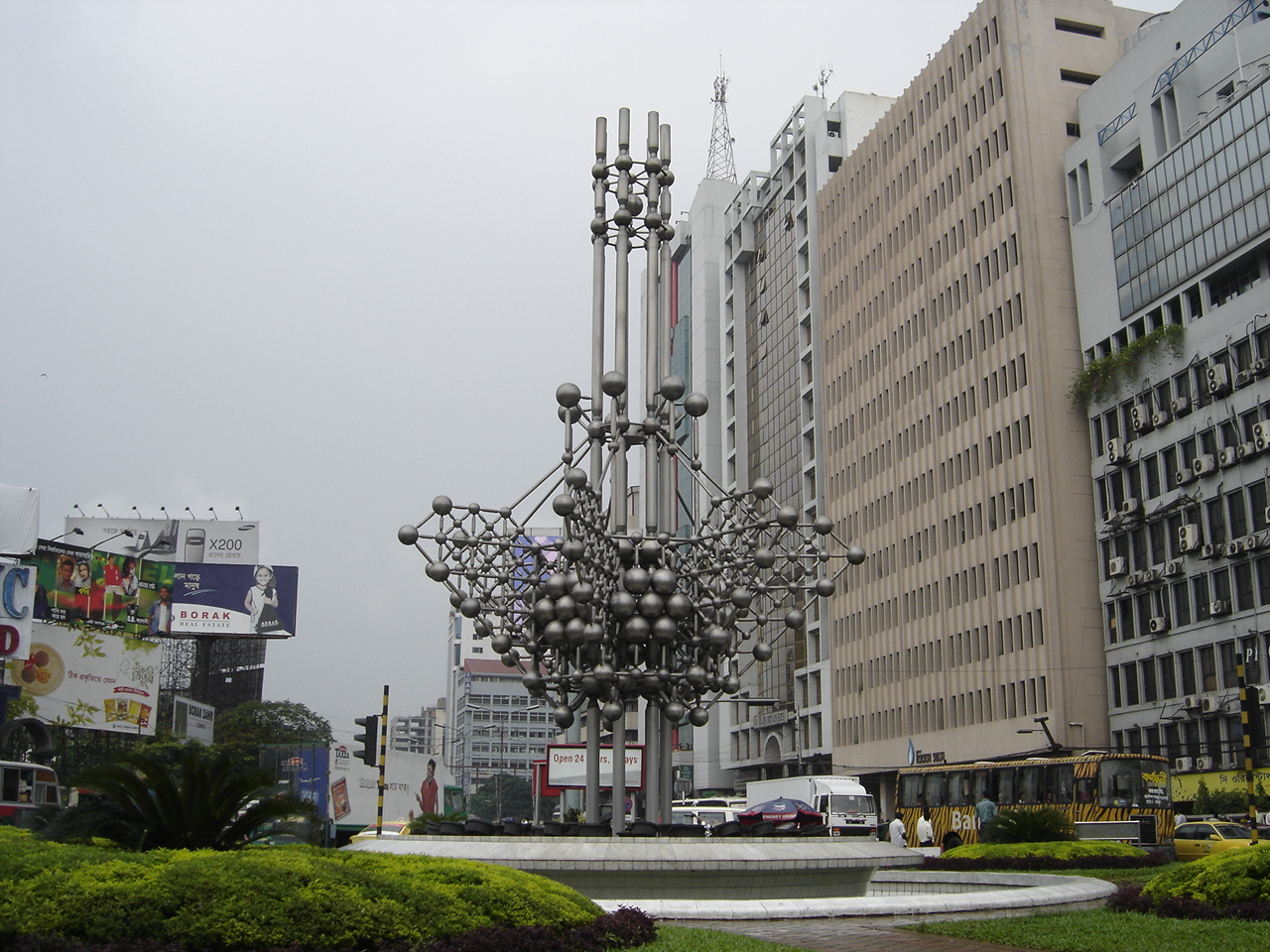
- The SAARC Fountain in Kawran Bazar, Dhaka, Bangladesh

- Location of the fountain in Dhaka
- Artist: Nitun Kundu
- Year: 1985
- Completion date: 1985
- Medium: Steel
- Dimensions: 9.75 m (32 ft); 32 m diameter (105 ft)
- Location: Dhaka; 23.749909°N 90.393162°E

SAARC Fountain is a fountain in Dhaka, Bangladesh. It is situated at Kawran Bazar, at the intersection of Panthapath, Kazi Nazrul Islam Avenue, and Sonargaon Road, and is adjacent to the Pan Pacific Sonargaon hotel.

The structure was designed by Nitun Kundu, a Bangladeshi artist and sculptor. While the fountain is made of steel, the reservoir is made of reinforced cement concrete.

The structure was built shortly before the inaugural SAARC summit held in Dhaka in 1985.
