= Suranjit Sengupta =

Bangladeshi politician

Babu Suranjit Sengupta
- সুরঞ্জিৎ সেনগুপ্ত
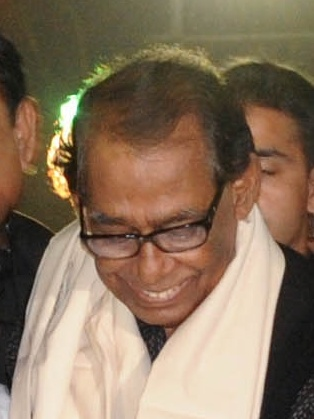
- Suranjit Sengupta in 2015

Minister of Railways
- In office 6 December 2011 – 18 April 2012
- Prime Minister: Sheikh Hasina
- Preceded by: Position Established
- Succeeded by: Mujibul Haque Mujib

Member of Parliament
- In office 1 October 2001 – 5 February 2017
- Preceded by: Nasir Uddin Chowdhury
- Succeeded by: Joya Sengupta
- Constituency: Sunamganj-2
- In office 1 October 1997 – 1 October 2001
- Preceded by: Sharif Uddin Ahmed
- Succeeded by: Najmul Hasan Zahed
- Constituency: Habiganj-2
- In office 27 February 1991 – 15 February 1996
- Preceded by: Golam Jilani Chowdhury
- Succeeded by: Mifta Uddin Chowdhury Rumi
- Constituency: Sunamganj-2
- In office 7 May 1986 – 3 March 1988
- Preceded by: Constituency Created
- Succeeded by: Golam Jilani Chowdhury
- Constituency: Sunamganj-2
- In office 18 February 1979 – 12 February 1982
- Preceded by: Abdus Samad Azad
- Succeeded by: Boundaries changed
- Constituency: Sylhet-2

Personal details
- Born: 7 July 1945 Sirajdikhan, Bikrampur, Bengal Presidency, British India (present day Munshiganj, Bangladesh)
- Died: 5 February 2017 (aged 71) Dhaka, Bangladesh
- Party: Bangladesh Awami League
- Other political affiliations: Jatiya Ekata Party
- Spouse: Joya Sengupta
- Children: Soumen Sengupta
- Education: MA, LLB
- Occupation: politician, lawyer

Suranjit Sengupta (5 May 1945 – 5 February 2017) was a Bangladesh Awami League politician. He resigned in 2012 as the first Railway Minister of Bangladesh. He was the member of parliament from Sunamganj-2 constituency in the Jatiya Sangsad and a member of the party's advisory council. He was the chairman of the parliamentary standing committee on the Law, Justice, and Parliamentary Affairs Ministry.

== Early life and education ==
Sengupta was born to a Bengali Hindu family in Sirajdikhan Upazila of formerly Bikrampur present day Munshiganj District, to Devendra Nath Sengupta and Sumati Bala Sengupta on 5 May in 1945. Among four brothers and a sister, he was the youngest. Between 1954-55 his father shifted his family from Bikrampur to his working place Derai in Sunamganj district. Mr Sengupta lived his life there until his death . He completed his bachelor's and master's degrees at the University of Dhaka. He earned his LLB at the Central Law College and practised law for a while.

== Career ==
Sengupta started his career as a lawyer. He became a member of Supreme Court Bar Council. He started his political career with leftist parties. In 1970's National Election of Pakistan, he was elected from the Sylhet District as a candidate of the National Awami Party in the Provincial Assembly. He participated in the Bangladesh Liberation War in 1971 as a sub-commander of the Sector-5. In the Constituent Assembly of Bangladesh, he was a vocal member of the opposition bench. In the 1973 Bangladeshi general election he stood as a nominee of the National Awami Party faction led by Muzaffar Ahmed (NAP (M)). In 1979, he represented the Ekota Party in the House and in 1991, the Ganatantri Party. He joined Bangladesh Awami League party in 1996, but lost the national election that year. But he made it to parliament through a by-election. He represented Sunamganj-2 constituency in the next three parliaments.

On 24 February 1996, prior to the controversial elections that month, police raided his house along with those of Amir Hossain Amu and Mohammad Abdur Razzaque under the Special Powers Act, but were unable to locate him.

In November 2011, Sengupta was made a cabinet member of the newly formed Railways Ministry. But after a bribery scandal became known, leaders from both the Bangladesh Workers Party and the Awami League called for him to resign. He served as a minister without a portfolio. He was not selected for a cabinet position after the 2014 election.

=== Railway bribery scandal ===
Sengupta took over as Railways Minister and resigned after 5 months on an allegation of bribery. He was accused of direct involvement in corruption of 100 million Taka. On 9 April 2012 his assistant personal secretary, general manager of the eastern region, and commandant of security were driving to Sengupta's residence with 7.4 million Taka of bribe money, when the driver Azam Khan turned them in. On 17 April 2012, Sengupta was appointed minister without portfolio one day after submitting his resignation as Railways Minister and after being accused of bribery.

=== Amar Desh allegations of corruption ===
On 31 March 2013, the newspaper Amar Desh published a report stating that Sengupta demanded a thirty million taka bribe from an orphanage project, and cancelled the project's funding when his demand was refused. Sengupta commented on the report, saying, "The matter of asking for a three crore bribe is a complete lie. There are 36–37 education institutions in my area. But the huge funding of this project created a negative impression with the local institutions. So I suggested distributing the fund equally to the existing institutions in order to eliminate the negativity created."

In April 2013, Sengupta brought a defamation case against the Amar Desh staff, including Mahmudur Rahman and an NGO official for the publishing of this report.

== Personal life and death ==
Sengupta was married to Joya Sengupta. Together they had one son, Showmon Sengupta.

Sengupta died on 5 February 2017 at LabAid hospital in Dhaka.
