= Sunamganj-2 =

Constituency of Bangladesh's Jatiya Sangsad

Coordinates: 24.79°N 91.35°E

- Constituency for the Jatiya Sangsad
- District: Sunamganj District
- Division: Sylhet Division
- Electorate: 250,721 (2018)

Current constituency
- Created: 1984
- Party: Bangladesh Nationalist Party
- Member: Nasir Uddin Chowdhury
- ← 224 Sunamganj-1 226 Sunamganj-3 →

Sunamganj-2 is a constituency represented in the Jatiya Sangsad (National Parliament) of Bangladesh since 2026 by Nasir Uddin Chowdhury of the Bangladesh Nationalist Party.

== Boundaries ==
The constituency encompasses Derai and Shalla upazilas.

== History ==
The constituency was created in 1984 from the Sylhet-2 constituency when the former Sylhet District was split into four districts: Sunamganj, Sylhet, Moulvibazar, and Habiganj.

== Members of Parliament ==
Election	Member	Party
1986	Suranjit Sengupta	Ganatantri Party
1988	Golam Jilani Chowdhury	
1991	Suranjit Sengupta	Ganatantri Party
Feb 1996	Mifta Uddin Chowdhury Rumi	Bangladesh Nationalist Party
Jun 1996	Nasir Uddin Chowdhury	Jatiya Party (Ershad)
2001	Suranjit Sengupta	Awami League
2017 by-election	Joya Sengupta	Awami League
2018	Joya Sengupta	Awami League
2024	Joya Sengupta	Independent
2026	Nasir Uddin Chowdhury	Bangladesh Nationalist Party

== Elections ==
=== Elections in the 2020s ===
General election 2026: Sunamganj-2
Party	Candidate	Votes	%	±%
CPB	Niranjan Das	1232	0.75	N/A
BNP	Md Nasir Chowdhury	99522	60.69	N/A
Jamaat	Md Shishir Monir	63220	38.55	N/A
Majority		36,302	22.13	N/A
Turnout		163974	54.73	N/A

Suranjit Sengupta died in February 2017. Joya Sengupta, his widow, was elected in a March 2017 by-election.

Sunamganj-2 by-election, 2017
Party	Candidate	Votes	%	±%
AL	Joya Sengupta	95,959	69.5	N/A
Independent	Sayed Ali Mahbub Hossain	42,156	30.5	N/A
Majority		53,803	39.0	+28.8
Turnout		138,115	54.7	−33.4
AL hold				

Suranjit Sengupta was elected unopposed in the 2014 general election after opposition parties withdrew their candidacies in a boycott of the election.

=== Elections in the 2000s ===
General Election 2008: Sunamganj-2
Party	Candidate	Votes	%	±%
AL	Suranjit Sengupta	95,593	55.1	N/A
BNP	Md. Nasir Chowdhury	77,889	44.9	+0.7
Majority		17,704	10.2	−0.6
Turnout		173,482	88.1	+8.3
AL hold				

General Election 2001: Sunamganj-2
Party	Candidate	Votes	%	±%
AL	Suranjit Sengupta	82,839	55.0	+6.7
BNP	Nasir Uddin Chowdhury	66,558	44.2	+42.7
IJOF	Sheikh Jahir Ali	1,185	0.8	N/A
Majority		16,281	10.8	+10.4
Turnout		150,582	79.8	−3.6
AL gain from JP(E)				

=== Elections in the 1990s ===
General Election June 1996: Sunamganj-2
Party	Candidate	Votes	%	±%
JP(E)	Nasir Uddin Chowdhury	59,000	48.7	+12.7
AL	Suranjit Sengupta	58,496	48.3	N/A
BNP	Jahir Ahmed	1,868	1.5	0.0
Jamaat	Md. Abdul Mannan	1,104	0.9	N/A
CPB	Probangsu Chowdhury	560	0.5	N/A
Independent	Md. Muhitur Rahman Chowdhury	164	0.1	N/A
Majority		504	0.4	−13.8
Turnout		121,192	83.4	+20.0
JP(E) gain from BNP				

General Election 1991: Sunamganj-2
Party	Candidate	Votes	%	±%
Ganatantri Party	Suranjit Sengupta	58,580	58.4	
JP(E)	Dobirul Islam Chowdhury	36,067	36.0	
Independent	Zahir Ahmed	3,556	3.6	
BNP	Rana Hasan Chowdhury	1,532	1.5	
Independent	Motiur Rahman	328	0.3	
Jatiyatabadi Gonotantrik Chashi Dal	Md. Fazlul Haq	231	0.2	
Majority		22,513	14.2	
Turnout		100,294	63.4	
Ganatantri Party gain from				
