= Bhatipara Union =

Bhatipara Union ২ নং ভাটিপাড়া ইউনিয়ন পরিষদ
- Union Council
- 2 No. Bhatipara Union Council
- Interactive map of Bhatipara Union
- Country: Bangladesh
- Division: Sylhet Division
- Districts: Sunamganj District
- Upazila: Derai Upazila

Government
  - Type: Union council government
  - Body: Ministry of Local Government, Rural Development and Co-operatives
  - Chairman: Md Badrul Islam Chowdhury

Area
  - Total: 37.90 km^{2} (14.63 sq mi)

Population
  - Total: 19,865
  - Density: 524.2/km^{2} (1,358/sq mi)
- Time zone: UTC+06:00
- Website: bhatiparaup.sunamganj.gov.bd

Bhatipara Union is a union parishad under Derai Upazila of Sunamganj District in the division of Sylhet, Bangladesh.

== History ==
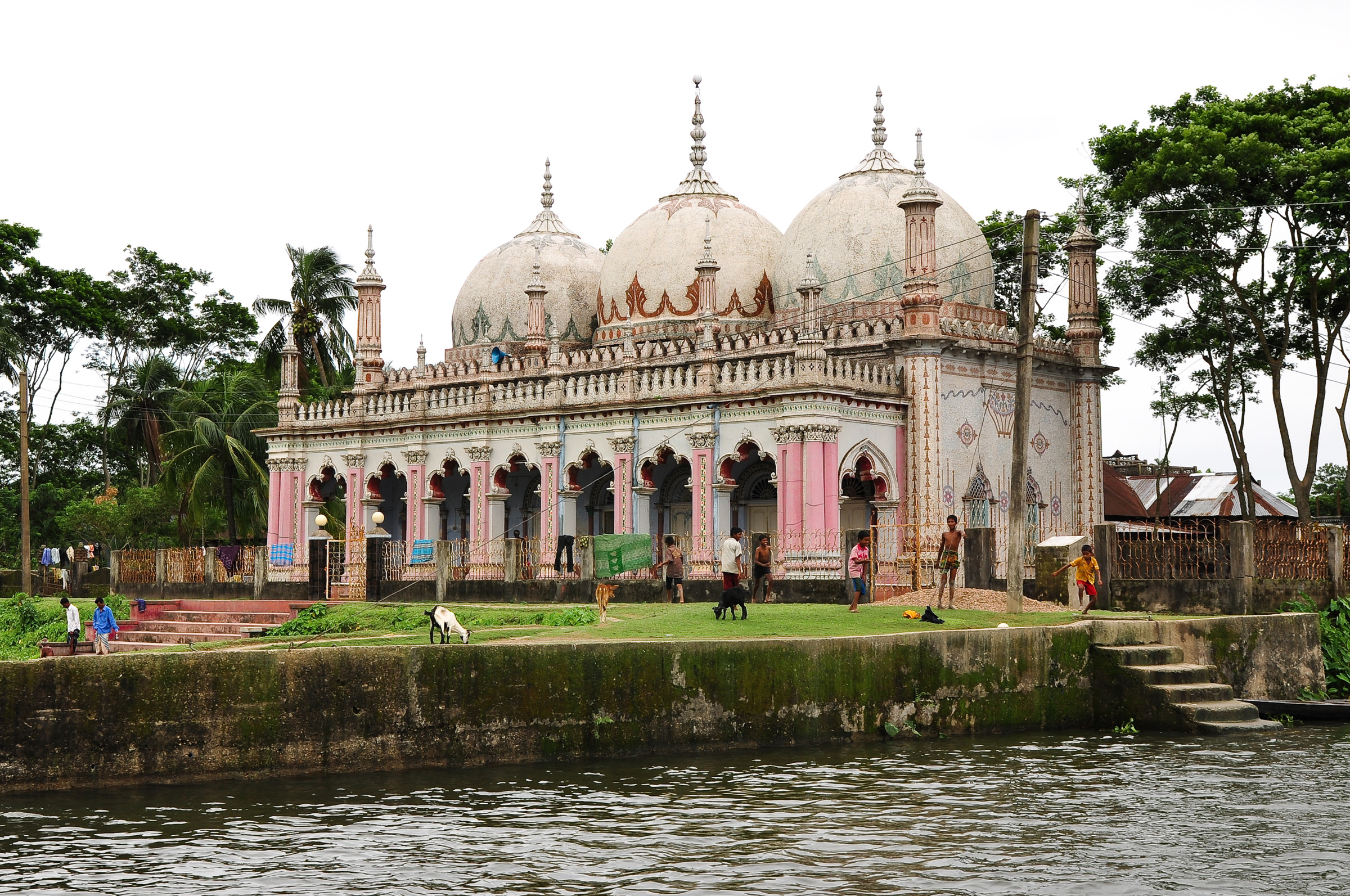
The Zamindar Bari Mosque of Bhatipara dates back to the 17th century.

The Mandari Union was formed around 1943 during British rule, comprising the current 12 villages. At that time, the chairman of the union was referred to as the village president. In 1950, during Pakistan's rule, the title of village president was officially changed to Union Chairman. Subsequently, Golam Hossain Sarkar and Sadat Ali served as village presidents. In 1967, Dr. Reaz Uddin Sarkar, a member of the then Pakistan Sub-Divisional Jury Board, was the first to be appointed as Union Council Chairman, and he served as the chairman during the Liberation War. After the independence of Bangladesh in 1971, the subsequent chairmen included Taiyab Ali, A. Matin (acting), and Mazedul Islam Sarkar (elected for a second term), followed by Taiyab Ali again. In 1985, for administrative convenience, the then administrator separated Rasulpur village from Mandari Union to form a new union called Rasulpur. Currently, Mandari Union Council consists of the same 12 villages.

There are two local legends regarding the name of Mandari Union. Previously, Hindus were predominant in most of the villages in Mandari Union. Radha Ram Singh and Ashu Singh, among the wealthy individuals of Mandari village, were the first to propose the name of Mandari Union. At that time, boats were the only means of communication for Mandari Union.

== Administrative ==
Bhatipara is a small union, it has only 17 villages and 9 wards (as all union council).

== Education and culture ==
=== Culture ===
The traditional characteristics of a low-lying region surrounded by haor wetlands are prevalent here. The majority of the people in this area have been engaged in agriculture for a long time, making their daily lives and culture intricately linked with farming.

The locals generally speak Sylheti, with some influence from the Mymensingh dialect.
