= Shabash Bangladesh =

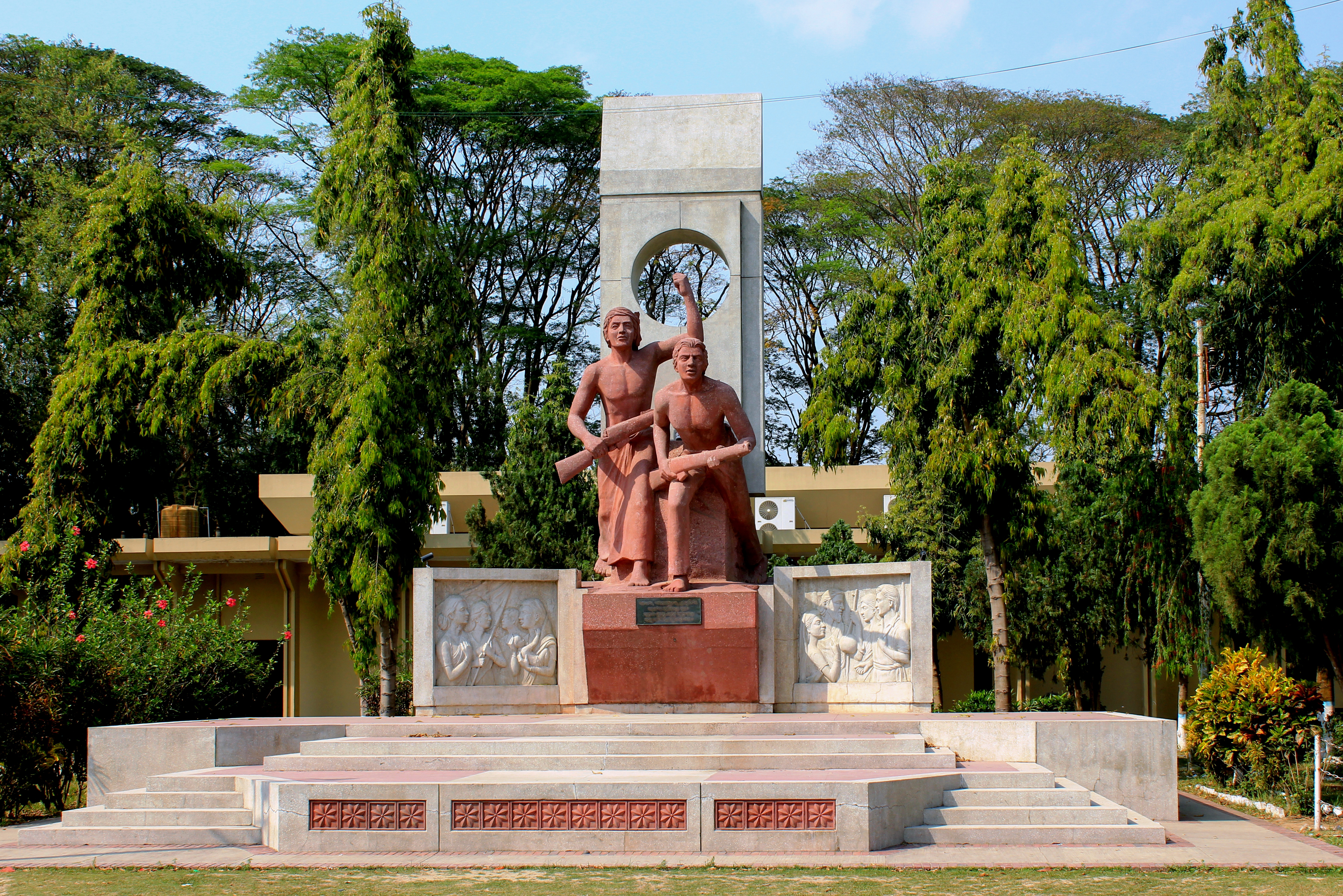
- সাবাশ বাংলাদেশ
- Artist: Nitun Kundu
- Year: 1991
- Subject: Liberation War of Bangladesh
- Location: University of Rajshahi, Rajshahi, Bangladesh; 24.22°N 88.36°E
- Owner: University of Rajshahi

Shabash Bangladesh (Bravo Bangladesh) (Bengali: সাবাশ বাংলাদেশ) is a sculpture in Bangladesh. It is located at Rajshahi University premises. Shabash Bangladesh is another state of the art sculpture created to pay tribute to those killed in the Liberation War of Bangladesh.

Nitun Kundu is the sculptor of Shabash Bangladesh. The name of the sculpture comes from a poem named "Durmor" by Sukanta Bhattacharya. The last four lines of which is engraved under the structure:

সাবাস বাংলাদেশ
এ পৃথিবী অবাক তাকিয়ে রয়
জ্বলে পুড়ে মরে ছারখার
তবু মাথা নোয়াবার নয়।

Translation :

"Bravo Bangladesh!
The world is amazed!
fired, burned, died and destroyed
but never gave up!"

== Gallery ==
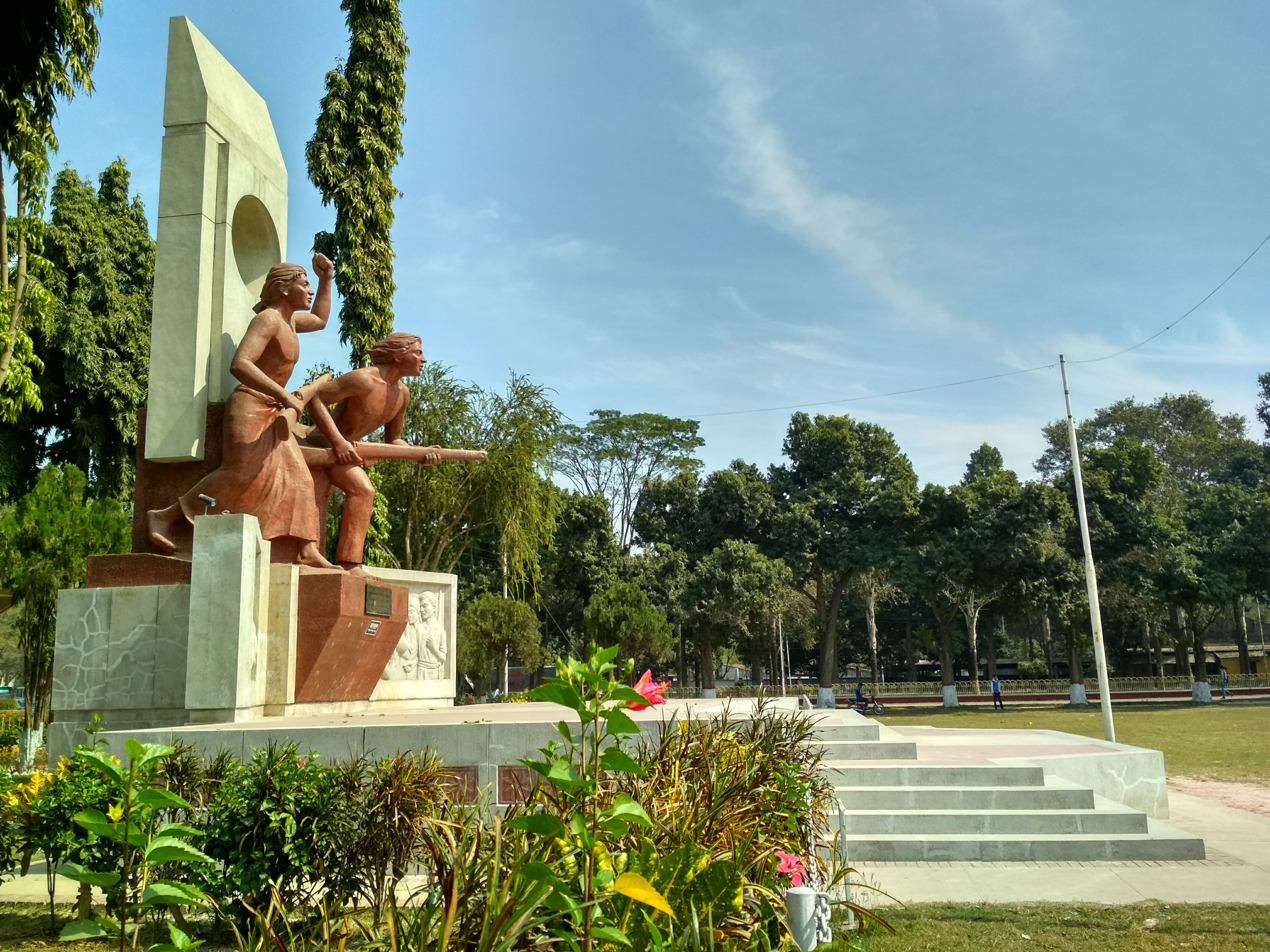

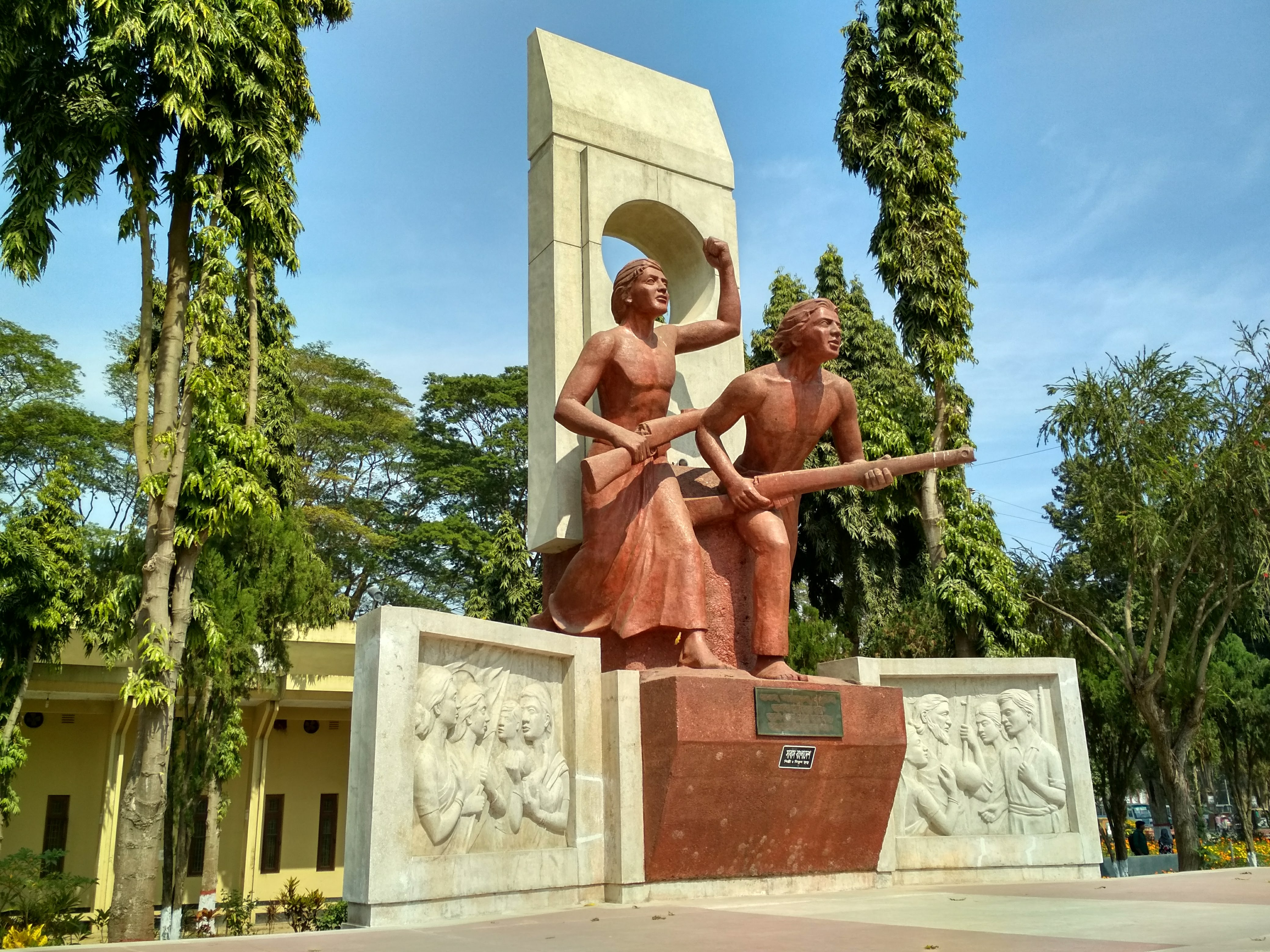

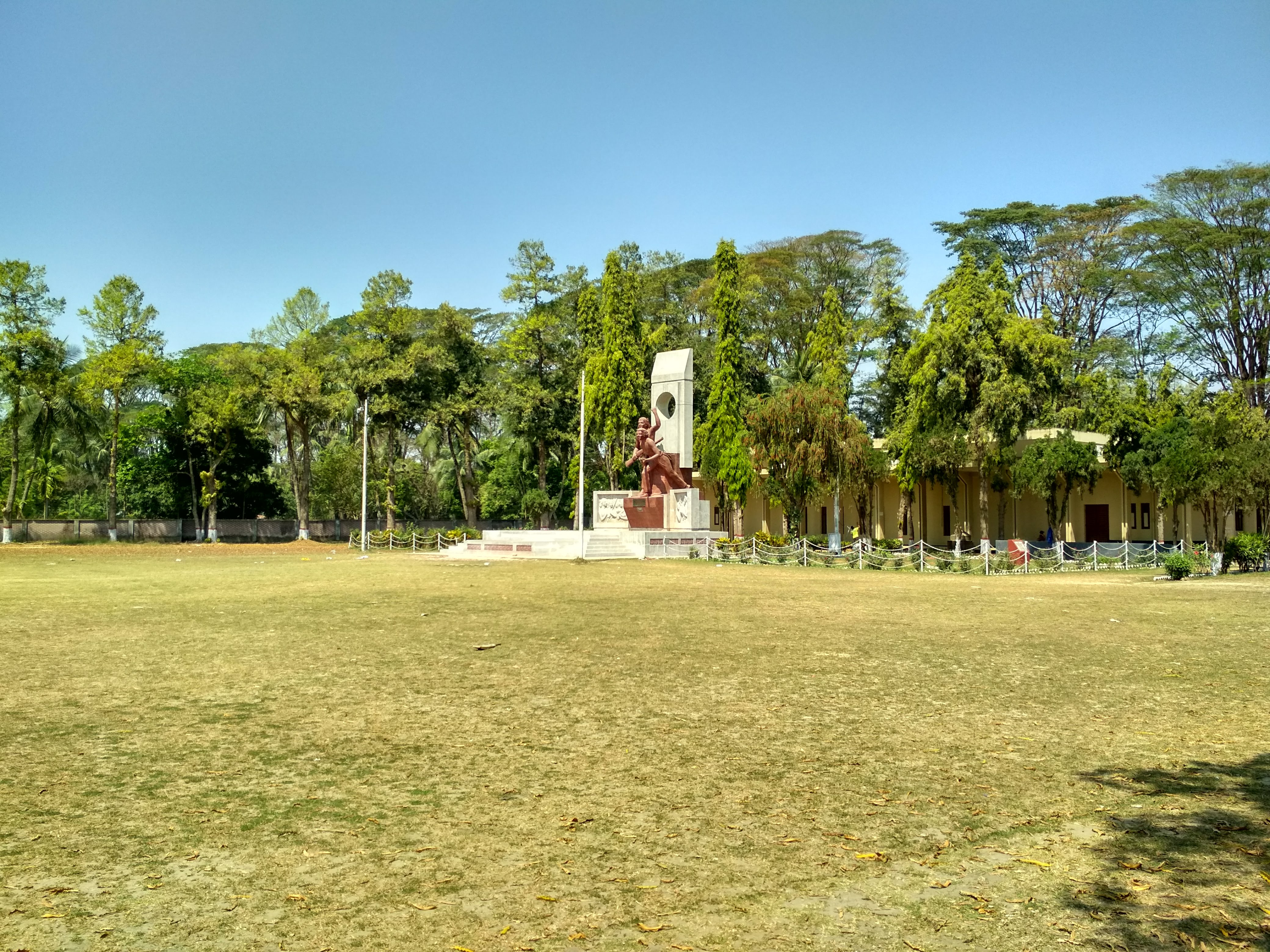
