= Nasir Uddin Chowdhury (politician) =

Bangladeshi politician

- নাসির উদ্দিন চৌধুরী

Sunamganj-2 Jatiya Sangsad
- In office 17 February 2026
- Preceded by: Mifta Uddin Chowdhury Rumi
- Succeeded by: Suranjit Sengupta
- In office June 1996 – 2001

Personal details
- Born: Sunamganj, Bangladesh
- Party: Jatiya Party Bangladesh Nationalist Party
- Spouse: Rabeya Chowdhury

Nasir Uddin Chowdhury is a politician in Sunamganj District of Sylhet Division of Bangladesh and incumbent member of Parliament from Sunamganj - 2. He was elected Member of Parliament from the Sunamganj-2 (Derai-Shala) seat for the Jatiya Party in the June 1996 7th parliamentary elections.

== Birth and early life ==
Nasir Uddin Chowdhury was born in Sunamganj district of Sylhet division.

== Political life ==
Nasir Uddin Chowdhury is a central member of the Bangladesh Nationalist Party. He was elected Member of Parliament from the Sunamganj-2 (Derai-Shala) seat for the Jatiya Party in the June 1996 7th parliamentary elections. He was defeated by participating in the elections for the BNP in the Jatiya Sangsad elections of 2001, 2008 and 2018.

== See also ==
- June 1996 Bangladeshi general election
- Sunamganj-2
- Bangladesh Nationalist Party
