= Derai =

Derai দিরাই
- Town and Municipality
- Location within Bangladesh
- Coordinates: 25°2′N 91°40′E
- Country: Bangladesh
- Division: Sylhet Division
- District: Sunamganj
- Upazila: Derai Upazila
- Municipality: 1999

Government
  - Mayor: Bisawjeet Roy

Area
  - Total: 6.5 km^{2} (2.5 sq mi)

Population (2011)
  - Total: 22,680
  - Density: 3,489/km^{2} (9,040/sq mi)
- Time zone: UTC+6 (BST)
- Website: www.deraipaurashava.gov.bd

Derai Municipality mahallah geocode map

Derai (Bengali: দিরাই, romanized: Dirai) is a town and municipal corporation in Derai Upazila of Sunamganj District in northeastern Bangladesh, and forms part of the Sylhet Division. This region is particularly known for its extensive wetland ecosystems that play a crucial role in the local environment and economy. The topography of Derai is largely low-lying, making it susceptible to seasonal flooding. The economy of Derai is predominantly agrarian, with agriculture and fishing being the main sources of income for the majority of the population.

== History ==
Derai was previously known as Babaganj Bazar. It was home to two influential Hindu residents; Jitarāma and Dvidarāma, who renamed the area to Derai Bazar. On 10 December 1892, an Assam Gazette notification recognised the name of the area as Derai. In 1938, the Nankar Rebellion started in Derai and surrounding areas. Derai was made the headquarters of a namesake thana in 1942 and the capital of the namesake upazila in 1982.

== Geography ==
Derai Sarmangal is a town and municipal corporation in Derai Upazila of Sunamganj District in northeastern Bangladesh, and forms part of the Sylhet Division. The region is characterized by its numerous haors, which are large, saucer-shaped depressions or inland lakes that are extensively flooded during the monsoon season and form vast sheets of water. These wetlands are a dominant feature of the landscape. It covers an area of 420.93 km^{2} (162.52 sq mi). Derai Municipality is subdivided into nine wards and 29 mahallas.

== Demographics ==
According to the Population and Housing Census 2022 conducted by the Bangladesh Bureau of Statistics (BBS), Derai municipality had a population of 32,154 which includes 17,063 males and 15,091 females. The total population of Derai Upazila was 269,726 people with the male population at 136,134 and the female population at 133,592. The literacy rate (7 years and above) in Derai was 69.83%.

Agriculture remains primary livelihood. The extensive haor system supports extensive rice cultivation and freshwater fishery, providing significant income and food resources for a large portion of the population in the region. The Derai Upazila Health Complex has limited healthcare facilities.
