= Nitun Kundu =

Bangladeshi artist (1935–2006)

- নিতুন কুন্ডু
- Born: 3 December 1935; Dinajpur district, Bengal Presidency, British India
- Died: 15 September 2006 (aged 70); Dhaka, Bangladesh
- Occupations: Sculptor, painter and entrepreneur
- Awards: Ekushey Padak

Nitya Gopal Kundu (3 December 1935 – 15 September 2006) was a Bangladeshi artist, sculptor and entrepreneur. Kundu played an important role during the liberation war of Bangladesh in 1971. He founded the furniture company Otobi.

== Early life ==
Kundu was born in Dinajpur district to his Kayastha parents Gnanendranath Kundu and Binapani Kundu. He was the fourth among seven siblings. Kundu was married to Phalguni Kundu and had a daughter Amity and a son Animesh.

== Education and early career ==
Kundu graduated from Dhaka Art College (now the Institute of Fine Arts) in 1959. In the years leading up to 1971, he worked at the United States Information Service (USIS) in Dhaka designing exhibits and graphics.

== Liberation War ==
During the Bangladesh Liberation War, Kundu worked with the artist Quamrul Hassan at the public relations department of the Bangladesh Government-in-Exile at Mujibnagar. In collaboration with Hassan and a group of notable artists namely Debdas Chakraborty, Nasir Biswas, Pranesh Mandal and Biren Shome; Kundu worked on numerous posters and works of art aimed at arousing the newly formed Mukti Bahini liberation army and also raising awareness of the genocide being unleashed by the Pakistan Army on the people of Bangladesh.

.

It was during this period he designed two posters which became among the most recognized works of art produced during the war. They were titled Sada Jagrata Banglar Mukti Bahini and Banglar Hindu, Banglar Bouddha, Banglar Christian, Banglar Musalman; Amra Sabai Bangali.

The Liberation War was the inspiration for Kundu's most famous work, the sculpture Shabash Bangladesh, a tribute to the fallen freedom fighters of the Mukti Bahini. This is situated on the campus of Rajshahi University.

== Entrepreneur ==
In the 1975, following a brief stint at Bitopi advertising agency, Kundu established his own company, a furniture store featuring his own designs, Otobi. Within a relatively short period, Otobi became the most prominent Bangladeshi furniture brand. He started the company with an initial investment of 5000 taka.

== Works ==
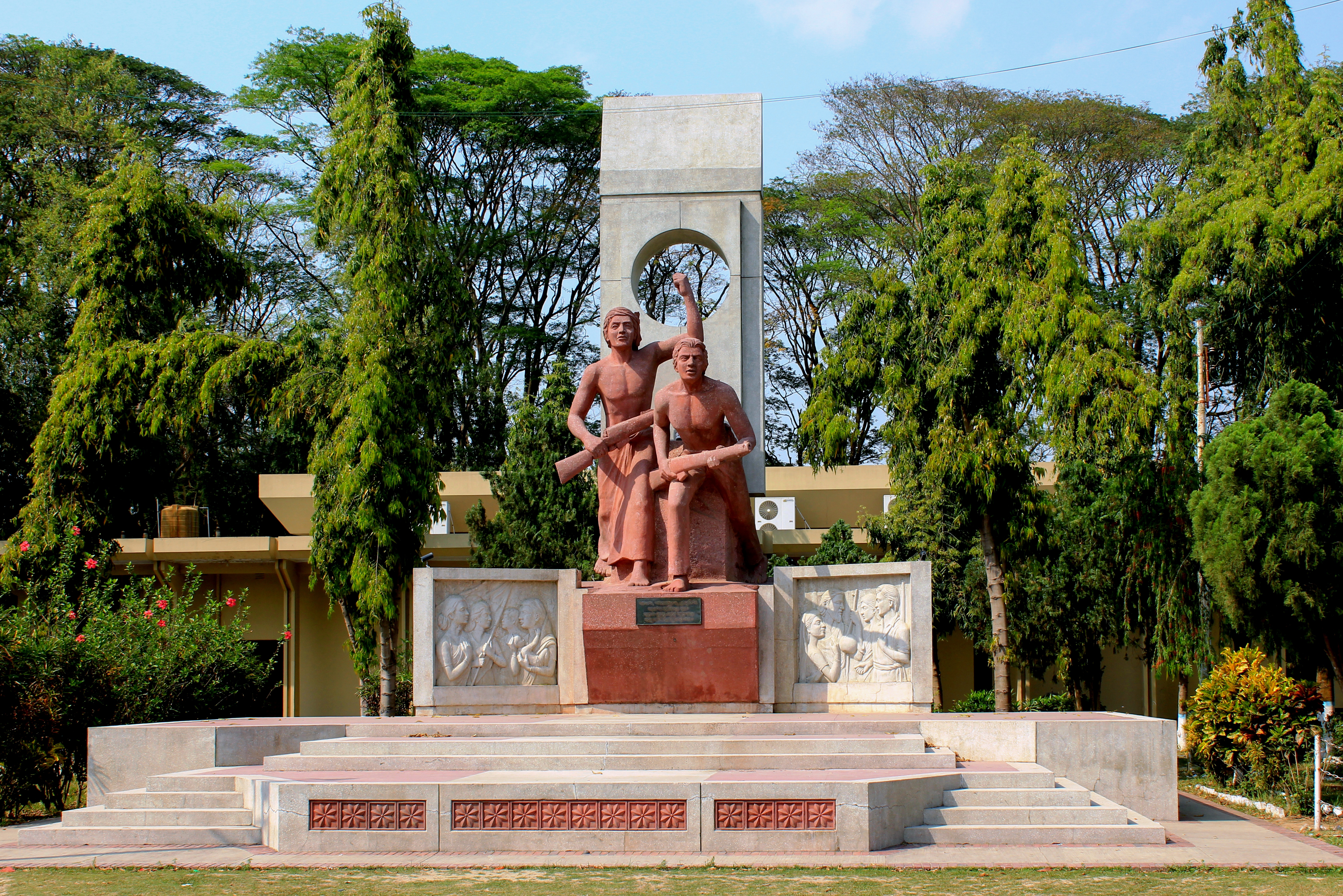
Shabash Bangladesh

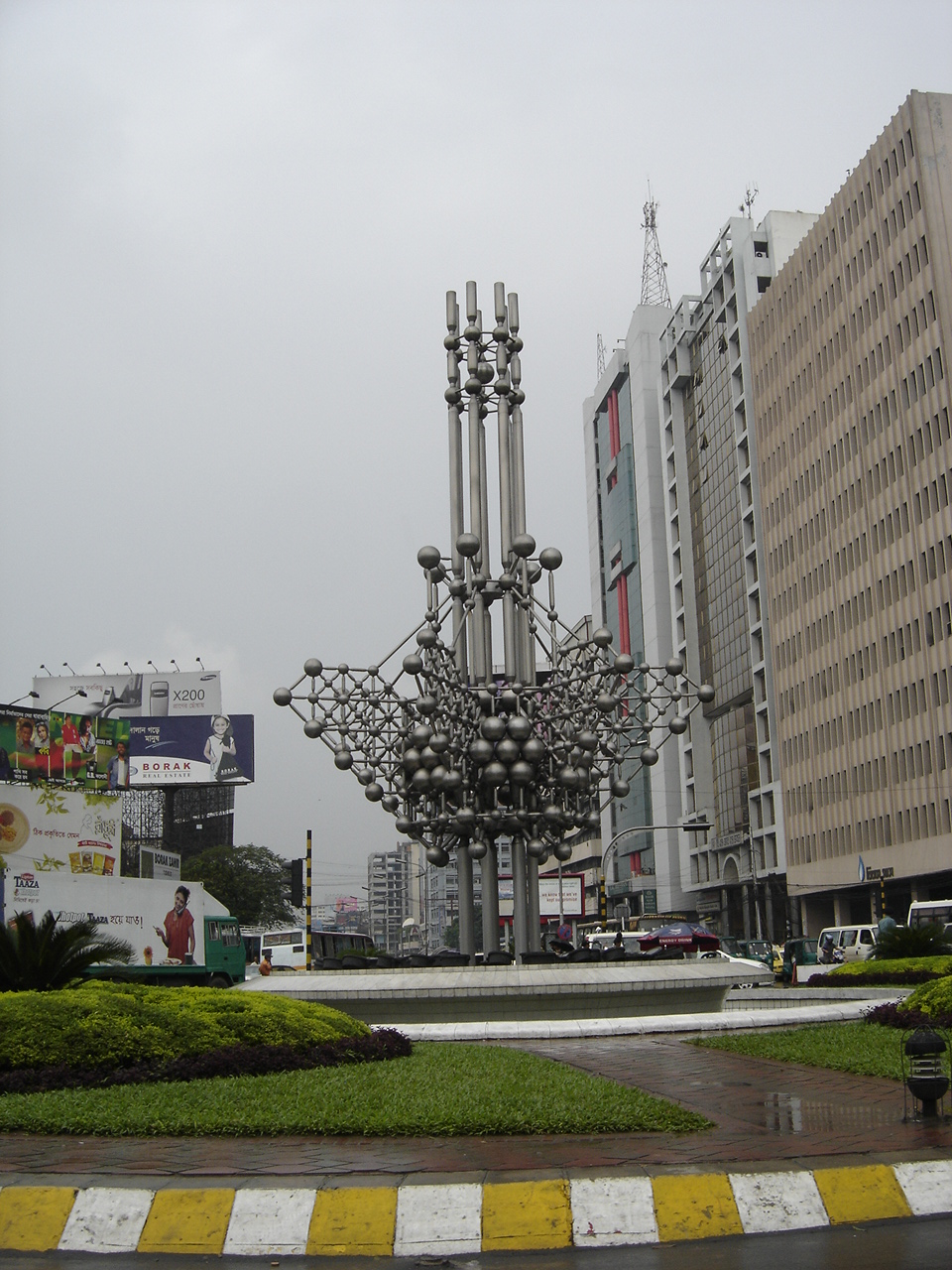
The SAARC fountain, Dhaka

Kundu crafted several national trophies including National Film Award, President Gold Cup, Notun Kuri Award, Asia Cricket Cup, and the Ekushey Padak.

His some notables works are the following:

- Sada Jagrata Banglar Muktibahini (poster)
- Amra Sabai Bangali (poster)
- Banglar Bir Muktijoddha (poster)
- Shabash Bangladesh (sculpture at University of Rajshahi)
- SAARC Fountain at Karwan Bazar, Dhaka
- Fountain, Dhaka High Court, Dhaka
- Sampan, Shah Amanat International Airport, Chittagong
- Kadam Fountain, National Press Club, Dhaka

== Death ==
Kundu died of old age complications at Ibrahim Memorial Cardiac Centre in Dhaka on 15 September 2006.

== Awards and honors ==
- Ekushey Padak (1997)
- Daily Star-DHL Best Entrepreneur Award
- National Film Award
- President Gold Cup
- Notun Kuri Award (Bangladesh Television)
