= Saleh Chowdhury =

- Born: c. 1941; Sunamganj, East Bengal, British India
- Died: 1 September 2023
- Occupation: Journalist
- Known for: Journalism, Bangladesh Liberation War
- Notable work: Editor at Dainik Bangla

Saleh Chowdhury (c. 1941 – 1 September 2023) was a Bangladeshi journalist, Mukti Bahini personnel, and president of the Bangladesh chapter of the Commonwealth Journalists Association. He was known for his contributions to journalism and involvement in the Bangladesh Liberation War.

== Early life and education ==
Chowdhury was born in Sunamganj District, East Bengal, British India. He pursued higher education at Murari Chand College. During his college years, he launched a short-lived literary journal, Ishara. He later attended Punjab University on a scholarship.

== Career ==
Chowdhury began his journalism career with early roles in several newspapers. He also briefly taught at the University Laboratory School and College. He later joined Dainik Pakistan (which was later renamed Dainik Bangla), where he worked until his retirement as a senior editor. Throughout his career, he worked closely with prominent literary figures, including poet Shamsur Rahman and novelist Humayun Ahmed. He edited several volumes of Humayun Ahmed's collected works.

In April 1971, during the Bangladesh Liberation War, Chowdhury joined the Mukti Bahini against Pakistani occupation forces in Sunamganj District. He was trained in India. Following the war's conclusion in December 1971, he resumed his position at Dainik Bangla. He also built a Sheheed Minar in Sunamganj District as a monument to the Bangladesh Liberation War.

Chowdhury was a member of the Jatiya Press Club. He was elected president of the Commonwealth Journalist Association's Bangladesh Chapter, replacing Farid Hossain, who had been appointed Press Minister at the Bangladesh High Commission in India. He donated his shirt from the Bangladesh Liberation War to the Bangladesh Liberation War museum.

== Death ==
Chowdhury died on 1 September 2023. Bangladesh Police provided a guard of honour at his funeral. Mirza Fakhrul Islam Alamgir, general secretary of the Bangladesh Nationalist Party, sent his condolences.
