= Shah Arefin Tila =

- Hillock (rocky terrain)
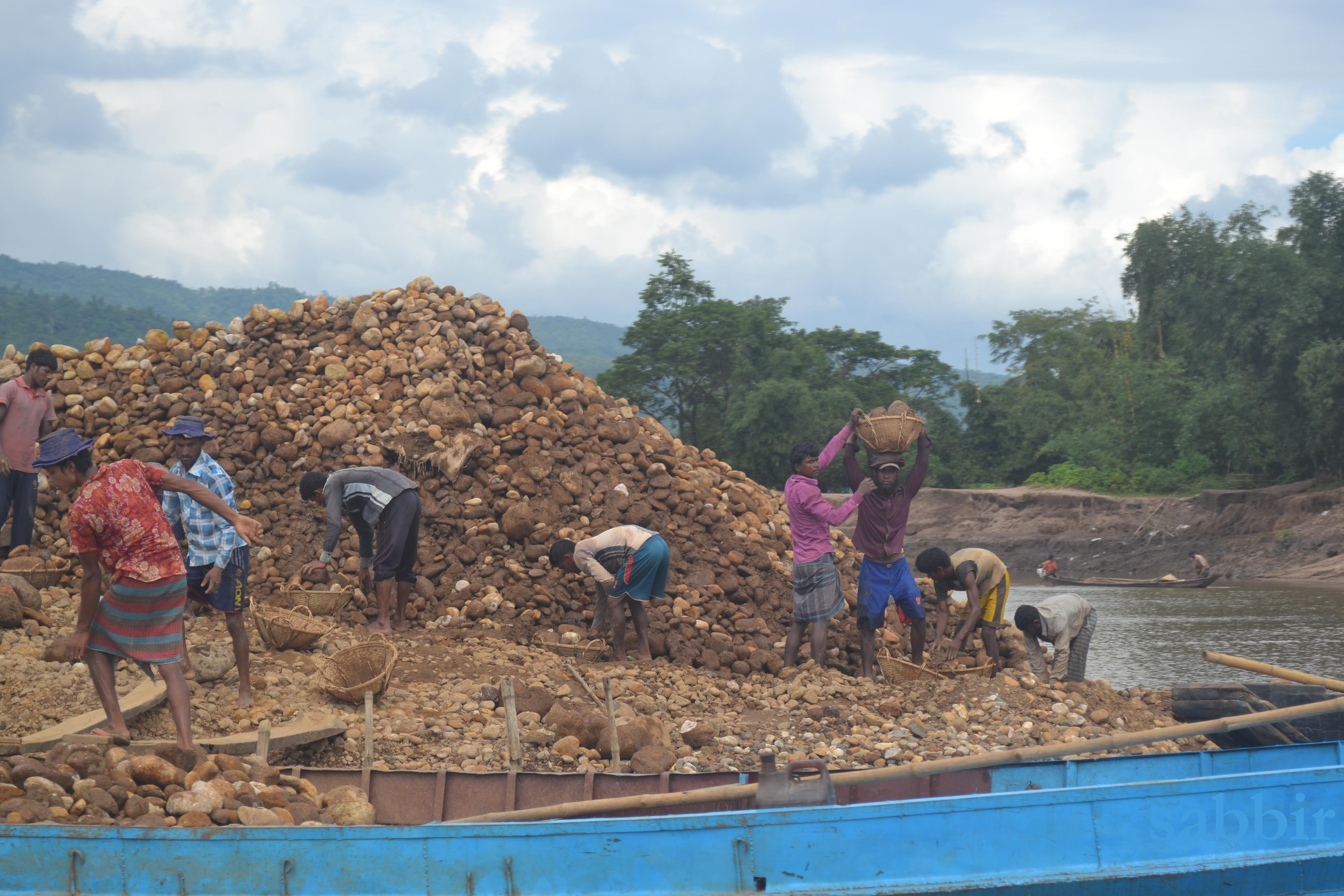
- Workers collecting stones from Shah Arefin Tila

- Location in Bangladesh
- Coordinates: 25°08′05″N 91°43′00″E
- Country: Bangladesh
- Division: Sylhet Division
- District: Sylhet District
- Upazila: Companiganj
- For location and geographic context, see Companiganj and Piyain River.

Shah Arefin Tila is a stone-rich hillock located in Companiganj Upazila of Sylhet District, Bangladesh, recognized as part of the 'white stone' region. It holds both geological and touristic significance. In 2016, the Government of Bangladesh banned stone extraction from areas like Jaflong, Bholaganj, Shah Arefin Tila, Bichanakandi, and parts of Lovachhara in Sylhet's quarry zone. Later, in 2025, the Interim Government of Muhammad Yunus suspended leases of 17 quarries nationwide.

Shah Arefin Tila once comprised two large hillocks spanning about 500 acres. Locals often called it a 'stone mine' due to the many large and small boulders beneath layers of reddish-brown clay. However, long-term quarrying and illegal excavation have caused major damage to the landscape.

== Etymology ==
According to folklore, over seven hundred years ago, Hazrat Shah Jalal's companion Hazrat Shah Arefin would rest atop the hill during his travels through the Khasi hill region. The name 'Shah Arefin Tila' originates from this resting place. The hill is also geologically significant for its large deposits of rocks beneath the surface, making it attractive for mineral extraction but also a source of environmental concern.

== Geographical Location ==
Shah Arefin Tila is located near the border in Companiganj, Sylhet. Branches of the Piyain River and Dauki (Jaflong) River flow nearby. The region is famous for river-carried pebbles and prehistoric rocks. It lies within the white stone zone influenced by the Jaflong–Piyain–Dauki water system.

Government records show 137.5 acres as registered state land, though the broader area is considered to span around 500 acres. The north borders the Khasi hills, the south is flanked by riverine settlements, and the east-west landscape alternates between hillocks and lowlands. During monsoon, stones and boulders naturally deposit here from upstream flows.

== Stone Extraction ==
Quarry-based stone extraction expanded in Sylhet during the late 1990s, prompting legal actions over the use of heavy machinery in places like Jaflong and Bholaganj. Environmental laws were cited in court petitions.

Despite a 2016 ban due to safety and environmental concerns, illegal extraction persisted, even after leases were suspended during the COVID-19 pandemic in 2020. On 27 April 2025, the government again suspended 17 quarry leases.

Over the past 25 years, unregulated mining activities caused severe degradation, with as much as 85% of the hill structure lost since the early 2000s, particularly after illegal use of mechanical 'bomb machines' from 2014–15.

=== Employment and Labor Hazards ===
A 2014 study examined the economic viability of hard rock mining in Companiganj, concluding that environmental and social impacts must be considered alongside profitability.

According to a report by Prothom Alo citing the Bangladesh Environmental Lawyers Association – BELA, 38 workers died in landslides from 14 February 2005 to 14 December 2021 at Shah Arefin Tila.

== Recent Situation (2024–25) ==
In 2024–25, there were numerous allegations and reports of illegal extraction and looting of ‘white stone’ from Shah Arefin Tila, prompting government crackdowns. Investigative reports highlighted large-scale looting, involvement of local syndicates, and administrative inaction. Authorities recovered a significant amount of stolen stone during joint operations.

In response, the government announced deployment of joint forces, recovery of stolen stones, and a review of lease policies.

Stone-based quarrying in Sylhet has caused erosion, river course changes, noise and dust pollution, and biodiversity loss. Studies show the environmental, social, and administrative challenges in ecologically critical areas (ECA) like Jaflong–Dauki, with negative effects on indigenous communities such as the Khasi.

Sustainable management and community participation in ECAs have long been recommended. The IUCN Bangladesh has documented experiences from such efforts. The Jaflong–Dauki floodplain is also identified as a sensitive zone in international reports like the CBD’s Aichi Target 11 dossier.

== Legal Framework ==
Key legal instruments regarding mineral extraction and environmental management in the area include:

- Environment Conservation Act, 1995 (Act No. 1 of 1995) – Provides the government powers for environmental conservation, pollution control, and ECA declaration.
- Environment Conservation Rules, 1997 – Defines project classifications (Green/Orange/Red), EIA/IEE standards, and ECA-related restrictions.
- Ecologically Critical Areas Management Rules, 2016 – Governance, committees, and local participation structure for ECAs.
- Mines and Mineral Resources (Control and Development) Act, 1992 and Rules, 2012 – Detailed provisions for quarry control, licensing, royalty, etc.
- National Conservation Strategy (2021–2036) – Guidelines for biodiversity and ECA/natural resource management.

== Role of the Court ==
Despite existing policies, poor enforcement and law violations in Sylhet’s quarry sector prompted ongoing legal actions by citizens and environmental organizations. Since 2005, courts have issued rulings—such as WP 7552/2015 in 2017—mandating application of the Environment Conservation Act 1995, Environment Rules 1997, and Forest Act 1927. The 2025 suspension of quarry leases was also seen as part of this policy reassessment.

== See also ==
- Jaflong
- Bholaganj
- Bichnakandi
- Piyain River
