= Sayful Alam =

Bangladeshi politician and teacher

Muhammad Sayful Alam
- ছয়ফুল আলম

Member of the East Pakistan Legislative Assembly
- In office 12 May 1962 – 1963
- Preceded by: Faizul Hasan
- Succeeded by: Khandakar Abdul Jalil
- Constituency: PE-113 (Sylhet-IV)

Chairman of the Gowainghat Upazila Council
- In office 16 May 1985 – 16 May 1990
- Preceded by: Post established
- Succeeded by: Dildar Hossain Selim

Personal details
- Born: 7 March 1934 Gowainghat, Sylhet district, British Raj
- Died: 14 January 1997 (aged 62) Bangladesh
- Education: BA

Muhammad Sayful Alam (Bengali: মোঃ ছয়ফুল আলম; 7 March 1934 – 14 January 1997) was a Bangladeshi politician and teacher. He was a member of the East Pakistan Legislative Assembly. He had made extensive contributions to the overall development of Gowainghat Upazila.

== Early life and education ==
Sayful Alam was born on 7 March 1934, in Purnanagar, Gowainghat, located in the Sylhet district of the British Raj. He passed his Intermediate of Arts in 1954, and earned his Bachelor of Arts two years later.

== Career ==
Alam began his career as a teacher at the Gowainghat High School for two years. His entrance to politics started at the Basic Democracy elections held in 1959 under Ayub Khan's military rule. He became a member initially, and then later the uncontested chairman of the constituency. Alam participated in the May 1962 Basic Democracy elections, becoming a member of the East Pakistan Legislative Assembly, representing the PE-113 (Sylhet-IV) constituency. According to Ehsanul Haq Jasim, Alam was convicted in a murder case eighteen months later and his seat became void. A by-election was held with Khandakar Abdul Jalil being nominated. He was later found to be innocent. Gowainghat was made an upazila (sub-district) in 1983 as part of the President of Bangladesh Hussain Muhammad Ershad's decentralisation programme and Alam was appointed as the inaugural chairman of the Gowainghat Upazila Council in 1985. Alam was also the elected founding chairman of the undivided Alirgaon Union.

== Death and legacy ==
Alam died on 14 January 1967 and was buried in the Purnanagar Graveyard. He had several children including Muazzam Husayn Ripon. In 1999, the President of Bangladesh Hussain Muhammad Ershad visited Alam's grave along with Abdul Hannan and MP Nasir Ahmad of Derai-Sullah. The condition of the graveyard is presently not well preserved.
