= Bholaganj =

Village in Sylhet Division, Bangladesh

Bholaganj Sada Pathor

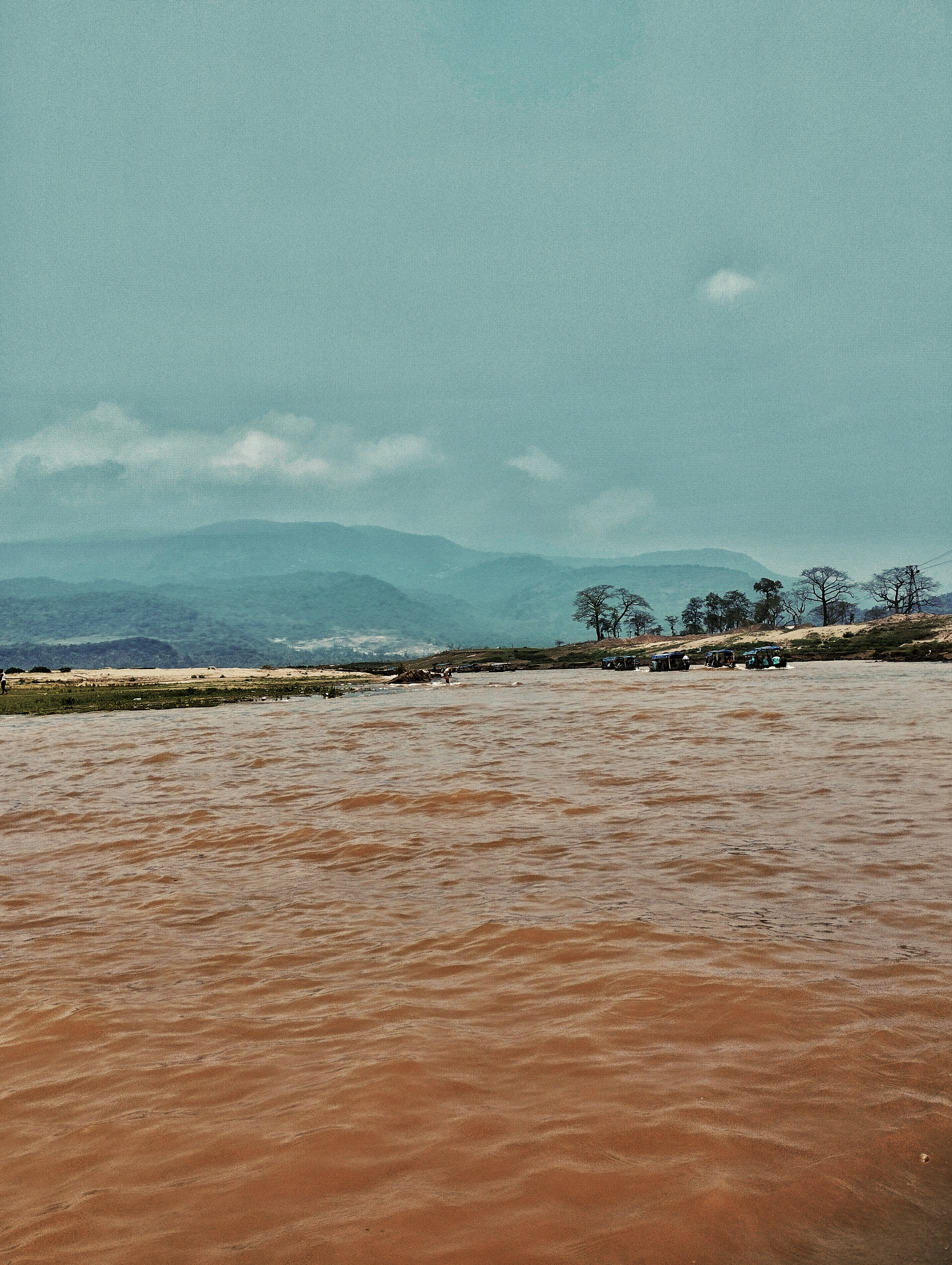
Bholaganj Shada Pathor (white stone) view

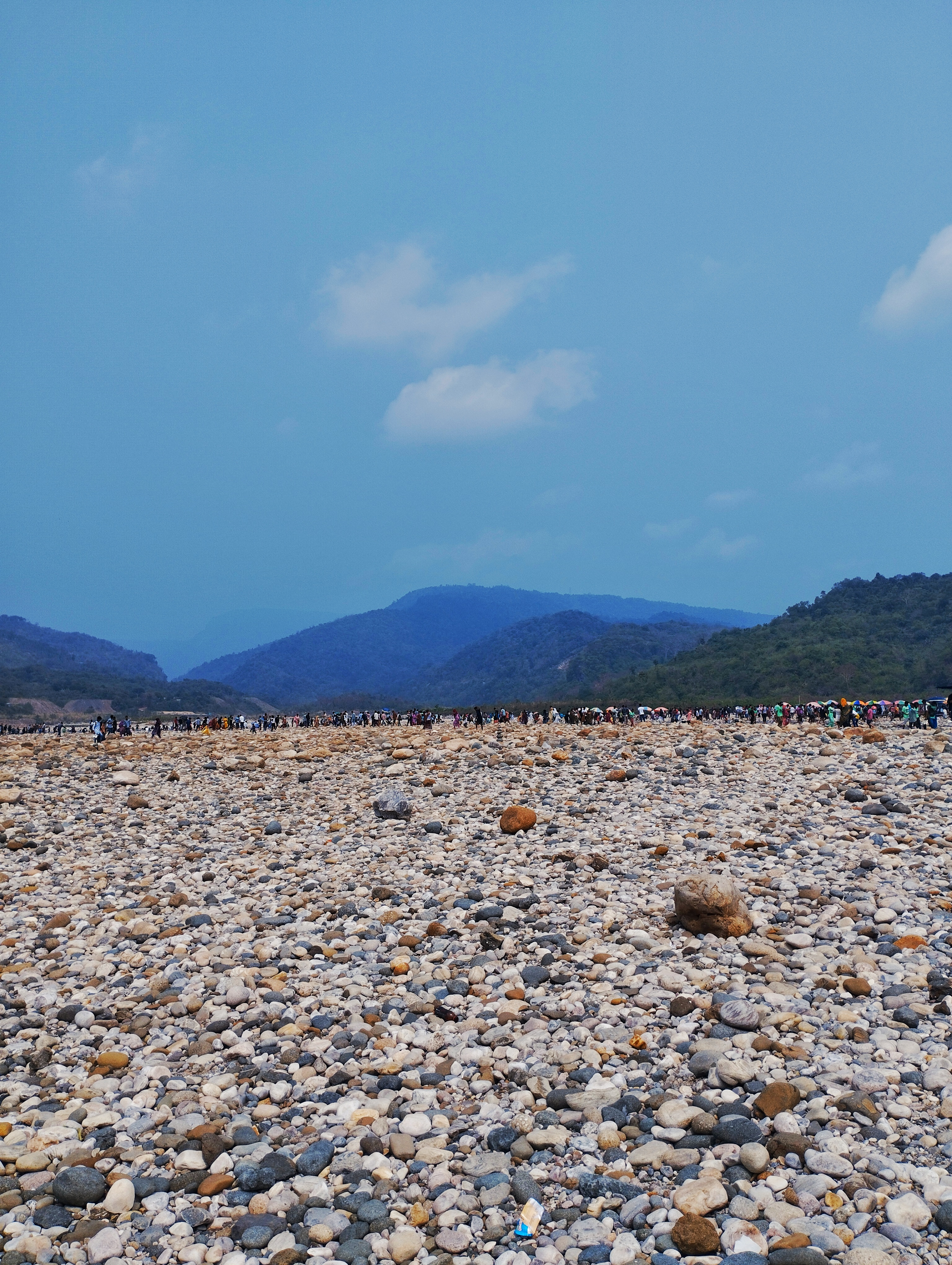
Bholaganj Shada Pathor (white stone) view

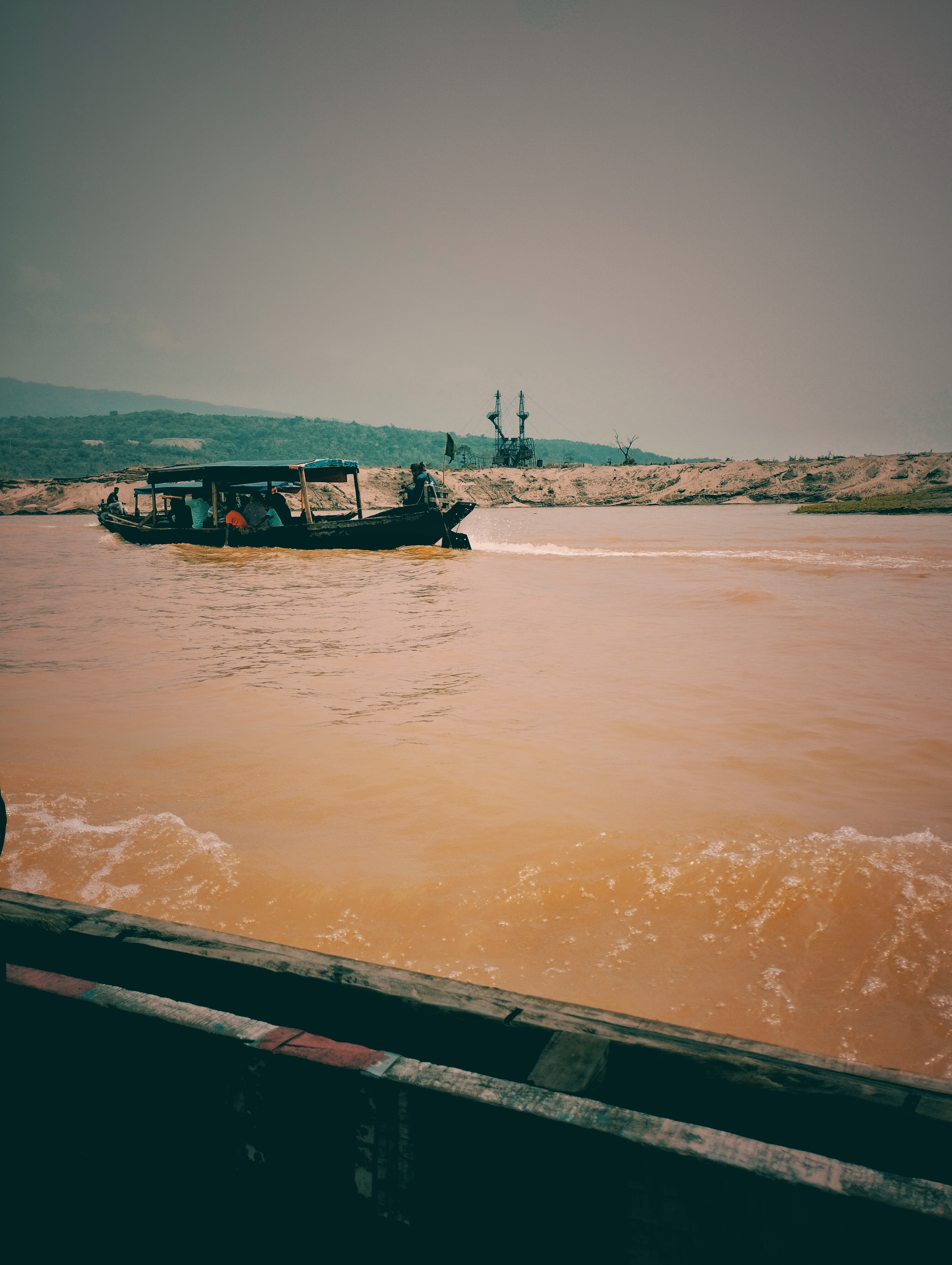
Bholaganj Shada Pathor (white stone) view

Bholaganj is a village in Sylhet District, Bangladesh, within the Companiganj upazila. It is located on the banks of the Dhalai River. The Dhalai River in Bholaganj is the largest stone quarry area in the country. From here up to Chhatak, the 11-kilometer-long Bholaganj Ropeway (cableway) stands.

== Location ==
Located in Sylhet District's Companiganj Upazila, Bholaganj is a place known for its geographical features. The area features a combination of the ropeway, stone quarry, river, and surrounding hills. The distance from Sylhet city to Bholaganj is about 33 kilometers. The Dhalai River enters Bangladesh, divides into two parts, flows around the plant area, and then reunites. In the upazila headquarters area, the Dhalai River meets the Piyain River. The ropeway area, covering about one hundred acres, is now a recognized tourist spot.

== History ==
In earlier times, people used to travel through this route to reach Shillong, then the capital of Assam province in India. Over time, a cableway was established here, named the Bholaganj Ropeway. The country’s one of largest Bholaganj stone quarry is also located in this area.

== Customs station ==
There is a land customs station in Bholaganj. Import and export activities are carried out through this station. Standing at this customs station near the zero line of the India border, one can observe the scenery across the frontier.

== See also ==
- Kulumchhara Waterfall
- Lalakhal
