= Sylhet-4 =

Constituency of Bangladesh's Jatiya Sangsad

Coordinates: 25.09°N 91.98°E

- Constituency for the Jatiya Sangsad
- District: Sylhet District
- Division: Sylhet Division
- Electorate: 512,933 (2026)

Current constituency
- Created: 1973
- Party: Bangladesh Nationalist Party
- Member: Ariful Haque Choudhury
- ← 231 Sylhet-3 233 Sylhet-5 →

Sylhet-4 is a constituency represented in the Jatiya Sangsad (National Parliament) of Bangladesh since 2026 by Ariful Haque Choudhury of the Bangladesh Nationalist Party.

== Boundaries ==
The constituency encompasses Companiganj, Gowainghat, and Jaintiapur upazilas.

== History ==
The constituency was created for the first general elections in newly independent Bangladesh, held in 1973.

Ahead of the 2008 general election, the Election Commission redrew constituency boundaries to reflect population changes revealed by the 2001 Bangladesh census. The 2008 redistricting altered the boundaries of the constituency.

== Members of Parliament ==
Election	Member	Party
1973	A. H. M. Abdul Hai	Awami League
1979	Iqbal Hossain Chowdhury	Bangladesh Nationalist Party
Major Boundary Changes
1986	Imran Ahmad	Awami League
1988	Abdul Hannan	Awami League
1991	Imran Ahmad	Awami League
Feb 1996	Saifur Rahman	Bangladesh Nationalist Party
Jun 1996	Saifur Rahman	Bangladesh Nationalist Party
Sep 1996 by-election	Imran Ahmad	Awami League
2001	Dildar Hossain Selim	Bangladesh Nationalist Party
2008	Imran Ahmad	Awami League
2014	Imran Ahmad	Awami League
2018	Imran Ahmad	Awami League
2024	Imran Ahmad	Awami League
2026	Ariful Haque Choudhury	Bangladesh Nationalist Party

== Elections ==
=== Elections in the 2020s ===
General Election 2026: Sylhet-4 (Note: The vote counts given by The Business Standard are incomplete.)
Party	Candidate	Votes	%	±%
BNP	Ariful Haque Chowdhury	186,846	70.9	N/A
Jamaat	Md. Joynal Abedin	71,391	27.1	N/A
IAB	Sayeed Ahmed	2,724	1.0	N/A
JP(E)	Mohammad Mujibur Rahman	1,966	0.7	N/A
GOP	Zahirul Islam	561	0.2	N/A
Majority		115,455	43.8	N/A
Turnout		263,488	51.4	N/A
Registered electors		512,933		
BNP gain from AL				

=== Elections in the 2010s ===
General Election 2014: Sylhet-4
Party	Candidate	Votes	%	±%
AL	Imran Ahmad	63,323	72.3	+13.2
Independent	Mohammad Faruk Ahmed	24,274	27.7	N/A
Majority		39,049	44.6	+25.9
Turnout		87,597	26.8	−59.2
AL hold				

=== Elections in the 2000s ===
General Election 2008: Sylhet-4
Party	Candidate	Votes	%	±%
AL	Imran Ahmad	144,198	59.1	+24.5
BNP	Dildar Hossain Selim	98,545	40.4	N/A
Bangladesh Kalyan Party	Mohammad Helal Uddin	1,252	0.5	N/A
Majority		45,653	18.7	+8.0
Turnout		243,995	86.0	+15.4
AL gain from BNP				

General Election 2001: Sylhet-4
Party	Candidate	Votes	%	±%
BNP	Dildar Hossain Selim	62,324	45.3	
AL	Imran Ahmad	47,608	34.6	
JUI	Mohammad Ali	19,256	14.0	
IJOF	Kazi Kamal Ahmad	8,171	5.9	
Jatiya Party (M)	Rashid Helali	332	0.2	
Majority		14,716	10.7	
Turnout		137,691	70.6	
BNP hold				

=== Elections in the 1990s ===
Saifur Rahman stood for three seats in the June 1996 general election, and won two of them: Sylhet-4 and Moulvibazar-3. He chose to represent Moulvibazar-3 and quit Sylhet-4, triggering a by-election. His main opponent from the general election, Imran Ahmad, was elected in a September 1996 by-election.

General Election June 1996: Sylhet-4
Party	Candidate	Votes	%	±%
BNP	Saifur Rahman	23,946	25.8	−1.2
AL	Imran Ahmad	22,725	24.5	−18.3
Independent	Dildar Hossain Selim	17,009	18.3	N/A
Jamiat Ulema-e-Islam Bangladesh	Nurul Islam	14,294	15.4	N/A
JP(E)	Md. Siraj Uddin	10,578	11.4	N/A
Jamaat	Abdul Mannan	3,095	3.3	N/A
Zaker Party	Golam Kader Talukdar	557	0.6	−3.1
Independent	Md. Abdul Ahad	359	0.4	N/A
Independent	Md. Muslim Uddin Bhuiyan	218	0.2	N/A
Jatiya Samajtantrik Dal-JSD	Monir Uddin Master	147	0.2	−24.0
Majority		1,221	1.3	−14.5
Turnout		92,928	61.9	+26.9
BNP gain from AL				

General Election 1991: Sylhet-4
Party	Candidate	Votes	%	±%
AL	Imran Ahmad	23,018	42.8	
BNP	Nazim Kamran Choudhury	14,508	27.0	
Jatiya Samajtantrik Dal-JSD	Monir Uddin Master	13,008	24.2	
Zaker Party	Shafiqur Rahman	2,016	3.7	
JSD	Nasir Uddin	1,109	2.1	
Islami Samajtantrik Dal	Mosammat Minara Begum	172	0.3	
Majority		8,510	15.8	
Turnout		53,831	35.0	
AL gain from				
