= Kulumchhara Waterfall =

Kulum Chhara Waterfall
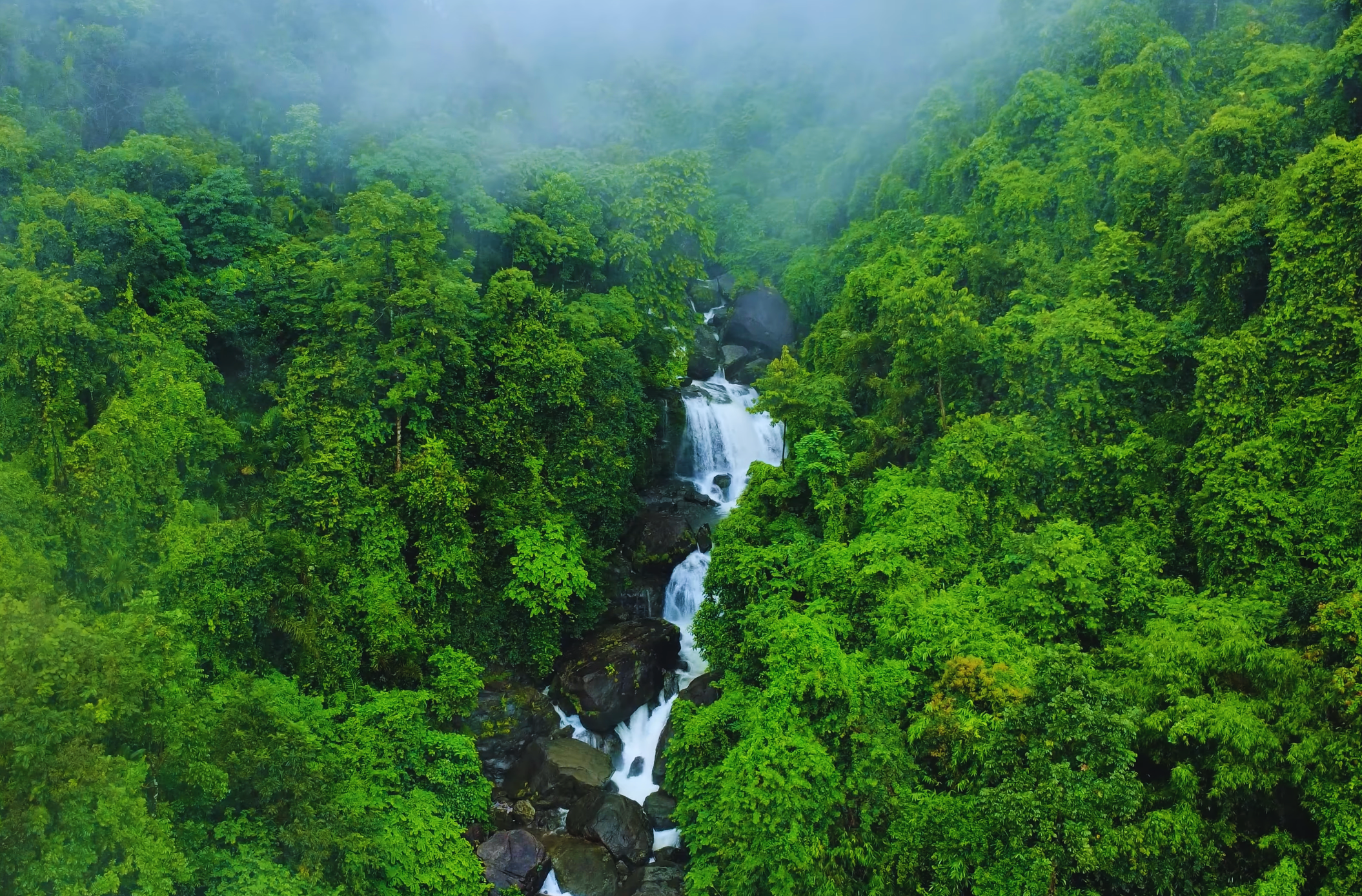
- Location: Gowainghat, Sylhet, Bangladesh
- Type: Hill waterfall

Kulum Chhara (Bengali: কুলুমছড়া) is a waterfall located in Gowainghat Upazila, Sylhet District, Bangladesh. It is essentially the final section of a waterfall that originates in India.

== Location ==
Kulumchhara is a village located near the Sonarhat border in Gowainghat Upazila of Sylhet. The waterfall, which is known by the same name, is situated near the Bangladesh–India border. It originates from a stream that flows from the Indian state of Meghalaya.

== Tourism ==
Kulumchhara has gained attention among domestic travelers seeking less-crowded natural attractions near Bichnakandi. Visitors typically reach the area via Gowainghat and nearby river routes. The best time to visit is during the monsoon and post-monsoon months, when water flow is strongest and surrounding hills are covered with dense greenery.

== Environmental concerns ==
Like other tourist destinations in the Bichnakandi region, the surrounding environment has faced challenges related to stone extraction and increasing tourism pressure. Environmental groups and local observers have expressed concerns about preserving the area's ecological balance and natural landscape.
