= Companiganj Upazila =

Companiganj is the name of two Upazilas in Bangladesh:

- Companiganj Upazila, Noakhali
- Companiganj Upazila, Sylhet
