= Faizul Hasan =

Bangladeshi politician

Member of the East Bengal Legislative Assembly
- In office 1956–1962
- Preceded by: Mokbul Hossain
- Succeeded by: Sayful Alam
- Constituency: Sylhet Sadar-N

Personal details
- Born: Daubari, Gowainghat, Sylhet District

Faizul Hasan (Bengali: ফয়জুল হাসান) was a Bangladeshi politician.

== Biography ==
Hasan was born into a Bengali Muslim family from Daubari in Gowainghat, Sylhet District. He was successful in a 1956 by-election for the East Bengal Legislative Assembly. Hasan participated in the 1973 Bangladeshi general election as a National Awami Party candidate but reached third place, losing to Habibur Rahman of the Awami League.
