= Bichnakandi =

Tourist spot in Sylhet district

Coordinates: 25.167°N 91.888°E

Bichhanakandi বিছানাকান্দি Bisnakandi
- Village
- Bisnakandi Picnic Point Tourist help ;Bisnakandi Tourism Club
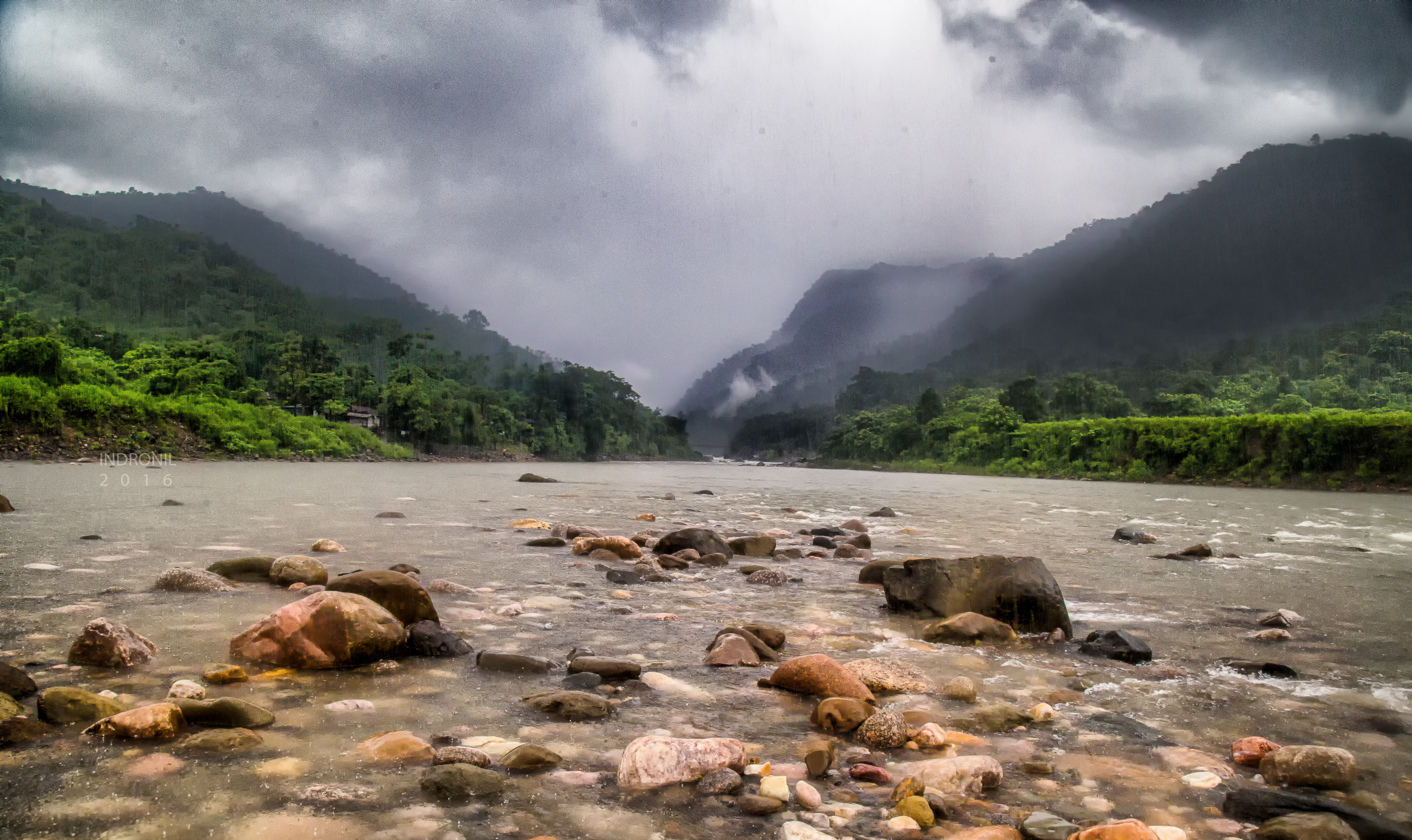
- Bichnakandi, Gowainghat
- Nickname: Bisnakhandi
- Interactive map of Bichhanakandi
- Country: Bangladesh
- Division: Sylhet
- District: Sylhet
- Upazila: Gowainghat
- Union Parishad: Bisnakandi Union
- Facebook: Bisnakandi Photography

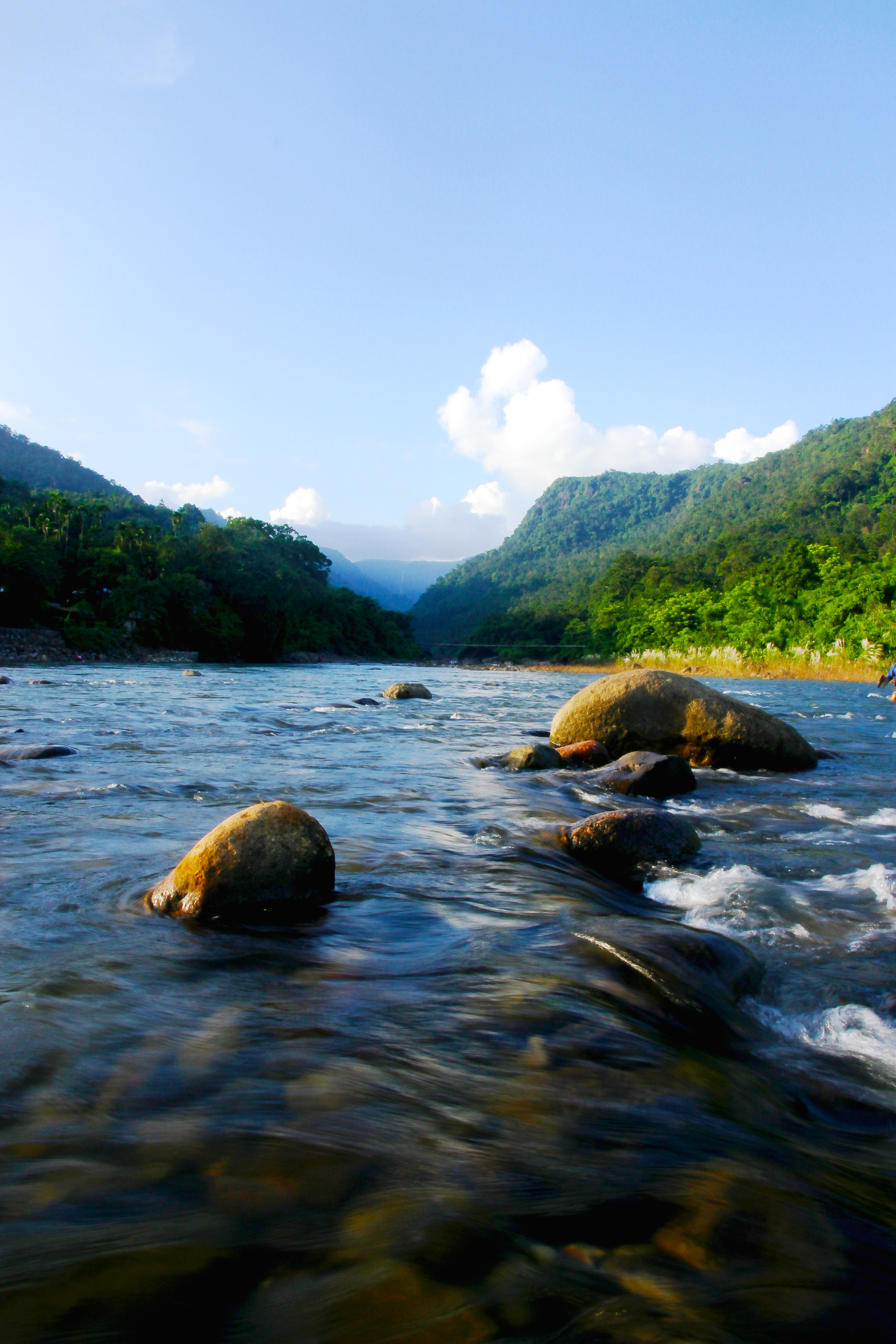
Bichnakandi

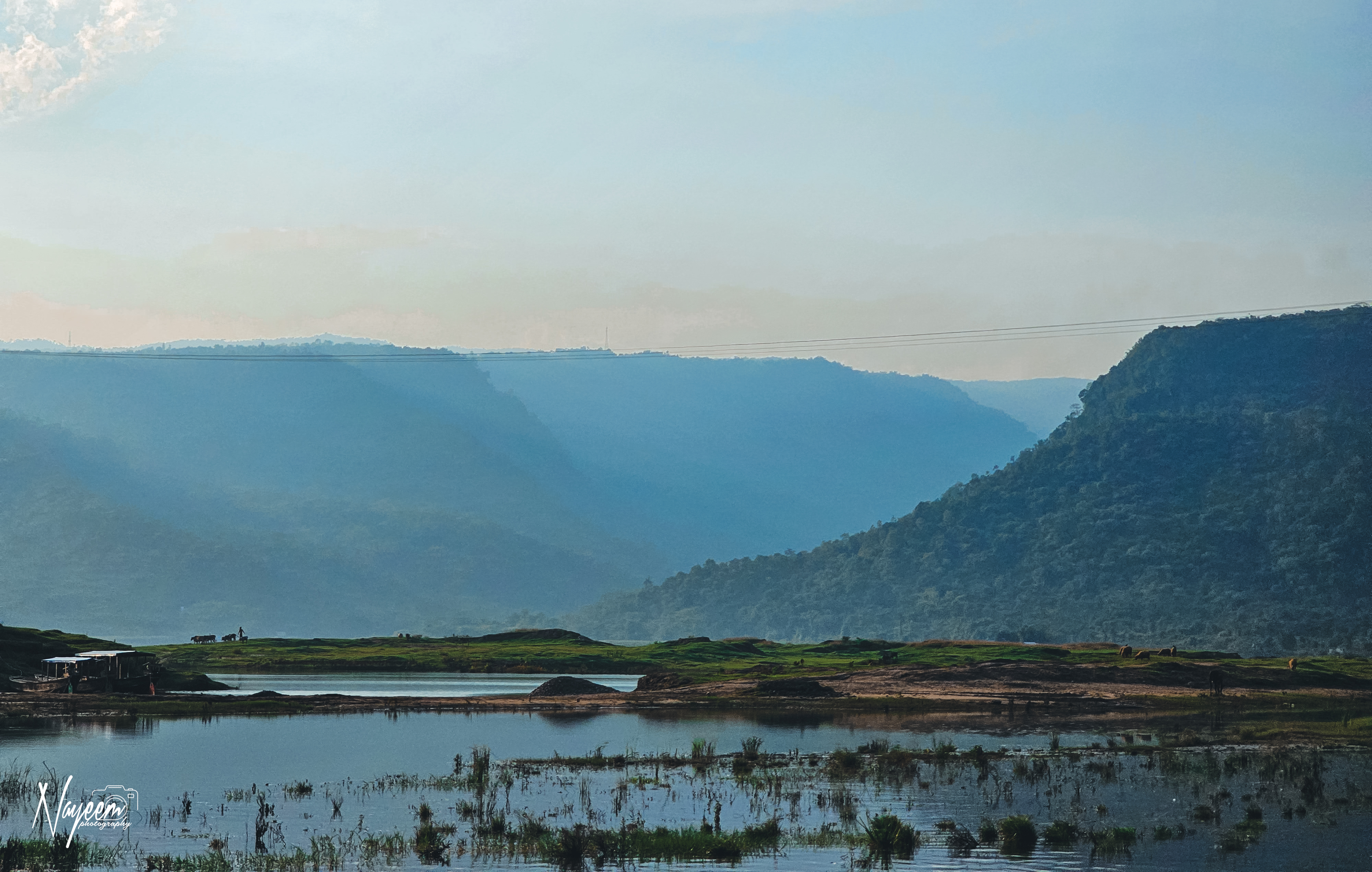
Landscape of Bichnakandi

Bichnakandi (Bengali: বিছানাকান্দি, romanized: Bichhanakandi), also known as Bisnakandi, is a village in Rustompur Union, Gowainghat Upazila of Bangladesh's Sylhet District. In recent years, there has been an influx of tourists to its river.

== Etymology ==
Bichnakandi is made up of two words in the Bengali language: Bichhana (or Bisna in Sylheti) meaning bed and kandi meaning a dam or cluster. The abundance of stones piled on top of each other like a bed gives this name.

== Geology ==
Bichnakandi is a quarry spot that is used to collect rocks from the riverbed. It is the place where many layers of the Khasi mountains from both sides meet at one point. Fountains from the Khasi Hills make a lake that is connected to Piyain River. The rocks are also natural and come down with water streams from the mountains. It is one of the most visited tourist spots in Bangladesh. This place is alongside the Bangladesh-India border and has two tectonic plates on the verge of colliding. Geologist have also proved that these kinds of places in Earth have a high rate of earthquakes; the same can be said for Jaflong, Lalakhal, and Manipur.

== Gallery ==
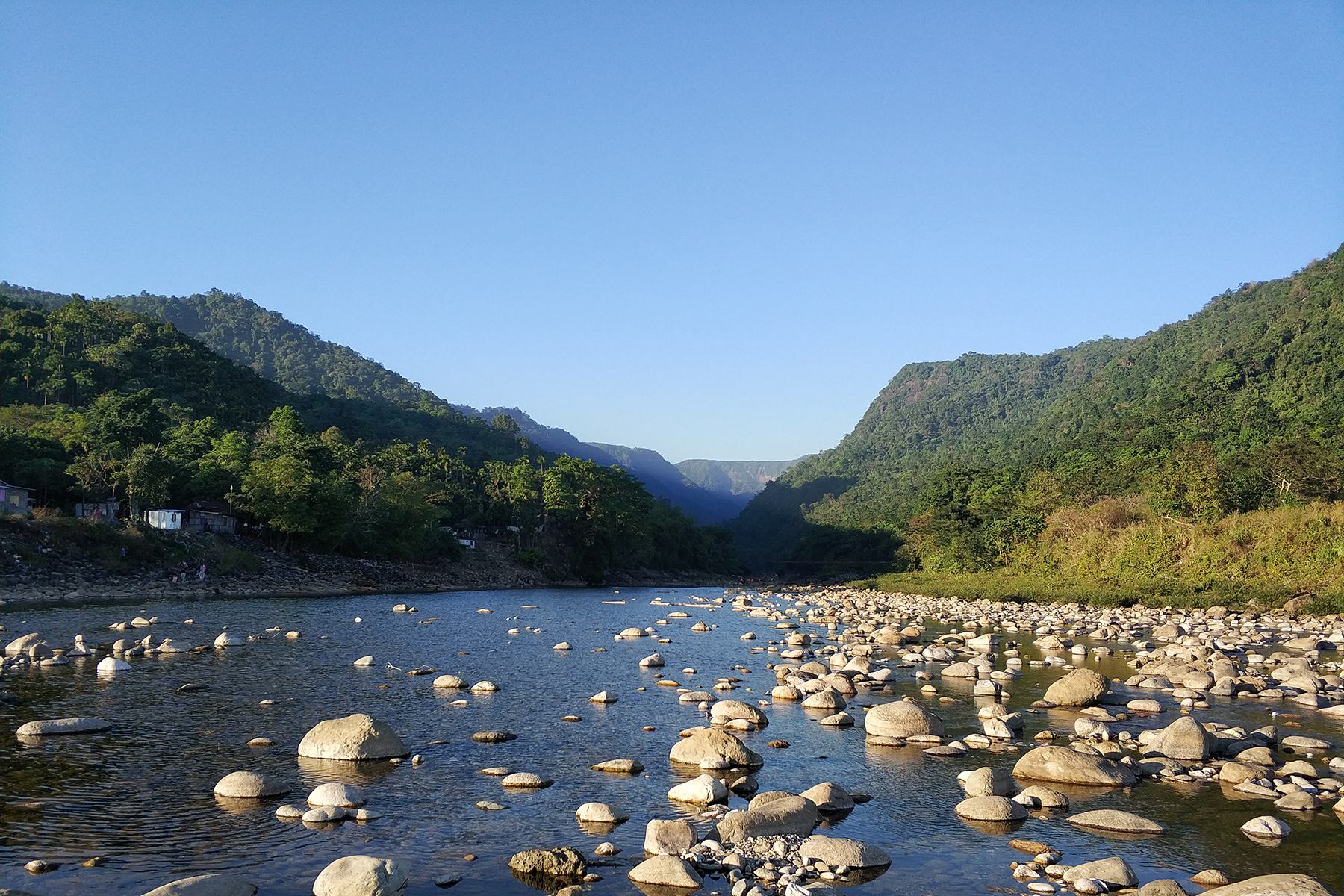

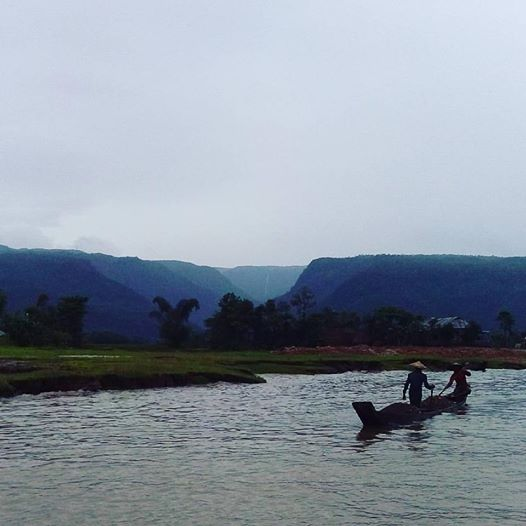
