= Imran Ahmad =

Bangladeshi politician

- ইমরান আহমেদ
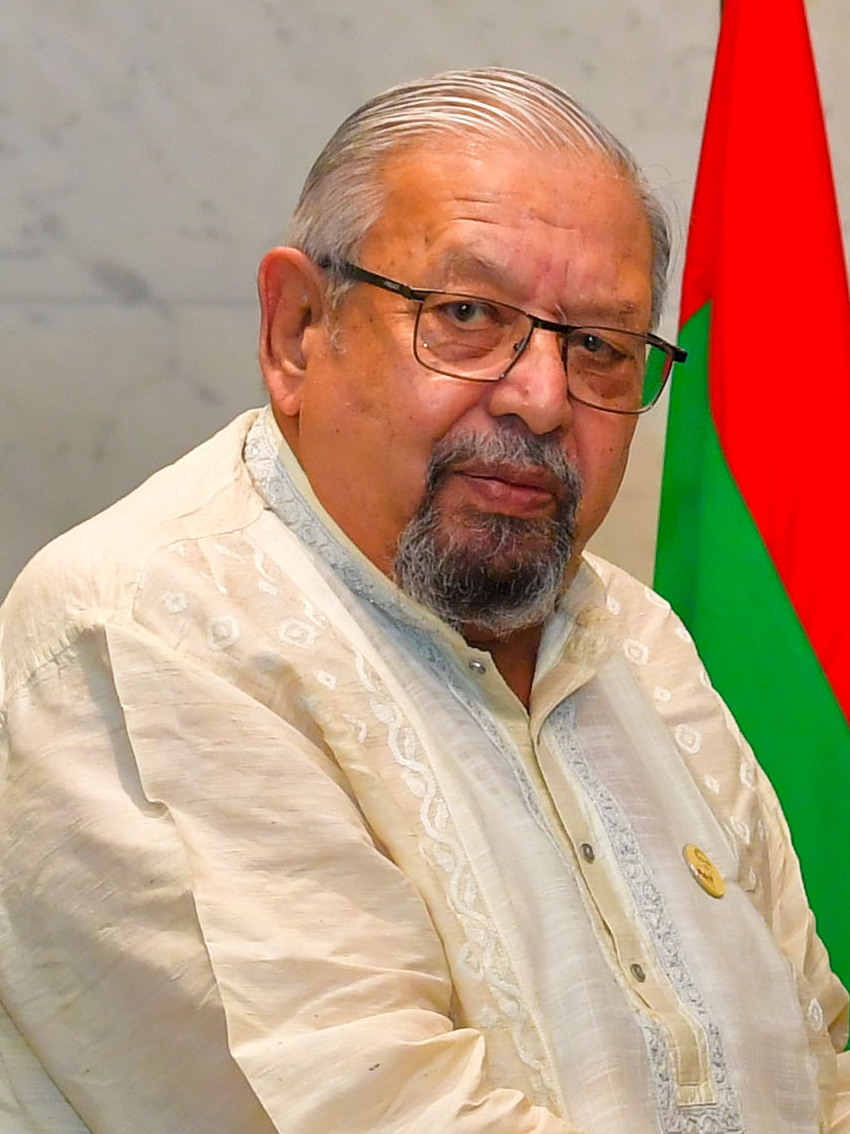
- Ahmad in 2021

Member of the Bangladesh Parliament for Sylhet-4
- In office 25 January 2009 – 6 August 2024
- Preceded by: Dildar Hossain Selim
- In office 14 July 1996 – 13 July 2001
- Preceded by: Saifur Rahman
- In office 5 March 1991 – 24 November 1995
- Preceded by: Abdul Hannan
- In office 10 July 1986 – 6 December 1987
- Preceded by: Iqbal Hossain Chowdhury

Minister of Expatriates' Welfare and Overseas Employment
- In office 13 July 2019 – 10 January 2024
- Prime Minister: Sheikh Hasina
- Preceded by: Nurul Islam

Personal details
- Born: 22 February 1948 (age 78) Demra, East Bengal, Dominion of Pakistan
- Party: Bangladesh Awami League
- Parents: Harun Sheikh (father); Mst. Yanur Begum (mother)
- Education: B.A.(Hons), University of Dhaka

Imran Ahmad (born 22 Feb 1948) is a Bangladesh Awami League politician, businessman and a former Minister of Expatriates' Welfare and Overseas Employment during 2019–2024. He is a former member of Jatiya Sangsad representing the Sylhet-4 constituency for six terms.

== Early life and education ==
Imran was born in Demra in East Bengal, in the Dominion of Pakistan to Harun Sheikh and Mst. Yanur Begum. Their ancestral home was in Manirampur Upazila, Jessore. He completed his SSC education at the Bawany High School in Demra and finished his upper education. He graduated from the University of Dhaka with a Bachelor of Arts in geography.

== Career ==
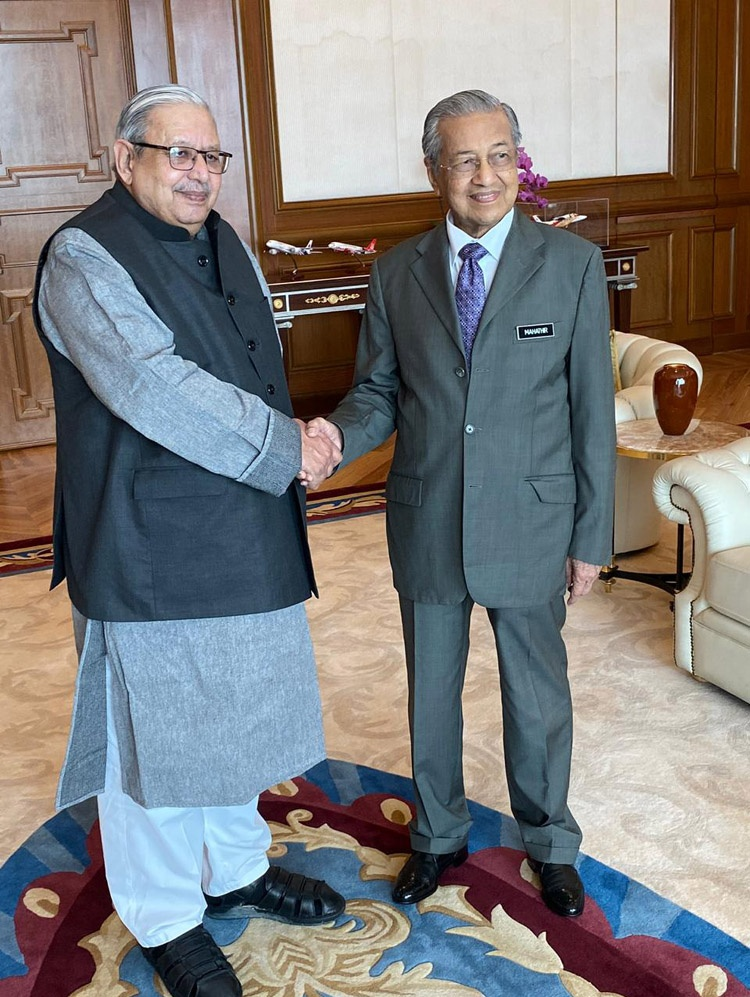
Imran with Malaysian Prime Minister Mahathir Mohamad on 7 November 2019

Imran was elected as a member to Jatiya Sangsad representing the Sylhet-4 constituency in 1983 as a candidate of Bangladesh Awami League. He was re-elected to the position in 1991, 1996, 2008, 2014, 2018, and 2024.

On 21 October 2024, Ahmad was arrested by the Detective Branch of Dhaka Metropolitan Police in the Banani area in Dhaka. Earlier on 3 September, a lawsuit was filed against him at Paltan Police Station on charges of embezzlement and human trafficking.

== Personal life ==
Imran's son is the musician Buno. Buno was married to Anusheh Anadil, daughter of Kazi Nuruzzaman.
