= Companiganj Upazila, Sylhet =

Companyganj কোম্পানীগঞ্জ
- Upazila
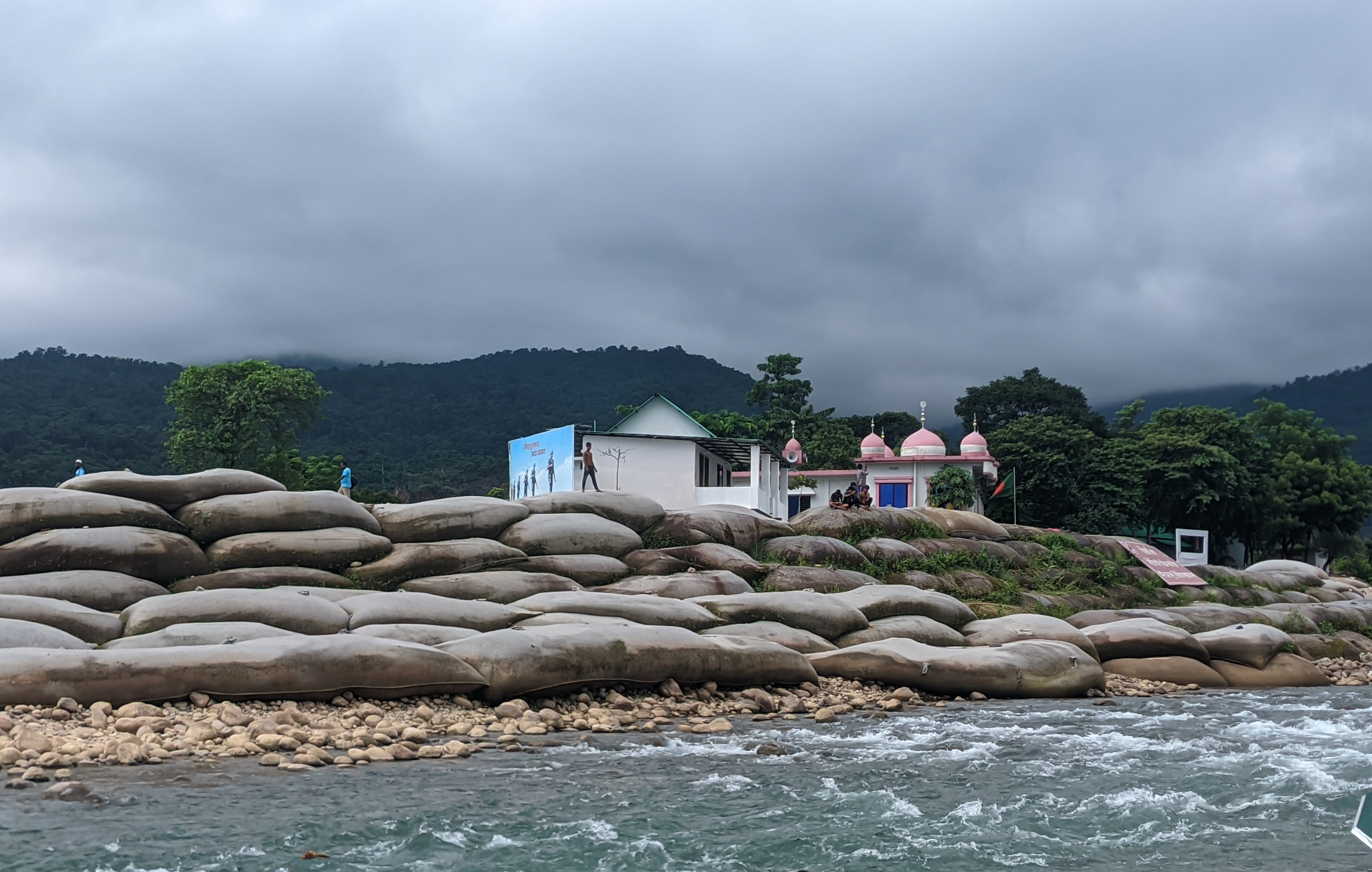
- Sada Pathor in Bholaganj, Companiganj upazila

- Country: Bangladesh
- Division: Sylhet
- District: Sylhet

Area
  - Total: 296.75 km^{2} (114.58 sq mi)

Population (2022)
  - Total: 192,350
  - Density: 648.19/km^{2} (1,678.8/sq mi)
- Demonym(s): Companiganji, Compenigonji, Kompenigoinji
- Time zone: UTC+6 (BST)
- Postal code: 3140
- Area code: 08225

Companyganj (Bengali: কোম্পানীগঞ্জ) is an upazila of Sylhet District in the Division of Sylhet, Bangladesh.

== History ==
In 1779, the Khasi people attacked merchants in the village of Pandua in Bholaganj, who were going towards Calcutta after they experienced abuse from Europeans. Many merchants pleaded Robert Lindsay, the Collector of Sylhet, to build a small brick fort to protect them from further attacks from the Khasi.

In 1789, the Collector of Sylhet, John Willes, stationed many sepoys in Pandua. The Khasi however, continued their attacks, killing the thanadar and many sepoys. Two European merchants managed to escape and inform Willes of the incident, who passed it on to the Government at Calcutta. A force was then sent from there to the village of Pandua, although it led to a bloodless end. Willes also told the government that he really had little control over northern Sylhet as the Khasi chiefs refused every order, would behead the messenger and then continue raiding Sylheti villages as they had done even during the Mughal Empire period. Another Khasi raid took place in 1795 and many years went after that with the Khasis remaining in their hills and not troubling the plains.

In 1976, the Companiganj Thana was established based in the village of Burdeo in the banks of the Dhalai River. It consisted of the current Companiganj Upazila but also included Islampur Union (Chhatak), Jalalabad Union (Sylhet Sadar) as well as Rustampur & Towakul Unions (Gowainghat). The reason for the creation of a thana was because there were no main roads leading to the town and the only access was through rivers during the rainy season. The East India Company had a strong presence in the business sector in this area and thus it was named Companiganj.

During the Bangladesh Liberation War of 1971, Companiganj was part of the Bholaganj sub-sector in Sector 5 under the charge of Lieutenant Taheruddin Akhunji. 19 freedom fighters were killed in this area. It was made an upazila on 11 November 1982 by the President of Bangladesh, H M Ershad, as a part of his decentralisation programme.

== Geography ==
Companiganj Upazila (Sylhet district) area 278.55 square kilometres (107.55 sq mi), located in between 24°58' and 25°11' north latitudes and in between 91°41' and 91°53' east longitudes. It is bounded by Meghalaya (state of India) on the north, Sylhet Sadar, Gowainghat and Chhatak upazilas on the south, Gowainghat upazila on the east and Chhatak upazila on the west. Companiganj is home to Bangladesh's largest quarry, the Bholaganj stone quarry. The area is a significant center of stone mining and trading activities, contributing significantly to the local economy.

Water bodies Main rivers: Surma and Piyain; noted boars: Baowa, Lali, Loba, Poko; noted beels: Panichhapara, Nigar, Rauti and Kalenga.

== Demographics ==
Religions in Companiganj Upazila (2022)
| Religion | Percent |
| Islam | 93.72% |
| Hinduism | 6.25% |
| Other or not stated | 0.03% |

According to the 2022 Bangladeshi census, Companiganj Upazila had 34,848 households and a population of 192,350. 14.37% of the population were under 5 years of age. Companiganj had a literacy rate (age 7 and over) of 61.33%: 62.17% for males and 60.52% for females, and a sex ratio of 98.06 males for every 100 females. 57,766 (30.03%) lived in urban areas.

According to the 2011 Census of Bangladesh, Companiganj Upazila had 28,756 households and a population of 174,029. 59,927 (34.44%) were under 10 years of age. Companiganj had a literacy rate (age 7 and over) of 28.77%, compared to the national average of 51.8%, and a sex ratio of 941 females per 1000 males. 18,035 (10.36%) lived in urban areas. Ethnic population was 1,468 (0.84%), of which Manipuri were 507.

In 2001, the population was 113,784, male 59,758, female 54,026, Muslim 104,200, Hindu 9,522, and others 62. Indigenous communities such as Khasia, Manipuri belong to this upazila.

== Administration ==
Companiganj Upazila is divided into six union parishads: Islampur Paschim, Islampur Purba, Isakalas, Ranikhai Dakshin, Ranikhai Uttar, and Telikhal. The union parishads are subdivided into 76 mauzas and 131 villages.

== See also ==
- Upazilas of Bangladesh
- Bholaganj
