= Dildar Hossain Selim =

Bangladeshi politician (1950–2021)

Member of Parliament for Sylhet-4
- In office 1 October 2001 – 26 October 2006
- Preceded by: Imran Ahmad
- Succeeded by: Imran Ahmad

Personal details
- Born: 13 November 1950 Sylhet
- Died: 5 May 2021 (aged 70) Sylhet
- Party: Bangladesh Nationalist Party
- Spouse: Zebunnnahar Selim
- Children: two daughters and a son.
- Parent(s): Idris Ali Chowdhury; Akhlaqun Nesha
- Education: Murari Chand College

Dildar Hossain Selim (13 November 1950 – 5 May 2021) was a Bangladesh Nationalist Party politician who served as Jatiya Sangsad member from Sylhet-4.

== Early life ==
Dildar Hossain Selim was born on 13 November 1950 in the village of Radhanagar in Gowainghat Upazila of Sylhet. His father Idris Ali Chowdhury was a doctor and his mother Akhlaqun Nesha was a housewife. Selim's grandfather's house is in Bishwanath Kamil Nagar Deokals Union. His father started his career in Jaflong Tea Garden Hospital in the service of the British government and settled in Radhanagar.

His wife Jebunnahar Selim is a lawyer. He is the father of two daughters and a son. The children live in America. His youngest daughter is a US Attorney and a UK Barrister. He and his wife lived in Lama Bazar area of Sylhet.

== Career ==
Selim was involved in left politics at the beginning of his political career. He was the Central Co-Organizing Secretary of the Bangladesh Nationalist Party. He was GS and VP of MC College Students' Union. He also served as the General Secretary of the Sylhet District Sports Association.

He was elected to parliament in 2001 from Sylhet-4 as a candidate of Bangladesh Nationalist Party. He also lost the 2008 and 2018 elections by participating from the BNP. He did not participate in the party decision in the 2014 elections.

He was first elected as the chairman of Gowainghat Upazila Parishad. On 15 September 2004 he asked Home Minister Lutfozzaman Babar to take action against the opposition Awami League.

== Death ==
Selim died on 5 May 2021.
