= Gowainghat Upazila =

Gowainghat গোয়াইনঘাট
- Upazila
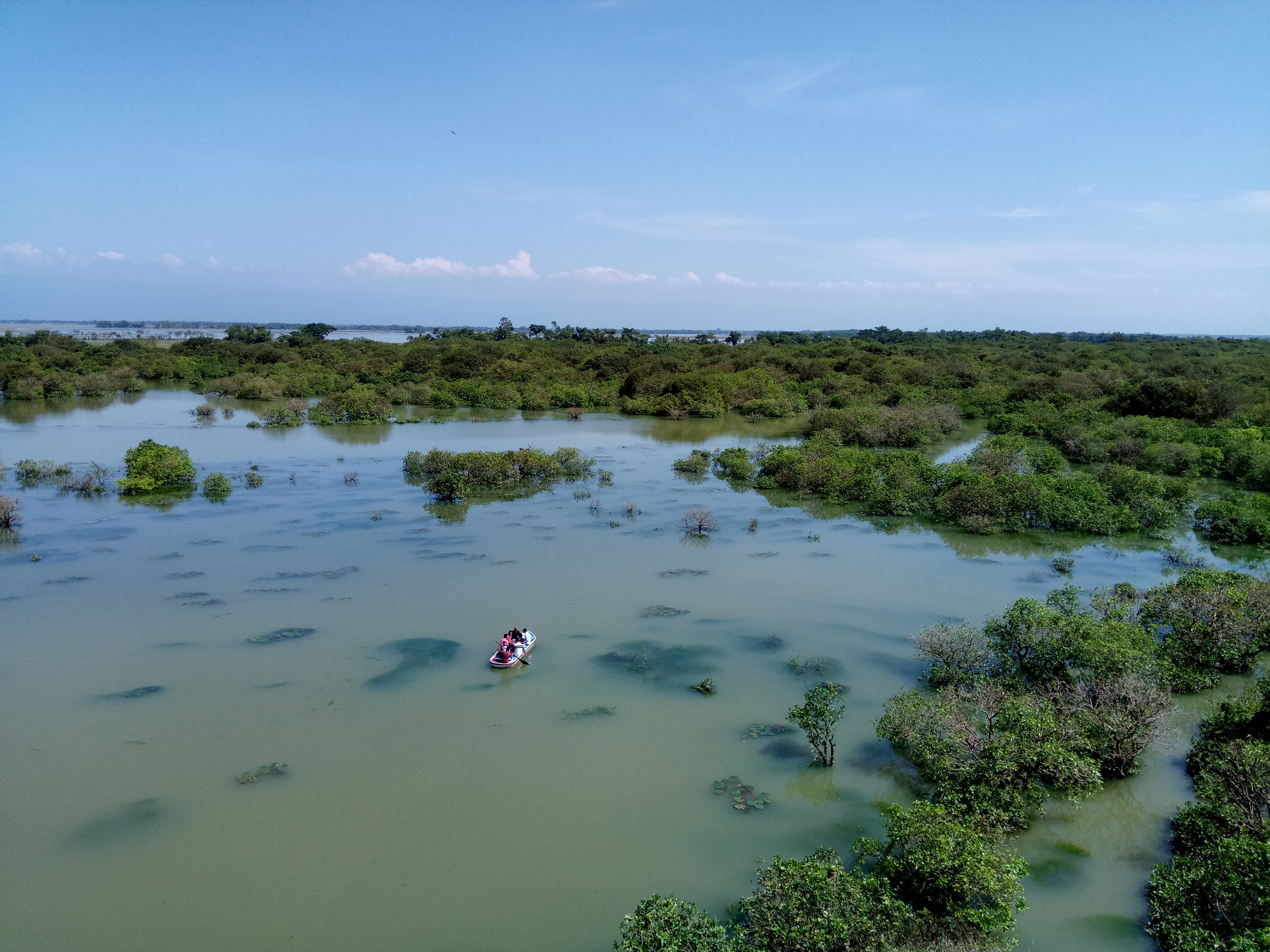
- View of Ratargul Swamp Forest

- Coordinates: 25°6.2′N 91°53.5′E
- Country: Bangladesh
- Division: Sylhet
- District: Sylhet

Area
  - Total: 481.12 km^{2} (185.76 sq mi)

Population (2022)
  - Total: 355,979
  - Density: 739.90/km^{2} (1,916.3/sq mi)
- Time zone: UTC+6 (BST)
- Postal code: 3150
- Website: gowainghat.sylhet.gov.bd

Gowainghat Upazila mauza geocode map

Gowainghat (Bengali: গোয়াইনঘাট) is an upazila of Sylhet District in the Division of Sylhet, Bangladesh.

== History ==
The British Empire conquered the Jaintia Kingdom on 25 March 1835, finally incorporating Gowainghat in its Sylhet District Collectorate. In 1908, the Gowainghat Thana was founded with the union of 5 parganas; Dhargram, Araikha, Piyaingul, Panchbhag and Jaflong and then separated into 12 union councils. During the Bangladesh Liberation War, the Pakistani army launched an attack in Ujuhat, Alirgaon killing 25 freedom fighters on the night of 28 November 1971. 7 mass graves are found in the upazila in Ujuhat, Atgram, Tamabil Zero Point, Health Complex and Birkuli. To commemorate the loss of lives, a memorial has been built. The thana prospered, officially upgrading to an upazila on 14 March 1983.

== Geography ==
Gowainghat is located at 25.1028°N 91.8917°E. It has 47,992 households and a total area of 481.12 km^{2}. The rivers are quarried for their stones, in areas like Jaflong and Bichnakandi.

== Demographics ==
Religions in Gowainghat Upazila (2022)
Religion	Percent
Islam	93.30%
Hinduism	6.40%
Other or not stated	0.30%

According to the 2022 Bangladeshi census, Gowainghat Upazila had 66,187 households and a population of 355,979. 13.33% of the population were under 5 years of age. Gowainghat had a literacy rate (age 7 and over) of 65.90%: 67.83% for males and 64.05% for females, and a sex ratio of 97.82 males for every 100 females. 9,463 (2.66%) lived in urban areas. Ethnic population is 4533 (1.27%).

According to the 2011 Census of Bangladesh, Gowainghat Upazila had 47,992 households and a population of 287,512. 93,235 (32.43%) were under 10 years of age. Gowainghat had a literacy rate (age 7 and over) of 32.70%, compared to the national average of 51.8%, and a sex ratio of 998 females per 1000 males. 6,069 (2.11%) lived in urban areas. Ethnic population was 2,073 (0.72%), of which Khasi were 902.

As of 2001 Bangladesh census, Gowainghat has a population of 207,170. Males constituted 51.80% of the population, and females 48.20%. Gowainghat has an average literacy rate of 22.8%.

== Administration ==
Gowainghat Upazila is divided into twelve union parishads: Alirgaon, Bisanakandi Daubaria, Fatehpur, Lengura, Gowainghat Sadar, Nandirgaon, Madya Jaflong, Purba Jaflong, Paschim Jaflong, Rustampur, and Towakul. The union parishads are subdivided into 231 mauzas and 266 villages.

== Notable people ==
- Saiful Alom, former member of the East Bengal Legislative Assembly
- Abdul Hannan, former parliamentarian
- Faizul Hasan, former member of the East Bengal Legislative Assembly
- Dildar Hossain Selim, politician

== See also ==
- Upazilas of Bangladesh
- Districts of Bangladesh
- Divisions of Bangladesh
