= Abdul Hannan (politician) =

Bangladeshi politician

- আব্দুল হান্নান

Member of Parliament for Sylhet-4
- In office 1988–1990
- Preceded by: Imran Ahmad
- Succeeded by: Imran Ahmad

Personal details
- Born: 1 January 1938 Sylhet District
- Died: 1 October 2009 (aged 71)
- Party: Awami League

Abdul Hannan (1 January 1938 – 1 October 2009) was a politician of Sylhet district of Bangladesh and former member of parliament for the Sylhet-4 constituency in 1988.

== Birth and early life ==
M.A. Hannan was born on 1 January 1938 in the village of Birkuli in Gowainghat upazila of Sylhet district (now Bangladesh) in Assam, British India. He completed his primary education in his village and passed matriculation from Gowainghat High School in 1952. He passed HSC from MC College in 1954 and BA degree in 1958. After that he was admitted to Dhaka University in 1958 in LLB.

== Political life ==
Abdul Hannan made a significant contribution to the language movement in 1952. He was the founding president of Gowainghat Awami League. He took active part in the liberation war of Bangladesh. He was elected chairman of Tokul Union No. 8 of Gowainghat Upazila three times in a row from 1973 to 1983.

He was elected to parliament from Sylhet-4 as an independent candidate in 1988.

== Death ==
Abdul Hannan died on 1 October 2009.
