= Jaflong =

Coordinates: 25.163383°N 92.017524°E

Jaflong জাফলং
- Hill station
- Interactive map of Jaflong

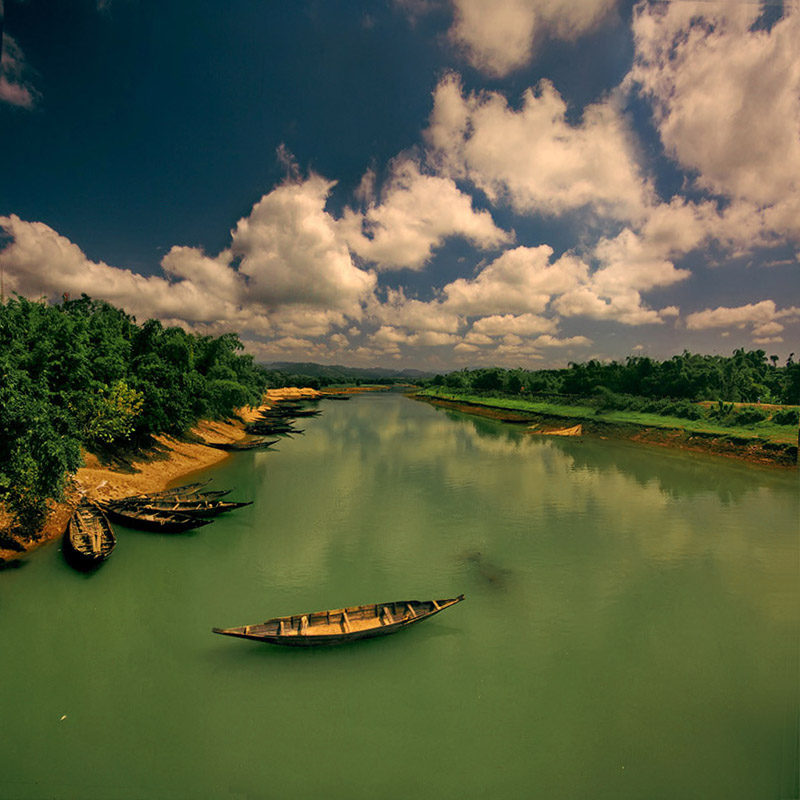
Jaflong attracts tourists for its natural environment

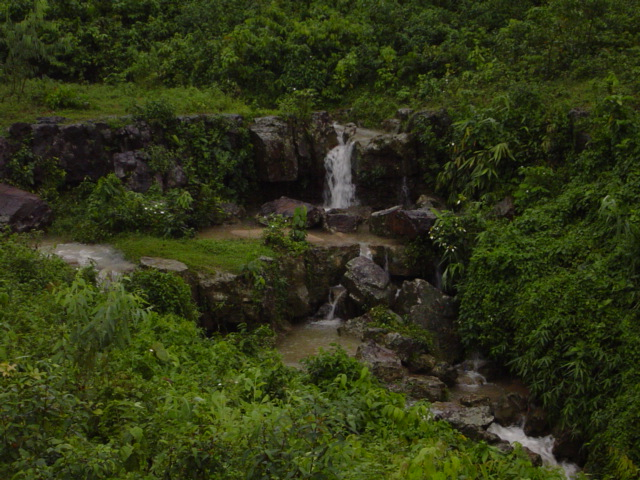
Aakhta Fall, Jaflong

Jaflong (Bengali: জাফলং) is a hill station and tourist destination in the Division of Sylhet, Bangladesh. It is located in Gowainghat Upazila of Sylhet District and is situated at the border between Bangladesh and the Indian state of Meghalaya, overshadowed by subtropical mountains and rainforests. It is known for its stone collections and is home of the Khasi tribe.

== Introduction ==
Jaflong is a tourist spot in Sylhet division. It is about 60 km from Sylhet town and takes around a two hours drive to reach there. Jaflong is located amidst tea gardens and hills. It is situated beside the river Sari in the lap of Hill Khashia.

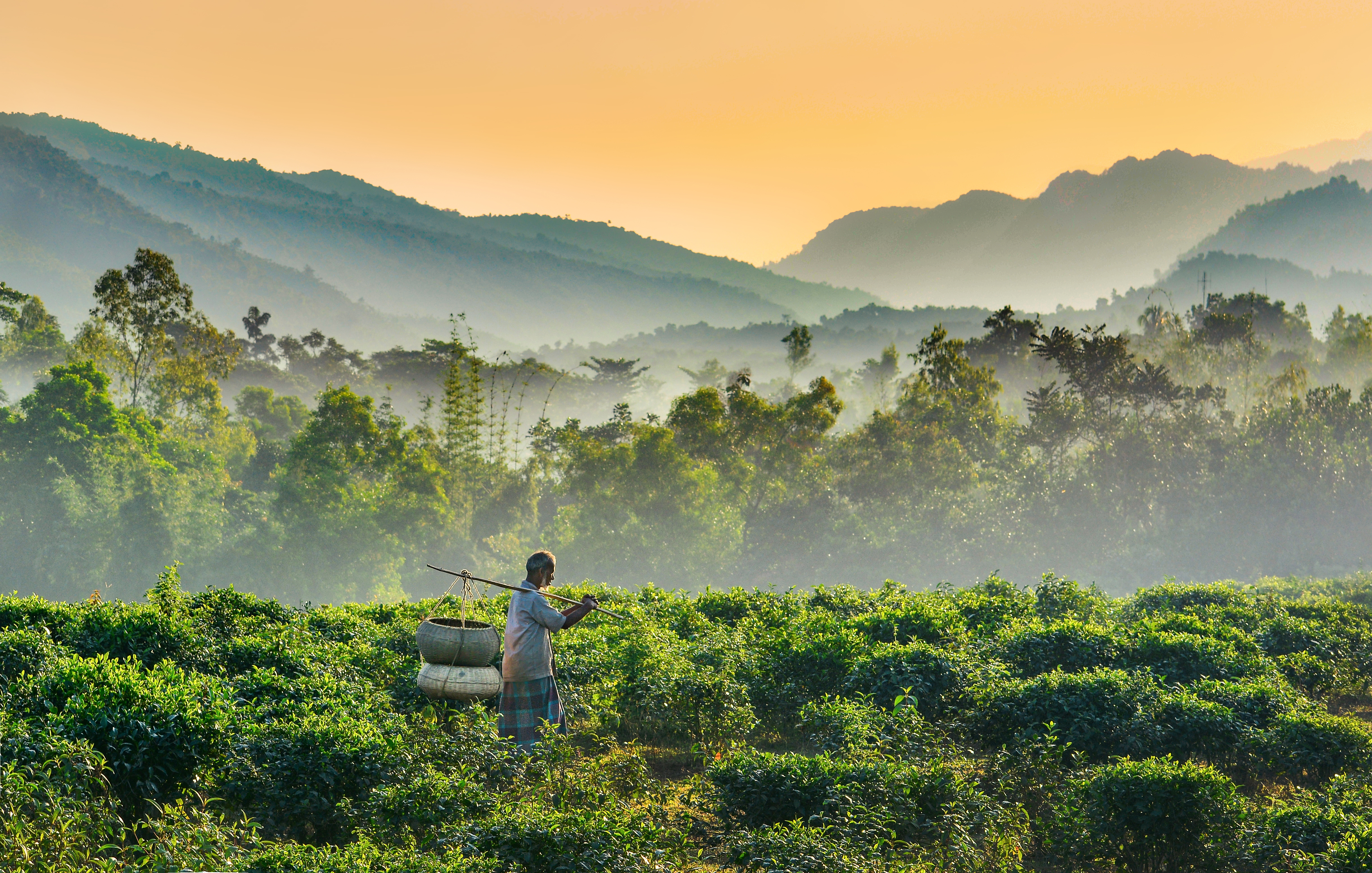
Tea Garden, Jaflong Sylhet

== Attractions ==
- Collection of rolling stones
- Colorful tribal life
- Dawki and Piyain Rivers
- Tea Garden
- Orange and Jackfruit gardens
- Betel leaf and areca nut gardens
- Dawki Bazar

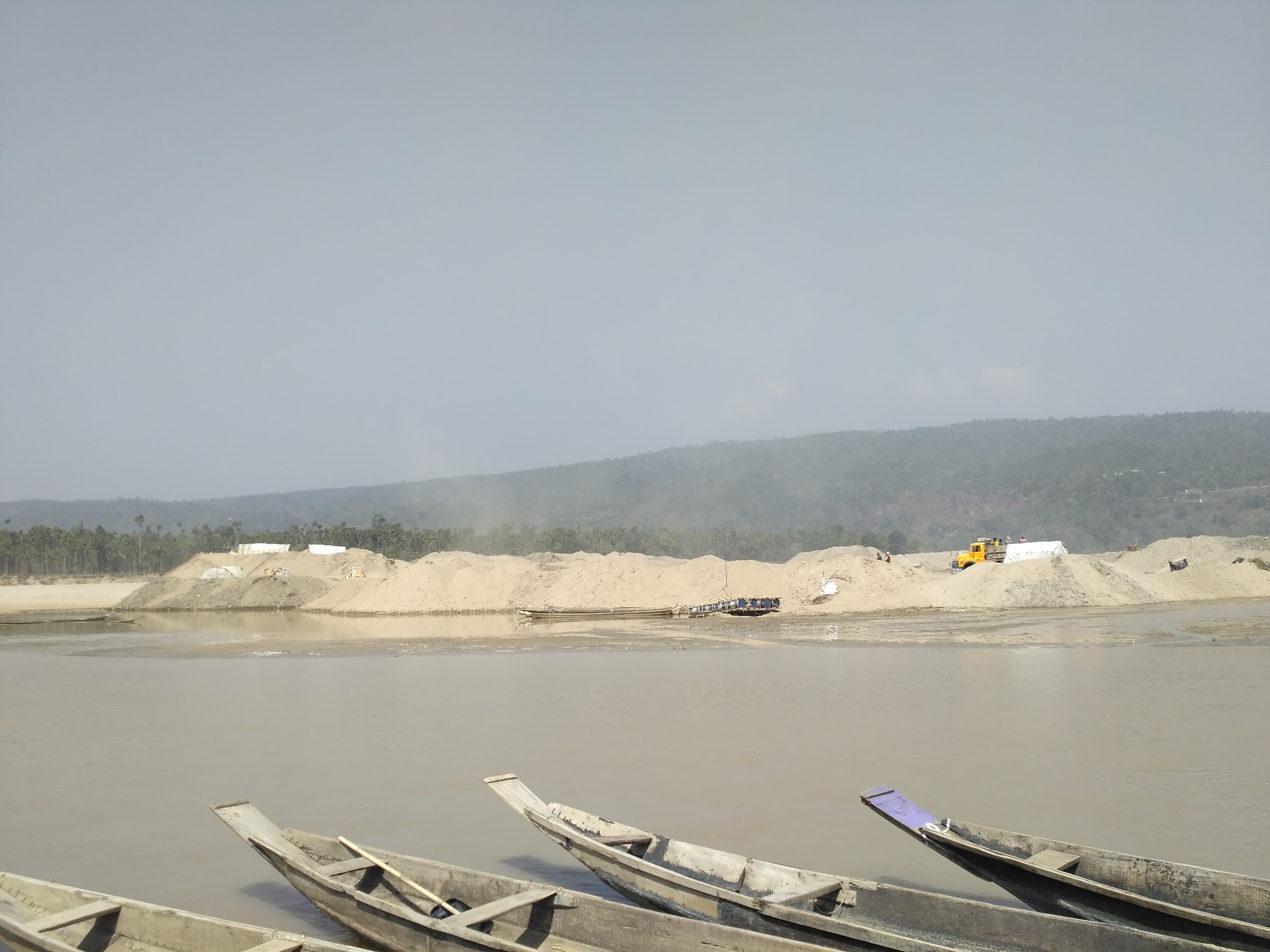
A river in Jaflong

== Stone crushing ==
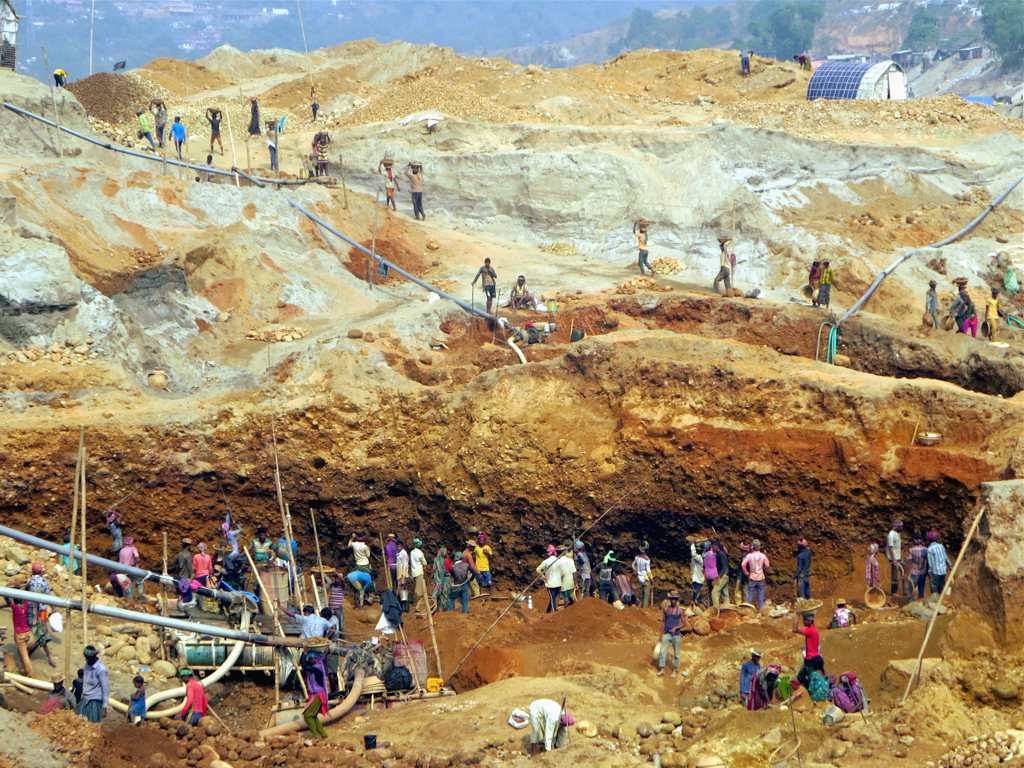
Stone extraction from the bed of the Goyain River at Jaflong

The land grabbers occupied government Khasiland and reserved forestland and extracted stone by cutting small hills polluting the environment of Jaflong. They also established crushing mills on the forestland without permission from the government.

== Forestation program ==
In early 2005, Laskar Muqsudur Rahman, Deputy Conservator of Forests of the Sylhet Forest Division, stated that in Jaflong during his childhood, the 'lungs' of Greater Sylhet were at stake due to ongoing encroachments and establishments of unauthorized stone crushing mills. He took initiatives to recover the land and establish a recreation-cum-botanical park named as 'Jaflong Green Park'. The first foundation stone for the thematic Green Park at Jaflong was laid by Laskar Muqsudur Rahman, Deputy Conservator of Forests in 2005 with the cooperation of local forest staffs led by Forest Ranger Mohammad Ali. Nonetheless, at the inception it was a challenging task due to local conflicts and procedural constraints. The forestation program in Jaflong Green Park has been started under supervision of the joint forces, Jaflong Foundation and Forest Department. They have jointly taken up the forestation program with about 100 hectares of grabbed land. Under the forestation program, various types of trees, including hybrid Akash-moni, are being planted in the park to maintain ecological balance.

== See also ==
- Jaintia Rajbari
