= Lalakhal =

Tourist spot in Sylhet district

- Place
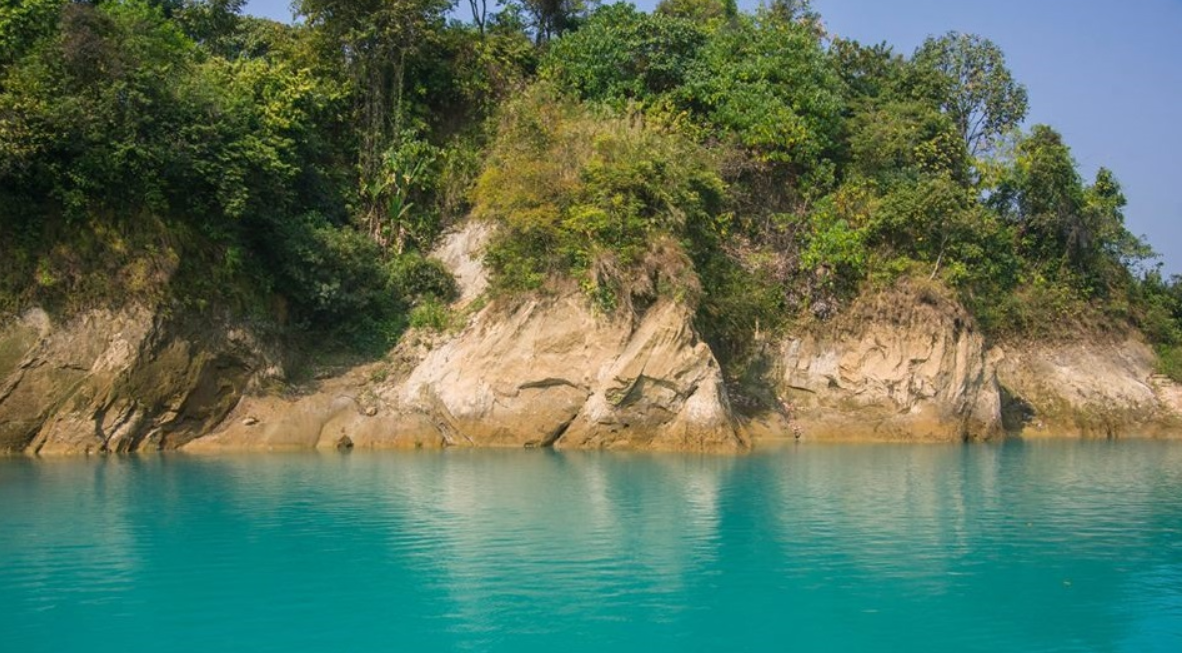

- Location within Bangladesh
- Coordinates: 25.1068°N 92.1790°E
- Country: Bangladesh
- Division: Sylhet Division
- District: Sylhet District
- Upazila: Jaintiapur Upazila

Area
  - Total: 4 km^{2} (1.5 sq mi)
- Time zone: UTC+6 (BST)

Lalakhal (Bengali: লালাখাল) is a tourist spot in Jaintiapur, Sylhet District, Bangladesh. The place is known for its beautiful bluish water.

Lalakhal is a wide channel in the Sharee River near the Tamabil road. The river is not very deep but one of the major sources of sand in Sylhet. The main attraction of the river is the variety of colours of the water, which varies from green to turquoise to clear at different points. The water of the river has a turquoise hue due to the limestone deposits in the river. Excessive mineral and sand harvesting in the recent years has put the river at a risk of degradation.

== See also ==
- Ratargul Swamp Forest
