= Piyain River =

Coordinates: 24°46′N 91°06′E

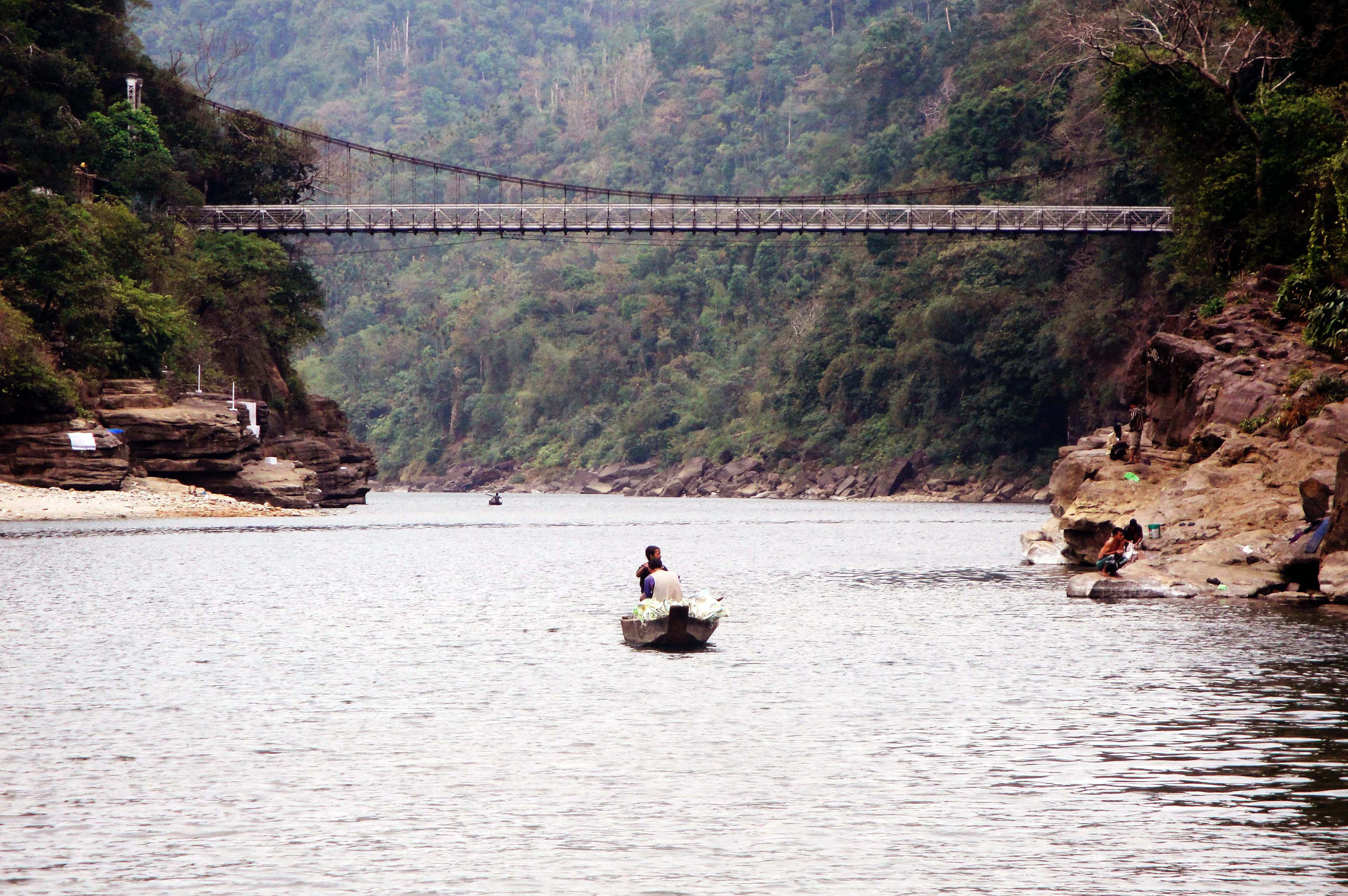
- Piyain River in Zero Point Jaflong, Sylhet

Location
- Countries: India, Bangladesh
- District: Sylhet

Physical characteristics
- Source
  - location: Umgat river of Assam
- Mouth
  - location: Surma River
- Length: 145 km (90 mi)

Piyain River a trans-boundary river of India and Bangladesh. It is a tributary of the Surma river, which originates from the Umngot River in Meghalaya. The river enters Bangladesh through Sylhet district.

The Piyain River, once large and flowing, has been left mostly dry due to floods in the 1980s, unregulated stone quarrying, and illegal sand extraction.

== Course ==
The length of the river is 145 km.

Originating from the Umngot, the river enters Bangladesh through the Jaflong area of Gowainghat, where it divides into two parts.

== Gallery ==
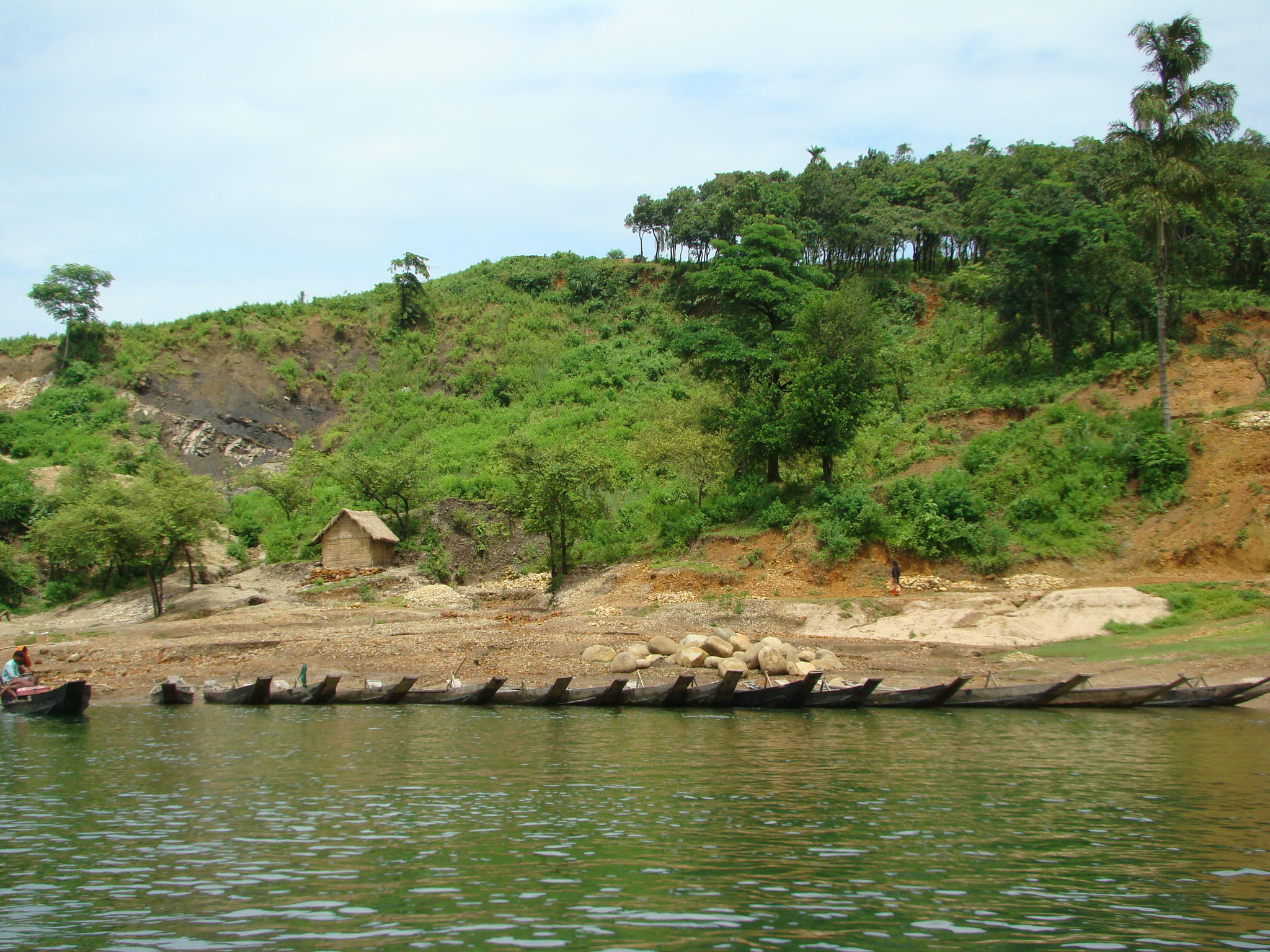

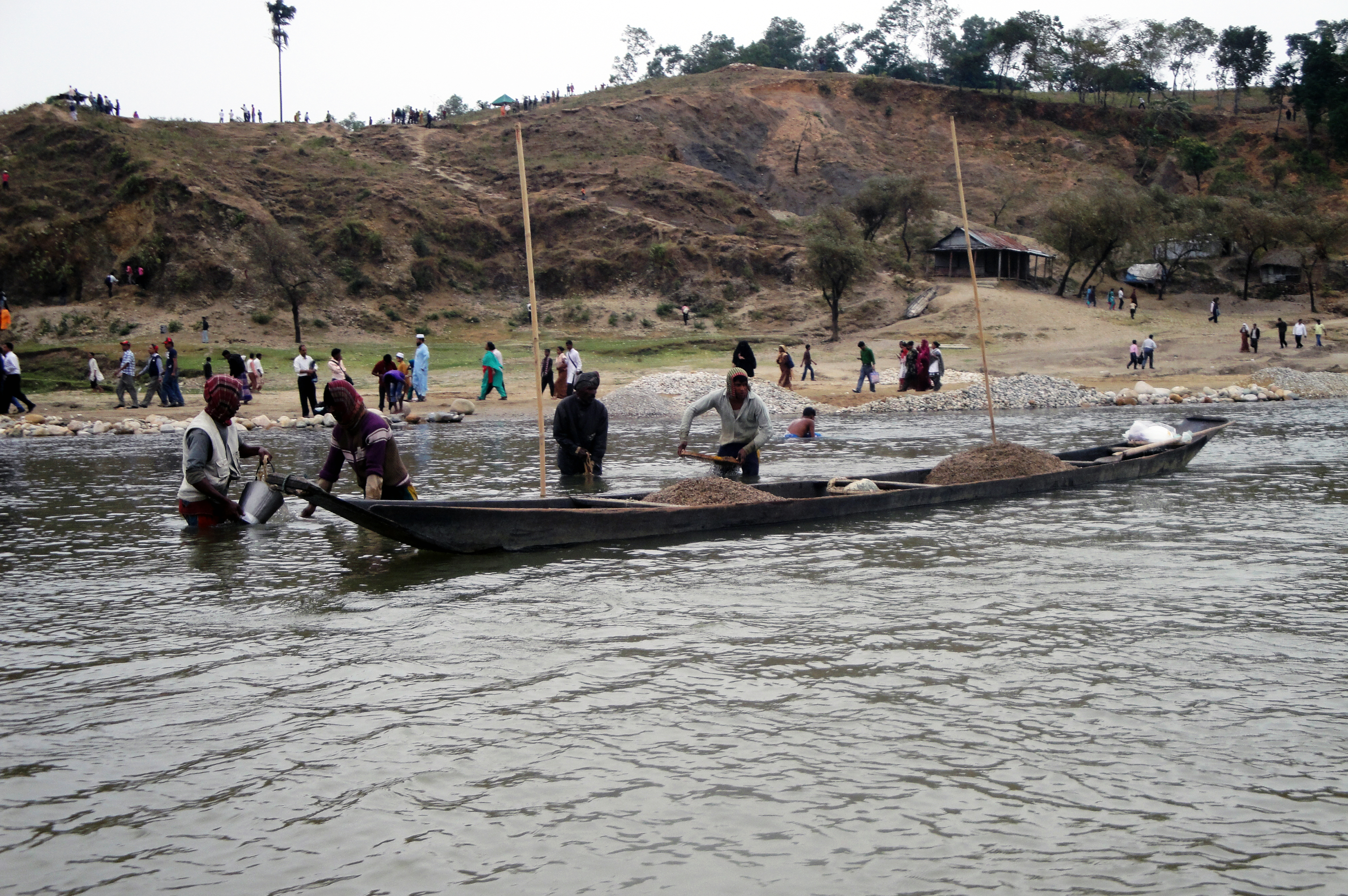

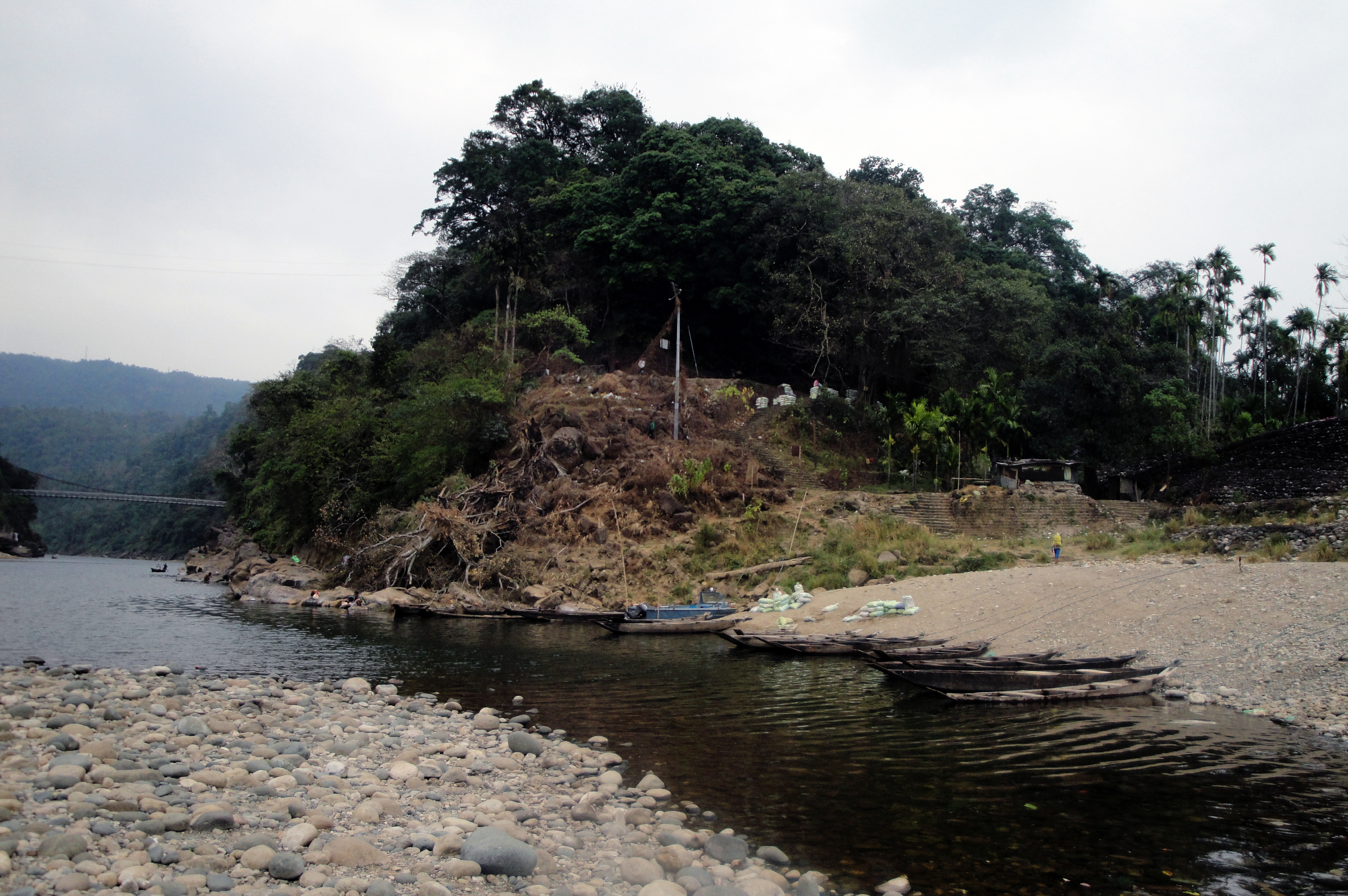

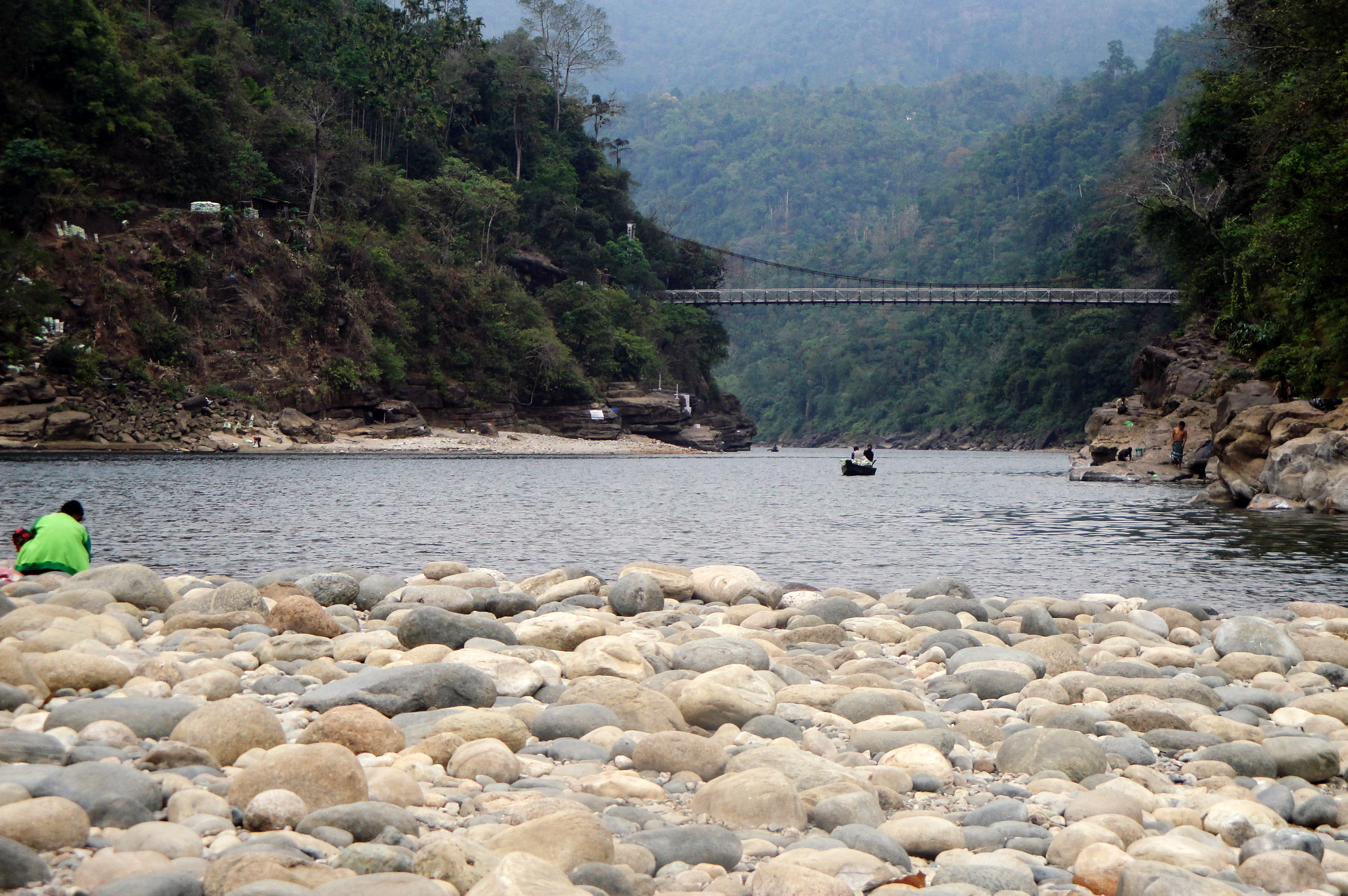
Piyain River at Zero Point Jaflong

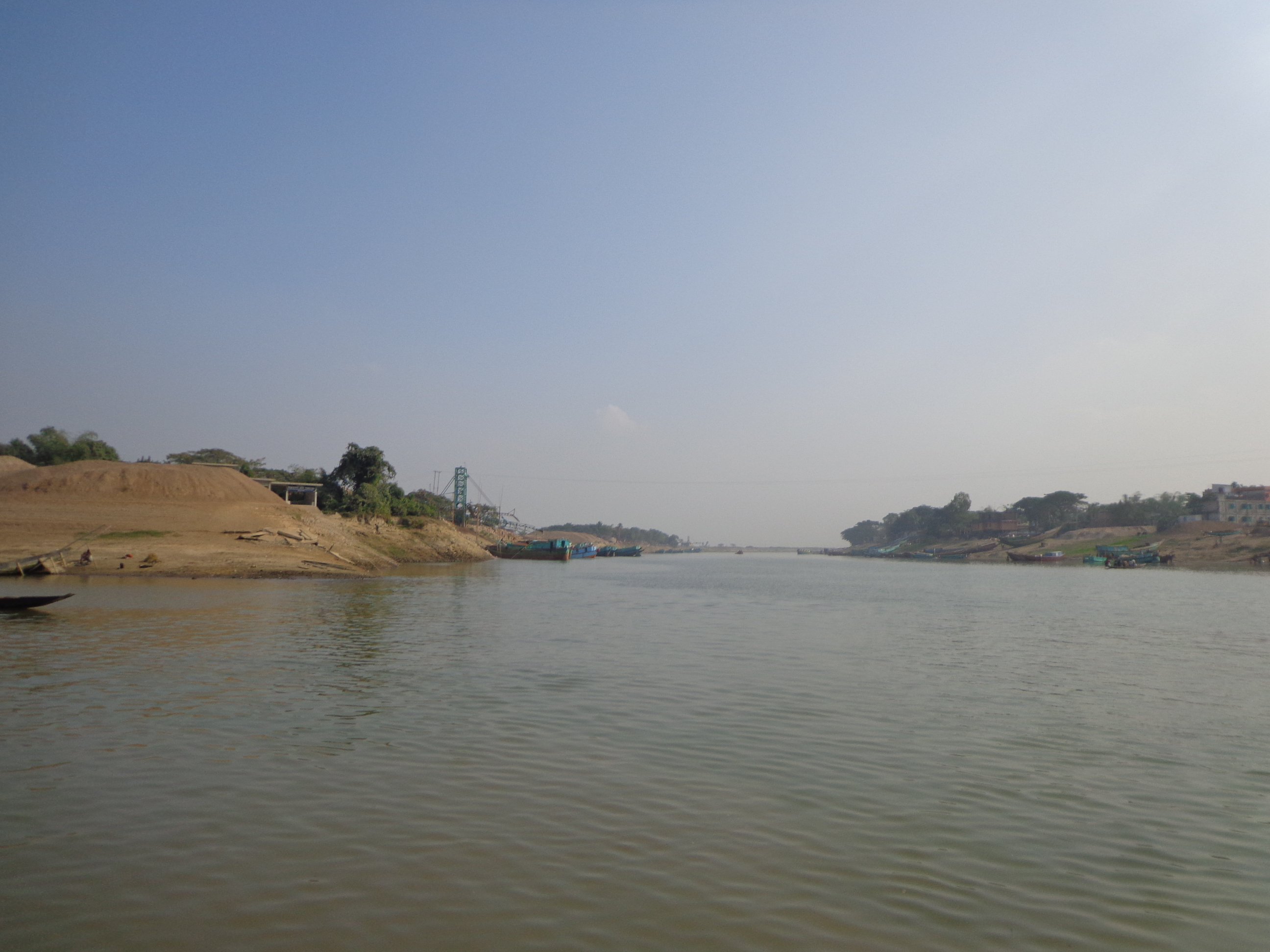
Piyain River at Chhatak Upazila

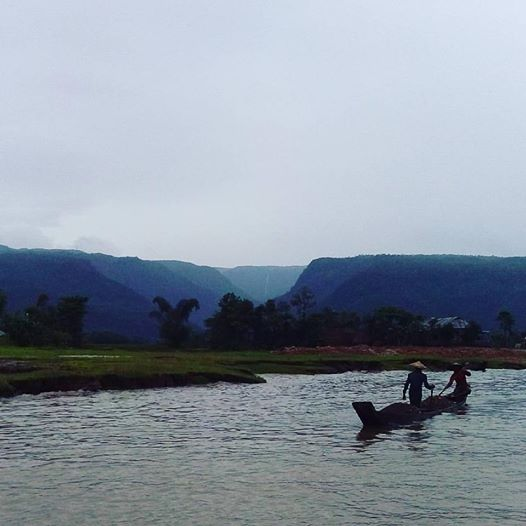
Piyain River. The picture was taken on the way to Bisnakandi
