= Sylhet District =

Sylhet District সিলেট জেলা
- District of Bangladesh
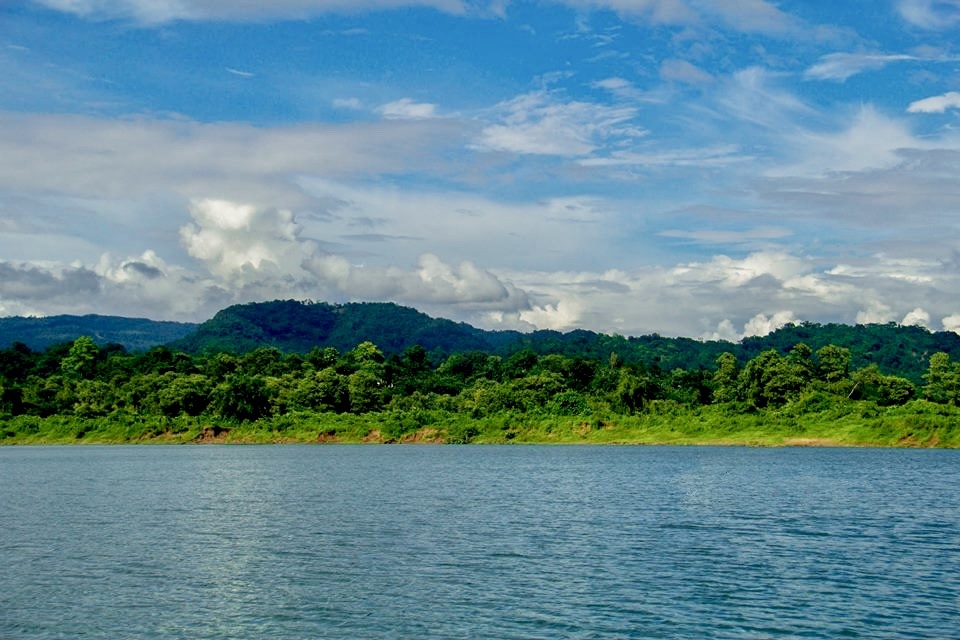
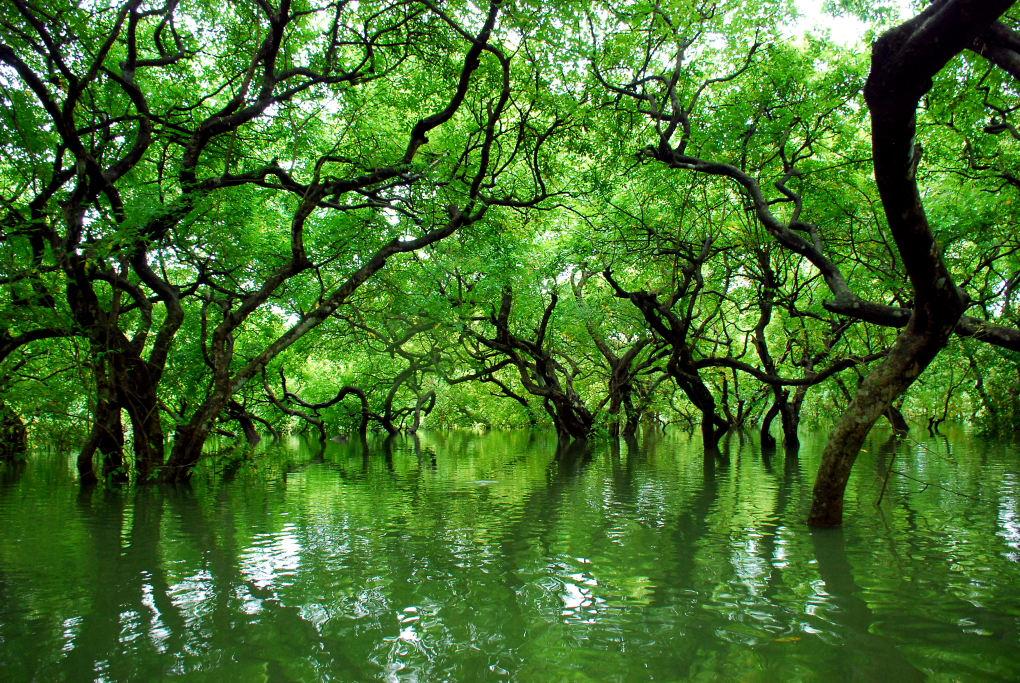
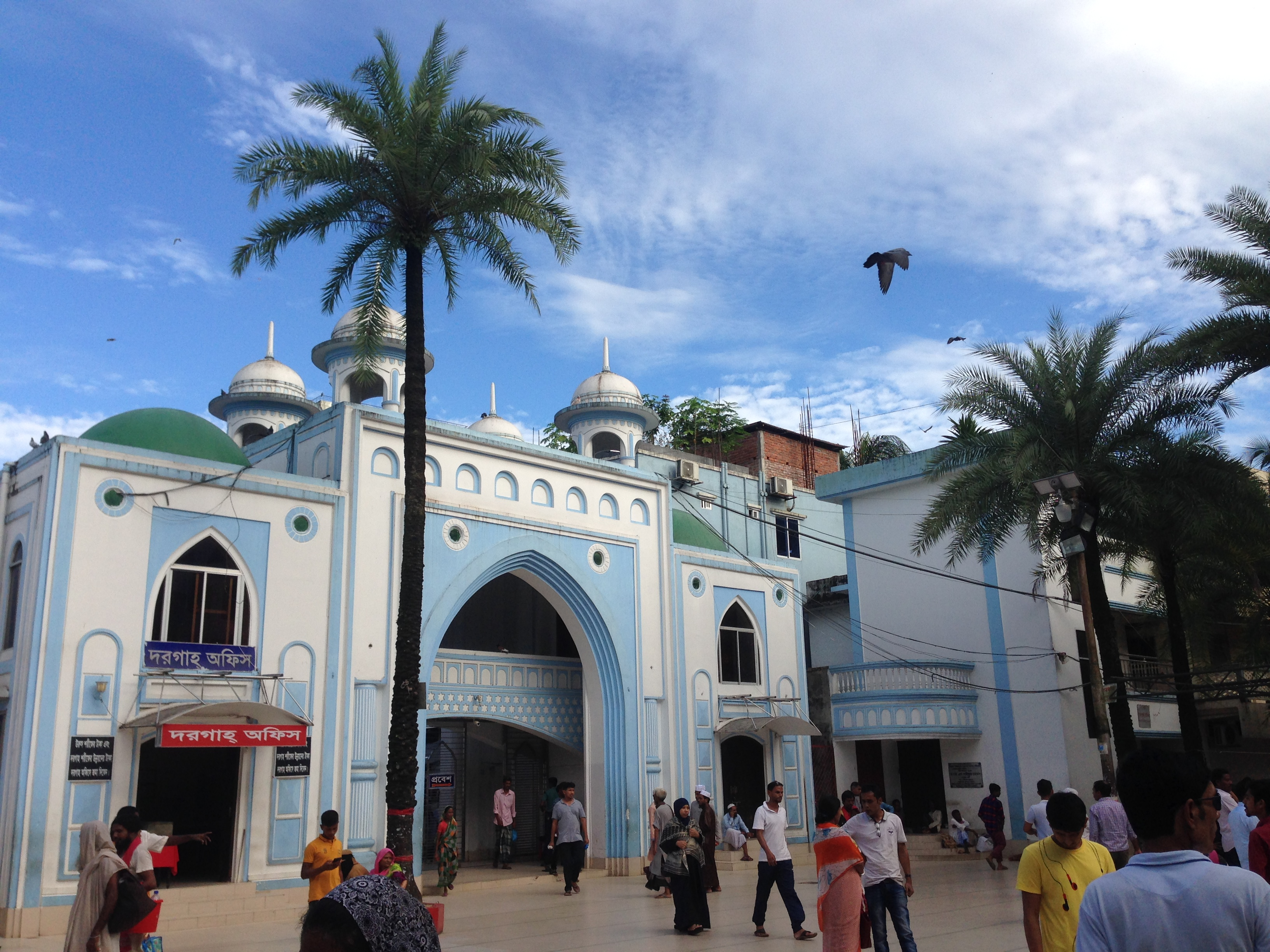
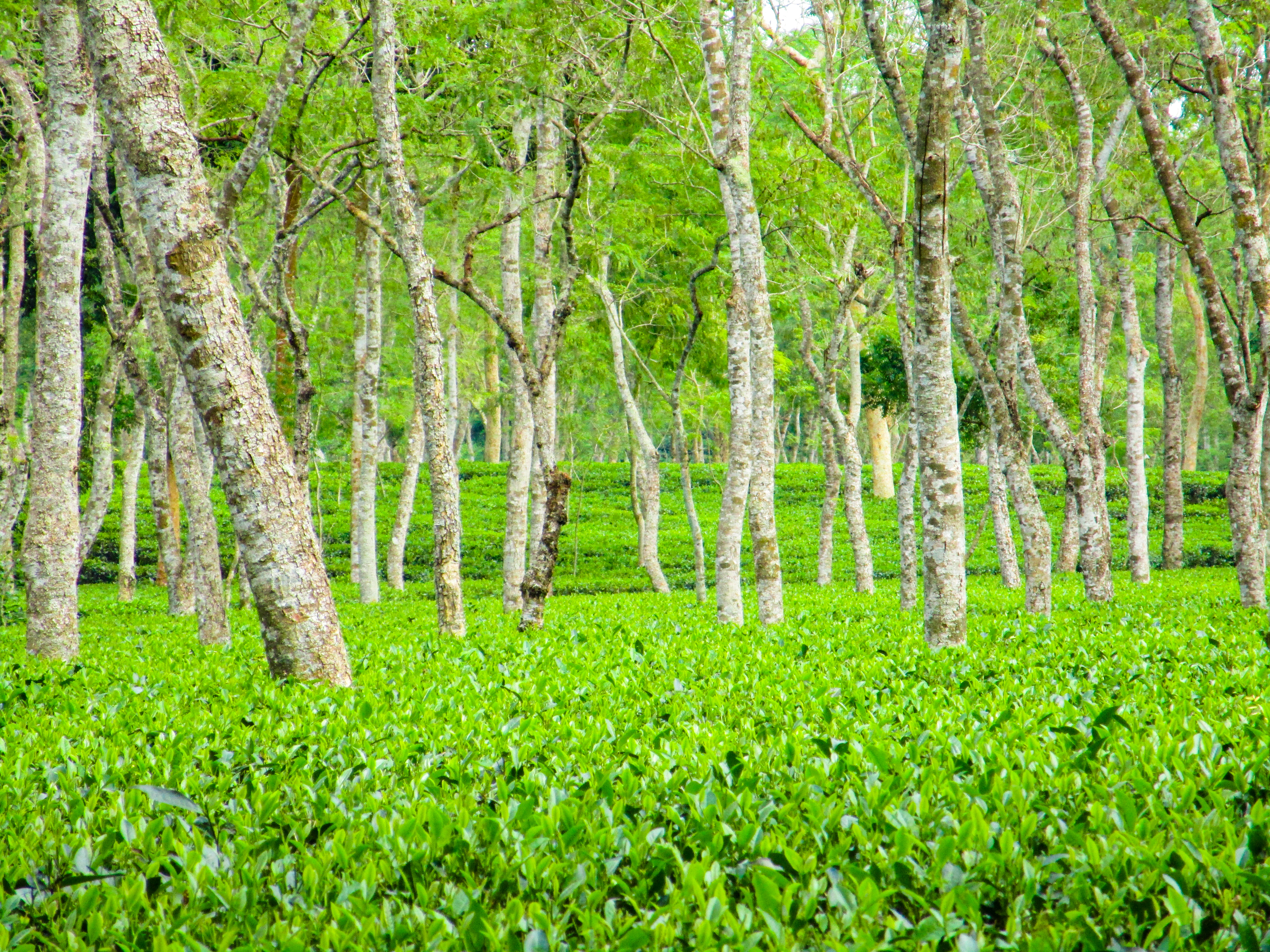
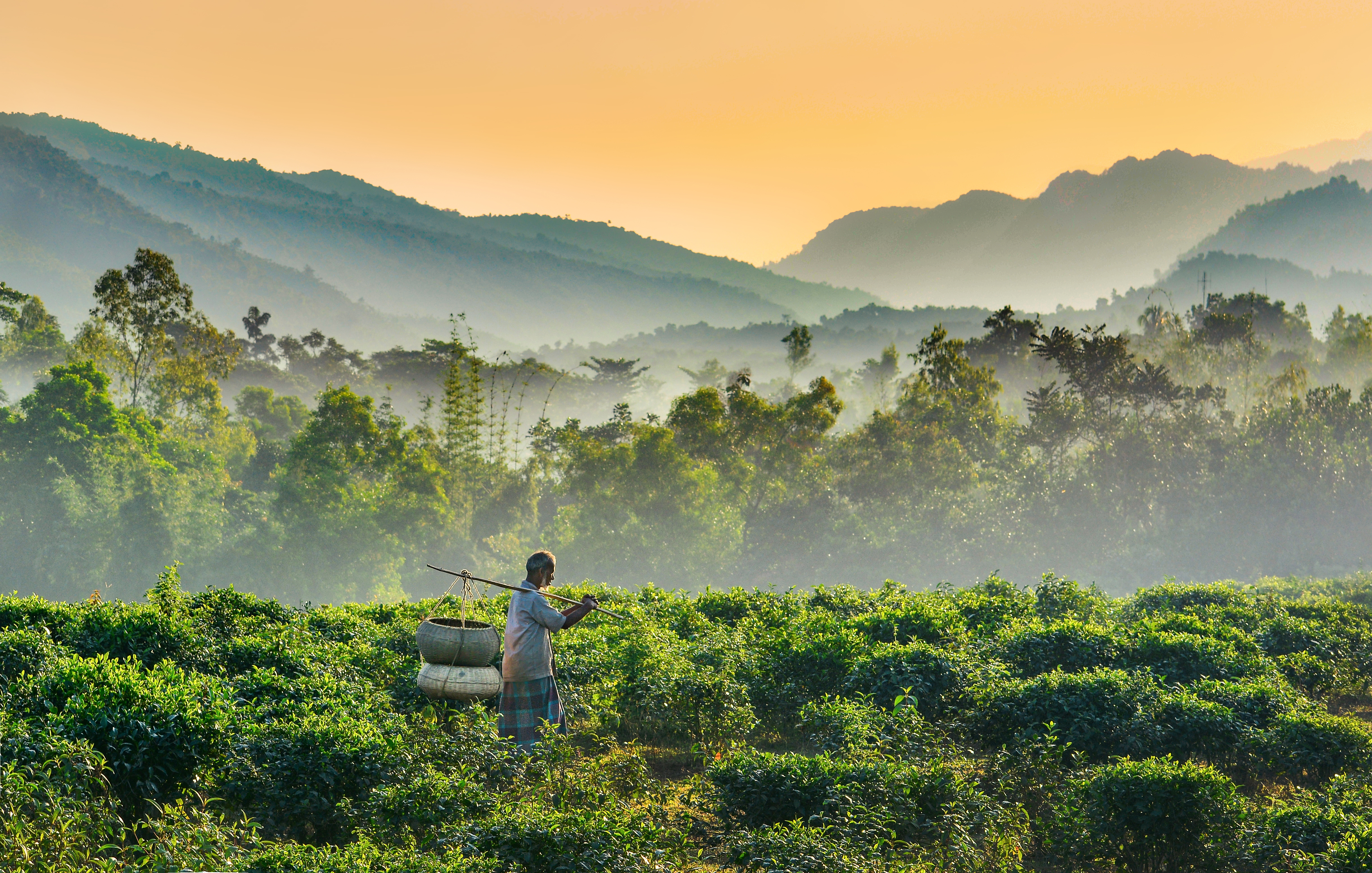
- From top clockwise: Lalakhal at Bichnakandi, Ratargul Swamp Forest, Shah Jalal Dargah, Srimangal tea garden, view of Jaflong hills,
- Nickname: Holy Land/Land of 360 Awliyas
- Location of Sylhet District in Bangladesh
- Expandable map of Sylhet District
- Coordinates: 24°53′N 91°52′E
- Country: Bangladesh
- Division: Sylhet Division
- Established: 1782
- Headquarters: Sylhet

Government
  - Deputy Commissioner: Abdullah Al Mamun

Area
  - Total: 3,452.07 km^{2} (1,332.85 sq mi)

Population (2022)
  - Total: 3,857,123
  - Density: 1,117.34/km^{2} (2,893.89/sq mi)
- Demonym: Sylhetis
- Time zone: UTC+06:00 (BST)
- Postal code: 3100
- Area code: 0821
- ISO 3166 code: BD-60
- HDI (2018): 0.596 medium · 11th of 21
- Website: sylhet.gov.bd

Sylhet District (Bengali: সিলেট জেলা), located in north-east Bangladesh, is one of the four districts in Sylhet Division, which contains Sylhet, the regional capital.

== History ==
Administrative functions of Sylhet District commenced in 1772 when the East India Company appointed William Makepeace Thackeray as its first collector. And until 1878 it remained a part of Bengal Province under the Dhaka Division. However, in that year, Sylhet was moved to the newly created Assam Province, and it remained as part of Assam up to 1947 (except during the administrative reorganisation of Bengal Province between 1905 and 1912). Sylhet District was divided into five subdivisions and the current Sylhet District was known as the North Sylhet subdivision. In 1947, Sylhet became a part of East Pakistan as a result of a referendum (except 3 1/2 thanas of Karimganj subdivision) as part of Chittagong Division. It was subdivided into four districts in 1983–84 with the current Sylhet District being known as North Sylhet. It became a part of Sylhet Division after its formation in 1995. Sylhet has played a vital role in the Bangladeshi economy. Several of Bangladesh's finance ministers have been Members of Parliament from the city of Sylhet.

== Demographics ==
Historical population
Year	Pop.	±% p.a.
1981	1,777,784	—
1991	2,153,301	+1.93%
2001	2,555,566	+1.73%
2011	3,434,188	+3.00%
2022	3,857,123	+1.06%

According to 2022 Census of Bangladesh, Sylhet district had 746854 households and a population of 3,857,123, 26.25% of whom lived in urban areas. The population density was 1,117 people per square kilometre. 20.29% were under 10 years of age. Sylhet district had a literacy rate of 76.43% (for 7 years and above), compared to the national average of 74.80%, and a sex ratio of 96.74 males per 100 females.

According to the census, Sylhet's literacy rate has increased to 76.43%. In contrast, it was 51.18% in 2011, 45.49% in 2001, and 33.85% in 1991. In Sylhet, 89.25% of students were enrolled in general education. Additionally, 7.95% are pursuing religious education, 0.40% are in technical education, and 2.40% are in other forms of education.

In 2022, 65.37% of people aged 15 and above had their own mobile phones. Moreover, 42.02% are internet users, and 31.87% had accounts in banks or financial institutions. The same percentage, 31.87%, also had mobile banking accounts.

According to the 1991 census, 12.99% of people in Sylhet had access to electricity. This increased to 35.14% in 2001 and 62.92% in 2011. As of the 2022 census, this figure has risen to 99.27%.

In terms of employment, 35.58% of Sylhet's population is engaged in agriculture. Additionally, 10.60% are involved in industry, while the remaining 53.82% are engaged in various services.

Religions in Sylhet District (2022)
Religion	Percent
Muslims	92.57%
Hindus	7.33%
Other or not stated	0.10%

Religion in present-day Sylhet District
Religion	1941 (Note: 1941 figures correspond to North Sylhet subdivision and Beanibazar thana of erstwhile Sylhet district, along with part of Karimganj thana. Projected 1941 religion figures for present-day Zakiganj Upazila (which at the time was a rural area of Karimganj thana) were obtained by using the ratio of current upazila population to the 2011 population of erstwhile Karimganj thana to estimate the 1941 population, and assuming religious demographics in rural areas were uniform across erstwhile Karimganj thana.)		1981		1981		2001		2011		2022	
Religion	Pop.	%	Pop.	%	Pop.	%	Pop.	%	Pop.	%	Pop.	%
Islam	599,192	72.55%	1,619,937	91.12%	1,980,175	91.96%	2,365,728	92.57%	3,180,766	92.62%	3,570,400	92.57%
Hinduism	211,701	25.63%	151,809	8.54%	167,966	7.80%	186,565	7.30%	248,154	7.23%	282,904	7.33%
Tribal religion	14,360	1.74%	—N/a	—N/a	—N/a	—N/a	—N/a	—N/a	—N/a	—N/a	—N/a	—N/a
Others (Note: Including Jainism, Christianity, Buddhism, Zoroastrianism, Judaism, Ad-Dharmis, or not stated)	684	0.08%	6,038	0.34%	5,160	0.24%	3,273	0.13%	5,268	0.15%	2,998	0.08%
Total Population	825,937	100%	1,777,784	100%	2,153,301	100%	2,555,566	100%	3,434,188	100%	3,857,123	100%

According to the 2022 data, 92.57% of the total population in Sylhet were Muslims, and 7.33% were Hindus. There is a population of 2,700 Christians mainly in Gowainghat and Jaintiapur upazilas. Ethnic population is 16,508 (0.43%), of which 2834 were Manipuri, 1,845 Patro and 1,530 Khasi.

== Administration ==
Sylhet District upazila geocode map

Sylhet District is divided into thirteen upazilas.

The upazilas are:

- Balaganj
- Beanibazar
- Bishwanath
- Companiganj
- Dakshin Surma
- Fenchuganj
- Golapganj
- Gowainghat
- Jaintiapur
- Kanaighat
- Osmani Nagar
- Sylhet Sadar
- Zakiganj

== Geography and climate ==
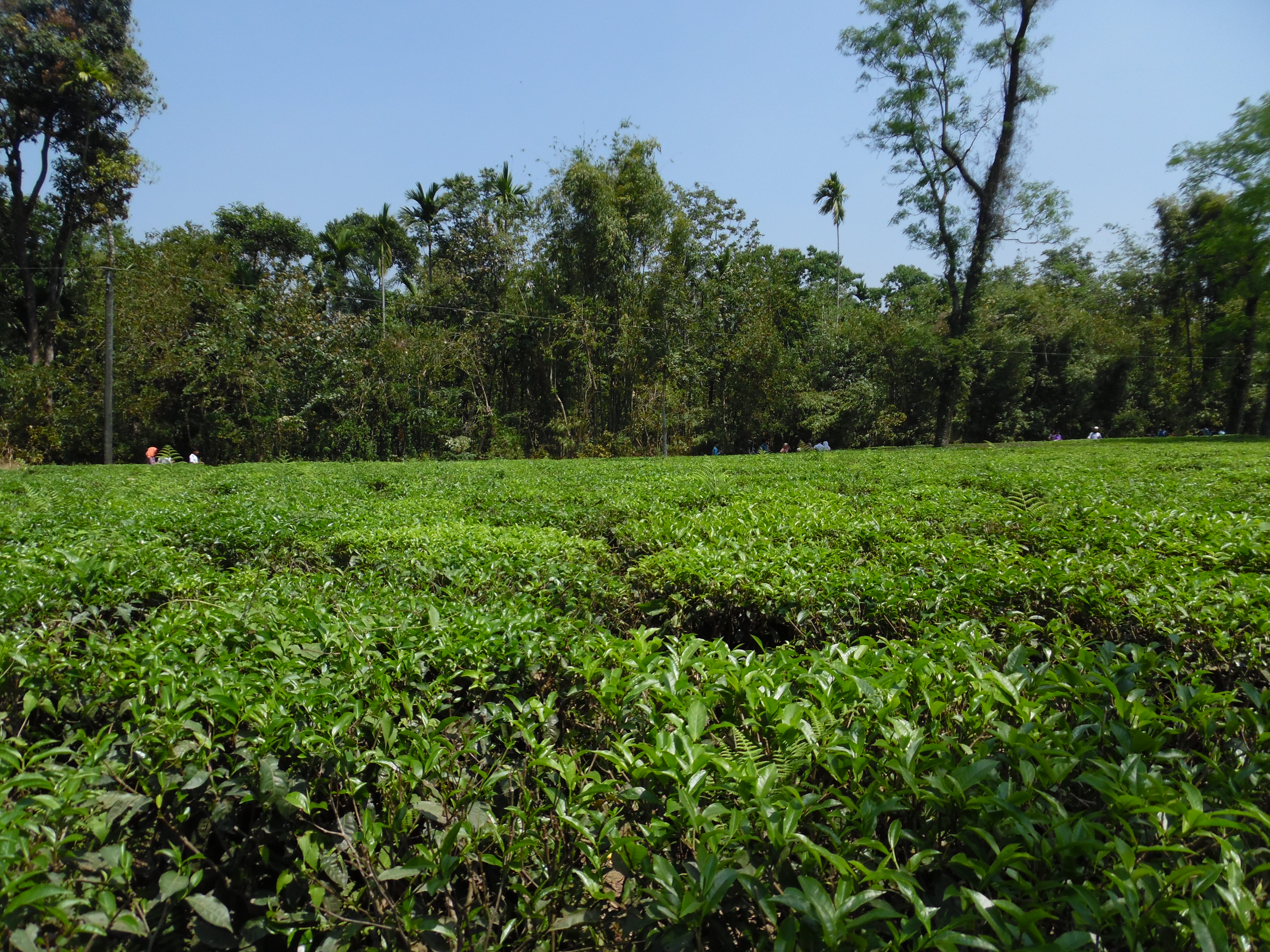
A tea garden at Jaflong, Sylhet

Sylhet has a typical Bangladeshi tropical monsoon climate (Köppen Am) bordering on a humid subtropical climate (Cwa) at higher elevations. The rainy season starts from April to October and it is so hot and humid with very heavy showers and thunderstorms almost every day, whilst the short dry season starts from November to February and it is very warm and fairly clear. Nearly 80% of the annual average rainfall of 4,200 millimetres (170 in) occurs between May and September.

The physiography of Sylhet consists mainly of hill soils, encompassing a few large depressions known locally as "beels" which can be mainly classified as oxbow lakes, caused by tectonic subsidence primarily during the earthquake of 1762.

Geologically, the region is complex, having diverse sacrificial geomorphology; high topography of Plio-Miocene age. Limestone deposits in different parts of the region suggest that the whole area was under the ocean in the Oligo-Miocene. In the last 150 years. three major earthquakes hit the city at a magnitude of at least 7.5 on the Richter Scale, the last one took place in 1918, although many people are unaware that Sylhet lies on an earthquake prone zone.

Shah Arefin Tila is a boulder-rich hill located in Companiganj Upazila of Sylhet District, Bangladesh. It forms part of Sylhet's renowned 'white stone' zone and has both touristic and geological value. Stone extraction at the hill was officially banned in 2016 due to environmental concerns. Later, in 2025, the Interim Government of Muhammad Yunus suspended leases of 17 quarries nationwide, including Shah Arefin Tila.

Climate data for Sylhet (1991–2020 normals, extremes 1952–present)
Month	Jan	Feb	Mar	Apr	May	Jun	Jul	Aug	Sep	Oct	Nov	Dec	Year
Record high °C (°F)	34.5 (94.1)	35.0 (95.0)	38.8 (101.8)	40.5 (104.9)	38.2 (100.8)	39.6 (103.3)	38.4 (101.1)	37.9 (100.2)	38.3 (100.9)	37.2 (99.0)	35.3 (95.5)	31.3 (88.3)	40.5 (104.9)
Mean daily maximum °C (°F)	25.6 (78.1)	28.2 (82.8)	31.2 (88.2)	31.5 (88.7)	31.4 (88.5)	31.6 (88.9)	32.2 (90.0)	32.5 (90.5)	32.3 (90.1)	31.8 (89.2)	29.7 (85.5)	26.8 (80.2)	30.4 (86.7)
Daily mean °C (°F)	18.4 (65.1)	20.8 (69.4)	24.3 (75.7)	26.0 (78.8)	26.8 (80.2)	27.6 (81.7)	28.0 (82.4)	28.2 (82.8)	27.9 (82.2)	26.7 (80.1)	23.3 (73.9)	19.7 (67.5)	24.8 (76.6)
Mean daily minimum °C (°F)	9.8 (49.6)	12.4 (54.3)	17.4 (63.3)	21.2 (70.2)	23.0 (73.4)	24.8 (76.6)	25.3 (77.5)	25.3 (77.5)	24.8 (76.6)	22.3 (72.1)	16.6 (61.9)	11.8 (53.2)	19.6 (67.3)
Record low °C (°F)	3.4 (38.1)	8.8 (47.8)	11.5 (52.7)	14.0 (57.2)	18.0 (64.4)	18.0 (64.4)	19.3 (66.7)	22.3 (72.1)	20.5 (68.9)	16.5 (61.7)	13.4 (56.1)	8.0 (46.4)	3.4 (38.1)
Average precipitation mm (inches)	7 (0.3)	38 (1.5)	127 (5.0)	382 (15.0)	590 (23.2)	795 (31.3)	723 (28.5)	609 (24.0)	496 (19.5)	201 (7.9)	25 (1.0)	10 (0.4)	4,003 (157.6)
Average precipitation days (≥ 1 mm)	1	3	7	15	22	26	28	26	20	10	2	1	161
Average relative humidity (%)	75	68	68	76	81	87	87	86	86	83	77	75	79
Mean monthly sunshine hours	212.2	210.6	223.2	196.1	178.6	121.9	132.8	145.1	148.7	218.9	242.9	238.0	2,269
Source 1: NOAA
Source 2: Bangladesh Meteorological Department (humidity 1981-2010)

== Notable people ==
- M.A.G. Osmani, Commander-in-Chief of the Mukti Bahini during the Separation War.
- Md. Saifur Rahman, former Finance and Planning Minister
- Shah Jalal, Sufi saint and mystic.
- Shah Paran, Sufi saint
- Shah Abdul Karim, Baul folk singer, composer.
- Swami Nikhilananda, Ramakrishna Math and Mission Order monk and founder-minister, Ramakrishna-Vivekananda Center, New York City 1933–1973
- Swami Gambhirananda, Ramakrish Math and Mission Order monk and president of the Order 1985–1988
- Nurul Islam Nahid, former Education Minister of Bangladesh
- Govinda Chandra Dev (1 February 1907 – 26 March 1971), known as G. C. Dev, was a professor of philosophy at the University of Dhaka. He was assassinated at the onset of War of Independence of 1971 by the Pakistan Army
- Dr Abdul Malik, National Professor, Brigadier (rtd.), cardiologist, founder and president of National Heart Foundation of Bangladesh
- Rushanara Ali, first Bangladeshi to be elected as an MP for the British parliament
- Ajmal Masroor, television presenter, politician and imam, parliamentary candidate for a UK Parliament constituency
- Lutfur Rahman, the first elected mayor of the London Borough of Tower Hamlets council
- Mukhlesur Rahman Chowdhury, former minister and adviser to the president of Bangladesh
- Humayun Rashid Choudhury, diplomat, UN General Assembly President, Awami League leader and former speaker of National parliament
- Dilwar Khan, poet
- Salman Shah, film actor, model
- Sahara Chowdhury, LGBT activist
- Shuvro Dev, playback singer
- Syed Ahmed, businessman, British TV personality
- Badar Uddin Ahmed Kamran, Mayor of Sylhet City Corporation (2003–13)
- Enam Ali, restaurateur and founder of the British Curry Awards

== See also ==
- Chowkideki
- Districts of Bangladesh
- List of colleges in Sylhet
- List of people from Sylhet
- Divisions of Bangladesh
- Upazila
- Thana
