= Abu Nasr Waheed =

Bengali Islamic scholar (1878–1953)

Shamsul Ulama Mawlana Abu Nasr Wahid
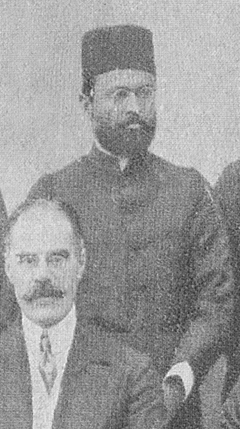

Personal life
- Born: 21 September 1878 Sylhet, North-East Frontier, British India
- Died: 31 May 1953 (aged 74) Dacca, East Bengal, Pakistan
- Resting place: Shah Saheb Lane Cemetery, Narinda, Old Dhaka
- Parent: Jawed Bakht (father)
- Education: Sylhet Govt. High School; Murari Chand College; Presidency College
- Relatives: Faizunnesa Choudhurani (great-grandmother-in-law)

Religious life
- Religion: Islam
- Denomination: Sunni
- Jurisprudence: Hanafi

Muslim leader
- Students: Abdul Hamid, Muhammed Saadulah, Amiruddin Ahmad, A.S.M. Akram, Amin Ahmed
- Influenced by: Abdul Awwal Jaunpuri
- Influenced: Muin-ud-din Ahmad Khan, Sayed Moazzem Hossain, Abdul Jabbar Khan, Serajul Huq

Education Minister of Assam
- In office April 1937 – February 1938
- Prime Minister: Muhammed Saadulah

Member of the 1st Assam Legislative Assembly
- In office 19 January 1937 – 1946
- Constituency: Sylhet Sadar
- Arabic name
- Personal (Ism): Muḥammad Waḥīd محمد وحيد
- Patronymic (Nasab): ibn Jāwīd Bakht بن جاويد بخت
- Teknonymic (Kunya): Abū Naṣr أبو نصر

Abū Naṣr Muḥammad Waḥīd (Arabic: أبو نصر محمد وحيد, Bengali: আবু নসর মুহম্মদ ওহীদ; 21 September 1878 – 31 May 1953), or simply Abu Nasr Waheed, was a Bengali Islamic scholar, educationist, author and politician. He is best known for his reformations to Islamic education in Bengal, and development of Arabic language education among Bengali Muslims. Wahid also served as the Education Minister of British Assam and a member of the Assam Legislative Assembly.

== Early life and family ==
Muhammad Wahid was born on 21 September 1878, to a middle class Bengali Muslim family in the Moulvi Bari of the Hawapara neighbourhood of Sylhet, which was then under the North-East Frontier in British India. His father, Muhammad Jawed Bakht, was a qari and khalifah of Karamat Ali Jaunpuri. His family were originally from the village of Kalaruka in Chhatak, Sunamganj.

== Education ==
Wahid was initially homeschooled with an Islamic education by his father, Qari Muhammad Jawed Bakht. He then joined the Sylhet Government High School from where he completed his matriculation in 1892. He then gained admission to the local Murari Chand College where he received his FA in 1895. Wahid then enrolled at the Presidency College in Calcutta, undertaking a bachelor's and master's in Arabic language. He was the first Bengali Muslim to undertake degrees in Arabic under the British system, having graduated in 1897. He did another BA from Dacca University.

== Career ==
After completing his education, Wahid became a teacher at the Sylhet Government High School and among his students were Abdul Hamid and Basanta Kumar Das. After a while, Wahid returned to Calcutta to study law whilst teaching at the Calcutta Alia Madrasa. Among his students in Calcutta were Amiruddin Ahmad, A.S.M. Akram and Amin Ahmed.

Wahid later abandoned his legal studies and became the professor of Arabic and Persian at the Cotton College in Gauhati, Assam. He also briefly taught logic and English. Among his students in Gauhati was Muhammed Saadulah. The government attempted to transfer Wahid to Hooghly Mohsin College, but this was stopped by Khwaja Salimullah, the Nawab of Dacca, who assisted in Wahid transferring to Dacca Mohsinia Madrasa. Wahid served as superintendent of the Dacca Mohsinia Madrasa from 1905 to 1919. In 1906, he travelled across the Muslim world in countries such as Turkey, Syria, Palestine and Egypt. He also toured European institutions, visiting Berlin, Budapest, Paris and Vienna. On his return to the subcontinent, Wahid also visited Darul Uloom Deoband and the Islamic seminaries of Rampur and Lucknow. His travels were a means of surveying and researching different educational systems to inspire his Islamic educational reforms in Bengal. After consulting numerous ulama across the world, he formulated the reformed New Scheme madrasa system as the head of the Mohammedan Education Advisory Committee in 1914. The scheme modernised Islamic education in Bengal. In 1919, he became the first principal of Islamic Intermediate College in Dacca, with other Islamic Intermediate Colleges being found in Hooghly and Chittagong. He was a member of the 13-member founding committee of Dacca University. After its establishment in 1921, Wahid additionally served as a professor and the inaugural Head and founder of the Department of Arabic and Islamic Studies at the university. Wahid also founded the same department at a university in Patna, Bihar. Wahid served as secretary and as a member in many university committees such as the Madrasah Reform Committee in 1906, the Earle Conference in 1907, the Sharf Committee in 1909, the Nathan Committee in 1912 and many more. Wahid retired in 1927. At his initiative in 1935, the Sylhet Government Alia Madrasah became the first madrasa in Bengal to receive kamil status.

Wahid was also known to have brought to light a Shah Jalal Dargah inscription kept in the house of Sheikh Abdul Haq, his sister's father-in-law, in Ambarkhana, Sylhet. He presented it to Dacca Museum where it is still kept.

=== Political career ===
Wahid contested in the first parliamentary elections for the Assam Legislative Assembly and was successfully elected to the Sylhet Sadar constituency. He also served as Assam's education minister from April 1937 to February 1938 in the cabinet of Muhammed Saadulah.

=== Literary career ===
Abu Nasr Wahid wrote many books in Arabic and Bengali, and was also fluent in English, Persian and Urdu. He wrote books on Arabic literature such as Barakat al-Adab and Mirqah al-Adab (for beginners), and other books such as Khutbah an-Nabi, Salsil Qiraat, Nukhab (selected stories from Kalīla wa-Dimna, One Thousand and One Nights and Brethren of Purity), Nukhab al-Ulum and Madarij al-Qiraat. His most famous work in Bengali is Diniyat Shikkha (Religious Education). He also contributed to primary school Bengali textbooks.

== Personal life ==
Wahid was married to Syeda Masuda Khatun, but after her death, he married her sister Syeda Ammatul Batool Nanni Begum. His father-in-law, Syed Abdul Jabbar of Taraf, a zamindar based in Comilla. (Note: Abdul Jabbar had relocated to Comilla after inheriting parts of the Bhauksar zamindari after his first marriage in 1870 to Syeda Ummatul Ela Afiyah Khatun, the granddaughter of Muhammad Ghazi Chowdhury of Bhauksar and Faizunnesa Choudhurani.) Wahid had two sons. His daughter, Afsari Begum, married Syed Ahmadullah, son of Syed Azizullah. He embarked on the Hajj pilgrimage in 1934.

== Awards ==
In 1909, Wahid was awarded the title of Shamsul Ulama. He was made a cadre of the Indian Education Service in 1921.

== Death and legacy ==
Wahid died on 31 May 1953, in Dacca, East Bengal. He was buried in the family cemetery of Shah Ahsanullah, the Pir of Musurikhala in Narinda.
