= Amimul Ehsan Barkati =

Indian scholar

Mufti Amimul Ehsan Barkati
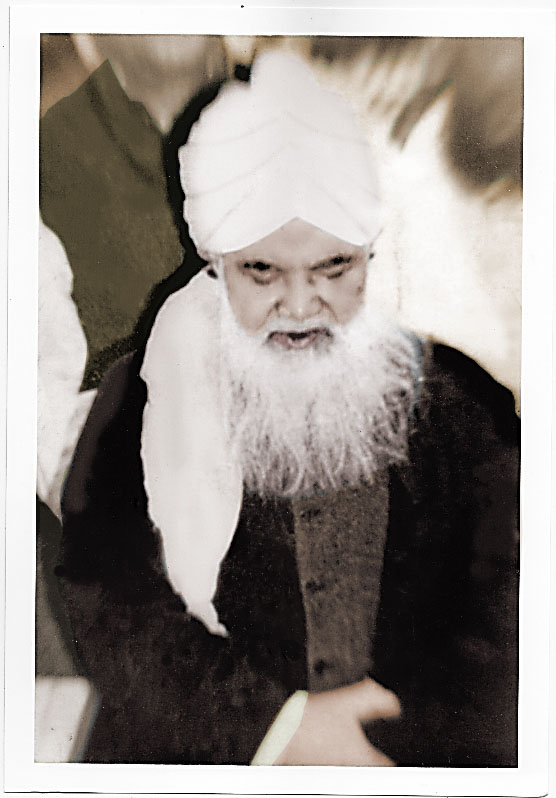

Personal life
- Born: 24 January 1911 (22 Muharram, 1329 Hijri) Pachna, Bihar, India
- Died: 27 October 1974 (aged 63) Dhaka, Bangladesh
- Era: 20th century
- Main interest(s): Islamic law Hadith; Fiqh; Tafsir
- Notable work(s): Fiqhus-sunan wal Athar; Qawa'idul-Fiqh; Fatwa-e-Barkati; Hadiyatul Musallin

Religious life
- Religion: Islam
- Denomination: Sunni
- Jurisprudence: Hanafi
- Tariqa: Naqshbandi (Mujaddidi-Barkati)

Muslim leader
- Teacher: Belayet Hossain Birbhumi
- Awards: Islamic Foundation Award (1984)
- Arabic name
- Personal (Ism): Muḥammad محمد أميم الإحسان
- Patronymic (Nasab): ibn Muḥammad ʿAbd al-Mannān ibn ʿAbd an-Nūr ibn Shahāmat ʿAlī ibn Muẓaffar ʿAlī بن محمد عبد المنان بن عبد النور بن شهامت علي بن مظفر علي
- Toponymic (Nisba): al-Barkatī البركتي

Khatib of Baitul Mukarram
- In office 1964–1974
- Preceded by: Usman Madani
- Succeeded by: Abdul Muiz

Head Mawlana of Dhaka Alia Madrasa
- In office 1954–1969
- Preceded by: Zafar Ahmad Usmani
- Succeeded by: Abdur Rahman Kashgari

Syed Muhammad Amimul Ehsan Barkati (1911–1974, Urdu: سيد محمد عميم الاحسان بركتى, Bengali: সাইয়্যেদ মুহম্মদ আমীমুল এহসান বরকতী) was a Bangladeshi Islamic scholar who served as the third Khatib of the Baitul Mukarram National Mosque.

== Early life ==
Syed Muhammad Amimul Ehsan was born on 24 January 1911 in his maternal grandfather's house located in the village of Pachna in Munger district, Bihar. Ehsan was second child of Hakeem Syed Abul Azeem Muhammad Abdul Mannan and Syeda Sajida, among his four brothers and three sisters. His father relocated to Calcutta, where Ehsan spent his childhood.

He was also from Feni.

== Education ==
He received his primary Islamic education from his paternal uncle Abdul Dayyan. Later on, he had gained the knowledge of Tasawwuf from the Shah Abu Barkat Ali Shah who was a follower of the Mujaddidi branch of the Naqshbandi Tariqah. As he had become a murid of him, he added the title Barkati to his surname.

Barkati acquired his academic learning from the famous Calcutta Aliah Madrasah in 1926.

== Career ==
In 1934, Barkati was appointed as the Imam and teacher of Calcutta Nakhoda Masjid. In 1935 he also got the responsibility of Head Mufti of that madrasa's Darul Ifta. In 1943, he joined Calcutta Aliya Madrasah. In 1971 he became the khatib of Baitul Mukarram, later the national mosque of Bangladesh. He held that position until his death in 1974.

== Works ==
Barkati's works include:

1. Fiqhus-sunan wal Asar
2. Qawa'idul-Fiqh
3. Fatwae Barkati
4. Adabul Mufti
5. Al-Usool-ul-kargee
6. Usolul masailut iktilfat
7. At tasruf li Adabit Tasuuf
8. At-tanjed fe tawhid
9. At tanver fe usole tafseer
10. Tariqe Islam
11. Tariqe Ilme Haddes
12. Tariqe Ilme Fiqh
13. Sirajum munira Milad nama (سراجا منير)
14. Tarikae Hajj
15. Lubbul Usol
16. Maske Fariez
17. Minnatul bari
18. Mijanul Akbar
19. Miyarul Asar
20. Wasiyatnama
21. hadiyatul Musallin

== Personal life ==
Barkati married Maymuna, daughter of his mentor and a Sufi saint Abu Muhammad Barkat Ali Shah. after death of Maymuna, he married Fatima and they have a son, Munim, and a daughter, Amina. Munim died when he was a child. His second wife died in 1937. He married Khadija and lived with her until his death. Among all the children of Barkati, only her youngest daughter Amina Khatun was alive during his death. She died in 1990. Barkati performed Hajj three times: in 1954, 1958 and in 1971.

== Death ==
During 1973–74 Barkati's health started to deteriorate. In the year 1974 the committee of Baitul Mukarram had some issues with him to which he decided to not go again in Baitul Mukarram for further Juma prayer. He returns the key of his room and said, "I will not be coming next week". He died on 27 October 1974, 10th Shawwal 1394 Hijri. Next day on 28 October his funeral prayer was held at Baitul Mukarram.

== Recognition ==
Daily Inqilab says he has been recognised as a Grand Mufti of Kolkata by Calcutta government of British India in 1935.

Alokito Bangladesh says he had received gold medal and certificates in 1974 for his contribution towards Islamic missionaries from Bangladesh Government.
