= Amar MP =

Voluntary Social Organization in Bangladesh

Amar MP Social Voluntary Organization
- Amar MP
- Logo of Amar MP
- Formation: 14 February 2017; 9 years ago
- Founder: Sushanta Das Gupta
- Location: Amar MP, Lovely Villa, Ground Floor, Commercial Area, Habiganj Sadar, Habiganj-3300, Bangladesh
- Official language: (in Bengali)
- Chairman: Sushanta Das Gupta
- Affiliations: Information and Communication Technology Division, Bangladesh
- Staff: 15 (2019)
- Volunteers: 15000 & 350 Ambassadors (2019)
- Website: amarmp.com

Amar MP is a voluntary social organization, which was established on 14 February 2017. The organization has been formed to connect Members of Parliament with the voters of Bangladesh to ensure accountability, transparency and neutrality among MPs. The organization has won several international awards, including "the Best Regional Enterprise". On 20 December 2017, Europe Business Enggel (EABA) nominated AmarMP as "Best Regional Enterprise" from the United Nations. This organization also received the mBillionth Award by India's Digital Empowerment Foundation (DEF).

== History ==
Amar MP was established and registered on 14 February 2017 with the aim to bring accountability among the Jatiya Sangsad members. Amar MP was officially launched on 16 January 2018 by Minister of Information and Communication Technology, Junaid Ahmed Palak. Abu Zahir Chowdhury MP (Habiganj-3) gave the first answer by AmarMP platform. The first answer by video was given by MP Moin Uddin Khan Badal by Video. He is the lawmaker from Chittagong-8 constituency. AmarMP.com has received the Bangladesh Parliament's recognition of offering No Objection Certificate (NOC) for the excellent work done by the organisation on 26 September 2017. Prime Minister's Information and Technology Advisor Sajeeb Wazed Joy congratulated the Bangladeshi voluntary organization 'AmarMP' for achieving the mBillionth Award in 2017.

== Activities ==
Amar MP organised a series of talk shows at the Channel 24, Bangladesh before the 11th Parliamentary Election of Bangladesh. It created huge wave at Bangladesh politics. Amar MP is very vocal at raising voice when it sees any corruption at any sector in Bangladesh. Amar MP won the mBillionth Award by Digital Empowerment Foundation (DEF)on 4 August 2017. Prime Minister's Information and Technology Advisor Sajeeb Wazed Joy congratulated Amar MP on receiving mBillionth Award. Amar MP organized a human chain at Sylhet on 19 February 2019 protesting an alleged corruption by Ariful Haque Chowdhury, the Mayor of Sylhet City Corporation and a BNP executive. AmarMP hosted an International seminar regularly at the UK House of Parliament in London on 13 June 2018. The seminar was about Secularism: Hope for Unity, Peace and Justice. amarMP research showed that most of the Members of Parliament in Bangladesh are not vocal on social media. They are afraid of facing their constituents at media. It was the situation before two years; still it continue.

== Awards and honors ==
- mBillionth Award by Digital Empowerment Foundation (DEF)on 4 August 2017.
- THE BIZZ Business Excellence Award (4 August 2017).
- "Open Parliament through Digital Engagement", of Amar MP Social Voluntary Organization, Bangladesh has been nominated in category 7 in the World Summit on the Information Society 2018 Prizes. WSIS an event that is held annually at ITU headquarters in Geneva, Switzerland.
