= 2018 Sylhet City Corporation election =

Mayoral election in Bangladesh

- 30 July 2018
- Registered: 318,138 (▲9.31 pp)
- Turnout: 63.36% (▲1.70 pp)
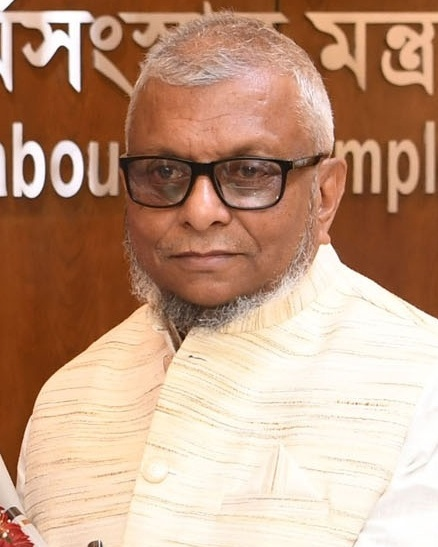
	First party	Second party
Candidate	Ariful Haque Choudhury	Badar Uddin Ahmed Kamran
Party	BNP	AL
Popular vote	92,588	86,392
Percentage	47.74%	44.54%
Swing	▼12.06pp	▲4.34pp
Mayor before election
Ariful Haque Choudhury
BNP
Elected Mayor
Ariful Haque Choudhury
BNP
- Council election
- 30 July 2018; 36 seats in the Sylhet City Corporation
Party	Leader	Seats	+/–
AL	Badar Uddin Ahmed Kamran	19	+6
BNP	Ariful Haque Choudhury	11	−6
Jamaat	Ehsanul Mahbub	2	0
Independent	—	4	0
This lists parties that won seats. See the complete results below.

The 2018 Sylhet City Corporation election was a local government election in the city of Sylhet, Bangladesh, held on 30 July 2018 to elect the Mayor of Sylhet and the Sylhet City Council. The election resulted in a victory for the Bangladesh Nationalist Party candidate Ariful Haque Choudhury. In the 36-member City Council, the Awami League won 19 seats, while the Bangladesh Nationalist Party won 11 seats, Bangladesh Jamaat-e-Islami won 2 seats, and independents won 4 seats.

== Mayoral election results ==
Candidate	Party	Votes	%
Ariful Haque Choudhury	Bangladesh Nationalist Party	92,588	47.74
Badar Uddin Ahmed Kamran	Bangladesh Awami League	86,392	44.54
Ehsanul Mahbub Jubayer	Bangladesh Jamaat-e-Islami	10,954	5.65
Moazzem Hossain	Islami Andolan Bangladesh	2,195	1.13
Md. Abu Jafar	Socialist Party of Bangladesh	909	0.47
Badruzzaman Salim	Independent	592	0.31
Ehsanul Haque Taher	Independent	314	0.16
Total		193,944	100.00
Valid votes		193,944	96.21
Invalid/blank votes		7,633	3.79
Total votes		201,577	100.00
Registered voters/turnout		318,138	63.36

== Council election results ==
=== Party-wise ===
2018 SCC council election results (party-wise)
Party	Seats		
Party	Ward Councilors	Reserved Women Councilors	Total Councilors
Bangladesh Awami League	14	5	19
Bangladesh Nationalist Party	9	2	11
Bangladesh Jamaat-e-Islami	2	—	2
Independent	2	2	4
Total	27	9	36
