= Safiullah Dadaji =

Indian Sufi

Shamsul Ulama Safiullah Dadaji
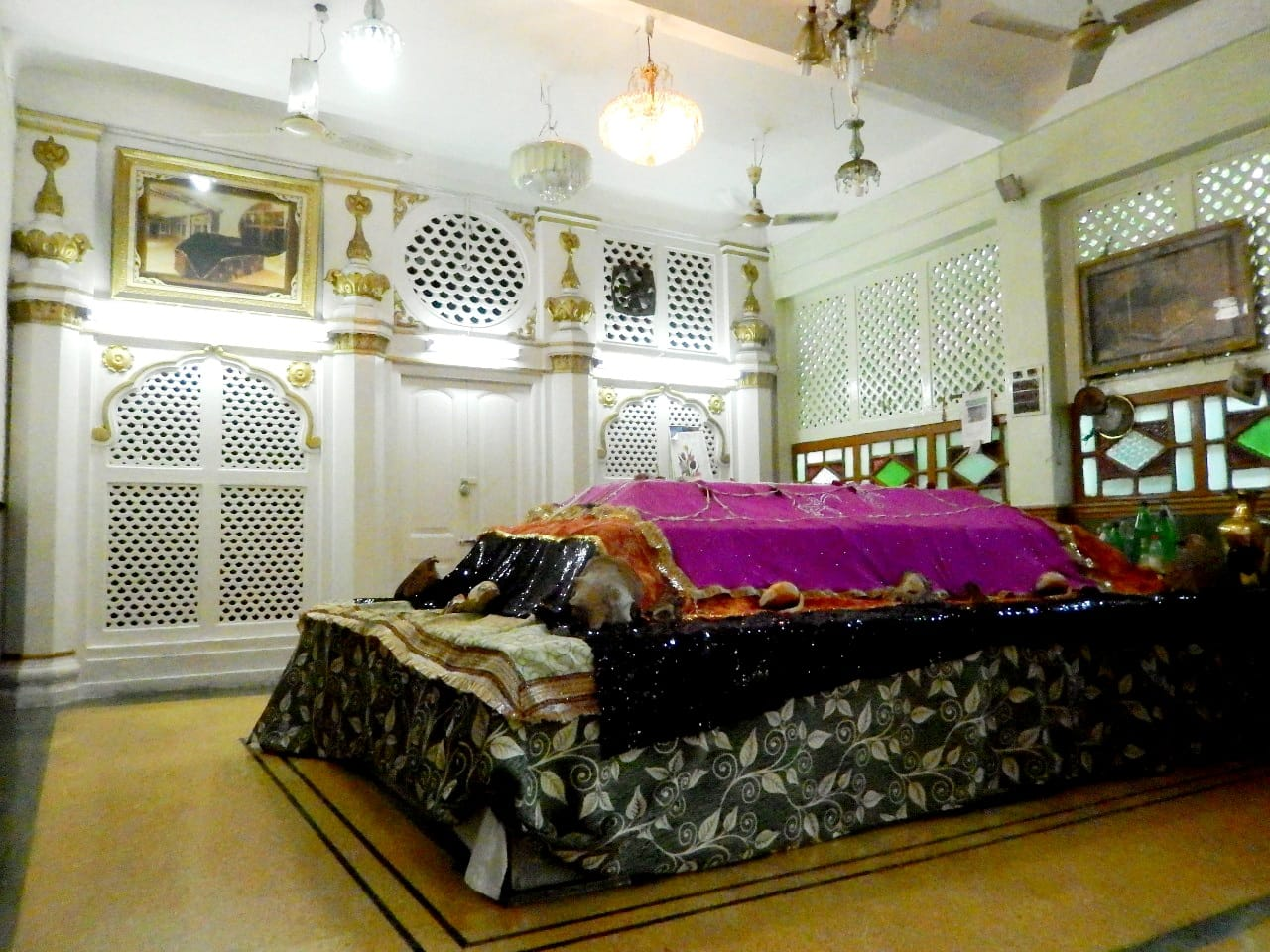
- Shrine of Dadaji

Head Maulana, Kolkata Alia Madrasah
- In office 1927–1929
- Preceded by: Majid Ali Jaunpuri
- Succeeded by: Muhammad Yahya Sasarami

Personal details
- Born: 1870
- Died: 1948 (aged 77–78)
- Relatives: A. T. M. Mustafa (grandchild)
- Profession: Sufi, preacher, philosopher
- Known for: Head Maulana, Kolkata Alia Madrasah

Safiullah Dadaji (Bengali: সফিউল্লাহ দাদাজি; 1870 - 1948) was renowned as Dadaji among the Muslims of Bengal. He was a spiritual scholar, Islamic preacher, philosopher and teacher. He was the Head Maulavi of Calcutta Aliah Madrasah (Now Aliah University). This saint ultimately ended up settling in Kolkata of West Bengal in the Indian subcontinent in early 1900. He did not have any formal education or degree from any established institution, but he was an accomplished Islamic thinker.

== Early life ==
Dadaji was born in 1870 A.D. in Martung Tehsil, of Swat State, in the North-West Frontier Province of Pakistan. His father name Shah Sufi Abdur Rahman, known as Jawwad Shah, also was a great saint. Maulana Safiullah was born in Martung Tehsil, his forefathers belonged to Tara village, in Swat State. Later they settled at Torbanda also in Swat. Dadaji never took any formal education or degree from any established institution.

The family's origin traces back to Yemen, followed by migration to Turkey. It is in Turkey where the family settled and remained for the longest period, establishing a Sufi lineage known as Khan E Khana (also spelled Han i Hana). Their Sufi silsila/traditions started with Owaisia & Qaderia, eventually merged with Chishtiya tradition. The specific Sufi approach they adopted is known as the Malamati Tariqa.

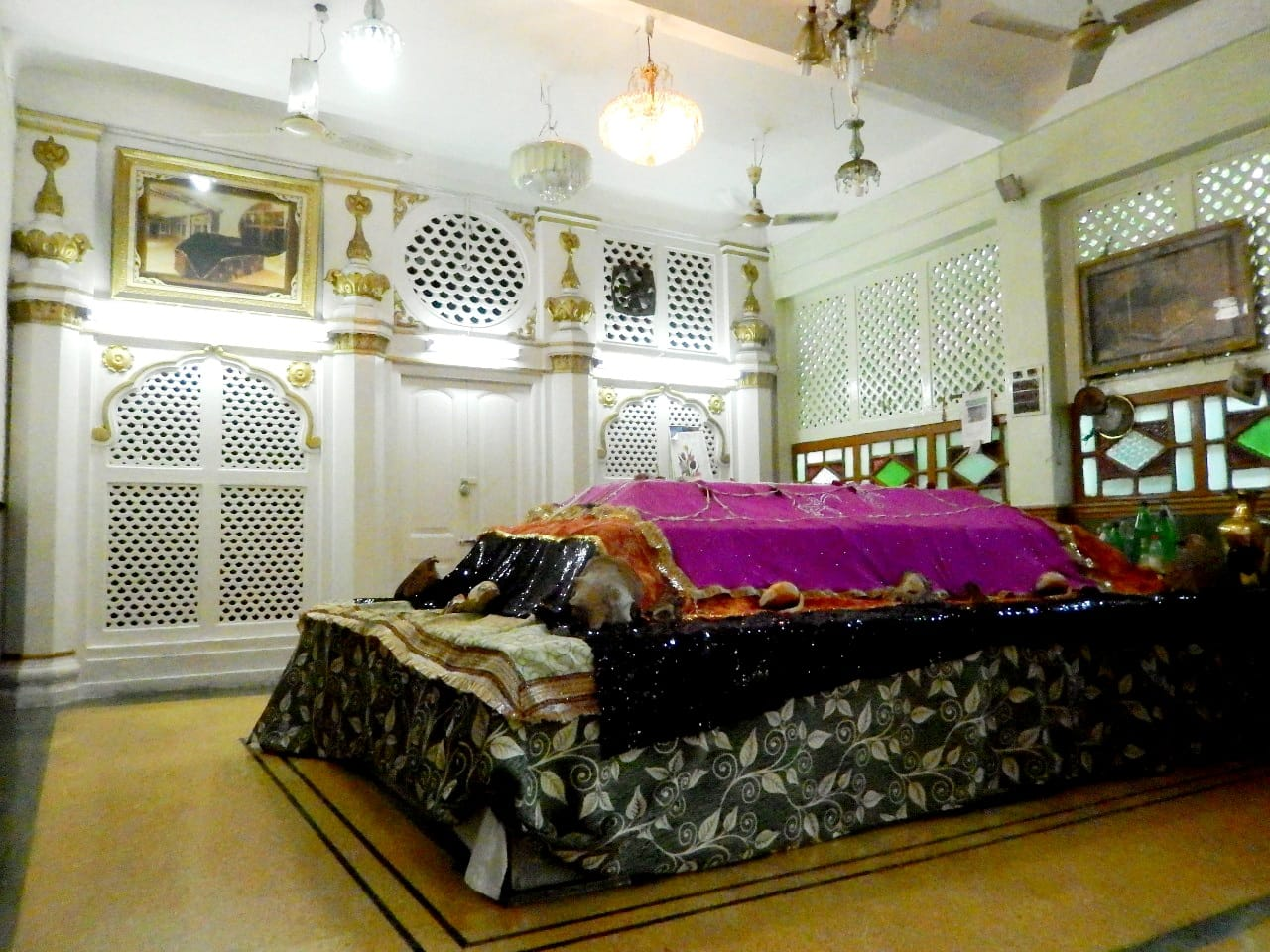
The Holy Shrine of Dadaji in Kolkata

== Career ==
After spending most of his time in the jungle he came to Calcutta to settle down at the age of 31–32 on the advice of another saint. He did this by following Prophet Muhammad who married and had a family. Then he taught at Ramzania Madrasa in Calcutta. At that time a post of additional maulovi was opened in Calcutta Alia Madrasa. The Principal of Madrasa-e-Alia Calcutta was pleased to hear his speech and preferred him for the post of Madrasa. Later he was promoted to become the Head Maulana of the Kolkata Aliya Madrasa.

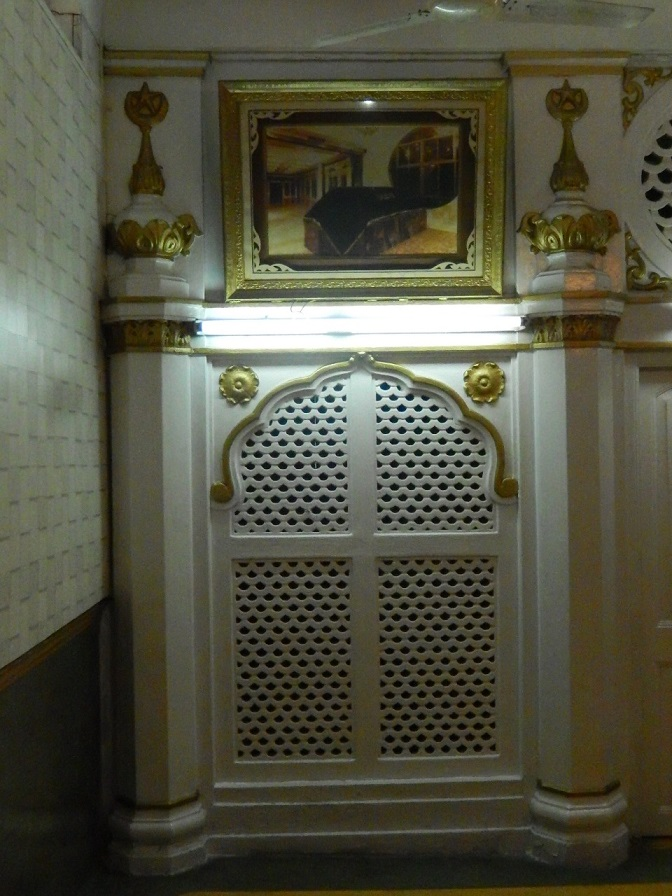
Main gate of Shrine of Dadaji in Kolkata.

Also during his travels he visited many Qutbs, Ghawtes and Auliya shrines and met many saints who helped him in his journey to attain nearness to Allah. He acquired the knowledge of Marifat from them. He met Khizir, the mystic person of Islam, and benefited from his teachings and guidance.

== Death ==
In his old age he suffered from painful carbuncle (a severe boil with multiple boils in the skin), it weakens him physically. He died of this disease in 1948.

== Personal life ==
His eldest son, Maulana Abdul Ghafoor (Baray Bhaiyya), received his education from Kolkata Madrasa and is also a prominent Sufi Islamic scholars. Ziaul Huq Qutubuddin, the youngest son - writer, visiting professor of Islamic studies, Southeast University.
