= Mayor of Sylhet =

Bangladeshi government official

- Incumbent; Abdul Qayyum Chowdhury since 23 February 2026
- Sylhet City Corporation
- Style: Honourable (formal)
- Type: Council Leader
- Member of: Sylhet City Corporation
- Seat: Nagar Bhaban, Sylhet
- Appointer: Electorate of Sylhet
- Term length: Five years, renewable
- Constituting instrument: The City Corporation act, 2009
- Inaugural holder: Badar Uddin Ahmed Kamran
- Formation: 31 July 2001; 25 years ago
- Salary: ৳150000 (US$1,200) per month (incl. allowances)
- Website: Sylhet City Corporation

The Mayor of Sylhet is the chief elected executive of the Sylhet City Corporation. The mayor's office oversees civic services, manages public properties, and coordinates the functions of various government agencies within the city. In addition, the mayor is responsible for enforcing city corporation regulations and state laws.

The mayor's office is located in Nagar Bhaban, Bandor Bazar; currently it has jurisdiction over all 42 wards of Sylhet City, which previously was 27 ward.

== List of officeholders ==
- Bangladesh Awami League
- Bangladesh Nationalist Party

Other factions

- Independent

Status

- Acting mayor and administrator

No.	Portrait	Officeholder (birth–death)	Election	Term of office			Designation	Political party	Reference
No.	Portrait	Officeholder (birth–death)	Election	From	To	Period	Designation	Political party	Reference
1		Badar Uddin Ahmed Kamran (1952-2020)	2003; 2008	12 April 2003	18 September 2013	10 years, 190 days	Mayor	Bangladesh Awami League	
2		Ariful Haque Choudhury	2013; 2018	18 September 2013	7 November 2023	10 years, 50 days	Mayor	Bangladesh Nationalist Party	
3		Anwaruzzaman Chowdhury	2023	7 November 2023	19 August 2024	286 days	Mayor	Bangladesh Awami League	
–		Abu Ahmad Siddiqui	–	19 August 2024	01 December 2024	104 days	Administrator	Independent	
–		Khan Md Reja-Un-Nabi	–	02 December 2024	22 February 2026	1 year, 82 days	Administrator	Independent	
–		Abdul Qayyum Chowdhury	–	23 February 2026	Incumbent	229 days	Administrator	Bangladesh Nationalist Party	

== Elections ==
=== Election result 2023 ===
Sylhet Mayoral Election 2023
Party	Candidate	Votes	%	±%
AL	Anwaruzzaman Chowdhury	119,991	53.18	+10.32
JP(E)	Nazrul Islam Babul	50,862	22.54	New
Independent	Md. Shah Jahan Mia	28,688	12.71	New
IAB	Hafiz Maulana Mahmudul Hasan	12,794	5.67	+4.58
Independent	Abdul Hanif Kutu	4,296	1.90	New
Zaker Party	Zahirul Alam	3,405	1.51	New
Independent	Mushtaq Ahmed Rauf Mostafa	2,959	1.31	New
Independent	Salah Uddin Rimon	2,648	1.17	New
Majority		69,129	30.47	+27.40
Turnout		226,859	46.51%	▼16.88pp
Registered electors		487,753		
AL gain from BNP				

=== Election result 2018 ===
Sylhet Mayoral Election 2018
Party	Candidate	Votes	%	±%
BNP	Ariful Haque Choudhury	92,588	45.92	−13.88
AL	Badar Uddin Ahmed Kamran	86,392	42.86	+2.66
Jamaat	Ehsanul Mahbub Jubayer	10,954	5.44	New
IAB	Moazzem Hossain	2,195	1.09	New
Majority		6,196	3.07	−16.53
Turnout		201,577	63.39%	▲1.73pp
Registered electors		318,138		
BNP hold				

=== Election result 2013 ===
Sylhet Mayoral Election 2013
Party	Candidate	Votes	%	±%
BNP	Ariful Haque Choudhury	107,330	59.80	New
AL	Badar Uddin Ahmed Kamran	72,173	40.20	New
Majority		35,157	19.60	New
Turnout		179,503	61.66	New
Registered electors		291,046		
BNP gain from AL				
