= 2023 Sylhet City Corporation election =

Mayor and council election in Bangladesh

- 21 June 2023
- Registered: 486,605 (▲52.95 pp)
- Turnout: 46.51% (▼16.85 pp)
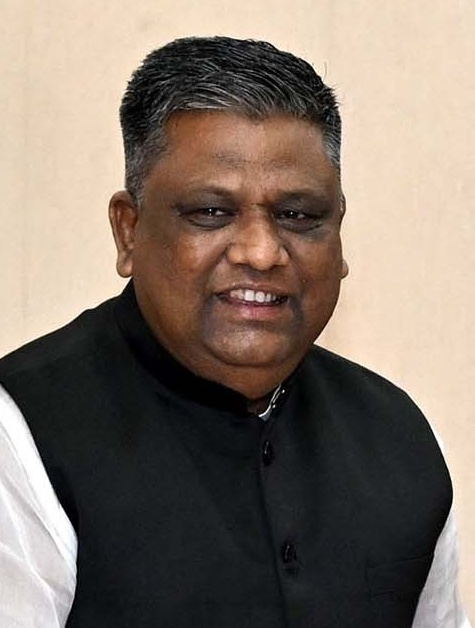
	First party	Second party
Candidate	Anwaruzzaman Chowdhury	Nazrul Islam Babul
Party	AL	JP(E)
Popular vote	119,991	50,862
Percentage	53.18%	22.54%
Swing	▲8.64pp	New
Mayor before election
Ariful Haque Choudhury
BNP
Elected Mayor
Anwaruzzaman Chowdhury
AL
- Council election
- 21 June 2023; 56 seats in the Sylhet City Corporation
Party	Leader	Seats	+/–
AL	Anwaruzzaman Chowdhury	41	+22
BNP	Didn't participate	9	−2
Jamaat	Didn't participate	6	+4
Independent	—	0	−4
This lists parties that won seats. See the complete results below.

The 2023 Sylhet City Corporation election was a local government election in the city of Sylhet, Bangladesh, held on 21 June 2023 to elect the Mayor of Sylhet and the Sylhet City Council. The election resulted in a victory for the Awami League candidate Anwaruzzaman Chowdhury. In the 56-member City Council, the Awami League won 41 seats, while the Bangladesh Nationalist Party won 9 seats and Bangladesh Jamaat-e-Islami won 6 seats.

== Schedule ==
The schedule of the election was announced by the Election Commission of Bangladesh on 29 March 2023.

Event	Date	Day
Date of Notification	3 April 2023	Monday
Deadline for submission of nomination paper	23 May 2023	
Date for scrutiny of nominations	25 May 2023	
Appeal against the nomination paper scrutiny	26-28 May 2023	
Appeal resolve	29-31 May 2023	
Last date for withdrawal of candidatures	1 June 2023	
Symbols distribution	2 June 2023	
Date of poll & counting	21 June 2023	

== Candidates ==
=== Mayoral election ===
A total of 7 candidates were contested for the mayoral post.

Name	Election Symbol	Party	Ref.
Anwaruzzaman Chowdhury	Nouka (Boat)	Bangladesh Awami League	
Hafiz Maulana Mahmudul Hasan	Hatpakha (Hand fan)	Islami Andolon Bangladesh	
Nazrul Islam Babul	Langol (Plough)	Jatiya Party (Ershad)	
Zahirul Alam	Golap ful (Rose)	Zaker Party	
Abdul Hanif Kutu	Ghora (Horse)	Independent	
Chalah Uddin Rimon	Cricket Bat	Independent	
Shah Jahan Mia	Bus	Independent	

=== Council election ===
In Sylhet, 87 candidates were contested for 14 women-reserved seats and 273 were contested for 42 seats of ward councillors.

== Mayoral election results ==
Candidate	Party	Votes	%
Anwaruzzaman Chowdhury	Bangladesh Awami League	119,991	53.18
Nazrul Islam Babul	Jatiya Party (Ershad)	50,862	22.54
Md. Shah Jahan Mia	Independent	28,688	12.71
Hafiz Maulana Mahmudul Hasan	Islami Andolan Bangladesh	12,794	5.67
Abdul Hanif Kutu	Independent	4,296	1.90
Zahirul Alam	Zaker Party	3,405	1.51
Mushtaq Ahmed Rauf Mostafa	Independent	2,959	1.31
Salah Uddin Rimon	Independent	2,648	1.17
Total		225,643	100.00
Valid votes		225,643	99.46
Invalid/blank votes		1,216	0.54
Total votes		226,859	100.00
Registered voters/turnout		487,753	46.51

== Council election Results ==
=== Party-wise ===
2023 SCC council election results (party-wise)
Party	Seats		
Party	Ward Councilors	Reserved Women Councilors	Total Councilors
Bangladesh Awami League	30	11	41
Bangladesh Nationalist Party	8	1	9
Bangladesh Jamaat-e-Islami	4	2	6
Total	42	14	56

== See also ==
- 2023 elections in Bangladesh
