= Belayet Hossain Birbhumi =

Bangladeshi Islamic scholar (1887–1984)

Shams-ul-Ulama Belayet Hossain Birbhumi

Head Maulana of Calcutta Alia Madrasa
- In office 1942–1947
- Preceded by: Shams-ul-Ulama Muhammad Yahya Sasarami
- Succeeded by: Shafi Hujjatullah Ansari

Personal life
- Born: 1887 Birbhum district, Bengal Presidency
- Died: 9 December 1984 (aged 96–97) Dacca, Bangladesh
- Resting place: Hajibari Graveyard, Bangsal Thana, Dhaka
- Notable work: Al-Bitaqah

Religious life
- Religion: Islam
- Denomination: Sunni
- Jurisprudence: Hanafi

Muslim leader
- Students: Amimul Ehsan Barkati

Belayet Hossain Birbhumi (Bengali: বেলায়েত হোসেন বীরভূমী; 1887 — 9 December 1984) was a Bangladeshi Islamic scholar, author and academic. He served as a professor at the madrasas of Dhaka, Chittagong and Calcutta.

== Early life and education ==
Hossain was born in 1887 to a Bengali family of Muslim Syeds in the village of Saugram in Birbhum district, Bengal Presidency (now in West Bengal). His great-grandfather Syed Alauddin was a qadi under a local Pathan zamindar dynasty in Birbhum, whilst his grandfather Mir Muhammad Qabil served as a private tutor to the dynasty. His father, Syed Mesbahuddin Birbhumi, enrolled him at the Isha'atul Uloom madrasa in Mangalkot, where Hossain studied under the likes of Maulana Muhammad Mangalkoti. In 1905, he moved to Dacca for further studies, and even studied privately for some time with Maulana Mohammad Fazl-e-Karim Burdwani, former headteacher of Mohsinia Madrasa. He enrolled at the Mohsinia Madrasa in 1907 and passed from Jamat-e-Ula in 1909. After that, Hossain joined the Madrasah Alia at Rampur State in India. He studied under the likes of Maulana Muhammad Tayyab Arab Makki, Maulana Abdul Aziz, and Maulana Muhammad Amin. He studied ma'qulat with Maulana Fazl-e-Haq Rampuri and completed his Sihah-e-Sittah with Maulana Munawwar Ali. He graduated from this institution in 1913.

== Career ==
Birbhumi began his career on 1 May 1913 as a teacher at the Mohsinia Madrasa in Dhaka. He moved to Chittagong Madrasa in 1922, and briefly returned to Dhaka once again. Four years later, Birbhumi moved to Calcutta on 1 July 1926 and became an assistant maulvi at the Calcutta Alia Madrasa, eventually becoming a professor in the following year and its Head Maulana in 1942. Among his notable students were Maulana Ramzan Ali, Maulana Abdur Rahim Murshidabadi and Mufti Amimul Ehsan Barkati. In 1943, the British Raj awarded him the title of Shams-ul-Ulama for his contributions to education. Birbhumi worked in Calcutta all the way up until 16 June 1947, when he ultimately retired.

Following the Partition of Bengal, he moved to Dhaka. Birbhumi served as a Maulana at the Department of Islamic Studies at the University of Dacca for seven years after his retirement. In February 1964, Birbhumi was selected to be a member of the Islamic Advisory Council of the Dominion of Pakistan. He served in this role for two terms until 1969.

== Works ==
Birbhumi wrote several works in Arabic. Most notably, he is the author of Al-Bitaqah, a poetry book in praise of Prophet Muhammad. The work is studied at the postgraduate level at the Department of Arabic and Islamic Studies of the University of Dhaka.

== Death ==
Birbhumi died in Dhaka on 9 December 1984, leaving behind a son and daughter. He was buried at the Hajibari Graveyard next to Malibagh Mosque in Bangsal Thana.
