= Syad Muhammad Latif =

British Indian historian (1851–1902)

Syed Muhammad Latif Khan Bahadur Shams-ul-Ulema
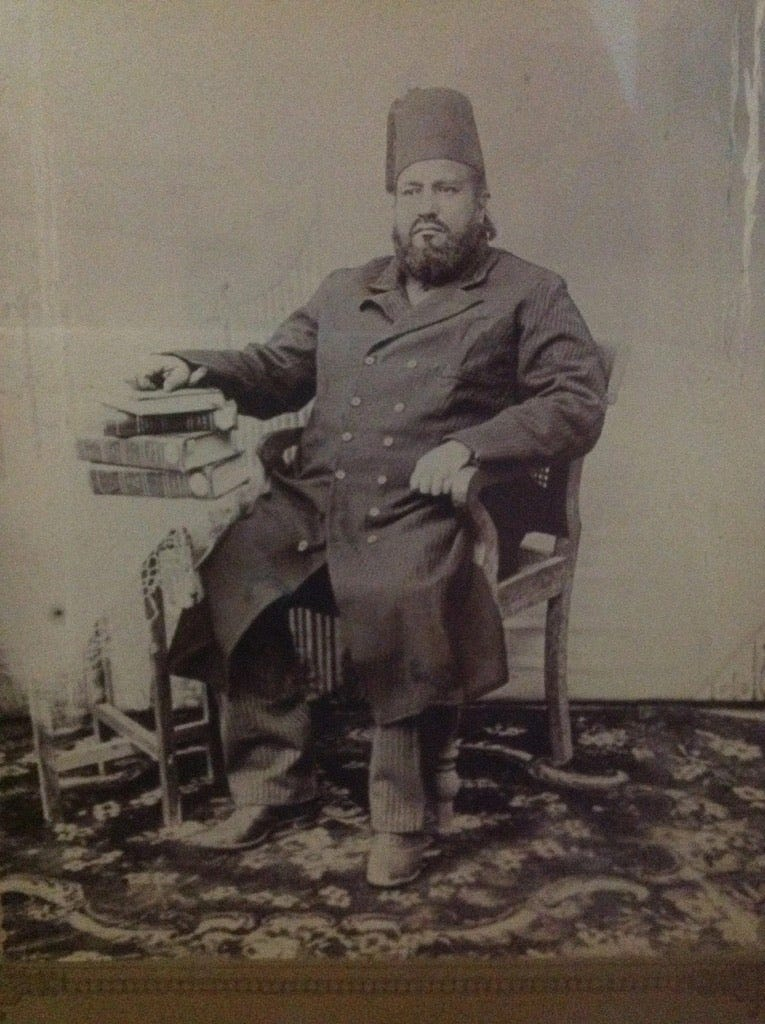
- Born: 1851; Lahore, British Punjab
- Died: 1902 (aged 51); Lahore
- Parent: Syed Muhammad Azeem

Academic background
- Education: Calcutta University
- Influences: Sir Syed Ahmed Khan

Academic work
- Era: 19th-century
- Main interests: History, Urdu poetry

Syed Muhammad Latif (1851–1902) was a 19th-century Punjabi scholar and historian. Due to his works on the history of Punjab, he is also known as the "Historian of the Punjab".

== Biography ==
Muhammad Latif was born at Lahore in 1851, two years after the annexation of Punjab into the British Raj following the Second Anglo-Sikh War. He belonged to an educated family – his father Syed Muhammad Azeem (1815–1885) founded The Lahore Chronicle in 1850, a pioneering English-language newspaper of British Punjab. Latif received a western-style education at Calcutta University which helped him to pursue a career in judiciary.

Latif started as a translator, and subsequently reader, in the Punjab Chief Court. He rose to the position of assistant commissioner of Hoshiarpur in 1880, and then also held the judicial charges of Lahore, Multan, Jalandhar, Gujranwala, Jhang and Gurdaspur, working in almost all notable places in Punjab. He was given the title of Khan Bahadur in 1892 as well as Shams-ul-Ulema in 1897 for his "History of the Punjab".

Latif was married to a niece of Syed Ahmed Khan in 1875.

== Academic career ==
Latif was a member of various associations, including Amjuman-i-Punjab and Bengal Asiatic Society. He was also a fellow of University of the Punjab, Lahore. He was a polyglot, and knew Punjabi, Arabic, Persian, English and Urdu.

== Works ==
Latif's Diwan was published in 1870. However, he is mainly known for his works on history. His Tarikh-i-Panjab Mah-halaat-i-Shar Lahore was published in 1888 in Urdu. Notable English works of Latif include:

- History of the Panjáb: From the Remotest Antiquity to the Present Time. Calcutta: Calcutta Central Press Company, Limited. 1891. OCLC 8385986.
- Lahore: Its History, Architectural Remains and Antiquities. Lahore: New Imperial Press. 1892. OCLC 28302540.
- Agra, Historical & Descriptive: With an Account of Akbar and His Court and of the Modern City of Agra. Calcutta: Calcutta Central Press Company, Limited. 1896. OCLC 15937007.
- Minhaj-ud-Din, Syed Muhammad, ed. (1963) [1891]. Early History of Multan (second ed.). Lahore: People's Publishing House. OCLC 28302543.

== Sources ==
- Shafique, Muhammad (2018). "Syed Muhammad Latif: A Pioneer Man of Regional Historiography of Punjab" (PDF). Journal of Indian Studies. 4 (1). Lahore: University of the Punjab: 7–15. ISSN 2520-7288.
- Alam, Humera (1987). "S. M. Latif – A Pioneer Muslim Scholar in the Field of History, Archaeology & Architecture". The Proceedings of the Hijra Celebration Symposium on Islamic Art, Calligraphy, Architecture and Archaeology, March 1–6, 1981. 2 (2). Peshawar: University of Peshawar: 347–359. OCLC 24824620.
- Kaur, Dr Daljit (2024). "Revisiting Sikh history through prism of Persian Chronicles". International Journal of Innovative Research in Technology. 11 (6): 511–515. ISSN 2349-6002.
