= Mādayān ī Hazār Dādestān =

- Author: Farroxmard i Wahrāmān
- Language: Middle Persian
- Subject: Legal treatise

Mādayān ī Hazār Dādestān (Book of a Thousand Judgements) is a significant primary document concerning the social and institutional history of Sasanian Iran and the only entirely legal treatise on pre-Islamic Sasanian jurisprudence to have survived from the Zoroastrian era. Unlike subsequent Pahlavi books of the 9th and 10th centuries, which combined juridical and religious themes, the Hazār Dādestān focuses solely on legal questions, in contrast to all other known sources on Zoroastrian and Sasanian law.

The manuscript was given to the Hataria Library by Maneckji Limji Hataria, and it was made available to the West through J. J. Modi's facsimile in 1901.

== Author ==
Farroxmard i Wahrāmān, a jurist or theologian, compiled the Hazār Dādestān sometime after the 26th year of Khosrow II's reign. He lived in the first part of the 7th century, was well-versed in legal jargon, had intimate knowledge of the Sasanian legal system, and had access to court documents based on the content of the Hazār Dādestān and its legal terminology.

According to Farroxmard, the Hazār Dādestān served as a tool for the creator's "supernatural power", eradicating liars and establishing ultimate sovereignty. Those who have attained "eternal prosperity" and "a share of the immortal" are considered the most blessed. To achieve this, one can absolve themselves of sin, acknowledge their own religious obligation to uphold the three fundamental commandments (good thought, speech, and deed), and maintain purity by righteousness.

The Hazār Dādestān is the only pre-Islamic Persian legal work to have survived the Muslim conquest of Persia.

== Contents ==
The Hazār Dādestān is not a codex; rather, it is an extensive collection of real and imagined case histories gathered from court transcripts and records, testaments, different works on jurisprudence, jurists' commentary, direct quotes from the most eminent authorities in the field, and a plethora of other long-lost documents.

The Hazār Dādestān is a secular compilation that makes no reference to religious issues and presents legal issues solely from a legal standpoint. Even matters concerning Zoroastrian church-affiliated religious institutions, like charitable endowments, fire foundations, and pious gifts, are only examined from a legal perspective. Two passages in the Hazār Dādestān mention the Avesta; however, the context clearly indicates that the Pahlavi commentary, and not the original text, is intended in both sentences, since the issues discussed in this context clearly come from late Sasanian jurisprudence.

The Hazār Dādestān gives the impression that by the end of the Sasanian era, jurisprudence had become a separate discipline, despite the fact that many of the most well-known jurists cited in the Law-Book—like Sōšans, Mēdōmāh, and Abarag—were also theologians and are recognized to us as the writers of Avesta commentaries. As in all ancient communities, religion and law coexisted, but by the end of the Sasanian period, the Sasanian legal system had grown so complex that it was necessary to keep theological speculation mostly apart from legal matters. The Madayan also makes it abundantly evident that legal theory (čāštag), which is based on the writings of jurists, has already begun to diverge from the day-to-day administration of justice in the courts (kardag), creating a gulf between theoretical concerns and workable solutions.

Many examples of Aramaic legal terminology, either in Aramogram or translated into Pahlavi, are included throughout the Hazār Dādestān.

The Hazār Dādestān contains relatively little information about non-Zoroastrians' standing in Sasanian courts, and what little is available focuses mostly on questions of marriage, servitude, and conversion.

The Hazār Dādestān, besides being a legal treatise, provides numerous examples of the type of financial market that existed in Sasanid Iran. These are mostly discussed in relation to loans, debts, credits, interest rates, and penalties, as well as the related legal rights of possession and transfer of property. Eight of the Madayan's 37 remaining chapters deal specifically with debts and how they are settled, and five other chapters which address land ownership, inheritance, marriage, and the status of married and single women also cover debt.

=== Chapter topics ===
- Chap. 5 " On offences and penalties and the obstruction of justice."(No heading; fragmentary.)
- Chap. *6 “On the activity of the advocate.”
- Chap. 7 “On the plaintiff.”
- Chap. 16 Fragmented: legal standing of slave-born offspring, manumission of slaves under the ownership of many masters, fire slaves and fire servants, and the buying and selling of slaves; status following Zoroastrian conversion
- Chap. 17 Regarding debt release for partners, co-holders, and co-sureties
- Chap. 18 On agreements and disagreements with decisions made by the heads of the estates
- Chapter 19 Concerns the dissolution of marriage.
- Chap. 20 “On the auctor"(a technical term corresponding exactly to the specific meaning of auctor in ancient Roman law. Both expressions designate the former proprietor of an object who has the obligation to defend the party who acquired the object from him in court against the claim of a third party; see Macuch, 1988.)
- Chap. 21 “On the distortion (of statements) and other offences.”
- Chap. 22 “On obstruction” (azišmānd, a technical term designating 1. generally, the act of obstructing another person in his rights; 2. specifically, the obstruction of justice, i.e., failure to follow court summons, refusal to take an oath, making contradictory statements in court, causing the delay of legal proceedings, etc.; see Macuch, 1993, pp. 121 ff.).
- Chap. 23 “On payment of debts to be discharged from the family (property) and those (debts) liable to claim on the part of the family."
- Chap. 24 On donations, including the donatio mortis causa and the interpretation of certain clauses in the statements of the donors (No heading, fragmentary.)
- Chap. 25 “On the intermediary successor, ‘who [succeeds] him afterwards.”
- Chap. 26 “On guardianship.”
- Chap. 27 “On pledging the substance of a property (= mortgage, āgraw); whether a payment in advance (pēštōzišnīh) is licit or illicit.”
- Chap. 28 “On nourishing and supporting (xwarišn ud dārišn) one person by another (= on maintenance).”
- Chap. 29 “On the foundation providing religious services; on property endowed for the fire and property endowed for the soul."
- Chap. 30 “On the marriage of a wife with ‘full rights’."
- Chap. 32 On the exchange of goods. (No heading, fragmentary.)
- Chap. 33 “On the anticresis"(denotes pledging the right of usufruct of a property [as opposed to pledging the substance].)
- Chap. 37 (No heading, fragmentary.)
- Chap. 38 “On the payment (of debts) on the part of partners and co-holders.”
- Chap. 39 “On half a share and the value of an object for which an agreement/contract has been made.”
- Chap. 40 “On co-surety, surety, and partnership.”
- Chap. 41 “On inherited possessions."
- Chap. 42 “On declaring someone as the owner (of a certain object)."
- Chap. 43 “On (declaring) acceptance (of a donation) and approval of the (donor’s) will.”
- Chap. *44 (No heading, fragmentary.)
- Chap. 45 “On compensation and the payment of a fine; pious gifts and the incapability to fulfil an agreement and a contract.”
- Chap. 46 “On rent” (Fragmentary).
- Chap. 48: The Hazār Dādestān discusses atarsagahih or disobedience in this chapter, which describes the laws pertaining to disobedient spouses, children, and slaves, with a primary emphasis on the pecuniary consequences of such actions. Yaakov Elman, professor of Talmud at Yeshiva University's Bernard Revel Graduate School of Jewish Studies, drew attention to the similarities between Persian and rabbinic institutions, pointing out that rabbinic literature shares a description and punishment for disobedient wives.

== Zoroastrian magi ==
According to the Hazār Dādestān, Zoroastrian priests, in particular the mobadan mobad issued decrees using his own seal. It was understood that the mobadan mobad did so "according to the words of the King of Kings".

== Exposure to the West ==
The Mādayān ī hazār dādestān has shown to be extremely valuable for understanding the social history of the Sasanian era. Maneckji Limji Hataria gave the manuscript to the Hataria Library, and it was subsequently made available to the West through J. J. Modi's facsimile edition in 1901.

Alberto Cantera, professor of Iranian studies, theorizes that other legal treatises have not survived, most likely because a collection like the Hazār Dādestān took over the legal authoritative position and they lost their usage during the Islamization of Sasanid Iran.

== Sources ==
- Cantera, Alberto (2022). "On the Edge between Literacy and Orality: Manuscripts and Performance of the Zoroastrian Long Liturgy". Oral Tradition. 35 (Oct) (2): 211–250.
- Kotwal, Firoze M.; Choksy, Jamsheed K.; Brunner, Christopher J.; Moazami, Mahnaz (2016). "Hataria, Manekji Limji". Encyclopaedia Iranica.
- Libson, Ayelet Hoffmann (2018). Law and Self-Knowledge in the Talmud. Cambridge University Press.
- Macuch, Maria (2005). "Mādayān ī Hazār Dādestān". Encyclopaedia Iranica.
- Mokhtarian, Jason Sion (2015). The Culture of the Talmud in Ancient Iran. University of California Press.
- Rezakhani, Khodadad; Morony, Michael G. (2014). "Markets for Land, Labour and Capital in Late Antique Iraq, AD 200-700". Journal of the Economic and Social History of the Orient. 57 (2): 231–261.
- Shaked, S. (1990). "Administrative Functions of Priests in the Sasanian Period". In Gnoli, G.; Panaino, A. (eds.). Proceedings of the First European Conference of Iranian Studies, Held in Turin, September 7th-11th, 1987 by the SocietasIranologica Europea, part 1. Instituto Italiano per Medio ed Estremo Oriente. pp. 261–273.
- Sharafi, Mitra (2014). Law and Identity in Colonial South Asia: Parsi Legal Culture, 1772–1947. Cambridge University Press.
- Sheikh, Hossein (2023). Studies of Bactrian Legal Documents. Brill.
- Stausberg, Michael; Karanjia, Ramiyar P. (2013). "Modi, Jivanji Jamshedji". Encyclopaedia Iranica.
