= Jivanji Jamshedji Modi =

Sir Ervad Jivanji Jamshedji Modi (1854–1933), who also carried the title of Shams-ul-Ulama, was a prominent Zoroastrian Parsi-Indian priest, scholar and community leader in Bombay. One of "the most decorated priests in history", he wrote over 70 books, produced over 120 scholarly papers on Zoroastrian history, traveled and researched into Zoroastrian affairs extensively and was instrumental in organizing the Parsi community in India. During his lifetime he had been called "the greatest living authority on the ancient history and customs of the Parsis." He created a facsimile edition of the Middle Persian legal treatise, Mādayān ī Hazār Dādestān in 1901.

== Books ==
- The Religious Ceremonies and Customs of the Parsees (1922)
- My Travels Outside Bombay (written in Gujarati (1926)

== Honors and awards ==
- B.A. (Bombay University, 1876)
- Fellow of the University of Bombay (1887)
- Dip. Litteris et Artibus (Sweden, 1889)
- Shams-ul-Ulama (Government of British India, 1893)
- Officier d'Academie (France, 1898)
- Officier de l'Instruction Publique (France, 1903)
- Ph.D. (Honoris Causa, Heidelberg, 1912)
- Honorary Correspondent of the Archaeological Department of the Government of India (1914)
- C.I.E. (1917); Campbell Medalist, B.B., Royal Asiatic Society (1918)
- Honorary Member of the Bhandarkar Oriental Research Institute (1923)
- Chevalier de Légion d'honneur (France, 1925)
- Officier de Croix de Merit (Hungary, 1925)
- British Knighthood (1930)
- LL.D. (Honoris Causa, Bombay University 1931)
