= Lahore Chronicle =

- Founded: 1849
- Language: English language
- Headquarters: Lahore, British India

Lahore Chronicle was newspaper founded in 1849 in Lahore, British India. It is the first newspaper to be published in modern Pakistan. It founded by Syed Muhammad Azim, father of historian Syad Muhammad Latif.
