= Wards of Sylhet City Corporation =

Local electoral subdivisions

Sylhet City Corporation, that governs the Sylhet city in Bangladesh is divided into wards. As of 2022, it has 42 wards. The city was changed from a municipal board to a city corporation in 2001. As of June 2023, the total number of voters in the 42 wards of Sylhet City Corporation is 486,605.

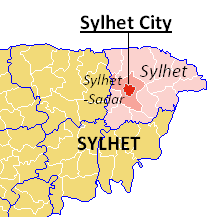
Sylhet_City_Map

== Wards ==
=== Ward 1 ===
Councillor: Syed Tawfiqul Hadi

- Dargah Mahalla
- Dargah Gate
- Miah Fazil Chist
- Rajargali

=== Ward 2 ===
Councillor: Bikram Kor Shomrat

- Dariapara
- Kazi Elias
- Saraspur
- Zindabazar (part)

=== Ward 3 ===
Councillor: A K A Layek

- Kajal Shah
- Keyapara
- Munshipara
- Subidbazar
- Police Line Area

=== Ward 4 ===
Councilor: Sheikh Tofail Ahmed Shapul

- Ambarkhana (part)
- Dattapara
- Housing Estate
- Mazumdari
- Darshan Deury

Ward 5

Councilor missing

- Ambarkhana (part)
- Borobazar

=== Ward 6 ===
Councillor: Shah Alom

- Chowkidekhi
- Elashkandi
- Syed Mugni
- Badam Bagicha

=== Ward 7 ===
Councillor: Sayeed Mohammad Abdullah

- Jalalabad Residential Area
- Pir Moholla
- Bon Kalapara
- Fazil Chisht Residential Area
- Mitali Residential Area

=== Ward 8 ===
Councilor: Muhammad Ilyasur Rahman

- Londoni Road
- Brahmman Sashan
- Hawaldarpara
- Pathantula (part)
- Kalibari

=== Ward 9 ===
Councilor: Haji Muhammad Muqlisur Rahman Kamran

- Lake City Residential Area
- Akhalia
- Baghbari
- Nehari Para
- Pathantula (part)
- Sagardighir Par

=== Ward 10 ===
Councillor: Mst. Ruhena Khanom Mukta

- Shamimabad
- Kanishail
- Kalapara
- Majumder Para
- Mollapara
- Nabab Road
- Wapda

=== Ward 11 ===
Councillor: Mr. Abdur Rakib Bablu

- Bhatalia
- Noyapara
- Bil Par
- Dokkhin Kajalshah
- Laldighirpar
- Madhu Shahid

=== Ward 12 ===
Councillor: Muhammad Sikandar Ali

- Bhangatikar
- Kuarpar
- Sheikhghat

=== Ward 13 ===
Councillor: missing

- Taltala
- Mirza Jangal
- Ramer Dighirpar
- Sheikhpara
- Lamabazar

=== Ward 14 ===
Councillor: Nazrul Islam Munim

- Bandar Bazar
- Chalibandar
- Dhopadighir Par (part)
- Jallarpar
- Jamtala
- Kastoghar
- Kamalgarh
- Laldighirpar
- Mirza Jangal
- Taltala (part)
- Zindabazar (part)

=== Ward 15 ===
Councillor: Saifur Amin (Baker)

- Baruthkhana
- Jail Road
- Jatarpur
- Naiorpool
- Nayapara
- Subhanighat
- Dhopadighir Par (part)
- Zindabazar (part)
- Banderbazar (part)

=== Ward 16 ===
Councillor: Abdul Muhit Javed

- Charadighir Par
- Dhopadighir Par (part)
- Hawapara
- Zindabazar (part)
- Nayasarak
- Saodagar Tola

=== Ward 17 ===
Councillor: Rashed Ahmed

- Kazitula
- Manikpir Tila
- Loharpara
- Electric Supply (part)
- Ambarkhana (part)
- Mirboxtula
- Chowhatta
- Shahi Eidgah Area (part)

=== Ward 18 ===
Councillor: A B M Zillur Rahman

- Jer Jeri Para
- Kumarpara
- Mirabazar
- Shakhari Para
- Shahi Eidgah Area (part)

=== Ward 19 ===
Councillor: S M Shawkat Amin Tawhid

- Chandanitola
- Daptaripara
- Dargibanda
- Dargipara

=== Ward 20 ===
Councillor: Missing

- Shibganj
- Tilagar (part)
- Bhatatikor Residential Area
- Lakripara

=== Ward 21 ===
Councillor: Abdur Rokib Tuhin

- Lamapara
- Sonarpara
- Hatimbug
- Shaplabagh Residential Area
- Tilagar (part)
- Rajpara

=== Ward 22 ===
Councillor: Fazle Rabbi Chowdhury

- Shahjalal Upashahar

=== Ward 23 ===
Councillor: Mostak Ahmed

- Masimpur
- Mendibag

=== Ward 24 ===
Councillor: Suhin Ahmed

- Kushighat
- Mirapara
- Sadarpara
- Tultikar
- Sobujbag

=== Ward 25 ===
Councillor: Takbir Islam Pinto

- Khojarkhala
- Barokhola
- Lawai (part)
- Daudpur (part)
- Kazirkhola

=== Ward 26 ===
Councillor: Mohammad Taufiq Baksh

- Kadamtoli
- Mominkhola
- Bhartakola
- khujarkola

=== Ward 27 ===
Councilor: Abdul Jolil Nazrul

- Gotatikor
- Alampur

=== Ward 28 ===
Councillor: A K M Abdullah

- Boroikandi

=== Ward 29 ===
Councillor Missing

- Kadamtoli (part)
- Technical Road
- Bongobir Road

=== Ward 30 ===
Councillor missing

- Chandai
- Jainpur
- Bakshipur
- Nazarpur

== See also ==
- Sylhet
- Sylhet District
- Sylhet Division
