= Ambarkhana =

Ambarkhana আম্বরখানা
- Neighborhood
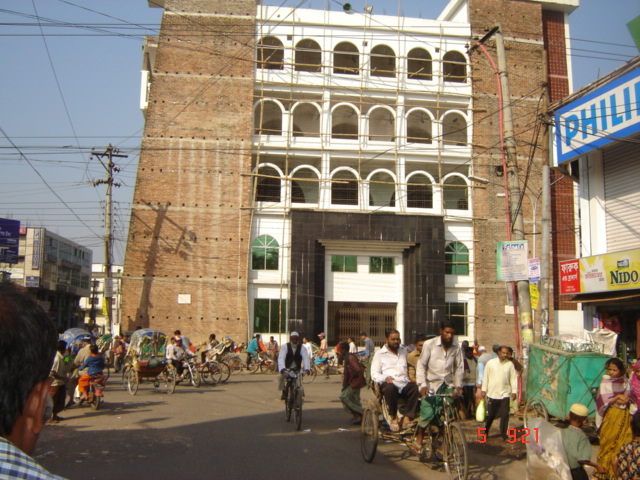
- Street view of the Ambarkhana district in Sylhet.
- Interactive map of Ambarkhana
- Coordinates: 24°54′19″N 91°52′18″E
- Country: Bangladesh
- Administrative Divisions: Division: Sylhet Division; District: Sylhet District; City Corp: Sylhet City Corporation

Government
  - Councillor (Ward 1): Syed Tawfiqul Hadi
- Postal code: 3100
- Area code: +880 821

Ambarkhana (Bengali: আম্বরখানা) is an entry gateway, prominent commercial district, and administrative sector (Ward No. 1) situated in the northern jurisdiction of Sylhet City Corporation, Bangladesh. Recognized as one of the densest economic neighborhoods in the city, Ambarkhana revolves around a historically significant four-way intersection. It is directly adjacent to the globally recognized Shah Jalal Dargah religious precinct along its southern frontier.

== History and Etymology ==
The toponymy of "Ambarkhana" stems directly from Persian linguistic roots widely introduced during early administrative periods in the region. The word Ambar corresponds historically to a centralized storage facility, granary, or treasury repository, while Khana signifies a designated building or estate house.

During the Mughal Empire rule over the Bengal Subah and through the subsequent British Raj colonial administration, the northern sectors of Sylhet functioned as a strategic collection outpost. The area of Ambarkhana housed the primary imperial storehouses utilized for compiling regional tax collections, agricultural grain revenues, and logistics supplies before being redistributed down the Surma River transit channels. As administrative systems modernized over the 19th and 20th centuries, the historical military and revenue outpost evolved into an outdoor public bazaar, systematically giving way to high-density commercial developments and urbanization.

== Geography and Topography ==
Ambarkhana is geographically positioned within the northeastern alluvial plains of Bangladesh, characterized by low-lying elevations with intermittent surrounding hillocks locally known as tilas. The neighborhood serves as a buffer zone between the urban density of central Sylhet and the expansive tea cultivation estates stretching out towards the north.

The micro-climate of Ambarkhana follows the tropical monsoon characteristics of the broader Sylhet basin, experiencing some of the highest annual precipitation levels across South Asia. The surrounding terrain boasts rich, acidic soil properties optimal for tea production, which is physically apparent immediately up the northern corridors of the intersection.

== Transportation and Grid Infrastructure ==
The Ambarkhana Point serves as a vital arterial crossroad connecting intra-city traffic to regional transport networks across the broader Sylhet Division. The junction links four highly critical regional thoroughfares:

The Southern Corridor: Direct thoroughfare leading into the central business districts of Zindabazar, Chouhatta, and the historic architectural complexes of the Shah Jalal Dargah.

The Northern Airport Highway: Routes commuters directly toward the Hazrat Shahjalal International Airport transit links, while dissecting the iconic Malnicherra Tea Estate.

The Western Trunk Route: Provides direct highway accessibility toward Sunamganj District and regional rural sectors.

The Eastern Link: Connects the traffic grid directly toward the historic Shahi Eidgah monument and urban residential wards.

The node is inherently prone to traffic saturation, heavily utilized by non-motorized transport vehicles, thousands of auto-rickshaws, city buses, and heavy inter-district transport vehicles moving freight across northern Bangladesh.

== Commercial Landmarks and Economy ==
The neighborhood serves as a primary financial pillar for Sylhet City Corporation, hosting clusters of national commercial banks, corporate offices, specialized electronics retailers, and sprawling wholesale consumer marketplaces.

=== Religious and Architectural Features ===
Ambarkhana Central Jame Mosque: This structural landmark is situated squarely at the core intersection. It accommodates thousands of daily worshippers and incorporates modern elements like climate-controlled prayer halls, serving as a primary visual landmark for the area.

Moneem Complex and Retail Hubs: Notable multi-story commercial infrastructure projects line the streets, supporting localized commercial enterprise and catering to the region's prominent non-resident Bangladeshi (NRB) diaspora population.

=== Proximity to Tea Tourism ===
Directly flanking the northern periphery along the airport motorway is the entrance to the Malnicherra Tea Estate. Established under British corporate pioneers in the year 1854, Malnicherra holds historical significance as the very first commercial operational tea plantation in South Asia, drawing ecotourism revenue straight through Ambarkhana's hospitality businesses.

== Education and Civic Facilities ==
The educational infrastructure inside Ward No. 1 supports an extensive student population through historic institutions:

1. Ambarkhana Girls' School and College: A prominent regional institution providing primary through higher secondary education specifically focused on broadening female enrollment across the municipality. The institution lands occupy an extensive 1.50-acre urban campus.
2. Cambridge Grammar School & College: Represents private education facilities in the area utilizing English-medium international curricula.

== See also ==
- Sylhet City Corporation
- List of neighborhoods in Sylhet
- History of Sylhet
