= Atiquzzaman Khan =

Bangladeshi journalist (1921–1983)

- আতিকুজ্জামান খান

Deputy High Commissioner of Bangladesh in Kolkata, India
- In office 24 April 1976 – 31 July 1979
- Preceded by: Abdus Sobhan Khan
- Succeeded by: Harun-ur-Rashid

Chairman of the Department of Journalism, University of Dhaka
- In office 2 August 1962 – 31 January 1972
- Preceded by: position established
- Succeeded by: Q. A. I. M. Nuruddin

Personal details
- Born: 1921 Calcutta, British India
- Died: 10 March 1983 (aged 61–62) Calcutta, India
- Relations: A. T. M. Mustafa (brother)
- Education: PhD (journalism)
- Alma mater: London School of Journalism
- Occupation: Professor, journalist, sports commentator
- Awards: Tamgha-e-Khidmat

Atiquzzaman Khan (1921–1983) was a Bangladeshi sports journalist, cricketer, professor, sports commentator, radio artist, and diplomat.

== Early life and education ==
Atiquzzaman Khan was born in 1921 in Calcutta, British India. His father, Khan Bahadur Adiluzzaman Khan, was a government official and a member of the Bengal Civil Service. Their ancestral home was in Dadrokhi village, Manikganj subdivision, Dacca District, Bengal Presidency, British India (present-day Harirampur Upazila, Manikganj District, Bangladesh). His grandfather Adalat Khan was a maulvi who served as a professor of Oriental languages at Fort William College. Lawyer and cricketer A. T. M. Mustafa was his brother. After studying at Calcutta Madrasah, he enrolled at Presidency College in 1936. Two years later, he passed the Intermediate of Arts examination, and another two years later he obtained a bachelor's degree in history. He then earned a master's degree in history from the University of Calcutta in 1943, followed by a diploma in journalism from the London School of Journalism in 1950. In 1966, he went to London on a scholarship of British Council to pursue a PhD in journalism.

== Playing career ==
While at Presidency College and the University of Calcutta, Khan captained the cricket teams of both institutions for three years. He played in Lahore as captain of the Combined Universities XI against Lord Tennyson's XI. He also represented the Bengal cricket team in the Ranji Trophy. In 1958, he joined Mohammedan SC. He later served as chairman of the cricket committee of the East Pakistan Sports Federation and as a member of the executive committee of the Board of Control for Cricket of Pakistan.

== Career ==
In 1935, he began working as a cricket news reporter. He started his career in journalism in 1940. In British India, he worked from Calcutta for several newspapers, including The Statesman, Amrita Bazar Patrika, Hindustan Standard, and Star of India. After the partition of India in 1947, he moved to Dacca, Pakistan. He subsequently served as assistant editor and joint editor of The Morning News and as feature editor of The Pakistan Observer. In 1962, he was appointed as a reader and founder-head of the Department of Journalism at the University of Dacca. In the same year, he became founder-president of the East Pakistan Sports Writers' Association. During the Bangladesh Liberation War in 1971, he opposed the war. After the independence of Bangladesh, in 1973 the university administration took action against him for opposing the independence and placed him on compulsory leave. However, in the same year, the government of Bangladesh declared a general amnesty for those who had opposed the Liberation War.

== Later life, death and legacy ==
In 1976, the government appointed Khan as deputy high commissioner in Calcutta, India, where he served for nearly three years. he continued teaching at the University of Dacca until his death. A few months after traveling to Calcutta for medical treatment, he died of a heart attack at a clinic there on 10 March 1983. He was buried at his family's cemetery in Calcutta. He was awarded the Tamgha-e-Khidmat by the government of Pakistan, which he renounced during the 1969 East Pakistan mass uprising. The journalism department's library at the University of Dacca was named after Khan, but in 2016 it was renamed after journalist Syed Nazmul Haque.

== Works ==
- Press in East Pakistan: A Study in Content Analysis
- Dream Image
- The Day Begins
- Principles of Journalism
- Maiden Over
- My Country
