= A. T. M. Mustafa =

East-Pakistani politician

Federal Minister of Pakistan
- In office 1964–1965
- President: Ayub Khan
- Ministry: Education
- Preceded by: A.K.M. Fazlul Quader Chowdhury
- Succeeded by: Kazi Anwarul Haque
- In office 1963–1964
- President: Ayub Khan
- Ministry: Information and Broadcasting
- Preceded by: Ayub Khan
- Succeeded by: Abdul Waheed Khan

Provincial Minister of East Pakistan
- In office 1962–1963
- Governor: Ghulam Faruque Khan; Abdul Monem Khan
- Ministry: Law, Broadcasting and Information
- Succeeded by: Abdul Hye Choudhury

Personal details
- Born: Abu Tayyab Mohammad Mustafa; 1925 Calcutta, Bengal Presidency, British India
- Died: 8 January 1966 (aged 40–41) Havana, Cuba
- Resting place: Azimpur graveyard
- Party: Independent
- Relations: Atiquzzaman Khan (brother); Safiullah Dadaji (maternal grandfather)
- Education: Bachelor of Laws
- Alma mater: Aligarh Muslim University; Lincoln's Inn
- Occupation: Barrister
- Nickname: Abu Mustafa
- Cricket career

Cricket information
- Role: Batsman

Domestic team information
- Years: Team
- 1956: East Pakistan

Career statistics
Competition	First-class
Matches	1
Runs scored	6
Batting average	3.00
100s/50s	0/0
Top score	5
Catches/stumpings	0/-
- Source: CricketArchive, 26 June 2013

Abu Tayyab Mohammad Mustafa (Bengali: আবু তৈয়ব মোহাম্মদ মোস্তফা, Urdu: ابو طیب محمد مصطفی) was a Pakistani lawyer, politician and cricketer.

== Early life ==
Mustafa was born in 1925 in Calcutta, Bengal Presidency, British India (present-day Kolkata, West Bengal, India), into the family of Islamic scholar Abul Khayer. Islamic teacher Safiullah Dadaji was his maternal grandfather. He was one of six brothers and one sister, including sports commentator Atiquzzaman Khan. Mustafa received his early education at Calcutta Madrasah. He later completed his higher secondary education at Islamia College, Calcutta, and went on to obtain a Bachelor of Laws and a master's degree with honours in Geography from Aligarh Muslim University. During his student life, Mustafa served as vice-president of the Aligarh Muslim University Students' Union from 1946 to 1947. Afterward, while pursuing studies in Grrat Britain, he became president of the Pakistan National Students Association.

== Career ==
=== Legal career ===
While in Britain, he was called to the Bar at Lincoln's Inn. He emigrated to East Bengal of the dominion of Pakistan in 1950 and began his legal career as an advocate at the Dacca High Court. Seven years later, he started practising at the Supreme Court of Pakistan. During his career, he served as a part-time professor of law at the University of Dacca, standing counsel to the federal government in East Pakistan, and legal adviser to the State Bank of Pakistan in Dacca (present-day Dhaka, Bangladesh) and the East Pakistan Agricultural Development Corporation. He also served as vice-president of the East Pakistan High Court Bar Association.

=== Sporting career ===
Mustafa first played for the side in the 1952–53 season, when the East Pakistan cricket team took part in two matches against the Pakistan national cricket team. He was a right-handed batsman. His only first-class match was played in January 1956 against the touring Marylebone Cricket Club, led by Donald Carr, at the Chittagong Stadium. In that match, Mustafa captained the East Pakistan team. However, he was unsuccessful as a batsman, failing to reach double figures in either innings. The team also performed poorly and, after being forced to follow on, lost by an innings and 101 runs. Mustafa did not play any further first-class matches thereafter.

He served as vice-president of Mohammedan Sporting Club and Victoria Sporting Club, and was a member of the Dacca Improvement Trust and the organisational committee of the East Pakistan Sports Federation. While serving as president of the Pakistan Sports Board, he increased financial allocations to the stadium committee of the East Pakistan Sports Federation. During his tenure, a rule was introduced requiring that, when any Pakistani sports team travelled abroad for plays, half of the officials would be selected from East Pakistan and the other half from West Pakistan. Additionally, under his directive, the Pakistan Olympic Association adopted a rule to include half of its representatives from East Pakistan.

=== Political career ===
In 1962, he was elected vice-president of the Asian-African Legal Consultative Committee. In the same year, he was inducted into the Faruque cabinet and was given charge of the Ministry of Law, Publicity and Information for East Pakistan. That same year, he was appointed parliamentary leader of the East Pakistan Provincial Assembly. He held both political responsibilities for one year. In 1963, during the presidency of Ayub Khan, Mustafa served for one year as Pakistan's information and broadcasting minister, and in 1964 he became education minister for a year.

== Family, death and legacy ==
In 1959, he married a daughter of Nawabzada Fazle Rabbi of Shaistabad, Barisal. The couple had no children.

On 8 January 1966, he travelled to Havana, Cuba, as deputy leader of the state delegation to attend the Tricontinental Conference, led by Abdul Hamid Khan Bhashani. He died of cardiac arrest while delivering a speech at the conference.

On 14 January 1966, his body was repatriated from Havana to Dhaka via Karachi. After lying briefly at his residence in Dhanmondi, funeral prayers were held at the Outer Stadium Ground. He was subsequently buried beside his father's grave at Azimpur graveyard.

In the same year, several sporting events were established in his memory, including the Mustafa Memorial Cricket Cup, the A. T. M. Mustafa Football Trophy, and the A. T. M. Mustafa Memorial Badminton Shield Tournament.
