= Shamsul Ulama =

Shamsul Ulama (Arabic: شمس العلماء "sun of the scholars") is a religious title that has been taken by or granted to various individuals in India including:

- Maulana Zahoor ul Hussain Farooqui Rampuri, ex Principal of Madrasa Alia Rampur
- Shibli Nomani (1857–1914)
- Maulana Nizamuddeen Allahabadi ex Principle Madarasa Alia Rampur
- Shah Badruddin (1852–after 1920)
- Jivanji Jamshedji Modi (1854–1933), Zoroastrian priest
- Khwaja Kamaluddin Ahmad, first Muslim principal of Calcutta Alia Madrasa
- Safiullah Sarhadi (1870–1948), Islamic preacher, philosopher and teacher
- Abu Nasr Waheed (1878–1953), Bengali Islamic scholar and government minister
- Majid Ali Jaunpuri (died 1935), Indian Islamic scholar and rationalist thinker
- Quazi Shamsuddeen Jaunpuri, writher of Qanoon e Shariat
- Belayet Hossain Birbhumi (1887–1984), Bangladeshi Islamic scholar and author
- Ahmed Ali Enayetpuri (1898–1959), Bengali Islamic schoar, politician and journalist
- Abdul Latif Chowdhury Fultali (1913–2008), Bangladeshi Islamic scholar and author
- E. K. Aboobacker Musliar (1914–1996), leader of Kerala Muslims
- Mohammad Abdul Jalil Usmani, 1897, Professor Arabic and Persian, Religious scholar.
