= Anwaruzzaman Chowdhury =

3rd Mayor of Sylhet

- আনোয়ারুজ্জামান চৌধুরী
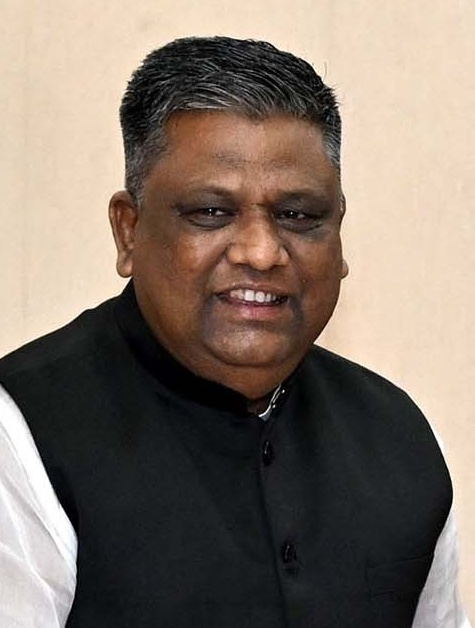
- Chowdhury in 2023

3rd Mayor of Sylhet
- In office 7 November 2023 – 19 August 2024
- Preceded by: Ariful Haque Choudhury
- Succeeded by: Abu Ahmad Siddiqui; as Administrator

Personal details
- Born: 1 June 1970 (age 56) Osmaninagar, Sylhet, East Pakistan
- Party: Bangladesh Awami League
- Spouse: Holy Begum Chowdhury
- Children: 3
- Education: BA (Hons)

Anwaruzzaman Chowdhury (Bengali: আনোয়ারুজ্জামান চৌধুরী; born 1 June 1970) is a Bangladeshi politician. He was the mayor of Sylhet City Corporation.

== Early life ==
Anwaruzzaman, born on June 1, 1970, hails from Osmaninagar in the Sylhet district. His father was Nousha Miah Chowdhury and his mother is Gahinunnesa Chowdhury. Anwaruzzaman currently resides in the Pathantula area of Sylhet Sadar. He spent a considerable duration living in London.

In 1978, Anwaruzzaman enrolled at West Tillapara Government Primary School. He pursued his studies at Sylhet Government College from 1988 to 1990, ultimately attaining a Bachelor of Arts (Honours) degree.

== Political career ==
Anwaruzzaman is joint general secretary of the UK unit of Awami League.

On 21 June 2023, he was elected mayor in Sylhet City Corporation elections. On 19 August 2024, mayors of 12 city corporations of the country, including Sylhet, were removed and administrators were appointed.

After the fall of the Sheikh Hasina led Awami League government, Chowdhury's home in Sylhet was vandalized in April 2025. Homes of other Awami League and Bangladesh Chattra League leaders were vandalized as well in Sylhet.
