= Muin-ud-din Ahmad Khan =

Bangladeshi historian (1926–2021)

- Born: April 18, 1926; Chittagong, Bangladesh
- Died: March 28, 2021 (aged 94)

Academic background
- Education: University of Dhaka, McGill University

Academic work
- Institutions: University of Chittagong
- Notable works: Origin and Development of Experimental Science: Encounter with the Modern West

Muin-ud-din Ahmad Khan (April 18, 1926 - March 28, 2021) was a Bangladeshi historian, and professor of Islamic history and culture at the University of Chittagong. He served as the founder Vice-chancellor of Southern University Bangladesh and the first Director General of Islamic Foundation Bangladesh.

== Biography ==
=== Early life and education ===
Muinuddin Ahmad Khan was born on April 18, 1926, in the village of Chunti in Lohagara upazila of Chittagong. He passed madrasa in 1945 and completed higher secondary education in 1948. He then enrolled in the Department of Islamic Studies at the University of Dhaka and obtained his bachelor's and master's degrees in 1950 and 1951 respectively. He later went on to study at McGill University in Canada with a Fulbright Scholarship and earned a master's degree in Islamic history. He received his PhD from the University of Dhaka for his work on Social History of Bengal under the supervision of Ahmad Hassan Dani, a renowned archaeologist of the Indian subcontinent. He completed a seminar in political science at the Institute of South Asian Studies at the University of California, Berkeley, after receiving a postgraduate fellowship. While studying at McGill University in Canada, he met Wilfred Cantwell Smith, a well-known Western orientalist and the founder of the Institute of Islamic Studies, and extended his knowledge of Islam.

=== Career ===
Khan was appointed a lecturer in the history of Islam at Karachi University in 1961. He then became an associate professor at the Islamic Research Institute in Islamabad in 1966. After the independence of Bangladesh in 1971, he returned to the country and joined the history department of Chittagong University in 1972 as an associate professor. He established the Department of History and Culture of Islam at Chittagong University in 1973 and joined the department as its founding chairman. In 1974, he was promoted to the post of Professor in the same department. He served as the first Director General of the Islamic Foundation Bangladesh. When the Southern University of Bangladesh was established in Chittagong in 2002, he was appointed its founding VC. He also served as a founding member and syndicate member of the International Islamic University, Chittagong.

=== Death ===
Khan died of old age complications on March 28, 2021, at the age of 95.

== Works ==
In English

- Selections from Bengal Government Records on Wahhabi Trials (1863–1870)
- Origin and Development of Experimental Science: Encounter with the Modern West
- Islamic Revivalism During 18th, 19th and 20th Centuries in North Africa, Saudi Arabia, Pakistan, India and Bangladesh
- History of the Faraʼidi Movement in Bengal, 1818-1906
- A bibliographical introduction to modern Islamic development in India and Pakistan, 1700-1955
- Titu Mir and his followers in British Indian records, 1831-1833 A.D.
- Muslim struggle for freedom in Bengal : from Plassey to Pakistan, A.D. 1757-1947

In Bangla

- Islame Darshana Chintar Patbhumi [Background of the Philosophical Thought in Islam]
- Jukti-Tottwer Swarup Sondhane: Prachya Bonam Protichya [In Quest of the Nature of Theory and Reasoning: the East vis-a-vis the West]
