= Alokito Bangladesh =

Bangladeshi Daily Newspaper

Alokito Bangladesh/আলোকিত বাংলাদেশ
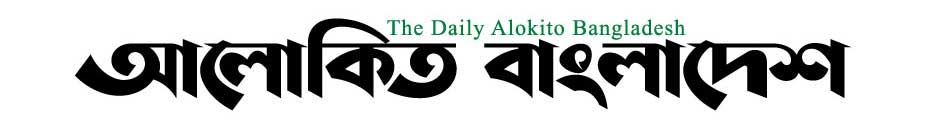

- 09-09-2023 cover of Alokito Bangladesh.
- Type: Daily newspaper
- Format: Broadsheet
- Owner: Alokito Media Ltd
- Publisher: Kazi Rafiqul Alam
- Editor: Kazi Rafiqul Alam
- Founded: 2013
- Political alignment: Liberal
- Language: Bengali
- Headquarters: 270/B, (3rd & 4th floor), Tejgaon Industrial Area. Dhaka-1208
- Website: http://www.alokitobangladesh.com/

Alokito Bangladesh (Bengali: আলোকিত বাংলাদেশ Alokito Bangladesh "Enlightened Bangladesh") is a daily newspaper in Bangladesh, published from Dhaka in the Bengali language. The name of the editor is Kazi Rafiqul Alam. The newspaper was founded in 2013, and is today published in both print and online formats.
