= Sylhet City Corporation =

Local governing body of Sylhet, Bangladesh

Sylhet City Corporation সিলেট সিটি কর্পোরেশন
- Emblem of the Sylhet City Corporation

Type
- Type: City corporation

History
- Founded: July 31, 2001; 24 years ago
- New session started: 23 February 2026

Leadership
- Mayor: Vacant since 19 August 2024
- Administrator: Abdul Qayyum Chowdhury, BNP since 23 February 2026
- Deputy Mayor: Vacant since 19 August 2024
- Chief Executive Officer: Md. Rejai Rafin Sarkar

Structure
- Seats: Vacant seats 56 councillors
- Length of term: Up to five years

Elections
- Voting system: First past the post
- First election: 12 April 2003
- Last election: 21 June 2023
- Next election: TBD

Meeting place
- Nagar Bhaban, Sylhet

Website
- www.scc.gov.bd

Sylhet City Corporation (Bengali: সিলেট সিটি কর্পোরেশন - in short: SCC), is a local government authority responsible for administering all civic services in the Sylhet, the city of Bangladesh. The SCC government is elected by popular vote every five years. The corporation is headed by a mayor, who oversees a council consisting of 56 councillors representing different wards of the city. The functions and powers of the SCC are defined under the provisions of The City Corporation act, 2009

== History ==
Urban administration in Sylhet dates back to the British colonial period. The town was first administered as a municipality with the establishment of the Sylhet Municipality in 1878, making it one of the oldest municipal bodies in present-day Bangladesh.

Following the independence of Bangladesh in 1971, Sylhet Municipality continued to function as a pourashava, overseeing local civic administration and urban services. With rapid population growth, urban expansion, and increasing administrative demands, the need for an upgraded metropolitan governance structure became evident.

As part of the government's decentralization and urban development initiatives, the Sylhet Municipality was upgraded to a city corporation in 2001 under the Local Government (City Corporation) Act. Consequently, the Sylhet City Corporation (SCC) was officially formed, granting the city enhanced administrative autonomy and expanded responsibilities.

Since its establishment, the SCC has played a central role in managing urban infrastructure, public health, sanitation, transportation, and development planning. The city corporation has also overseen successive expansions of municipal services and administrative wards in response to Sylhet’s growing metropolitan population.

At the 2022 Bangladesh Population and Housing Census, SCC has a population of 532,426 of whom 275,838 are male and 256,474 are female.

== Administration ==
The Sylhet City Corporation (SCC) administers the metropolitan area of Sylhet. The city is governed through 6 metropolitan thanas: Kotwali Model Thana, South Surma Thana, Moglabazar Thana, Jalalabad Thana, Bimanbandar Thana, Shah Poran Thana. These thanas are further subdivided into 42 wards and numerous mahallas. The SCC is responsible for municipal governance and civic services, including water supply, sanitation, waste management, road maintenance, street lighting, public health, and urban development within its jurisdiction.

== Functions and services ==
The Sylhet City Corporation (SCC) is responsible for administering the city and ensuring the provision of essential infrastructure and public services. Its functions include urban planning, transport management, healthcare, education, waste management, water supply, and security. Through these services, SCC aims to improve the quality of life for residents and promote sustainable urban development.

Departments of Sylhet City Corporation
#	Departments	Functions / Services
1	Office of the Mayor	Executive administration; city governance; supervision of all SCC services
2	Chief Executive Office	Departmental coordination; service implementation monitoring
3	Administration And Establishment	HR management; staff recruitment; service delivery monitoring
4	Finance and Accounts	Budget preparation; financial planning; payment processing; accounts management; internal audit
5	Engineering	Road-cutting permission; building design approval; contractor registration; land demarcation certificates
6	Urban Planning and Development	Road, drain, bridge, culvert and footpath development; land development; planned residential areas; city beautification
7	Electricity	Installation and maintenance of street lights; lamp-post management; city illumination
8	Transportation and Communication	Urban transport management; traffic & parking control; emergency transport; corpse handling; bus terminal management; road roller & ambulance services
9	Waste Management and Cleaning	Solid waste collection and disposal; street cleaning; drain clearing; mosquito control; landfill management
10	Health	Hospital & clinic management; maternal & child immunization; vitamin A campaigns; midwifery and health technology training
11	Registrar	Birth & death certificates; nationality, inheritance & character certificates
12	Education	Management of schools, madrasas, Sanskrit tolls, kindergartens, technical institutes; adult education; teacher training; cultural & theatre institutes
13	Water Supply and Sewerage	Water supply coordination; sewerage management under Sylhet WASA
14	Revenue	Trade license issuance & renewal; holding tax collection; shop/market allotment; lease and asset management
15	Security and Law and Order	City security; joint operations with SMP; CCTV installation and monitoring
16	Magistracy	Arbitration-based case settlement; mobile courts; anti-adulteration drives
17	Housing and Public Works	Distribution and maintenance of residential plots and flats
18	Cultural and Social Development	National Day celebrations; charity programs; and children’s park and playground construction & maintenance
19	Environmental Protection	Pollution control; climate change mitigation; urban greening; tree plantation
20	Religious Welfare	Support for Eid, Puja, and religious events; Qurbani market permissions; land allocation for religious events

== Annual budget ==
Sylhet City Corporation (SCC) has announced a budget of ৳925.4 crore (US$75 million) for 2023-24 fiscal year.

== Wards and councillors ==
Sylhet City Corporation is administratively divided into 42 wards. Each ward is represented by one elected councillor, while additional reserved women councillors are elected for groups of wards, as provided under the Local Government (City Corporation) Act.

Ward Serial of Sylhet City Corporation

=== Councillors ===
Ward	Locations Covered	Councillor	Party	
Ward-1	Dargah Gate, Dargah Mahalla, Rajargali	Vacant	TBD	
Ward-2	Zindabazar (part), Kazi Elias, Dariapara	Vacant	TBD	
Ward-3	Subid Bazar, Pathantula	Vacant	TBD	
Ward-4	Amberkhana, Rikabi Bazar	Vacant	TBD	
Ward-5	Mirer Moydan, Kazitula	Vacant	TBD	
Ward-6	Bandar Bazar	Vacant	TBD	
Ward-7	Lamabazar	Vacant	TBD	
Ward-8	Kuarpar	Vacant	TBD	
Ward-9	Tilagor	Vacant	TBD	
Ward-10	Shibgonj	Vacant	TBD	
Ward-11	Baluchor	Vacant	TBD	
Ward-12	Taltola	Vacant	TBD	
Ward-13	Modina Market	Vacant	TBD	
Ward-14	Housing Estate, Shahi Eidgah (part)	Vacant	TBD	
Ward-15	Shahi Eidgah	Vacant	TBD	
Ward-16	Bagbari	Vacant	TBD	
Ward-17	Lalabazar	Vacant	TBD	
Ward-18	Khadimnagar	Vacant	TBD	
Ward-19	Khadimpara	Vacant	TBD	
Ward-20	Jalalabad	Vacant	TBD	
Ward-21	Islampur	Vacant	TBD	
Ward-22	Tukerbazar	Vacant	TBD	
Ward-23	Moglabazar	Vacant	TBD	
Ward-24	Akhalia	Vacant	TBD	
Ward-25	Akhalia (part), Mollargaon	Vacant	TBD	
Ward-26	Nayasarak	Vacant	TBD	
Ward-27	Uposhohor	Vacant	TBD	
Ward-28	Mirabazar	Vacant	TBD	
Ward-29	Naiorpul	Vacant	TBD	
Ward-30	Chowhatta	Vacant	TBD	
Ward-31	Sheikhghat	Vacant	TBD	
Ward-32	Kazir Bazar	Vacant	TBD	
Ward-33	Sagor Dighirpar	Vacant	TBD	
Ward-34	Electric Supply area	Vacant	TBD	
Ward-35	South Surma (part)	Vacant	TBD	
Ward-36	South Surma	Vacant	TBD	
Ward-37	South Surma (extended)	Vacant	TBD	
Ward-38	Kadamtali	Vacant	TBD	
Ward-39	Shibgonj (extended)	Vacant	TBD	
Ward-40	Airport Road area	Vacant	TBD	
Ward-41	Subhani Ghat	Vacant	TBD	
Ward-42	Mendibagh	Vacant	TBD	
	Reserved women's seats			
43	Women's seat-1		Vacant	TBD
44	Women's seat-2		Vacant	TBD
45	Women's seat-3		Vacant	TBD
46	Women's seat-4		Vacant	TBD
47	Women's seat-5		Vacant	TBD
48	Women's seat-6		Vacant	TBD
49	Women's seat-7		Vacant	TBD
50	Women's seat-8		Vacant	TBD
51	Women's seat-9		Vacant	TBD
52	Women's seat-10		Vacant	TBD
53	Women's seat-11		Vacant	TBD
54	Women's seat-12		Vacant	TBD
55	Women's seat-13		Vacant	TBD
56	Women's seat-14		Vacant	TBD

== List of mayors ==
- Bangladesh Awami League
- Bangladesh Nationalist Party

Other factions

- Independent

Status

- Acting mayor and administrator

No.	Portrait	Officeholder (birth–death)	Election	Term of office			Designation	Political party	Reference
No.	Portrait	Officeholder (birth–death)	Election	From	To	Period	Designation	Political party	Reference
1		Badar Uddin Ahmed Kamran (1952-2020)	2003; 2008	12 April 2003	18 September 2013	10 years, 190 days	Mayor	Bangladesh Awami League	
2		Ariful Haque Choudhury	2013; 2018	18 September 2013	7 November 2023	10 years, 50 days	Mayor	Bangladesh Nationalist Party	
3		Anwaruzzaman Chowdhury	2023	7 November 2023	19 August 2024	286 days	Mayor	Bangladesh Awami League	
–		Abu Ahmad Siddiqui	–	19 August 2024	01 December 2024	104 days	Administrator	Independent	
–		Khan Md Reja-Un-Nabi	–	02 December 2024	22 February 2026	1 year, 82 days	Administrator	Independent	
–		Abdul Qayyum Chowdhury	–	23 February 2026	Incumbent	106 days	Administrator	Bangladesh Nationalist Party	

== Deputies ==
The deputy mayor (also known as Panel mayor) is a second-ranking official of city corporation. 3 Panel mayors are appointed by vote of councillors. The 1st panel mayor with the highest number of votes is appointed as deputy mayor. In the absence of the mayor, the deputy mayor controls all functions of the City Corporation.

Serial No.	Post	Name
01	Panel Mayor 1	Vacant
02	Panel Mayor 2	Vacant
03	Panel Mayor 3	Vacant

== Past elections ==
=== Election result 2023 ===
Sylhet Mayoral Election 2023
Party	Candidate	Votes	%	±%
AL	Anwaruzzaman Chowdhury	119,991	53.18	+10.32
JP(E)	Nazrul Islam Babul	50,862	22.54	New
Independent	Md. Shah Jahan Mia	28,688	12.71	New
IAB	Hafiz Maulana Mahmudul Hasan	12,794	5.67	+4.58
Independent	Abdul Hanif Kutu	4,296	1.90	New
Zaker Party	Zahirul Alam	3,405	1.51	New
Independent	Mushtaq Ahmed Rauf Mostafa	2,959	1.31	New
Independent	Salah Uddin Rimon	2,648	1.17	New
Majority		69,129	30.47	+27.40
Turnout		226,859	46.51%	▼16.88pp
Registered electors		487,753		
AL gain from BNP				

=== Election result 2018 ===
Sylhet Mayoral Election 2018
Party	Candidate	Votes	%	±%
BNP	Ariful Haque Choudhury	92,588	45.92	−13.88
AL	Badar Uddin Ahmed Kamran	86,392	42.86	+2.66
Jamaat	Ehsanul Mahbub Jubayer	10,954	5.44	New
IAB	Moazzem Hossain	2,195	1.09	New
Majority		6,196	3.07	−16.53
Turnout		201,577	63.39%	▲1.73pp
Registered electors		318,138		
BNP hold				

=== Election result 2013 ===
Sylhet Mayoral Election 2013
Party	Candidate	Votes	%	±%
BNP	Ariful Haque Choudhury	107,330	59.80	New
AL	Badar Uddin Ahmed Kamran	72,173	40.20	New
Majority		35,157	19.60	New
Turnout		179,503	61.66	New
Registered electors		291,046		
BNP gain from AL				
