= Ariful Haque Choudhury =

Bangladeshi politician and minister

- আরিফুল হক চৌধুরী
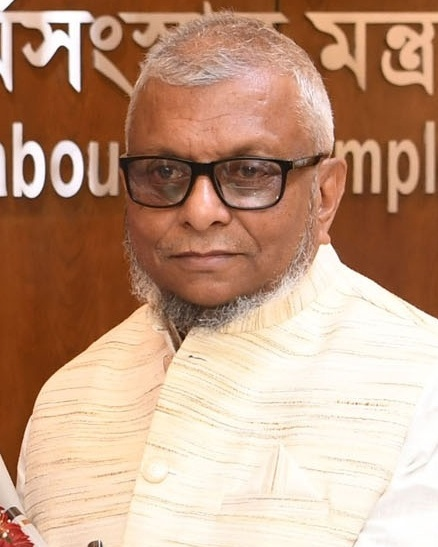
- Choudhury in 2026

Minister of Expatriates Welfare and Overseas Employment
- Incumbent
- Assumed office 17 February 2026
- Prime Minister: Tarique Rahman
- Preceded by: Asif Nazrul

Minister of Labour and Employment
- Incumbent
- Assumed office 17 February 2026
- Prime Minister: Tarique Rahman
- Preceded by: M. Sakhawat Hussain

Member of the Bangladesh Parliament for Sylhet-4
- Incumbent
- Assumed office 17 February 2026
- Preceded by: Imran Ahmad

2nd Mayor of Sylhet
- In office 18 September 2013 – 7 November 2023
- Preceded by: Badar Uddin Ahmed Kamran
- Succeeded by: Anwaruzzaman Chowdhury

Personal details
- Born: 23 November 1959 (age 66) Sylhet, East Pakistan, Pakistan
- Party: Bangladesh Nationalist Party
- Spouse: Shama Haque Choudhury
- Children: 2

Ariful Haque Choudhury (born 23 November 1959) is a Bangladesh Nationalist Party politician. He is currently a member of parliament from Sylhet-4 and serves as the minister of expatriates' welfare and overseas employment and the minister of labour and employment. Choudhury is also an executive member of the Bangladesh Nationalist Party. In 2003, he was elected as a councillor of Sylhet City Corporation. He later served two consecutive terms as the mayor of Sylhet.

== Early life ==
Ariful Haque Choudhury was born on 23 November 1959 in Kumarpara, Sylhet, to the famous Chowdhury family of Sylhet. His father is Muhammad Shafiqul Haque Choudhury, and his mother is Amina Begum.

== Career ==
Choudhury surrendered to joint forces on 25 February 2007 in Sylhet after emergency law was declared in Bangladesh. He was a ward commissioner of Sylhet City Corporation. He was also the chief of the development committee of Sylhet City Corporation. On 19 June 2007, Haji Dilar Ahmed, a contractor, sued Choudhury for extorting ৳15 lakh from him over awarding a contract for road construction with Kotwali Police Station. The Anti-Corruption Commission sued Choudhury for accumulating 26.3 million taka in illegal wealth through corruption with the Sylhet Police Station on 9 September 2007.

Choudhury is a former president of the Bangladesh Nationalist Party Sylhet unit. He and his wife, Shama Haque Chowdhury, were sued on 5 March 2008 by the Anti-Corruption Commission. He was accused of accumulating 25 million taka in illegal wealth through corruption. On 23 June 2008, he was sentenced to 10 years' imprisonment over the case. His wife was sentenced to three years' imprisonment in the case.

On 9 April 2013, Choudhury was acquitted in the corruption case filed by the Anti-Corruption Commission.

Choudhury became the mayor of Sylhet city by defeating Badar Uddin Ahmed Kamran in June 2013. Arif won the election by more than 35,000 votes.

Choudhury was a follower of Saifur Rahman, former finance minister of Bangladesh and member of parliament from Sylhet-1. After his win, he completed the Saifur Rahman Shishu Park in Sylhet and sent it for approval to the relevant ministry. The approval was refused, as the Awami League government was not keen to open a park named after a Bangladesh Nationalist Party leader. He tried to open it under two different names, 'Sylhet Natural Park' and 'Dakshin Surma Park', but was still refused permission by the government. The government of Bangladesh renamed the park to 'Jananetri Sheikh Hasina Shishu Park' and announced it will be opened soon in 2021.

On 13 November 2014, Bangladesh Police added him to a supplementary charge sheet they filed over the Shah A M S Kibria murder case from 2005. The new charge sheet also included GK Gaus, mayor of Habiganj, and Harris Chowdhury, former political secretary to Khaleda Zia. He was arrested after surrendering to the court on this case on 30 December 2014.

On 7 January 2015, Choudhury was suspended by the Ministry of Local Government, Rural Development and Co-operatives from his post of mayor after being charged in the Shah A M S Kibria murder case. He was then sacked from his post.

Choudhury had his acquittal verdict on the corruption charges scrapped by the Bangladesh Supreme Court on 15 January 2016. On 27 March 2016, Choudhury received bail on the Shah A M S Kibria murder case.

Choudhury was released from Sylhet Central Jail after receiving bail from the Bangladesh Supreme Court on 5 January 2017, which upheld his bail order issued by the Bangladesh High Court on 11 December 2016. On 13 March 2017, the Bangladesh High Court issued a stay order on Choudhury's suspension from the post of mayor of Sylhet. A bench of the Bangladesh Supreme Court, Appellate Division, led by Justice Surendra Kumar Sinha, agreed with the High Court order and announced that there was no restriction on Choudhury resuming his office on 23 March 2017. Choudhury was suspended from his post of mayor of Sylhet by the Ministry of Local Government, Rural Development and Co-operatives on 2 April 2017. The ministry also suspended Mosaddek Hossain Bulbul, mayor of Rajshahi and also a Bangladesh Nationalist Party politician.

Choudhury was nominated by the Bangladesh Nationalist Party to contest the 2018 mayoral election in Sylhet. He protested outside the office of the deputy commissioner of Sylhet Metropolitan Police over the arrest of Bangladesh Nationalist Party activists who were campaigning for his re-election. He was re-elected mayor of Sylhet on 12 August 2018. He beat the Awami League candidate, Badar Uddin Ahmed Kamran, by 6,196 votes. He had also faced a rebel candidate, Badruzzaman Selim, of the Bangladesh Nationalist Party, and another candidate, Ehsanul Mahbub Jubayer, from Bangladesh Jamaat-e-Islami. Foyzul Haque Raju, an activist of Bangladesh Jatiotabadi Chatra Dal, died in factional clashes near Choudhury's home after celebrating his election victory that day. He was sworn in on 5 September 2018 by Prime Minister Sheikh Hasina.

On 28 August 2018, the Bangladesh High Court ordered the Bangladesh government to hand over Choudhury's passport to him. The passport was confiscated after he had received bail in the Shah A M S Kibria murder case.

In August 2019, Choudhury announced a 7.89 billion taka budget, including a 2 billion taka allocation for infrastructure projects from the Bangladesh government, for Sylhet City Corporation. On 28 September 2019, Choudhury filed a general diary with Kotwali Police Station over threats he received on the phone.

22 councillors of Sylhet City Corporation, out of a total of 36 councillors, filed a complaint against Choudhury with the Ministry of Local Government, Rural Development and Co-operatives over corruption allegations and called for his removal. Some of the councillors would later tell the press that they did not call for his removal but for an investigation of specific corruption allegations against him. He boycotted the 2023 Sylhet City Corporation election as per the party decision. On 16 September 2023, he was promoted from the position of member of the National Executive Committee to advisor to the chairperson of the BNP.

=== 13th general election of Bangladesh candidacy ===
The Bangladesh Nationalist Party nominated Choudhury as its candidate for the Sylhet-4 (Gowainghat–Jaintiapur–Companiganj) constituency in the 13 Bangladeshi general election, announced on 4 November 2025 by party secretary general Mirza Fakhrul Islam Alamgir. According to local BNP sources, Choudhury had initially sought the party's nomination in Sylhet-1, where he had served as mayor twice, but was replaced by the party's other heavyweight candidate, Khandaker Abdul Muktadir. Although he had earlier declined proposals to contest from Sylhet-4, he was later instructed by then party chairperson late Khaleda Zia and began campaigning in the constituency on November 7, 2025.

== Personal life ==
On 10 September 2020, Ariful Haque Choudhury tested positive for COVID-19 during the COVID-19 pandemic in Bangladesh. His wife also tested positive in June 2020 and recovered at home.
