= Badar Uddin Ahmed Kamran =

Bangladeshi politician (1951–2020)

- বদর উদ্দিন আহমেদ কামরান

1st Mayor of Sylhet
- In office 12 April 2003 – 18 September 2013
- Preceded by: Post Established
- Succeeded by: Ariful Haque Choudhury

Personal details
- Born: 1 January 1951 Sylhet, East Bengal, Dominion of Pakistan
- Died: 15 June 2020 (aged 69) Dhaka, Bangladesh
- Cause of death: COVID-19
- Party: Bangladesh Awami League
- Spouse: Asma Kamran

Badar Uddin Ahmed Kamran (Bengali: বদর উদ্দিন আহমেদ কামরান; 1 January 1951 – 15 June 2020) was a Bangladeshi politician and the first mayor of Sylhet City, a role he was elected to twice. In 2013, he lost to Ariful Haque Choudhury by nearly 3,000 votes. He was also a member on the standing committee of Awami League. He died on 15 June 2020, from COVID-19 at the age of 69.

== Early life ==
Kamran was born on 1 January 1951. He was elected ward commissioner of Sylhet in 1973, when he was still a high school student.

== Career ==
Kamran was elected chairman of Sylhet municipality board in 1995. From 1989 to 2002, he served as the general secretary of Sylhet city unit of Awami League. He became the mayor of Sylhet city by defeating Muhammad Abdul Haque in March 2003; In which Kamran won the election by more than 20,000 votes. He became the president of Sylhet City unit of Awami League. In 2005, while he was inaugurating a tennis court, members of Harkat-ul-Jihad-al-Islami Bangladesh threw grenades at him, in an attempt to assassinate him. In November 2008, six members of Harkat-ul-Jihad-al-Islami Bangladesh were charged with attempting to assassinate him.

Since then Kamran won the 2008 election, even though he was imprisoned, as the people have high adoration for him. He was also released from prison and had even travelled to London recently with the current prime minister Sheikh Hasina as part of her delegation. As with many politicians, there are allegations of political corruption he may have been involved with. Kamran was arrested in connection with the Kitchen Market Graft case.

Although he obtained bail in the case, Kamran was being detained in another case filed under the Emergency Powers Rules. The Prothom Alo published a series of reports of Kamran's corruption during his time in office. Albeit he submitted his nomination form in order to compete for the 2008 mayoral election run. He was viewed by voters as being unjustly targeted by the military backed caretaker government. Kamran was re-elected mayor in a landslide election victory, and he had received more than 83,000 votes than his opponent. On 17 August 2008, he was moved from Comilla Central Jail to Sylhet Central Jail. He resigned from Awami League on 31 August and on 5 September 2008, he was released on bail from jail.

Kamran lost the mayoral election in 2013 to Ariful Haque Choudhury, and he also contested the mayoral election again in 2018 and lost to Ariful Haque Choudhury.

== Personal life ==
Kamran was married to Asma Kamran. Asma tested positive for COVID-19 with her husband in 2020. Kamran had returned to Bangladesh from the United Kingdom on 5 March 2020. Despite being required to be in quarantine, he was seen attending a number of political programs in Dhaka and Sylhet. He afterwards apologized for violating quarantine.

== Death ==
Kamran died on 15 June 2020, at the Combined Military Hospital, Dhaka. He tested positive for COVID-19 during the COVID-19 pandemic in Bangladesh on 5 June 2020, and was admitted to Sylhet Shamsuddin Ahmed Hospital. As his condition deteriorated, he was transferred to Combined Military Hospital, Dhaka by air ambulance on 7 June 2020. He was pronounced dead on 15 June 2020, at 3:43am while being treated at Combined Military Hospital, Dhaka. He was buried in his hometown, Sylhet.
