= Aliah University =

University in West Bengal, India

- Seal of the Aliah University
- Former name: Calcutta Mohammedan College/Aliah Madrasha/Calcutta Madrasha (1780-2008)
- Motto: Advancement of Education and culture
- Type: Public
- Established: 1780; 246 years ago as Calcutta Mohammedan College/Aliah Madrasha/Calcutta Madrasha; 2008; 18 years ago as Aliah University
- Academic affiliations: UGC; AICTE; INC; NCTE
- Budget: ₹162.6506 crore (US$17 million) (2021–22 est.)
- Chancellor: Governor of West Bengal
- Vice-Chancellor: Dr. Rafikul Islam
- Academic staff: 211 (2022)
- Students: 6,366 (2022)
- Undergraduates: 3,548 (2022)
- Postgraduates: 2,426 (2022)
- Doctoral students: 392 (2022)
- Location: Action Area ll-A, 27, New Town, West Bengal, 700160, India; 22°35′22″N 88°29′07″E
- Campus: Urban
- Website: aliah.ac.in

Aliah University (AU; Arabic: جامعہ عالیہ, Bengali: আলিয়া বিশ্ববিদ্যালয়) is a public state university in New Town, West Bengal, India. Previously known as Mohammedan College of Calcutta, it was elevated to university in 2008. It has its jurisdiction over West Bengla.

== History ==
Aliah University (AU) is one of the oldest modern-style educational institutes in Asia, and first in India. It was set up in October 1780 by Warren Hastings, the British Governor-General of East India Company near Sealdah in Calcutta. A number of titles were used for it, such as Islamic College of Calcutta, Calcutta Madrasah, Calcutta Mohammedan College and Madrasah-e-Aliah. Of these, Calcutta Mohammedan College was that used by Warren Hastings.

The original building was completed in 1782 at Bow Bazaar (near Sealdah). The college moved to its campus on Wellesley Square in the 1820s. Initially it taught natural philosophy, Arabic, Persian, theology and Islamic law, astronomy, grammar, logic, arithmetic, geometry, rhetoric and oratory. The Calcutta Madrasa followed different models for different subjects, like Dars-i Nizami of Firingi Mahal for Persian and Arabic, and the old Peripatetic School Model for the Logic and Philosophy.

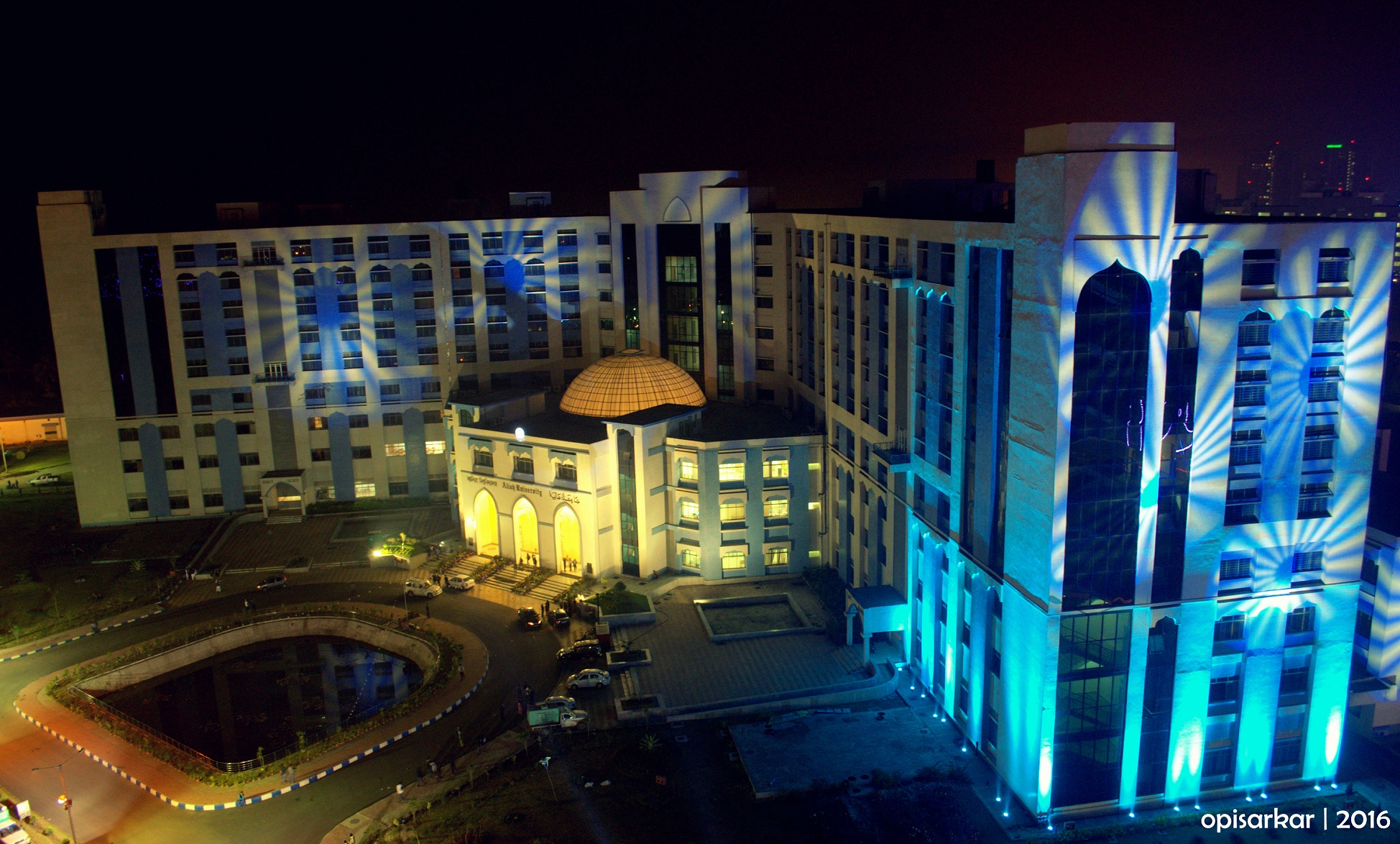
Aliah University, Science & Technology Campus, New Town

== Campus ==
Aliah University has three campuses for different types of curriculum located at New Town, Park Circus and Taltala.

Chief Minister Mamata Banerjee laid the foundation stone of Aliah University New Town Campus on 15 December 2011. Later on 11 November 2014 Mamata Banerjee inaugurated the finished campus. New Town campus contains 156 class rooms with a capacity of 12,000 students and houses Science and Technology students only. The campus also has separate boy's and girl's hostel. New Town campus also has three annexure buildings dedicated to various laboratories and a central library.

== Academics ==
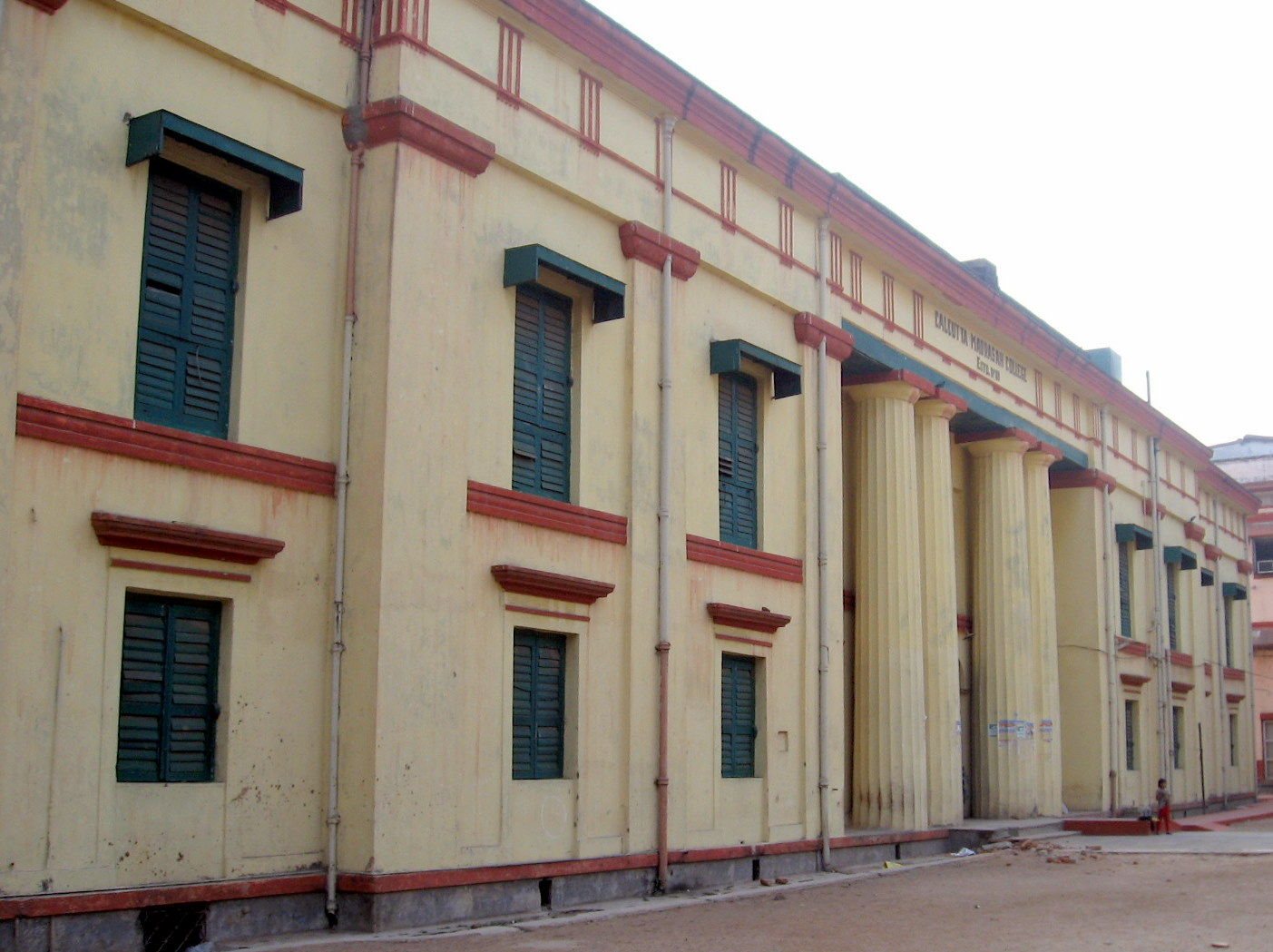
Heritage Building, Taltala Campus

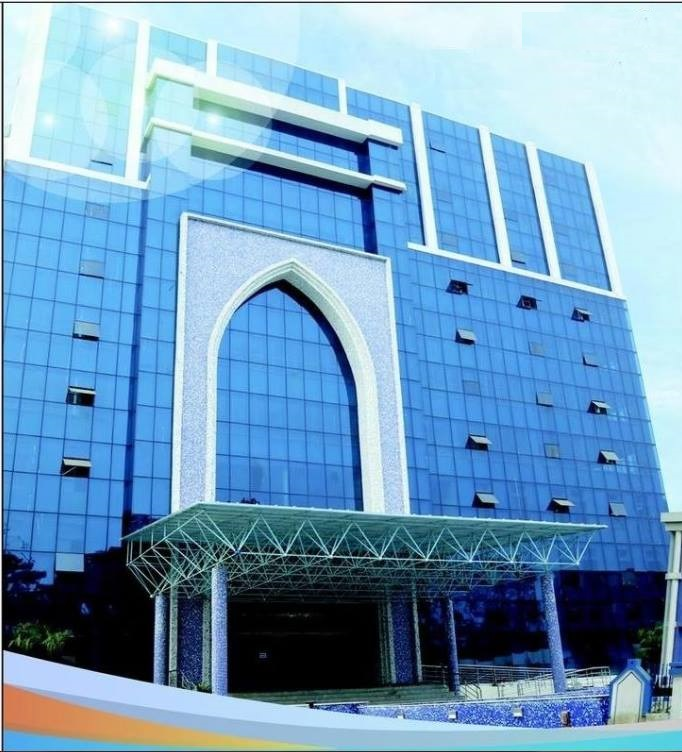
Aliah University City Campus, Park Circus

=== Admission ===
Admission to most undergraduate and postgraduate courses in Aliah University is granted through written entrance examinations and for B.Tech. programs through WBJEE. Admission to M.S. and PhD programmes is based on a written test and a personal interview.

Admission to undergraduate programmes is based on merit rank of the "Aliah University Admission Test" (AUAT), which consists of a written examination of "Multiple Choice Type Questions" (MCQ), clearing of which leads to an interview and final selection of the candidate. Candidates who qualify for admission through AUAT can apply for admission to LLM. ( Masters of Law ), B.Tech. (Bachelor of Technology), Integrated MBA (Master of Business Administration), MCA (Master of Computer Applications), M.Sc. (Master of Science) and M.A (Master of Arts) courses in different Engineering, Business, Science and Arts subjects. Aliah University has also M.Tech. (Master of Technology) program.

=== Accreditation ===
The University Grants Commission (U.G.C.) accorded recognition to the university in terms of Section 12B of the U.G.C. Act, in 2019. Aliah University has been awarded a B+ grade by NAAC.

== Controversy and criticism ==
In 2016, a series of protests by the students of the university took place on the main campus (New Town) against the disordering principle of the then vice chancellor, Abu Taleb Khan; because students were experiencing lack of books in library, lack of faculty, bad condition of lab etc. from the beginning of the university. The protest began on 8 November 2016. On 18 November 2016, students insulted their VC Abu Taleb Khan giving a black rose to him. They blockaded the main gates of the university and the students made a loud slogan. With the help of police and security guards of the university, the VC entered in his office.

Students were requested by the EC members, Fact Finding Committee and also the Minority and Madrasah Education Minister Giasuddin Molla to stop the protest and class boycotts. But students said they will continue to boycott classes until the vice chancellor resigns.

== Departments and Centers ==
- Department of Engineering and Technology
  - Civil Engineering
  - Computer Science and Engineering
  - Electrical Engineering
  - Electronic and Communication Engineering
  - Mechanical Engineering
- Department of Basic Science
  - Biological Science
  - Chemistry
  - Mathematics and Statistics
  - Nursing
  - Physics
- Department of Humanities and Social Science
  - Arabic
  - Bengali
  - Economics
  - Education
  - English
  - Geography
  - History
  - Islamic Studies
  - Islamic Theology
  - Journalism and Mass Communication
  - Law
  - Urdu
- Department of Management & Business Administration

== Notable people ==
- Abu Nasr Waheed, Islamic scholar
- Nawsad Siddique, Member of West Bengal Legislative Assembly
- Quamrul Hassan, Bangladeshi artist
- Nawab Abdul Latif, Bengali aristocrat, educator and social worker
- A. T. M. Mustafa, Pakistani lawyer, politician and cricketer
- Atiquzzaman Khan, Bangladeshi educationist, journalist and cricketer

== See also ==
- List of oldest universities in continuous operation
- University of Calcutta
- Colleges and institutes in India
- List of universities in India
- University Grants Commission (India)
- Education in India
- Ministry of Human Resource Development (India)
