= 2024–25 Women's Bangladesh Cricket League =

- Dates: 21 December 2024 – 30 January 2025
- Administrator: Bangladesh Cricket Board
- Cricket format: First-class
- Tournament format: Round-robin
- Host(s): Rajshahi, Bangladesh
- Participants: 4
- Matches: 6

The 2024–25 Women's Cricket League or Women's BCL 2024–25 is the second edition of the Women's Bangladesh Cricket League, a three-day first-class cricket competition in Bangladesh. This is the first edition of the tournament to consist of three-day matches. The tournament was held from 21 December 2024 until 30 January 2025 at the Shaheed Qamaruzzaman Stadium and the Bangla Trac Academy Ground in Rajshahi.

== Teams ==
- East Zone
- Central Zone
- North Zone
- South Zone

== Venue ==
Rajshahi	Rajshahi
Shaheed Qamaruzzaman Stadium	Bangla Trac Cricket Academy Ground
Capacity: 15,000	–
Shaheed Qamaruzzaman Stadium	
Matches: 3	Matches: 3

== Squads ==
Central Zone	East Zone	North Zone	South Zone
Nigar Sultana (c, wk); Sharmin Akhter; Farzana Akter; Shorna Akter; Fuara Begum; Disha Biswas; Puja Chakraborty; Mumta Hena Hasnat; Sadia Islam; Shuborna Karmokar; Murshida Khatun; Lata Mondal; Riya Akter Shikha	Fahima Khatun (c); Sharmin Akhter; Taj Nehar; Shampa Biswas; Dilara Akter (wk); Farzana Akter Boby; Nasima Khatun; Shorifa Khatun; Suraiya Azmin; Khadija Tul Kubra; Dipa Khatun; Ashrafi Yasmin; Jannatul Islam Tithi; Sabikun Nahar	Sobhana Mostary (c); Fargana Haque; Sharmin Sultana; Achena Jannat; Rachona Akter (wk); Ishma Tanjim; Ritu Moni; Misty Rani Saha; Jannatul Ferdous; Fariha Trisna; Luky Khatun; Fatema Jahan; Marufa Akter; Laboni Akter	Rabeya Khan (c); Bithi Parvin; Unnoti Akter; Rubya Haider; Fayema Tuz Jahara; Shamima Sultana (wk); Rumana Ahmed; Ayasha Rahman; Salma Khatun; Leky Chakma; Rupa Roy; Prity Das; Sultana Khatun; Sanjida Akter Meghla

== Points table ==
Pos	Team	Pld	W	D	L	Pts
1	South Zone	2	1	1	0	3
2	Central Zone	2	0	2	0	2
3	North Zone	2	0	2	0	2
4	East Zone	2	0	1	1	1

Updated to match(es) played on 29 December 2024. Source: Cricheroes

== Match Summary ==
Below is a summary of results for each team's seven regular season matches in chronological order. A team's opponent for any given match is listed above the margin of victory/defeat.

Team
Team	1	2	3	Pos
Central Zone (CZ)	NZ draw	EZ draw	SZ ?	
East Zone (EZ)	SZ; 7 runs	CZ draw	NZ ?	
North Zone (NZ)	CZ draw	SZ draw	EZ ?	
South Zone (SZ)	EZ; 7 runs	NZ draw	CZ ?	

Team's results→	Won	Draw	Lost	N/R

== Fixtures ==
=== Round 1 ===
21-23 December 2024
Match 1

East Zone	v	South Zone
193 (59.4 overs); Sharmin Akhter 88 (101); Sultana Khatun 3/30 (7.4 overs)		347 (93.3 overs); Ayasha Rahman 94 (154); Shorifa Khatun 4/67 (17.3 overs)
162 (86 overs); Taj Nehar 43 Khan (122); Rabeya Khan 5/18 (19 overs)		12/0 (5 overs); Shamima Sultana 8* (21)

South Zone won by 10 wickets
Bangla Trac Academy Cricket Ground, Rajshahi
Umpires: Asadur Rahman (Ban) and Mishu Chowdhury (Ban)
Player of the match: Rabeya Khan (South Zone)

- South Zone won the toss and elected to field first.

21-23 December 2024
Match 2

North Zone	v	Central Zone
240/9d (95 overs); Fargana Haque 86 (246); Nahida Akter 7/48 (27 overs)		387/8d (125.5 overs); Nigar Sultana 153* (253); Jannatul Ferdous 6/113 (37 overs)
204/1 (102 overs); Fargana Haque 102* (126); Disha Biswas 1/27 (11 overs)

Drawn.
Shaheed Qamaruzzaman Stadium, Rajshahi
Umpires: Habibur Rahman (Ban) and Dolly Rani (Ban)
Player of the match: Nigar Sultana

- North Zone won the toss and elected to bat first.

=== Round 2 ===
26-28 December
Match 3
scorecard

North Zone	v	South Zone
238 (80.3 Ov); Misty Rani 47 (76); Salma Khatun 3/22 (17 overs)		(72.0 Ov); Rumana Ahmed 57 (137); Jannatul Ferdus 5/58 (22 overs)
257/5d (80.0 Ov); Sobhana Mostary 118 (146); Rabeya Khan 2/50 (20 overs)		232/8 (66.0 Ov); RH Jhelik 49 (75); Jannatul Ferdus 3/98 (22 overs)

Drawn.
Bangla Trac Academy Cricket Ground, Rajshahi
Umpires: Champa Chakma and Habibur Rahman
Player of the match: Jannatul Ferdus (North Zone)

- South Zone won the toss & elected to field first

26-28 December 2024
Match 4
scorecard

Central Zone	v	East Zone
354 (124.4 Ov); Dilara Akter 102 (131); Nahida Akter 4/71 (26 overs)		528/8 (156.0 Ov); Nigar Sultana 171 (322); Fahima Khatun 3/46 (26 overs)

Draw
Shaheed Qamaruzzaman Stadium, Rajshahi
Umpires: Asadur Rahman & Dolly Rani Sarkar
Player of the match: Nigar Sultana (Central Zone)

- East Zone won the toss & elected to bat first

== Statistics ==
Most Runs			Most Wicket		
Batter	Inns	Runs	Bowler	Inns	Wkts
Nigar Sultana (CZ)	2	324	Jannatul Ferdus (NZ)	3	14
Murshida Khatun (CZ)	2	236	Nahida Akter (CZ)	3	11
Farzana Haque (NZ)	4	221	Salma Khatun (SZ)	4	7
Last updated:29 December 2024. cricheroes
