= Women's North Zone cricket team =

Bangladeshi cricket team

Women's North Zone Cricket Team
- League: Women's Bangladesh Cricket League

Personnel
- Captain: Sobhana Mostary
- Owner: BCB

Team information
- City: Rangpur Division; Rajshahi Division
- Founded: 2021
- Home ground: Shaheed Kamruzzaman Stadium, Rajshahi; Shaheed Chandu Stadium, Bogra
- Official website: Cricheroes
First-class kit

The Women's North Zone cricket team is a women's first-class cricket team that represents North of Bangladesh – the Rajshahi Division and Rangpur Division – in the Women's Bangladesh Cricket League (WBCL). It is a composite team of two Bangladeshi first-class women's cricket teams from north Bangladesh: Rajshahi Division cricket team and Rangpur Division cricket team.

== History ==
Following the success of Bangladesh in 2018 Women's Twenty20 Asia Cup, plans were going on to establish a two-day red-ball match for women since August 2018. In April 2021, the International Cricket Council awarded permanent women's Test status to Bangladesh women's national cricket team. The lack of a domestic first-class cricket competition for women prevented Bangladesh to start playing Test matches. The 2022–23 edition is the first-ever women's multi-day competition in Bangladesh, launched by the Bangladesh Cricket Board in March 2023. In March 2023, the tournament was inaugurated by the chairman of BCB women's wing Shafiul Alam Chowdhury Nadel, at Sheikh Abu Naser Stadium in Khulna. The competition was introduced to prepare women cricketers for Test cricket and adapt to the longer version of the game.

Then in 2024 BCB announced Women’s Bangladesh Cricket League will also have 4 teams like Men's Bangladesh Cricket League tournament. North Zone is one of the four teams along with South Zone, Central Zone and East Zone.

== Current squad ==
Name	Batting style	Bowling style
Batters
Sobhana Mostary (C)	RHB	right arm medium
Fargana Haque	RHB	right arm off break
Sharmin Sultana	RHB	
Achena Jannat	RHB	
Wicket-keepers
Rachona Akter	RHB	
All-rounders
Ishma Tanjim	RHB	right arm off break
Ritu Moni	RHB	right arm medium
Misty Rani Saha	RHB	right arm off break
Jannatul Ferdous	RHB	right arm off break
Bowlers
Fariha Trisna	RHM	left arm medium
Luky Khatun	RHB	right arm leg break
Fatema Jahan	LHB	right arm off break
Marufa Akter	RHB	right arm medium fast
Laboni Akter	RHB	right arm off break
Last Update = 17 December 2024
