= Kulaura Upazila =

Kulaura কুলাউড়া
- Upazila
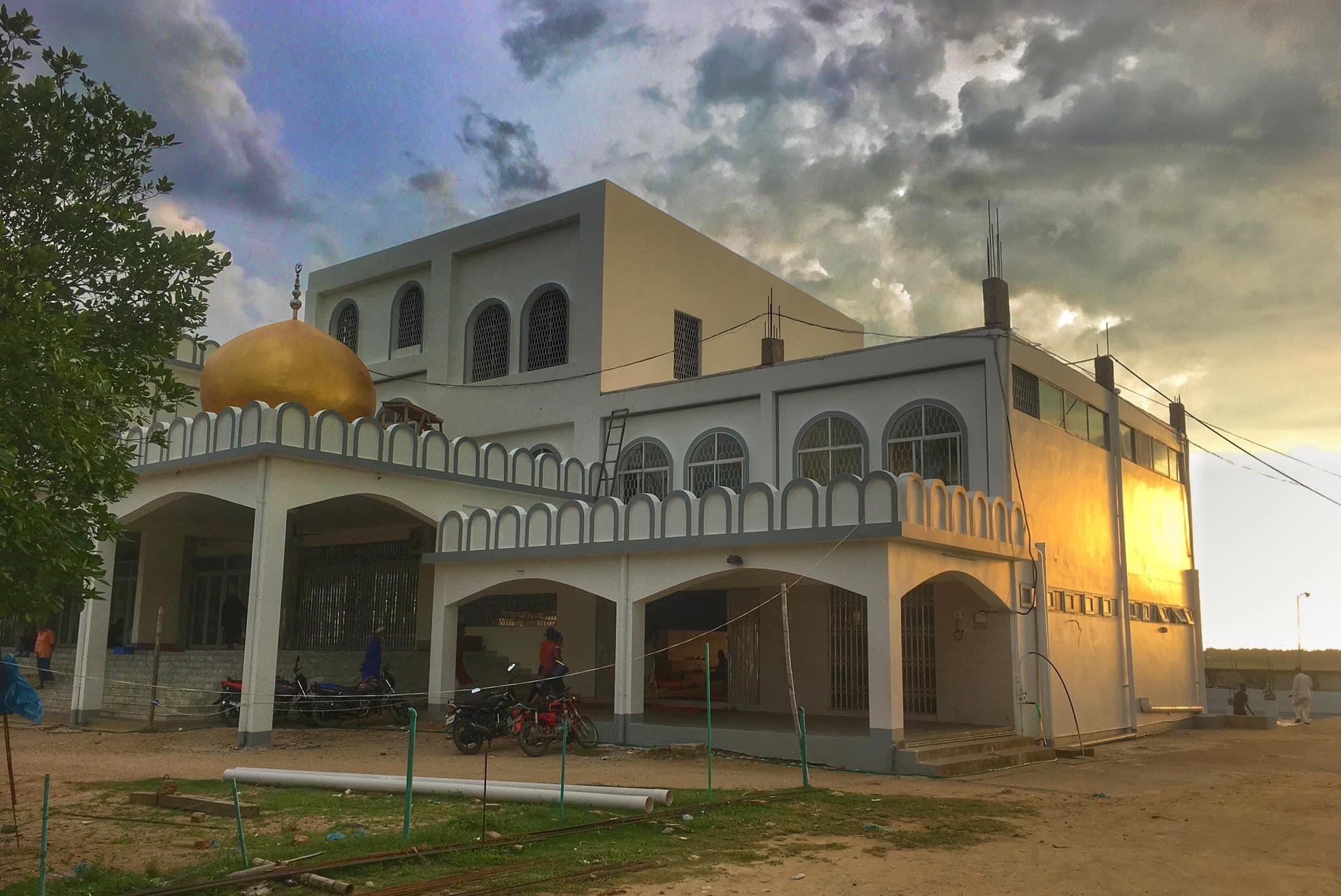
- Rabirbazar Jame Mosque, Kulaura upazila

- Coordinates: 24°31′N 92°2′E
- Country: Bangladesh
- Division: Sylhet
- District: Moulvibazar

Government
  - MP (Moulvibazar-2): Md Shawkatul Islam
  - Upazila Chairman: Vacant

Area
  - Total: 545.73 km^{2} (210.71 sq mi)

Population (2022)
  - Total: 397,746
  - Density: 728.83/km^{2} (1,887.7/sq mi)
- Demonym(s): Kulaurian , Kulauri
- Time zone: UTC+6 (BST)
- Postal code: 3230
- Area code: 08624
- Website: kulaura.moulvibazar.gov.bd

Kulaura (Bengali: কুলাউড়া), is the largest upazila of Moulvibazar District in north-eastern Bangladesh. The total area of this upazila is 545 km^{2}. Hakaluki Haor, the largest marsh wetland in Sylhet Division and one of the largest in Bangladesh is partially located in Kulaura.

== Economy and tourism ==
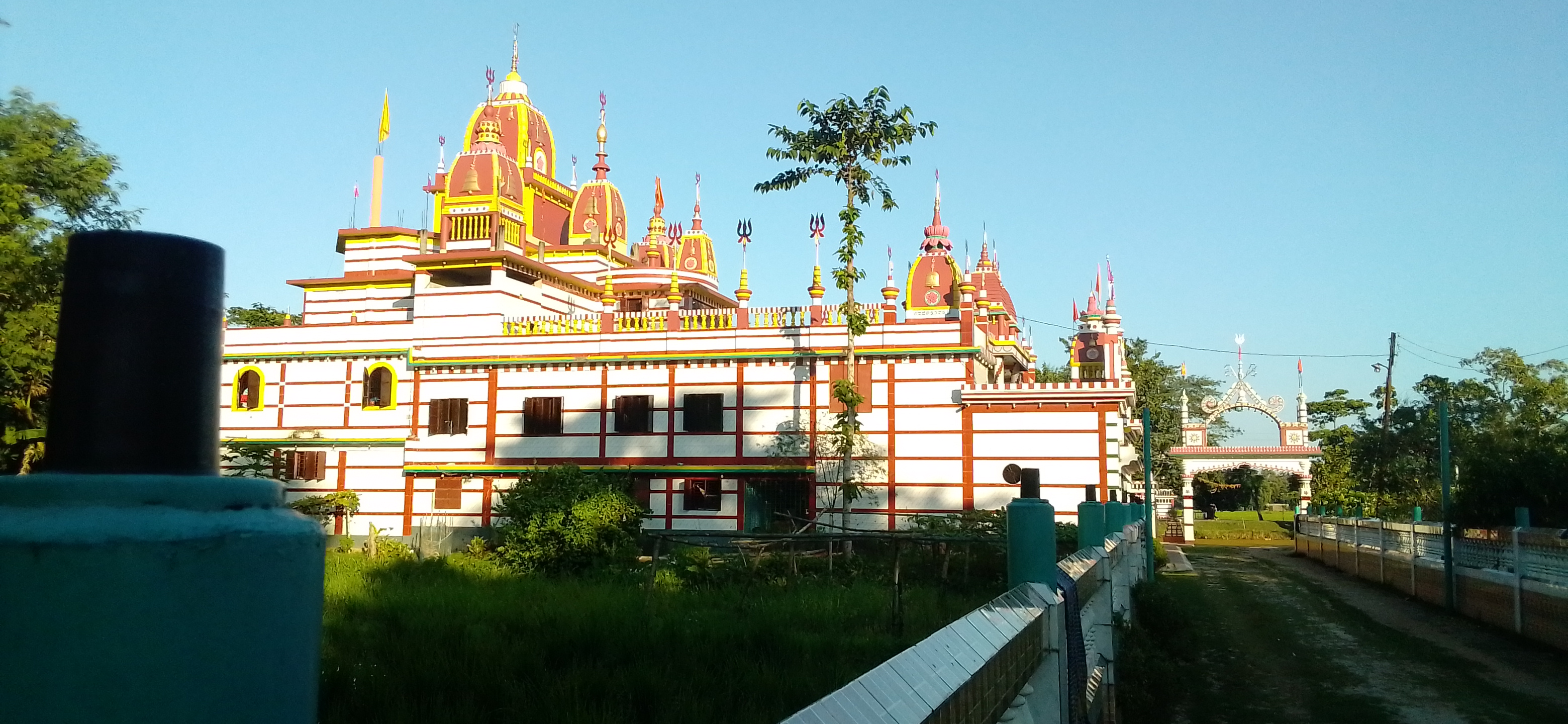
Kadipur Shiv Bari Temple

Kulaura is home to many tourist attractions and natural geography. It contains many hills, tea gardens and the largest haor in Asia; the Hakaluki Haor. Kadipur Shib Bari Temple is the largest Hindu temple in Sylhet situated at Kulaura. Hindu goddess Durga's sculpture of 1000 hands is inside the temple. There is also a ISKCON temple in Rangirkul, Kulaura known as "Rangirkul Bidyashram" & a CTS temple at Pushainagar. Other sites include the Prithimpassa Nawab Estate, Rabir Bazar Jame Masjid, and the mausoleums of Haji Pir in Sharifpur, Shah Hamid Faruqi in Kaukapon and Shah Helimuddin Qurayshi Chowdhury Bazar.

== Geography ==
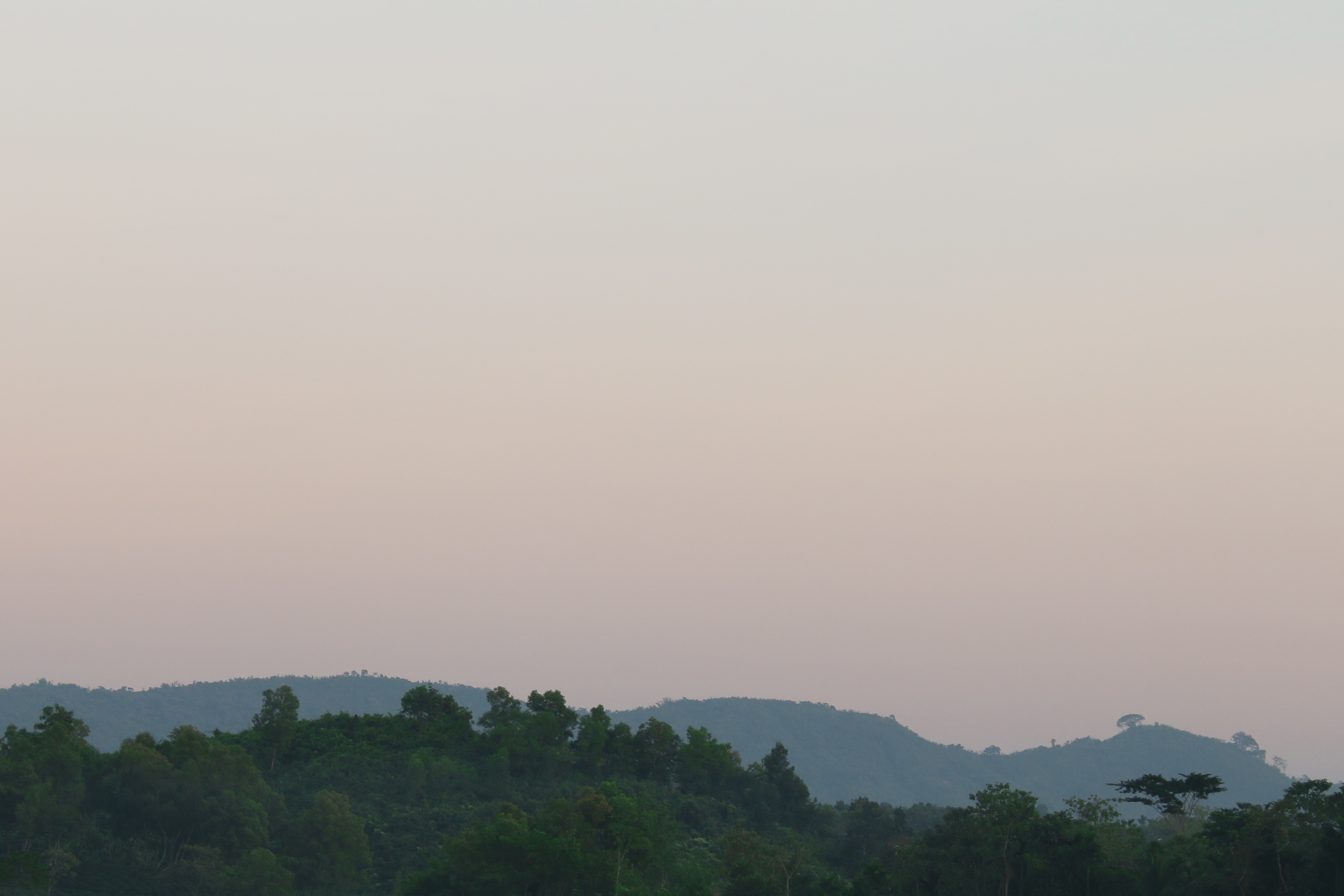
Kala pahar is located in the Longla ridge of the Hararganj-Singla range.

The location of Kulaura upazila is 24.5167 degrees north latitudes up to 92.0333 degrees East longitude. The area size is 679.25 square kilometers (262 square miles). Barolekha, Juri and Fenchuganj upazilas on the north, Rajnagar and Kamalganj upazila on the west, Tripura of India on the south, Tripura and Assam in the east of Kulaura.

The largest Haor of in Asia, 'Hakaluki's most of area is under Kulaura. Also Longlia, Gualzoor etc. are the notable Haor. The highest peak in the Sylhet region, Kala pahar, can be found in Kulaura Upazila.

== History ==
Many archaeological sites and relics such as the Vidia Ashram in Rangirkul, Gagan Tila, Chand Gram Dighi and the copper plates of Bhatera provide evidence for early settlements in Kulaura.

The East India Company first heavily influenced their trading of tea in Kulaura. It became an important location for tea cultivation in Bengal and major export. Local entrepreneurs also started founding their estates such as Nawab Ali Amjad Khan who established the Rungicherra (also Rungichara) Tea Estate.

In the anti-British Sepoy Mutiny of 1857, 300 sepoys who revolted against the British, looted the Chittagong Treasury and took shelter with Nawab Gous Ali Khan of Prithimpassa. The treasury remained under rebel control for several days. Abdul Ghafur, grandfather of Ali Haydar ibn Ali Gawhar, of Kanihati was present during the mutiny.

In 1921, the non-cooperation movement also spread to Kulaura after being established by Purnendu Kishore Sengupta in Vidia Ashram, Rangirkul. In 1939, there was an anti-British protest held in Nabin Chandra School. Many students were attacked and expelled by the British forces based in Kalapani Haor.

In 1950, the Shah of Iran, Mohammad Reza Pahlavi, visited Prithimpassa and stayed for four days at the palace and went wildlife hunting in the Estate forests alongside Khwaja Nazimuddin and Ayub Khan.

During the Bangladesh War of Independence, Kulaura was the centre of the Battle of Gazipur in Gazipur Tea Garden. The battle raged from the 4th to the 5th of December 1971 and was a prelude to the Battle of Sylhet. The Pakistan army camped in Kulaura Hospital and Nabin Chandra School and killed over 100 Bengali militants and civilians. Chiral Muchir Bari, bank of Padma Dighi of Ali Amjad High School were experienced mass killings. A graveyard in Chatolgaon hosts many martyrs.

== Demographics ==
Religions in Kulaura Upazila (2022)
Religion	Percent
Islam	79.25%
Hinduism	19.05%
Christianity	1.70%
Other or not stated	0.01%

According to the 2022 Bangladeshi census, Kulaura Upazila had 83,242 households and a population of 397,746. 9.63% of the population were under 5 years of age. Kulaura had a literacy rate (age 7 and over) of 75.53%: 76.44% for males and 74.74% for females, and a sex ratio of 89.37 males for every 100 females. 57,248 (14.39%) lived in urban areas. Ethnic population is 10873 (2.74%) of which Khasi are 4472.

Population of upazila by ethnicity (2022)
1. Bengali (97.3%)
2. Khasi (1.12%)
3. Others (1.62%)

According to the 2011 Census of Bangladesh, Kulaura Upazila had 66,465 households and a population of 360,195. 93,400 (25.93%) were under 10 years of age. Kulaura had a literacy rate (age 7 and over) of 51.88%, compared to the national average of 51.8%, and a sex ratio of 1049 females per 1000 males. 27,491 (7.63%) lived in urban areas. Ethnic population was 11,804 (3.28%), of which Khasi were 4,311.

At the 1991 Bangladesh census, Kulaura had a population of 339,673, of whom 171,346 were aged 18 or older. Males constituted 51.09% of the population and females 48.91%. Kulaura had an average literacy rate of 28.8% (7+ years) compared to the national average of 32.4%.

== Administration ==
Kulaura Upazila is divided into Kulaura Municipality and 13 union parishads: Baramchal, Bhatera, Bhukshimail, Brammanbazar, Hazipur, Joychandi, Kadipur, Kormodha, Kulaura, Prithimpassa, Rauthgaon, Sharifpur, and Tilagaon Union. The union parishads are subdivided into 128 mauzas and 447 villages.

Kulaura Municipality is subdivided into 9 wards and 26 mahallas.

== Notable people ==
- Altaf Husain (1900 –1968), educationist and journalist.
- Abdul Jabbar, politician and former member of parliament
- Nadia Shah, politician, councillor and former mayor of Camden, first female British Bangladeshi mayor.
- Abdul Muntaquim Chaudhury, former Member of the Pakistan National Assembly
- Sadeq Ali, writer, poet and judge best known for the Halat-un-Nabi puthi
- Rawshan Ara Bachchu, Bengali language movement activist
- Zamindars of Monraj
- A. N. M. Yusuf, Bangladesh Muslim League politician
- Abul Hasan, cricketer
- Shafiqur Rahman, physician, politician of the Bangladesh Jamaat-e-Islami
- MM Shahin, politician
- Abdul Matin, former MP for Moulvibazar-2
- Prithimpassa Family
- Ali Amjad Khan, 8th Nawab of Longla and Honorary Magistrate
- Ali Abbas Khan, Jatiya Party politician
- Ali Haider Khan, 9th Nawab of Longla and politician
- Sultan Mohammad Mansur Ahmed, politician, Former VP of DUCSU, Former President of Bangladesh Chhatra League, Former Organising Secretary of Bangladesh Awami League and the Current Member of the Jatiya Sangsad from Moulvibazar-2

== See also ==
- Upazilas of Bangladesh
- Districts of Bangladesh
- Divisions of Bangladesh
- Administrative geography of Bangladesh
