= Women's East Zone cricket team =

Bangladeshi cricket team

Women's East Zone Cricket Team
- League: Women's Bangladesh Cricket League

Personnel
- Captain: Fahima Khatun
- Owner: BCB

Team information
- City: Chittagong Division; Sylhet Division
- Founded: 2021
- Home ground: Zohur Ahmed Chowdhury Stadium
- Official website: Cricheroes
First-class kit

The Women's East Zone cricket team is a women's first-class cricket team that represents East of Bangladesh – the Chittagong Division and Sylhet Division – in the Women's Bangladesh Cricket League (WBCL). It is a composite team of two Bangladeshi first-class women's teams from east Bangladesh: Chittagong Division cricket team and Sylhet Division cricket team.

== History ==
Following the success of Bangladesh in 2018 Women's Twenty20 Asia Cup, plans were going on to establish a two-day red-ball match for women since August 2018. In April 2021, the International Cricket Council awarded permanent women's Test status to Bangladesh women's national cricket team. The lack of a domestic first-class cricket competition for women prevented Bangladesh to start playing Test matches. The 2022–23 edition is the first-ever women's multi-day competition in Bangladesh, launched by the Bangladesh Cricket Board in March 2023. In March 2023, the tournament was inaugurated by the chairman of BCB women's wing Shafiul Alam Chowdhury Nadel, at Sheikh Abu Naser Stadium in Khulna. The competition was introduced to prepare women cricketers for Test cricket and adapt themselves with the longer version of the game.

Then in 2024 BCB announced Women’s Bangladesh Cricket League will also have 4 teams like Men's Bangladesh Cricket League tournament. East Zone is one of the four teams along with North Zone, Central Zone and South Zone.

== Current squad ==
Name	Batting style	Bowling style
Batters
Sharmin Akhter	RHB	
Taj Nehar	RHB	right arm off break
Shampa Biswas		
Wicket-keepers
Dilara Akter	RHB	
Farzana Akter Boby	RHB	
All-rounders
Nasima Khatun	RHB	right arm off break
Shorifa Khatun	RHB	right arm off break
Bowlers
Fahima Khatun (c)	RHB	right arm leg break
Suraiya Azmin	RHB	right arm medium
Khadija Tul Kubra	RHB	right arm off break
Dipa Khatun	RHB	right arm off break
Ashrafi Yasmin	RHB	right arm medium fast
Jannatul Islam Tithi	RHB	right arm off break
Sabikun Nahar	RHB	left arm orthodox
Last Update = 17 December 2024
