= Women's Central Zone cricket team =

Bangladeshi cricket team

Women's Central Zone Cricket Team
- League: Women's Bangladesh Cricket League

Personnel
- Captain: Nigar Sultana
- Owner: BCB

Team information
- City: Dhaka Division; Mymensingh Division
- Founded: 2021
- Home ground: Sher-e-Bangla National Stadium, Dhaka
- Official website: Cricheroes
First-class kit

The Women's Central Zone cricket team is a women's first-class cricket team that represents the Central region of Bangladesh – the Dhaka Division and Mymensingh Division – in the Women's Bangladesh Cricket League (WBCL). It is a composite team of two Bangladeshi first-class women's cricket teams from south Bangladesh: Dhaka Division cricket team and Mymensingh Division cricket team.

== History ==
Following the success of Bangladesh in 2018 Women's Twenty20 Asia Cup, plans were going on to establish a two-day red-ball match for women since August 2018. In April 2021, the International Cricket Council awarded permanent women's Test status to Bangladesh women's national cricket team. The lack of a domestic first-class cricket competition for women prevented Bangladesh to start playing Test matches. The 2022–23 edition was the first-ever women's multi-day competition in Bangladesh, launched by the Bangladesh Cricket Board in March 2023. In March 2023, the tournament was inaugurated by BCB women's wing chairman Shafiul Alam Chowdhury Nadel, at Sheikh Abu Naser Stadium in Khulna. The competition was introduced to prepare women cricketers for Test cricket and adapt to the longer version of the game.

In 2024 BCB announced that Women’s Bangladesh Cricket League will also have 4 teams like Men's Bangladesh Cricket League tournament. Central Zone is one of the four teams along with North Zone, South Zone and East Zone.

== Current squad ==
Name	Batting style	Bowling style
Batters
Murshida Khatun	LHB	
Sharmin Akter	RHB	right arm off break
Sadiya Islam	RHB	right arm off break
Wicket-keepers
Nigar Sultana (C)	RHB	
Farzana Akter Liza	RHB	
All-rounders
Shorna Akter	RHB	right arm leg break
Disha Biswas	RHB	right arm medium fast
Lata Mondal	RHB	right arm medium
Riya Akter Shikha	RHB	right arm fast medium
Bowlers
Puja Chakraborty	RHB	right arm off break
Mumta Hena	RHB	right arm off break
Fuara Begum	RHB	right arm medium
Shuborna Karmokar		
Last Update = 17 December 2024
