= Women's South Zone cricket team =

Bangladeshi cricket team

Women's South Zone Cricket Team
- League: Women's Bangladesh Cricket League

Personnel
- Captain: Rabeya Khan
- Owner: BCB

Team information
- City: Barisal Division; Khulna Division
- Founded: 2021
- Home ground: Sheikh Abu Naser Stadium

History
- WBCL wins: 0
- Zonal One Day wins: 1
- Official website: Cricheroes
First-class kit

The Women's South Zone cricket team is a women's first-class cricket team that represents South of Bangladesh – the Barisal Division and Khulna Division – in the Women's Bangladesh Cricket League (WBCL). It is a composite team of two Bangladeshi first-class women's cricket teams from south Bangladesh: Barisal Division cricket team and Khulna Division cricket team.

== History ==
Following the success of Bangladesh in 2018 Women's Twenty20 Asia Cup, plans were going on to establish a two-day red-ball match for women since August 2018. In April 2021, the International Cricket Council awarded permanent women's Test status to Bangladesh women's national cricket team. The lack of a domestic first-class cricket competition for women prevented Bangladesh to start playing Test matches. The 2022–23 edition is the first-ever women's multi-day competition in Bangladesh, launched by the Bangladesh Cricket Board in March 2023. In March 2023, the tournament was inaugurated by the chairman of BCB women's wing Shafiul Alam Chowdhury Nadel, at Sheikh Abu Naser Stadium in Khulna. The competition was introduced to prepare women cricketers for Test cricket and adapt to the longer version of cricket.

In 2024, BCB announced that Women’s Bangladesh Cricket League will also have 4 teams like Men's Bangladesh Cricket League tournament. South Zone is one of the four teams along with North Zone, Central Zone and East Zone.

== Current squad ==
Name	Batting style	Bowling style
Batters
Bithi Parvin	RHB	
Unnoti Akter	RHB	
Rubya Haider	LHB	
Fayema Tuz Jahara	RHB	
Wicket-keepers
Shamima Sultana	RHB	
All-rounders
Rabeya Khan (C)	RHB	right arm leg break
Rumana Ahmed	RHB	right arm leg break
Ayasha Rahman	RHB	right arm off break
Salma Khatun	RHB	right arm off break
Bowlers
Leky Chakma	RHB	right arm fast medium
Rupa Roy	RHB	right arm medium
Prity Das	RHB	right arm medium
Sultana Khatun	RHB	right arm off break
Sanjida Akter Meghla	RHB	right arm orthodox
Last Update = 17 December 2024
