= 2024–25 Dhaka Premier Division Women's Cricket League =

Cricket tournament

- Dates: 19 February 2025 – March 2025
- Administrator: Bangladesh Cricket Board
- Cricket format: List A
- Tournament format: Round-robin
- Participants: 9
- Matches: 36

The 2024–25 Dhaka Premier Division Women's Cricket League (DPDWCL) is the annual edition of the Dhaka Premier Division Women's Cricket League, a List A cricket competition in Bangladesh. It is being contested by 9 club teams. The tournament started on 19 February 2025. Mohammedan Sporting Club Women's cricket team was champion of previous seasons.

== Teams and format ==
The competition is being played in round-robin format.

- Abahani Limited Women's cricket team
- Bangladesh Ansar & VDP Women's cricket team
- Bangladesh Police Cricket Club Women Cricket
- Bangladesh Krira Shikkha Protishthan Women's cricket team
- Gulshan Youth Club Women's cricket team
- Kalabagan Krira Chakra Women's cricket team
- Khelaghar Shamaj Kalyan Shamity Women's cricket team
- Mohammedan Sporting Club Women's cricket team
- Sheltech Cricket Academy Women's Cricket Team

== Points table ==
Pos	Team	Pld	W	L	T	NR	Pts	NRR
1	Sheltech Cricket Academy	5	5	0	0	0	10	1.992
2	Mohammedan Sporting Club	5	4	1	0	0	8	2.409
3	Abahani Limited	6	4	2	0	0	8	1.644
4	BKSP Womens	5	4	1	0	0	8	1.347
5	Gulshan Youth Club	6	4	2	0	0	8	0.255
6	Khalaghar Shamaj Kalyan Shamity	5	2	3	0	0	4	−0.897
7	Bangladesh Ansar & VDP	6	1	5	0	0	2	−2.368
8	Kalabagan Krira Chakra	5	0	5	0	0	0	−1.908
9	Bangladesh Police Cricket Club	5	0	5	0	0	0	−2.603

Updated to match(es) played on 5 March 2025. Source: Cricheroes

== Match Summary ==
Below is a summary of results for each team's nine regular season matches in chronological order. A team's opponent for any given match is listed above the margin of victory/defeat.

Team	League Stage								
Team	1	2	3	4	5	6	7	8	Pos
Abahani Limited (ABL)	2	2	4	4	6	8	?	?	-
Ansar & VDP (AVDP)	0	0	0	0	0	2	?	?	-
Bangladesh Police CC (BPCC)	0	0	0	0	0	?	?	?	-
BKSP Women's (BKSP)	2	4	4	6	8	?	?	?	-
Gulshan YC (GYC)	2	4	6	8	8	8	?	?	-
Kalabagan KC (KBKC)	0	0	0	0	0	?	?	?	-
Khelaghar SKS (KSKS)	0	2	4	4	4	?	?	?	-
Mohammedan SC (MSC)	0	2	4	6	8	?	?	?	-
Sheltech Cricket Academy (SCA)	2	4	6	8	10	?	?	?	-

Team's results→	Won	Tied	Lost	N/R
