= Bangladesh Women's Cricket League =

Cricket tournament

Women's Bangladesh Cricket League
- Countries: Bangladesh
- Administrator: Bangladesh Cricket Board
- Format: First-class
- First edition: 2022–23
- Latest edition: 2022–23
- Next edition: 2024–25
- Tournament format: Round-robin
- Number of teams: 4
- Current champion: Team Meghna
- Most successful: Team Meghna (1 title)

The Bangladesh Women's Cricket League is a women's domestic first-class cricket competition that takes place in Bangladesh. Each match is scheduled for up to two days. The first edition of the competition was held in 2022–23. The tournament sees three teams competing, each representing one of the three major rivers of Bangladesh.

== History ==
Following the success of Bangladesh in the 2018 Women's Twenty20 Asia Cup, plans were going on to establish a two-day red-ball match for women since August 2018. In April 2021, the International Cricket Council awarded permanent women's Test status to the Bangladesh women's national cricket team. The lack of a domestic first-class cricket competition for women prevented Bangladesh from starting to play Test matches. The 2022–23 edition is the first-ever women's multi-day competition in Bangladesh, launched by the Bangladesh Cricket Board in March 2023. The inaugural tournament was inaugurated by the chairman of BCB women's wing, Shafiul Alam Chowdhury Nadel, at Sheikh Abu Naser Stadium in Khulna. The competition was introduced to prepare women cricketers for Test cricket and help them adapt to the longer version of the game.

The first edition of the tournament took place from 30 March to 8 April 2023 in a round-robin format. All the matches ended in a draw, and thus the championship was clinched by Team Meghna in terms of quotient.

== Teams ==
=== Current teams ===
Team	Debut	Captain
Women's East Zone	2024–25	Fahima Khatun
Women's North Zone	2024–25	Sobhana Mostary
Women's South Zone	2024–25	Rabeya Khan
Women's Central Zone	2024–25	Nigar Sultana Jyoti

=== Defunct teams ===
Team	Debut	Dissolved
Team Jamuna	2022–23	2022–23
Team Meghna	2022–23	2022–23
Team Padma	2022–23	2022–23

== Overview ==
Season	Dates	Winners	Runners-up	Match format	Most runs	Most wickets	Ref
2022–23	30 March–8 April 2023	Team Meghna	Team Jamuna	2 days	Ritu Moni	Sanjida Akter Meghla	
