= 2022–23 Women's Bangladesh Cricket League =

2023 Women's Bangladesh Cricket League
- Dates: 30 March 2023 – 8 April 2023
- Administrator: Bangladesh Cricket Board
- Cricket format: Women's first-class
- Tournament format: Round-robin
- Champions: Team Meghna (1st title)
- Participants: 3
- Matches: 3
- Most runs: Ritu Moni (172)
- Most wickets: Nahida Akter (7)

The 2022–23 Women's Cricket League or Women's BCL 2022–23 was the first edition of the Women's Bangladesh Cricket League, a two-day first-class cricket competition in Bangladesh. The tournament began on 30 March 2023 and ended on 8th April 2023 at Sheikh Abu Naser Stadium in Khulna.

The championship was clinched by Team Meghna in terms of quotient.

== Teams ==
The Women's BCL consists of 3 teams, named after three of Bangladesh's major rivers, the Padma, Meghna and Jamuna:

- Team Jamuna
- Team Meghna
- Tema Padma

== Points table ==
| Team | Pld | W | L | D | A | Q | Pts |
|---|---|---|---|---|---|---|---|
| Team Meghna | 2 | 0 | 0 | 2 | 0 | 1.693 | 2 |
| Team Jamuna | 2 | 0 | 0 | 2 | 0 | 0.986 | 2 |
| Team Padma | 2 | 0 | 0 | 2 | 0 | 0.829 | 2 |

- Champions

Source=BCB

== Fixture ==
30-31 March 2023
Match 1
Scorecard

| Team Jamuna | v | Team Padma |
| 155 (66.0 overs) | | 152 (52.4 overs) |
| 212/3d (53.4 overs) | | 47/3 (19 overs) |

Drawn.
Sheikh Abu Naser Stadium, Khulna
Umpires: Syed Ashraful Islam and Shathira Jakir Jesy
Player of the match: Sanjida Akter (Team Jamuna)

- Team Padma won the toss and elected to field first

3-4 April 2023
Match 2
Scorecard

| Team Jamuna | v | Team Meghna |
| 175/7d (70 overs) | | 236/3d (70 overs) |
| 155/6 (54.4 overs) |

Drawn.
Sheikh Abu Naser Stadium, Khulna
Umpires: Shthira Jakir Jesy and Dolly Rani Sarkar
Player of the match: Shorna Akter (Team Jamuna)

- Team Jamuna won the toss and elected to bat first

7-8 April 2023
Match 3
Scorecard

| Team Padma | v | Team Meghna |
| 210/9d (70 overs) | | 150/5d (66.2 overs) |
| 258/6 (59.1 overs) |

Drawn.
Sheikh Abu Naser Stadium, Khulna
Umpires: Nazmul Ahsan and Shathira Jakir Jesy
Player of the match: Salma Khatun (Team Padma)

- Team Meghna won the toss and elected to field first
