= List of international cricket centuries by Tamim Iqbal =

Tamim Iqbal is a Bangladeshi international cricketer. He made his ODI debut in 2007 against Zimbabwe and Test debut against New Zealand in 2008. Tamim has scored centuries in all three formats of the game.

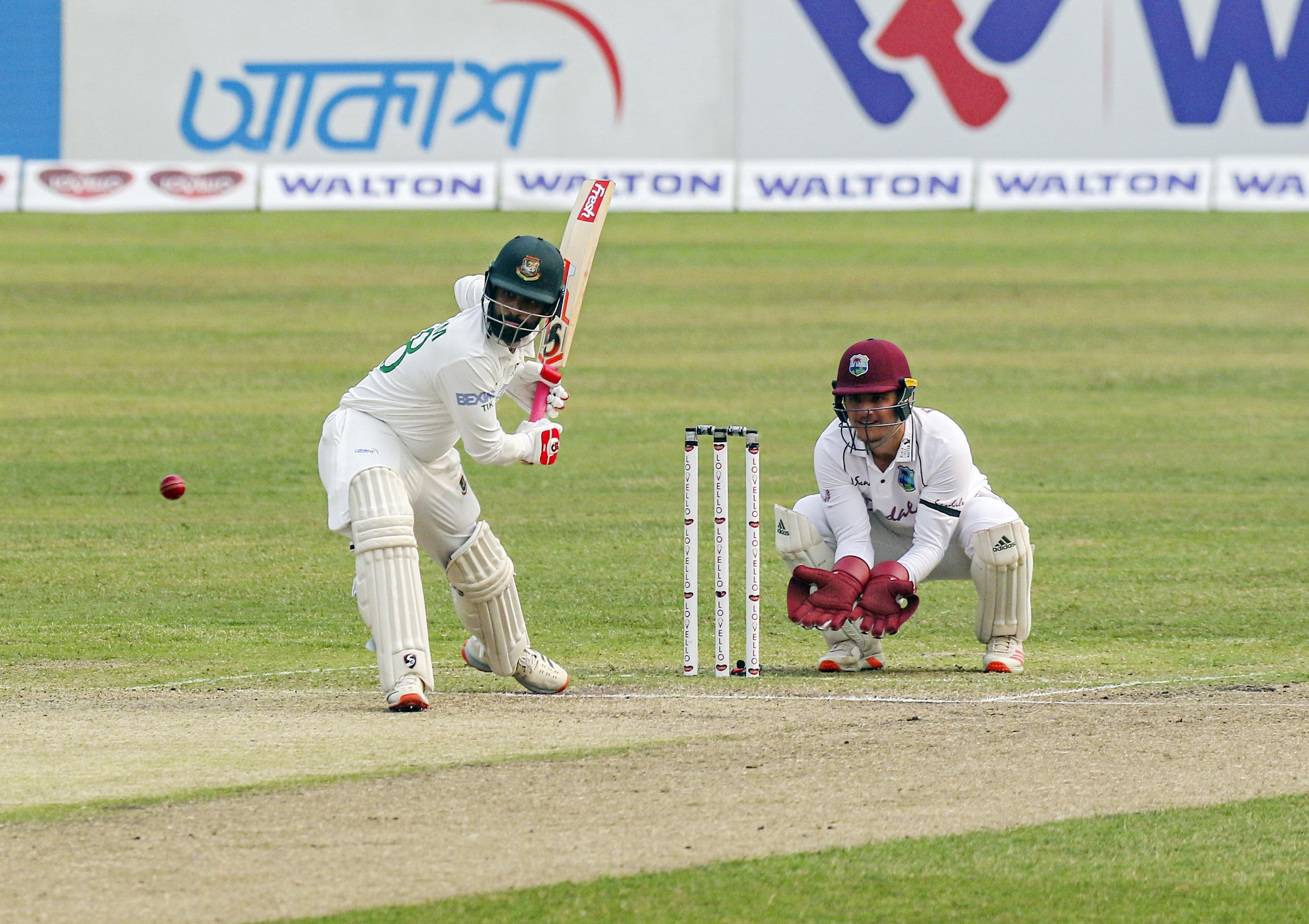
Iqbal batting against the West Indies in February 2021

On 22 March 2008, Tamim scored his first international century against Ireland in an ODI match played at Sher-e-Bangla National Cricket Stadium, which helped his team to sweep the ODI series by 3–0.

In July 2009, He scored his first test century at Arnos Vale Stadium in St. Vincent against West Indies in their second innings of the first test, helping his team to seal a victory against West Indies, which was their first test victory in an away match against any opponent except Zimbabwe.

On 13 March 2016, in the first round of 2016 ICC World Twenty20, he scored his first T20I century against Oman at HPCA Stadium, Dharmashala, being the first and only Bangladeshi batter so far to score a century in men's T20I cricket as well as at the ICC Men's T20 World Cup.

As of May 2022, Tamim is also Bangladesh's highest century maker in international matches with 25 centuries, combining all forms of cricket.

== Key ==
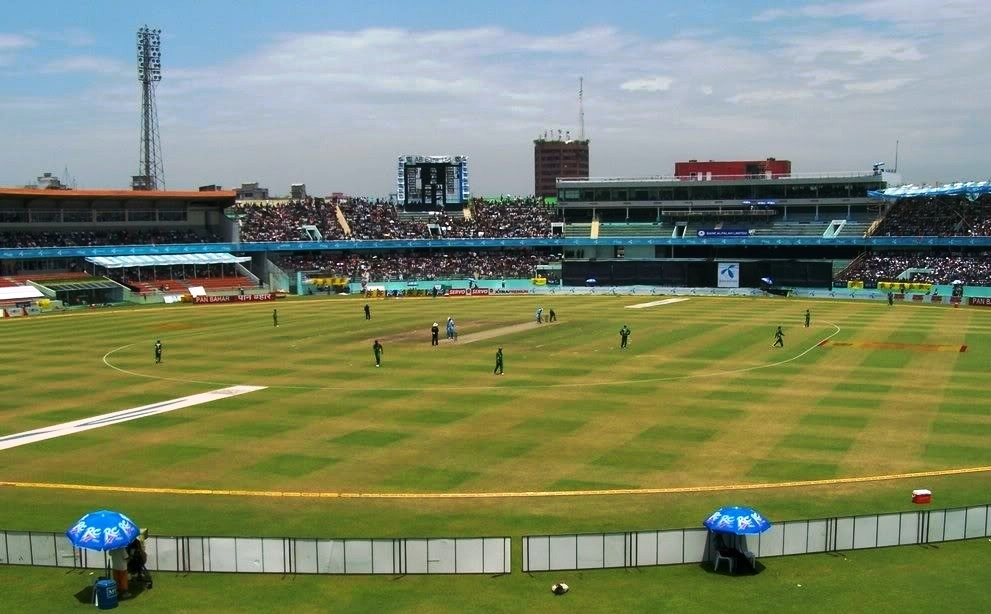
Sher-e-Bangla National Cricket Stadium, where Tamim scored his most centuries (7) and most runs in all format

Symbol	Meaning
*	Remained not out
†	Man of the match
Pos.	Position in the batting order
Inn.	The innings of the match
S/R	Strike rate during the innings
H/A/N	Venue was at home (Bangladesh), away or neutral
Date	Match starting day
Lost	The match was lost by Bangladesh
Won	The match was won by Bangladesh
Drawn	The match was drawn

== Test cricket centuries ==
Test centuries scored by Tamim Iqbal
No.	Score	Against	Pos.	Inn.	Test	Venue	H/A/N	Date	Result	Ref
1	128 †	West Indies	1	3	1/2	Arnos Vale Stadium, St. Vincent	Away	9 July 2009	Won	
2	151	India	1	3	2/2	Sher-e-Bangla National Cricket Stadium, Mirpur	Home	24 January 2010	Lost	
3	103	England	1	3	1/2	Lord's, London	Away	27 May 2010	Lost	
4	108	England	1	2	2/2	Old Trafford, Manchester	Away	4 June 2010	Lost	
5	109	Zimbabwe	1	1	2/3	Sheikh Abu Naser Stadium, Khulna	Home	3 November 2014	Won	
6	109	Zimbabwe	1	1	3/3	Zohur Ahmed Chowdhury Stadium, Chittagong	Home	12 November 2014	Won	
7	206 †	Pakistan	1	3	1/2	Sheikh Abu Naser Stadium, Khulna	Home	28 April 2015	Drawn	
8	104	England	1	1	2/2	Sher-e-Bangla National Cricket Stadium, Mirpur	Home	28 October 2016	Won	
9	126	New Zealand	1	1	1/3	Seddon Park, Hamilton	Away	28 February 2019	Lost	
10	133	Sri Lanka	1	2	1/2	Zohur Ahmed Chowdhury Stadium, Chattogram	Home	15 May 2022	Drawn	

== ODI centuries ==
One Day International centuries scored by Tamim Iqbal
No.	Score	Against	Pos.	Inn.	S/R	Venue	H/A/N	Date	Result	Ref
1	129 †	Ireland	1	1	154.85	Sher-e-Bangla National Cricket Stadium, Mirpur	Home	22 March 2008	Won	
2	154 †	Zimbabwe	1	2	111.59	Queens Sports Club, Bulawayo	Away	16 August 2009	Won	
3	125 †	England	1	1	104.16	Sher-e-Bangla National Cricket Stadium, Mirpur	Home	28 February 2010	Lost	
4	112	Sri Lanka	1	1	82.35	Mahinda Rajapaksa Stadium, Sooriyawewa	Away	23 March 2013	Lost	
5	132	Pakistan	1	1	97.77	Sher-e-Bangla National Cricket Stadium, Mirpur	Home	17 April 2015	Won	
6	116* †	Pakistan	1	2	100.00	Sher-e-Bangla National Cricket Stadium, Mirpur	Home	19 April 2015	Won	
7	118 †	Afghanistan	1	1	100.00	Sher-e-Bangla National Cricket Stadium, Mirpur	Home	1 October 2016	Won	
8	127 †	Sri Lanka	1	1	89.43	Rangiri Dambulla International Stadium, Dambulla	Away	25 March 2017	Won	
9	128	England	1	1	90.14	The Oval, London	Away	1 June 2017	Lost	
10	130* †	West Indies	1	1	81.25	Providence Stadium, Guyana	Away	22 July 2018	Won	
11	103 †	West Indies	1	1	83.06	Warner Park, Basseterre	Away	28 July 2018	Won	
12	158 †	Zimbabwe	1	1	116.18	Sylhet International Cricket Stadium, Sylhet	Home	3 March 2020	Won	
13	128*	Zimbabwe	1	1	117.43	Sylhet International Cricket Stadium, Sylhet	Home	6 March 2020	Won	
14	112	Zimbabwe	1	2	115.46	Harare Sports Club, Harare	Away	20 July 2021	Won	

== T20I centuries ==
Twenty20 International centuries scored by Tamim Iqbal
No.	Score	Against	Pos.	Inn.	S/R	Venue	H/A/N	Date	Result	Ref
1	103* †	Oman	1	1	163.49	HPCA Stadium, Dharamshala	Neutral	13 March 2016	Won	
