= South Africa women's cricket team in Bangladesh in 2016–17 =

South African women's cricket team in Bangladesh in 2016–17
| | Bangladesh Women | South Africa women |
- Dates: 12 – 20 January 2017
| Captains | Rumana Ahmed | Dane van Niekerk |

One Day International series
- Results: South Africa women won the 5-match series 4–1
| Most runs | Rumana Ahmed (142) | Lizelle Lee (268) |
| Most wickets | Khadija Tul Kubra (11) | Suné Luus (7) |
- Player of the series: Lizelle Lee (SA)

South African women toured Bangladesh in January 2017. The tour consisted of a series of five Women's One Day Internationals (WODIs). South African women were previously scheduled to tour Bangladesh in October 2015 to play three WODIs and four Women's Twenty20 Internationals (WT20Is), but the tour was abandoned over "personal security concerns", with no official statement from either BCB or CSA.

South Africa women won the series 4–1.

== Squads ==
| Bangladesh | South Africa |
|---|---|
| Rumana Ahmed (c); Jahanara Alam; Fargana Hoque; Khadija Tul Kubra; Lata Mondal; Nahida Akter; Nigar Sultana; Nuzhat Tasnia; Panna Ghosh; Ritu Moni; Salma Khatun; Sanjida Islam; Shaila Sharmin; Sharmin Akhter; Sharmin Sultana; Suraiya Azmin | Dane van Niekerk (c); Moseline Daniels; Mignon du Preez; Yolani Fourie; Lara Goodall; Sinalo Jafta; Marizanne Kapp; Ayabonga Khaka; Odine Kirsten; Lizelle Lee; Marcia Matshipi Letsoalo; Suné Luus; Andrie Steyn; Chloe Tryon |

== WODI series ==
=== 1st WODI ===
12 January 2017
Scorecard

| South Africa; 251/3 (50 overs) | v | Bangladesh; 165/6 (50 overs) |
| Lizelle Lee 87 (71); Salma Khatun 2/30 (4 overs) | | Nigar Sultana 59* (90); Suné Luus 3/52 (10 overs) |

South Africa Women won by 86 runs
Sheikh Kamal International Cricket Stadium, Cox's Bazar
Umpires: Gazi Sohel (Ban) and Masudur Rahman (Ban)
Player of the match: Lizelle Lee (SA)

- Bangladesh Women won the toss and elected to field.

=== 2nd WODI ===
14 January 2017
Scorecard

| South Africa; 223 (49 overs) | v | Bangladesh; 206/8 (50 overs) |
| Lizelle Lee 70 (57); Khadija Tul Kubra 4/56 (10 overs) | | Sharmin Akhter 74 (127); Suné Luus 2/31 (10 overs) |

South Africa Women won by 17 runs
Sheikh Kamal International Cricket Stadium, Cox's Bazar
Umpires: Mahfuzur Rahman (Ban) and Masudur Rahman (Ban)
Player of the match: Lizelle Lee (SA)

- South Africa Women won the toss and elected to bat.

=== 3rd WODI ===
16 January 2017
Scorecard

| Bangladesh; 136 (49 overs) | v | South Africa; 126 (31.2 overs) |
| Rumana Ahmed 28 (48); Dane van Niekerk 2/18 (7 overs) | | Lizelle Lee 46 (31); Khadija Tul Kubra 4/33 (10 overs) |

Bangladesh Women won by 10 runs
Sheikh Kamal International Cricket Stadium, Cox's Bazar
Umpires: Gazi Sohel (Ban) and Masudur Rahman (Ban)
Player of the match: Khadija Tul Kubra (Ban)

- Bangladesh Women won the toss and elected to bat.
- Sharmin Sultana (Bangladesh Women) made her WODI debut.

=== 4th WODI ===
18 January 2017
Scorecard

| South Africa; 251/7 (50 overs) | v | Bangladesh; 157 (50 overs) |
| Mignon du Preez 79 (108); Khadija Tul Kubra 3/48 (10 overs) | | Fargana Hoque 67 (144); Ayabonga Khaka 3/34 (10 overs) |

South Africa Women won by 94 runs
Sheikh Kamal International Cricket Stadium, Cox's Bazar
Umpires: Anisur Rahman (Ban) and Tanvir Ahmed (Ban)
Player of the match: Mignon du Preez (SA)

- South Africa Women won the toss and elected to bat.

=== 5th WODI ===
20 January 2017
Scorecard

| Bangladesh; 68 (36.3 overs) | v | South Africa; 69/2 (10 overs) |
| Sharmin Sultana 13 (28); Odine Kirsten 4/10 (10 overs) | | Lizelle Lee 37 (19); Rumana Ahmed 1/13 (3 overs) |

South Africa Women won by 8 wickets
Sheikh Kamal International Cricket Stadium, Cox's Bazar
Umpires: Anisur Rahman (Ban) and Mahfuzur Rahman (Ban)
Player of the match: Odine Kirsten (SA)

- Bangladesh Women won the toss and elected to bat.
