= A. N. M. Yusuf =

Bangladeshi politician

- এ. এন. এম. ইউসুফ

Member of the Bangladesh Parliament for Moulvibazar-2
- In office 1986–1988
- Preceded by: Position established
- Succeeded by: Nawab Ali Abbas Khan

Personal details
- Born: 1918 Daudpur, Kulaura, Sylhet District, Assam Province
- Died: 22 October 2009 (aged 90–91) Rushmono Clinic, Maghbazar, Dhaka, Bangladesh
- Party: Bangladesh Muslim League
- Spouse: Lutfunnahar
- Children: 2

A. N. M. Yusuf was a Bangladesh Muslim League politician, poet, writer and a former member of parliament for Moulvibazar-2.

== Early life ==
Yusuf was born and raised in the village of Daudpur in Kulaura, Sylhet District, Assam Province, British India. He was raised in a wealthy Bengali Muslim family and completed Hajj later on in his life. He studied in Sylhet Government High School before completing his BA, LLB and MA at the University of Dhaka. During his time in high school, he was deputy commander for the Sylhet City Green Force - an affiliated branch of the All-India Muslim League. He was also one of the leaders of the All-India Muslim Students Federation's Assam branch.

== Career ==
During the Sylhet referendum movement in 1947, Yusuf volunteered as a local captain for the All-India Muslim League. He was also a councillor for the Muslim League during the Partition of India.

During the 1964 East Pakistan riots, Yusuf was a summoner for the New Town Peace Committee. In 1968, he became the secretary of the Dhaka National Medical College Hospital for three years. He also started a law business in Dhaka as a qualified advocate. He served as the elected president of Dhaka Attorney Bar Association, Pakistan Attorney Bar Association, Bangladesh Attorney Bar Association and Dhaka Metropolitan Bar Association. He was also a member of Moulvibazar District Bar Association, Narsingdi District Bar Association and Gazipur District Bar Association. As the leader of the Lawyers Coordinating Council, which is made up of various organisations, he played an important role towards the demands of lawyers. He convened and presided over the Law Convention convened in Dhaka in December 1969 in protest of the Reform Ordinance.

Following the Assam Line movement, he wrote a poem on Ikhlas, a protester who violated Section 144 and died. He also wrote a poem on the assassination of Mahatma Gandhi. He was also published a monthly, known as Foriyad, where he would write about history and politics.

On 14 February 1971, he was elected as the general secretary for the East Pakistan Provincial (Convention) Muslim League. Following the Independence of Bangladesh, he became vice-president for the Bangladesh Muslim League. He was imprisoned from 1972 to 1974 for political reasons. In 1979, he became vice-president of Dhaka National Medical College Hospital's governing body until 1981. During his time in Dhaka, he was the founder convener of the Kulaura Samiti. He was also associated with the Jalalabad Association from its inception and the elected president of the New Market Hawkers Association. As the acting secretary of the Sylhet Flood Relief Committee formed by the Jalalabad Association, he showed his skills as a fearless social worker.

Yusuf helped towards the establishment of many schools such as Kulaura Model College, Jalaliya Aliya Madrasa, Chowdhury Bazar Hafizia Madrasa, Sripur Yusuf-Ghani High School and College, Langla Modern College, Abu Nasir Shah College in addition to a number of orphanages and mosques. He also donated towards Jagannath University, Dhaka Metropolitan Bar Gazipur, Narsingdi District Bar Association.

Yusuf took part in the elections of 1962, 1965 and 1979 as a representative of Kulaura. He was elected to parliament from Moulvibazar-2 as a Bangladesh Muslim League candidate in 1986.

== Death ==
Yusuf died on 22 October 2009 at the Rushmono Clinic in Maghbazar, Dhaka.
