= 2023–24 Dhaka Premier Division Women's Cricket League =

Cricket tournament

- Dates: 17 May 2024 – 11 June 2024
- Administrator: Bangladesh Cricket Board
- Cricket format: List A
- Tournament format: Round-robin
- Champions: Mohammedan Sporting Club
- Participants: 10
- Matches: 45
- Most runs: Murshida Khatun Happy (446)
- Most wickets: Jahanara Alam (25)

The 2023–24 Dhaka Premier Division Women's Cricket League (DPDWCL) is the annual edition of the Dhaka Premier Division Women's Cricket League, a List A cricket competition in Bangladesh. It is being contested by 10 club teams. The tournament started on 17 May 2024. Player signings took place on 12 and 13 May 2024.

== Teams and format ==
The competition was played in round-robin format.

- Abahani Limited Women's cricket team
- Bangladesh Ansar & VDP Women's cricket team
- Bangladesh Krira Shikkha Protishthan Women's cricket team
- City Club Women's cricket team
- Gulshan Youth Club Women's cricket team
- Jabid Ahsan Sohel Cricket Club Women's cricket team
- Kalabagan Krira Chakra Women's cricket team
- Khelaghar Shamaj Kalyan Shamity Women's cricket team
- Mohammedan Sporting Club Women's cricket team
- Rupali Bank Krira Parishad Women's cricket team

== Points table ==
Pos	Team	Pld	W	L	T	NR	Pts	NRR	Qualification
1	Mohammedan Sporting Club (C)	9	9	0	0	0	18	3.064	
2	Abahani Limited	9	8	1	0	0	16	2.911	
3	Rupali Bank Krira Parishad	9	7	2	0	0	14	1.556	
4	BKSP Women's	9	6	3	0	0	12	0.411	
5	Khalaghar Shamaj Kalyan Shamity	9	3	5	0	1	7	−0.824	
6	Kalabagan Krira Chakra	9	3	6	0	0	6	−0.372	
7	Gulshan Youth Club	9	3	6	0	0	6	−0.963	
8	Bangladesh Ansar & VDP	9	2	6	0	1	5	−0.274	
9	City Club	9	2	6	0	1	5	−2.817	Advance to Relegation League
10	Jabid Ahsan Sohel CC	9	0	8	0	1	1	−4.347	Advance to Relegation League

Updated to match(es) played on 13 June 2024. Source: Cricheroes

Team declared as a Champion of the tournament.

== Match summary ==
Below is a summary of results for each team's nine regular season matches in chronological order. A team's opponent for any given match is listed above the margin of victory/defeat.

Team	League Stage									
Team	1	2	3	4	5	6	7	8	9	Pos
Abahani Limited (ABL)	2	4	6	8	8	10	12	14	16	2nd place, silver medalist(s)
Ansar & VDP (AVDP)	0	0	2	3	5	5	5	5	5	8th
BKSP Women's (BKSP)	0	2	4	4	4	6	8	10	12	4th
City Club (CC)	0	0	1	1	3	3	3	3	5	9th
Gulshan YC (GYC)	0	2	2	2	4	4	6	6	6	7th
Jabid Ahsan Sohel (JAS)	0	0	0	1	1	1	1	1	1	10th
Kalabagan KC (KBKC)	2	2	2	2	4	6	6	6	8	5th
Khelaghar SKS (KSKS)	2	2	2	3	5	5	5	7	7	6th
Mohammedan SC (MSC)	2	4	6	8	10	12	14	16	18	1st place, gold medalist(s)
Rupali Bank KP (RBKP)	2	4	6	8	10	10	12	14	14	3rd place, bronze medalist(s)

Team's results→	Won	Tied	Lost	N/R
