= National Medical College =

National Medical College may refer to:

- Calcutta National Medical College, India
- Dhaka National Medical College, Bangladesh
- George Washington University Medical School, formerly the National Medical College of Columbian University, Washington, DC, US
- National Medical College, Birgunj, Nepal
