= Hazipur Union (disambiguation) =

Hazipur Union may refer to:

- Hazipur Union (Magura District)
- Hazipur Union, Kulaura (Moulvibazar District)
