= D3 Trophy =

Bangladeshi Cricket Tournament

- Countries: Bangladesh
- Administrator: Bangladesh Cricket Board
- Format: First-class; Twenty20; List A
- First edition: 2026–27
- Next edition: 2027–28
- Number of teams: 6
- 2026–27 D3 Trophy

The D3 Trophy (also known as Domestic-3 Trophy) is a franchise-based multi-format domestic cricket tournament organized by the Bangladesh Cricket Board (BCB). the tournament combines Twenty20 (T20), List A and first-class cricket under a single tournament.

The competition features six franchises owned by corporate groups under three-year agreements with the BCB. Its inaugural season is scheduled to begin with the T20 competition in December 2026, followed by the four-day and one-day competitions in 2027.

== History ==
The Bangladesh Cricket Board announced the D3 Trophy in September 2026 as part of an initiative to revitalise the country's domestic cricket structure. BCB president Tamim Iqbal said the competition was intended to restore public interest in domestic cricket and improve its competitiveness.

The tournament brings together three existing competitions: the National Cricket League (NCL) T20, the Bangladesh Cricket League (BCL) four-day competition and the BCL one-day competition. The four-day National Cricket League remains a separate competition.

== Format ==
The D3 Trophy consists of three competitions played under the same franchise structure:

  - Twenty20: The opening competition of the inaugural season, scheduled to begin on 15 December 2026.
  - Four-day cricket: The first-class component, scheduled for January 2027.
  - One-day cricket: The List A component, scheduled for May 2027.

The inaugural season is planned to comprise 42 matches: 19 T20 matches, 16 one-day matches and seven four-day matches.

== Teams ==
Six franchises were announced for the inaugural season. Each franchise signed a three-year agreement with the BCB.

D3 Trophy franchises
Franchise	Owner	Icon player
Walton	Walton Group	Mehidy Hasan Miraz
Fortune	Fortune Group	Towhid Hridoy
ACME	ACME Group	Mosaddek Hossain
Seven Rings Cement	Seven Rings Cement	Mushfiqur Rahim
ACE Blue Star	H. Bluestar	Nurul Hasan
Citizens Bank	Citizens Bank	Mohammad Naim

== Auctions and personnel signings ==
=== Marquee signings ===
Six icon players were selected for the six franchises ahead of the inaugural D3 Trophy season.

- Walton: Mehidy Hasan Miraz
- Fortune: Towhid Hridoy
- ACME: Mosaddek Hossain
- Seven Rings Cement: Mushfiqur Rahim
- ACE Blue Star: Nurul Hasan Sohan
- Citizens Bank: Naim Sheikh

=== Team management ===
The D3 Trophy introduced a management draft to select coaches and support staff for its six franchises. The draft included the selection of head coaches, assistant coaches, physiotherapists, strength and conditioning coaches, and analysts. Team owners were responsible for appointing other support staff in accordance with Bangladesh Cricket Board (BCB) regulations.

=== Head coaches ===
The six franchises selected their head coaches through a management draft ahead of the inaugural season.

Head coaches of D3 Trophy franchises
Team	Head coach
Walton	Abdur Razzak
Fortune	Mohammad Salahuddin
ACME	Rajin Saleh
Seven Rings Cement	Talha Jubair
ACE Blue Star	Sohel Islam
Citizens Bank	Mizanur Rahman Babul

=== Player auction ===
The D3 Trophy introduced a points-based player auction instead of conventional money-based bidding. Each franchise received a fixed points budget to assemble its squad, while player match fees were determined separately under Bangladesh Cricket Board (BCB) regulations. Each franchise was required to select 22 players at the auction in addition to its previously assigned icon player, completing a 23-player squad.

The players were divided into five categories, from Category A to Category E. The category-wise list published before the auction initially included 269 cricketers, with several Bangladesh national team players listed in Category A.

Indian sports presenter and auctioneer Charu Sharma was scheduled to conduct the inaugural auction on 26 October 2026 in Dhaka. Sharma had previously conducted auctions for the Indian Premier League (IPL).

The auction was held on 26 October 2026, with six franchises selecting players for the inaugural season. Reports stated that 275 players were available for bidding and that each franchise had a budget of 10 crore points, giving the six franchises a combined budget of 60 crore points.

Bangladesh fast bowler Shoriful Islam attracted the highest bid, joining Citizens Bank for 2.3 crore points. Taskin Ahmed was acquired by Walton for 2.1 crore points, while Tanzid Hasan Tamim joined Fortune for 2 crore points. Najmul Hossain Shanto and Litton Das were each acquired for 1.55 crore points.

The base values ranged from 5 lakh points for Category E to 40 lakh points for Category A. The points-based system was used for player selection rather than as a direct measure of players' match fees.
