= Kala Pahar =

Peak in northern Bangladesh

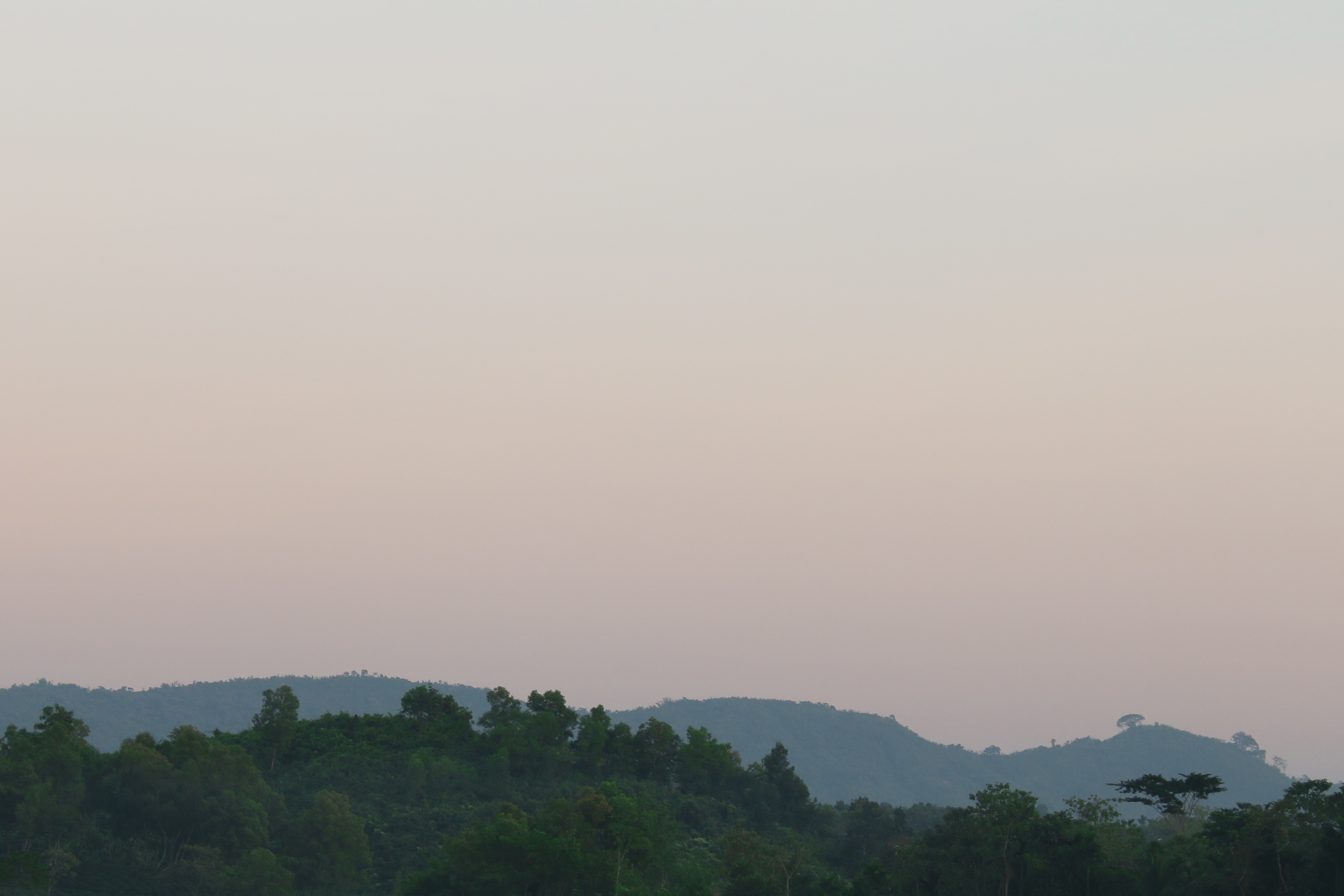
- Kala Pahar

Highest point
- Elevation: 334.67 m (1,098.0 ft)
- Coordinates: 24°24′35″N 92°4′47″E

Geography
- Location within Bangladesh
- Location: Kulaura, Sylhet, Bangladesh
- Parent range: Longla / Hararganj hill.

Geology
- Mountain type: Hill

Kala Pahar (Bengali: কালা পাহাড়, lit. 'Black mountain'), also known as Debbarma Haphong in Khasi, is the highest peak of northern Bangladesh. Located in Kulaura Upazila in Moulvibazar District, it is only three to four hours trekking distance from Azgarabad Tea Estate. This peak is also accessible from Rajki Tea Estate near Fultola Bazar of Juri Upazila.

== Etymology ==
The hill range of Kala Pahar is locally known as Longla Range. 'Kala Pahar' is the local name of the highest peak. According to Bangladesh Geographical Society, this hill is also known as Hararganj Pahar.

== Description ==
Situated in the north-eastern part of the country, 60% of the range is in Bangladesh and the rest is in northern Tripura in India. In Tripura, part of this hill is known as Raghunandan Pahar.

The ancient religious and archaeological site of India Unakoti, lies at the foot of this hill. Kala Pahar is about 1,100 feet high from the sea level.

In November 2015, members of a local adventure group of Bangladesh BD Explorer explored this peak and measured the highest point as 1,098 feet (from sea level) with a Garmin handheld GPS.

During autumn, if the sky is clear, one can observe Hakaluki haor from the peak of Kala Pahar. There are some Khasi establishments adjacent to this hill, such as Nunchora Punji, Panaichora Punji, Putichora Punji and Baigonchora Punji.

This place is popular among nature lovers to visit as an adventure day trip.

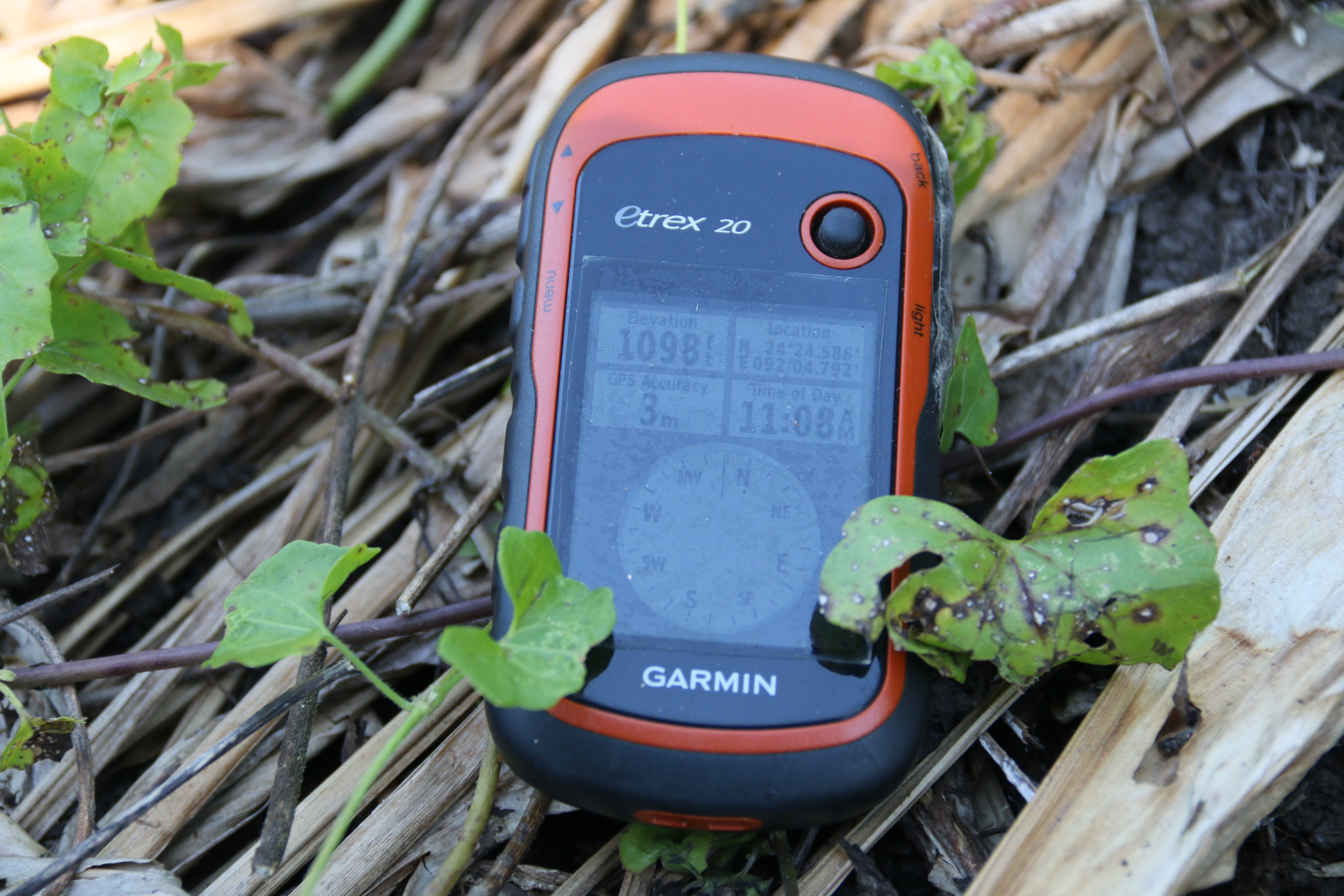
GPS reading at the top of Kala Pahar

== See also ==
- Geography of Bangladesh
- List of countries by highest point
- List of mountains of Bangladesh
