= Muntaqim =

Arabic Muslim given name

Muntaqim منتقم
- Gender: Male
- Language: Arabic

Origin
- Language: Arabic
- Origin: Names of God in Islam
- Meaning: Dominant, Determiner
- Region of origin: Asia

Muntaqim or Muntaquim (Arabic: منتقم) is a male Arabic Muslim given name. It is built from the Arabic word Muntaqim. The name means "Avenger", al-Muntaqim being one of the names of God in the Qur'an, which give rise to the Muslim theophoric names.

Notable people with the name include:

- Abdul Muntaquim Chaudhury (born 1929), Bangladeshi politician
- Abdul Muntaqim ibni Al-Muhtadee Billah (born 2007), Prince of Brunei and footballer
