= K. Z. Islam =

KZ Islam
- Born: Kamal Ziaul Islam; Mymensingh, British India
- Died: May 3, 2021
- Education: University of Calcutta, University of Leeds
- Occupations: Chartered Accountant, Entrepreneur, Cricket Administrator, Writer
- Known for: Former President of Bangladesh Cricket Control Board
- Children: 4 sons
- Parent(s): Khan Bahadur Sirajul Islam, Rahat Ara Begum

Kamal Ziaul Islam (known as KZ Islam) was a Bangladeshi chartered accountant, entrepreneur, philanthropist, sports administrator, and writer. He was the President of the Bangladesh Cricket Board and held other roles, including President of the Institute of Chartered Accountants of Bangladesh and Gulshan Club. He organized the Nirman School Cricket Tournament and Siraj Memorial College Tournament.

== Early life ==
Islam was born in Mymensingh as one of eight siblings. His father, Khan Bahadur Sirajul Islam, and his mother, Rahat Ara Begum, were well-known figures. In 1947, following the Partition of India, he completed his secondary education at Lawrence College Ghora Gali, and after a brief stint at the Royal Indian Military College.

Islam earned his BSc in Chemistry from the University of Calcutta in 1955 and later completed a BCom at the University of Leeds in 1960. He qualified as a Chartered Accountant in 1962 and held several professional roles in the UK before returning to Bangladesh in 1964.

== Career ==
Upon returning to Bangladesh, Islam embarked on a career as a Chartered Accountant. In 1971, he moved to Dhaka from Chittagong and worked in various public sector corporations.

In 1976, Islam founded Nirman International Limited, a construction firm that later diversified into power, telecom, real estate, and other sectors. His firm built the first 32-storey skyscraper for Bangladesh Bank in 1985. From 1981 to 1982, he was the general secretary of the Bangladesh Cricket Board (then called Bangladesh Cricket Control Board). In 1982, he established the Nirman School Cricket Tournament to promote youth cricket in the country. From 30 January 1983 to 18 February 1987, he served as the fourth president of the Bangladesh Cricket Board. He founded the Premier Cricket League. He was the President of Azad Boys Club in 1986.

Islam was President of the Ramblers Club from 1975 until his death. He created the Nirman XI cricket team for the Dhaka Premier League, led by Khaled Mahmud Sujon. He paid for the team to tour English in the 1990s. In 2001, he was awarded the National Sports Award. He was the Chairman of the Development Committee of Bangladesh Football Federation in 2003.

Islam was a patron of several philanthropic initiatives, including Shishu Polli, an NGO for marginalized women. He authored Glimpses of the Great (2012) and completed a comprehensive manuscript titled The Mountbattens and the Partition of India. In 2018, Iraj Waliullah, son of poet Syed Waliullah, claimed Islam, cousin of Syed Waliullah, misappropriated his residence in Gulshan. Iraj filed a complaint with Dhaka Metropolitan Magistrate's Court against Islam, Khadija Islam, his wife, and Rayyan Kamal, his son.

== Personal life ==
Islam was married to Khadija Islam. They had two sons, Rahat Kamal and Rayyan Kamal.

== Death ==
Islam died on 3 May 2021 in his home in Gulshan, Dhaka. At the age of 86. Based on this, his birth year is approximately 1934 or 1935. He was buried in Banani graveyard. Nazmul Hasan Papon, the president of the Bangladesh Cricket Board, expressed his condolences, and flags were lowered at the Sher-e-Bangla National Cricket Stadium.
