= Moulvibazar-2 =

Constituency of Bangladesh's Jatiya Sangsad

Coordinates: 24.52°N 92.03°E

- Constituency for the Jatiya Sangsad
- District: Moulvibazar District
- Division: Sylhet Division
- Electorate: 241,169 (2018)

Current constituency
- Created: 1984
- Party: Bangladesh Nationalist Party
- Member: Md Shawkatul Islam
- ← 235 Moulvibazar-1 237 Moulvibazar-3 →

Moulvibazar-2 is a constituency represented in the Jatiya Sangsad (National Parliament) of Bangladesh since 2026 by Md Shawkatul Islam of the Bangladesh Nationalist Party.

== Boundaries ==
The constituency encompasses Kulaura Upazila.

== History ==
The constituency was created in 1984 from a Sylhet constituency when the former Sylhet District was split into four districts: Sunamganj, Sylhet, Moulvibazar, and Habiganj.

Ahead of the 2008 general election, the Election Commission redrew constituency boundaries to reflect population changes revealed by the 2001 Bangladesh census. The 2008 redistricting altered the boundaries of the constituency.

Ahead of the 2018 general election, the Election Commission reduced the boundaries of the constituency by removing four union parishads of Kamalganj Upazila: Adampur, Alinagar, Islampur, and Shamshernagar.

== Members of Parliament ==
Election	Member	Party
1986	A. N. M. Yusuf	Muslim League
1988	Nawab Ali Abbas Khan	Jatiya Party
Feb 1996	MM Shahin	Bangladesh Nationalist Party
June 1996	Sultan Md. Mansur Ahmed	Awami League
2001	MM Shahin	Independent
2008	Nawab Ali Abbas Khan	Jatiya Party (Ershad)
2014	Abdul Matin	Independent
2018	Sultan Md. Mansur Ahmad	Gano Forum
2024	Shafiul Alam Chowdhury Nadel	Awami League
2026	Md Shawkatul Islam	Bangladesh Nationalist Party

== Elections ==
=== Elections in the 2010s ===
General Election 2018: Moulvibazar-2
Party	Symbol	Candidate	Votes	%	±pp
Gano Forum	Sheaf of paddy	Sultan Muhammed Mansur Ahmed	79,742	50.21	N/A
BDB	Boat	M. M. Shahin	77,170	48.59	N/A
JaPa(E)	Plough	Md. Mahbubul Alam	834	0.53	N/A
IAB	Hand fan	Md. Matiur Rahman	635	0.40	N/A
IOJ	Minaret	Aslam Hossain Rahmani	222	0.14	N/A
RWPB	Hoe	Prashanta Deb Chhana Ruhel	209	0.13	N/A
Valid votes			158,812	97.71	
Invalid votes			3,723	2.29	
Total votes			162,535	100.0	
Registered voters/turnout			241,170	67.39	▲47.10
Majority			2,572	1.62	
Gano Forum gain from Independent					

General Election 2014: Moulvibazar-2
Party	Candidate	Votes	%	±%
Independent	Abdul Matin	30,871	55.0	N/A
JP(E)	Mohibul Kadir Chowdhury	25,241	45.0	−16.6
Majority		5,630	10.0	−21.0
Turnout		56,112		
Independent gain from JP(E)				

=== Elections in the 2000s ===
General Election 2008: Moulvibazar-2
Party	Candidate	Votes	%	±%
JP(E)	Nawab Ali Abbas Khan	130,941	61.6	N/A
Independent	MM Shahin	64,942	30.5	−15.0
BNP	A. N. M. Abed Raza	14,105	6.6	N/A
BKM	Bodoruddin	1,283	0.6	N/A
AL	Ataur Rahman Shamim	1,238	0.6	N/A
BML	Md. Achkir Mia	160	0.1	N/A
Majority		65,999	31.0	+27.0
Turnout		212,669	85.1	+5.2
JP(E) gain from Independent				

General Election 2001: Moulvibazar-2
Party	Candidate	Votes	%	±%
Independent	MM Shahin	78,667	45.5	N/A
AL	Sultan Md. Mansur Ahmed	71,803	41.5	+2.2
Jamaat	Shafiqur Rahman	12,415	7.2	+3.4
IJOF	Md Shawkatul Islam	7,312	4.2	N/A
Independent	Emadul Islam	852	0.5	N/A
Independent	Abdus Sobhan	836	0.5	N/A
CPB	Khandokar Lutfar Rahman	576	0.3	N/A
JSD	Rezaur Rahman Chowdhury	296	0.2	N/A
Independent	A. N. M. Yusuf	122	0.1	N/A
Majority		6,864	4.0	−5.4
Turnout		172,879	79.9	+4.4
Independent gain from AL				

=== Elections in the 1990s ===
General Election June 1996: Moulvibazar-2
Party	Candidate	Votes	%	±%
AL	Sultan Md. Mansur Ahmed	52,582	39.3	0.0
JP(E)	Nawab Ali Abbas Khan	39,992	29.9	−22.8
BNP	MM Shahin	31,304	23.4	+18.8
Jamaat	Khandaker Abdus Sobahan	5,110	3.8	N/A
IOJ	Md. Abdus Salam Chowdhury	2,074	1.6	N/A
CPB	Khandaker Lutfar Rahman	1,023	0.8	N/A
Zaker Party	Md. M. A. Awal	599	0.4	N/A
Bangladesh Muslim League (Jamir Ali)	A. N. M. Yusuf	379	0.3	N/A
BIF	Mohammad Saiful Islam	319	0.2	N/A
Jatiya Samajtantrik Dal-JSD	Gias Uddin Ahm	253	0.2	N/A
Majority		12,590	9.4	−4.0
Turnout		133,635	75.5	+14.2
AL gain from JP(E)				

General Election 1991: Moulvibazar-2
Party	Candidate	Votes	%	±%
JP(E)	Nawab Ali Abbas Khan	61,108	52.7	
AL	Sultan Md. Mansur Ahmed	45,526	39.3	
BNP	Md. Ataur Rahman	5,376	4.6	
Bangladesh Muslim League (Yusuf)	A. N. M. Yusuf	1,847	1.6	
Independent	Sham Narayan Gore	1,084	0.9	
Ganatantri Party	Md. Sirajuddin Ahmed	965	0.8	
Majority		15,582	13.4	
Turnout		115,906	61.3	
JP(E) hold				
