= Women's Bangladesh Premier League =

Professional women's Twenty20 cricket league in Bangladesh

- Countries: Bangladesh
- Administrator: Bangladesh Cricket Board
- Format: T20
- First edition: 2026
- Tournament format: Double round-robin format followed by playoffs

The Women's Bangladesh Premier League (Bengali: নারীদের বাংলাদেশ প্রিমিয়ার লিগ), abbreviated WBPL, is a professional women's Twenty20 (T20) cricket league in Bangladesh, organised by the Bangladesh Cricket Board (BCB). Founded in 2026, it features three city-based franchise teams.

It is scheduled to be held annually from 2026.
