= Tilagaon Union =

Tilagaon Union টিলাগাঁও ইউনিয়ন
- Union Council
- No. 09 Tilagaon Union Council
- Location in Bangladesh
- Country: Bangladesh
- Division: Sylhet Division
- District: Moulvibazar District
- Upazila: Kulaura Upazila

Government
  - Union Parishad Chairman: Abdul Malik

Population
  - Total: 31,868
- Demonym: Tilagaon
- Time zone: UTC+6 (BST)
- Postal code: 3231
- Website: tilagaonup.moulvibazar.gov.bd/bn

Tilagaon Union (Bengali: টিলাগাঁও ইউনিয়ন) is a Union Parishad under Kulaura Upazila of Moulvibazar District in the division of Sylhet, Bangladesh. It has an area of 18 square kilometres and a population of 31868.
