= Sultan Mohammad Mansur Ahmed =

Bangladeshi politician

Sultan Muhammed Mansur Ahmed
- সুলতান মোহাম্মদ মনসুর আহমেদ
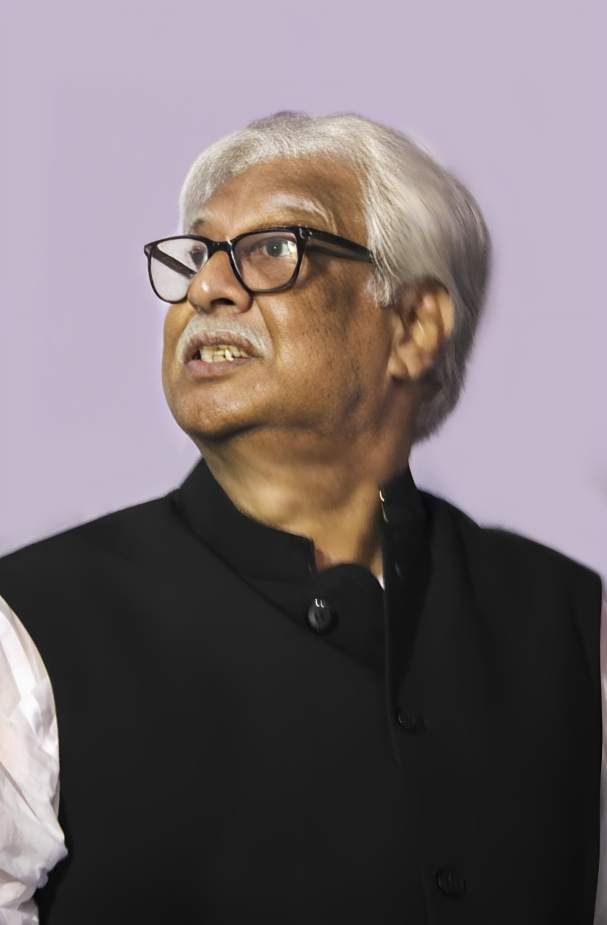

Member of Parliament
- In office 30 December 2018 – 7 January 2024
- Preceded by: Md. Abdul Matin
- Succeeded by: Shafiul Alam Chowdhury Nadel
- Constituency: Moulvibazar-2

Vice President Dhaka University Central Students' Union
- In office 1989–1990
- Preceded by: Aktaruzzaman
- Succeeded by: Amanullah Aman

Ex Organising Secretary Bangladesh Awami League

President of Bangladesh Chhatra League
- Leader: Sheikh Hasina
- Preceded by: Abdul Mannan (politician, born 1953)
- Succeeded by: Habibur Rahman

Personal details
- Born: 1 January 1956 (age 70) Kulaura, South Sylhet, British India
- Party: Gano Forum (former) Awami League (former)
- Other political affiliations: Jatiya Oikya Front
- Education: Murari Chand College, Dhaka University

Sultan Muhammed Mansur Ahmed is a Bangladeshi politician. He was vice president of Dhaka University Central Students' Union. In 2018 Bangladesh general election he contested from Moulvibazar-2 as a candidate of Jatiya Oikya Front and won the seat.

== Early life ==
He studied in Murari Chand College. He then graduated from Dhaka University.

== Career ==
Ahmed was the president of the Bangladesh Chhatra League, the student wing of the Awami League, from 1985 to 1988. Then he became the vice president of Dhaka University Central Students' Union. After being elected as a Member of Parliament in 1996 he was chosen as the Organising Secretary of Awami League.

In 2001, Ahmed was nominated by the Awami League to contest the parliamentary elections from Moulvibazar-2 but lost to MM Shahin.

Ahmed distanced himself from the Awami League and was elected in 2018 to parliament as a candidate of the Jatiya Oikya Front using the Sheaf of Paddy symbol of the Bangladesh Nationalist Party. He was the Member of Parliament from Moulvibazar-2 constituency from 2018 till 2024.

Ahmed was arrested on 30 September 2024 by Detective Branch.
