= Abdul Jabbar (Moulvibazar politician) =

Bangladeshi politician

- আবদুল জব্বার

Member of the Bangladesh Parliament for Sylhet-13
- In office 18 February 1979 – 12 February 1982
- Preceded by: Abdul Muntaquim Chaudhury
- Succeeded by: Position abolished

Personal details
- Born: 1945 Moulvibazar, Sylhet district, Assam Province, British India
- Died: 28 August 1992 (aged 46–47)
- Party: Awami League

Abdul Jabbar (1945 – 28 August 1992) was an Awami League politician, activist, and a Jatiya Sangsad member representing the now-defunct Sylhet-13 constituency. He was awarded a posthumous Ekushey Padak in 2020 for his contributions to the Bengali language movement and Bangladesh Liberation War. He was the founding general secretary of the Awami League's Kulaura branch in 1964.

== Early life and family ==
Jabbar was born in Kulaura, Moulvibazar, Sylhet district of British India's Assam Province. He had two sons: Abu Zafar Raju, a protocol officer for the prime minister of Bangladesh, and Asm Kamrul Islam, former chairman of Kulaura Upazila and general secretary of the Awami League's Kulaura branch.

== Career ==
Jabbar took part in numerous movements at the time, such as the 1962 Education Movement, the 1966 Six point movement and the 1969 Mass uprising. He also contested in the 1970 Pakistani provincial elections. Abdul Jabbar played an organising role during the Bangladesh Liberation War of 1971.

Jabbar was elected to parliament from Sylhet-13 as an Awami League candidate in 1979. He was a founding member of the Bangabandhu Parishad and the Muktijoddha Sanghati Parishad. He was also a member of the Red Crescent Society and the Nirmul Committee.

Jabbar was president of the Bangladesh Krishak League. He was detained for protesting against the assassination of Sheikh Mujibur Rahman and was tortured by Major S.H.M.B Noor Chowdhury. He was released from prison after 11 months, with the support of Brigadier General Amin Ahmed Chowdhury.

== Death ==
Jabbar died on 28 August 1992 from a heart attack. In 2020, he received a posthumous Ekushey Padak award.
