= Nafis Ahmad =

Bangladeshi geographer and educationalist (1911-1982)

- Born: 1911; United Provinces of Agra and Oudh, British India
- Died: 31 May 1982 (aged 70–71); Dhaka, Bangladesh
- Education: Aligarh Muslim University (BA, MA); London School of Economics (PhD)
- Occupations: Geographer, educationist

Nafis Ahmad (1911–1982) was a Bangladeshi geographer and educationist.

== Early life ==
Ahmad was born in 1911 in British India. He finished his undergraduate degree in 1934 and master's degree in 1935 from the Aligarh Muslim University. In 1953, he finished his PhD from the London School of Economics.

== Career ==
In 1936, Ahmad joined Aligarh Muslim University as a lecturer of geography. From 1940 to 1947, he served as the head of the Geography Department at the Islamia College, Calcutta. He published two books, Basis of Pakistan and Muslim Contribution to Geography, in 1947. In 1948, he was appointed the first head of the geography department of the Dhaka University. From 1964 to 1966, he was the dean of the Faculty of Science at Dhaka University. He was the founding president of Bangladesh Geographical Society in 1955, then known as East Pakistan Geographical Society. He is a fellow at the American Geographical Society and the Royal Geographical Society.

Ahmad published An Economic Geography of East Pakistan in 1958. The book was renamed to the Economic Geography of Bangladesh after the Independence of Bangladesh. It was expanded and republished in 1976. In 1961, the president of Pakistan awarded him the "Medal of Distinction". He retired from Dhaka University in 1971. He taught in a number of universities in Lahore and Karachi.

== Death ==
Ahmad died on 31 May 1982 in Dhaka, Bangladesh.

== Works ==
- The Basis of Pakistan (Calcutta, 1947).
- Muslim Contribution to Geography (Lahore, 1947).
- "Industrial Development in East Bengal (East Pakistan)." Economic Geography 26, no. 3 (1950): 183–95. https://doi.org/10.2307/141708.
- "The Indo-Pakistan Boundary Disputes Tribunal, 1949-1950." Geographical Review 43, no. 3 (1953): 329–37. https://doi.org/10.2307/211751.
- "The Pattern of Rural Settlement in East Pakistan." Geographical Review 46, no. 3 (1956): 388–98. https://doi.org/10.2307/211887.
- "Development of Industry in Chittagong." Ekistics 15, no. 90 (1963): 301–4. http://www.jstor.org/stable/43622743.
- An Economic Geography of East Pakistan (Karachi, 1968).
- Economic Resources of the Union of Burma (Massachusetts, 1971).
- A New Economic Geography of Bangladesh (Delhi, 1976)
