= Mujibur Rahman (commodore) =

Bangladeshi diplomat

- Died: 27 July 2021; Oakville, Ontario, Canada
- Military career
- Allegiance: Pakistan (before 1972); Bangladesh
- Branch: Pakistan Navy; Bangladesh Navy
- Service years: 1957 - 1987
- Rank: Commodore
- Commands: Chairman of Bangladesh Shipping Corporation; Director General of Department of Shipping; Commodore, COMKHUL
- Other work: President of Bangladesh Cricket Board

Mujibur Rahman was a Bangladesh Navy commodore, ambassador and former president of Bangladesh Cricket Board.

== Career ==
Rahman received training in British Navy and served as a submariner in the Pakistan Navy. He joined the Bangladesh Navy after the Independence of Bangladesh. He served as the director general of the Department of Shipping. He was the chairman of Bangladesh Shipping Corporation.

Rahman was a member of the Marylebone Cricket Club. In 1979, he was the manager of the Bangladesh national cricket team. He was the president of Bangladesh Cricket Board from 28 September 1981 to 30 January 1983. Rahman, who was the ambassador of Bangladesh to Libya, was appointed ambassador of Bangladesh to Brazil in 1986.

== Death ==
Rahman died on 27 July 2021 in West Oak Village Long-Term Care Home, Oakville, Ontario, Canada.
