= Bangladesh Geographical Society =

Research institute in Bangladesh

Bangladesh Geographical Society is a professional body for geographers in Bangladesh.

== History ==
Bangladesh Geographical Society was established in 1955 as the East Pakistan Geographical Society. In 1957, the society started publishing Oriental Geographer. The Oriental Geographer is published on January and July annually. It also started another journal in Bengali called Bhugol O Paribesh (Geography and Environment), published twice every year.

Bangladesh Geographical Society awards the Nafis Ahmad award, named after Nafis Ahmad, to geography students in universities in Bangladesh for outstanding academic achievements. The society is funded through grants from Dhaka University, Ministry of Science and Technology and other sources.
