= Nawab Ali Abbas Khan =

Bangladeshi politician

Nawab, MP Nawab Ali Abbas Khan এম পি
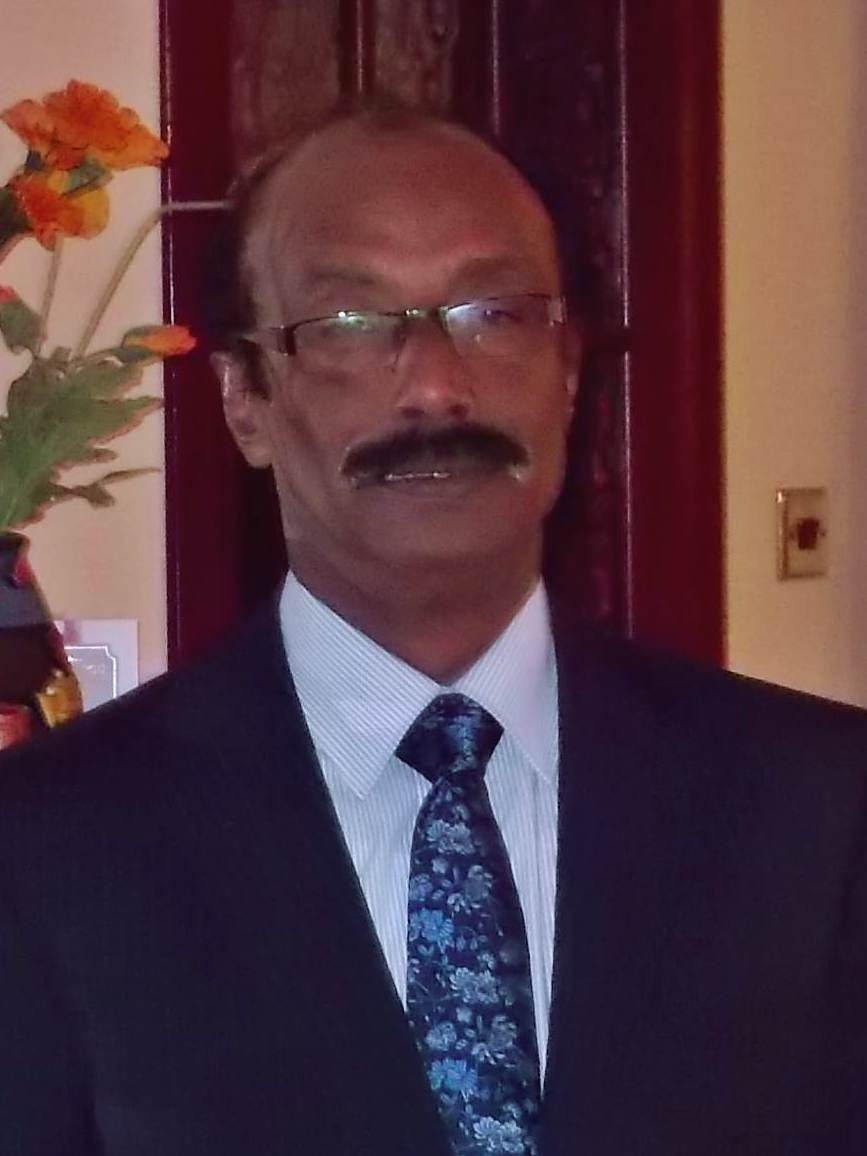
- Khan in 2015

Member of the Bangladesh Parliament for Moulvibazar-2
- In office 29 December 2008 – 4 January 2014
- Preceded by: MM Shahin
- Succeeded by: Abdul Matin
- In office 3 March 1988 – 11 June 1996
- Preceded by: A. N. M. Yusuf
- Succeeded by: MM Shahin

Personal details
- Born: 26 December 1958 (age 67)
- Party: Jatiya Party (Zafar)
- Relatives: Nawab Ali Haider Khan (grandfather) Nawab Ali sarwar khan (uncle) Nawab Ali Hasib Khan (son)
- Profession: Advocate, politician

Nawab Ali Abbas Khan (born 26 December 1958) is a Bangladeshi politician and former member of parliament. He is the current Secretary General of Jatiya Party (Zafar).

== Biography ==
Khan was born into the royal Prithimpassa family on 26 December 1958.

A member of the Jatiya Party (Zafar), he was elected as the member of parliament for Moulvibazar-2 (Kulaura Upazila) three times, in 1988, 1991, and 2008.

Khan's second son Nawabzada Ali Hasib Khan is involved with BNP Student Wing politics.
