= Abdul Matin (politician) =

Bangladeshi politician

Md. Abdul Matin

Member of Parliament (Moulvibazar-2)
- In office 5 January 2014 – 29 December 2018
- Preceded by: Nawab Ali Abbas Khan
- Succeeded by: Sultan Mohammad Mansur Ahmed

Personal details
- Born: 17 March 1945 (age 81) Moulvibazar District, Sylhet, Bangladesh
- Party: Independent

Md. Abdul Matin (Bengali: মোঃ আব্দুল মতিন) is an independent politician from Bangladesh and the Former Member of Parliament from Moulvibazar-2.

== Early life ==
Matin was born on 17 March 1945. In his political career he was an active member of Bangladesh Awami League, though he left the party twice for political reasons: once to be the upazila chairman where he joined Jatiya Party (Ershad) and later contested as an independent candidate in a parliamentary election leaving the Awami League and became an MP. However, after becoming Member of Parliament, he somehow retained his identity as member of Awami League.

== Career ==
Matin was elected to Parliament on 5 January 2014 from Moulvibazar-2 as an independent candidate. He was a member of Awami League and after becoming Member of parliament still managed to hold party position in Bangladesh Awami League.
