= Hazipur Union, Kulaura =

Union in Moulvibazar, Sylhet, Bangladesh

Hazipur Union হাজীপুর ইউনিয়ন
- Union
- No. 10 Hazipur Union Council
- Location within Bangladesh
- Country: Bangladesh
- Division: Sylhet
- District: Moulvibazar
- Upazila: Kulaura

Government
  - Union Parishad Chairman: Wadud Box

Population (2011)
  - Total: 29,255
- Time zone: UTC+6 (BST)
- Website: hazipurup.moulvibazar.gov.bd

Hazipur Union (also spelled as Hajipur Union; Bengali: হাজীপুর ইউনিয়ন) is a union parishad under Kulaura Upazila, Moulvibazar District, Sylhet Division, Bangladesh. The union has an area of 7196 acres and as of 2011 had a population of 29,255.

== Education ==
Literacy rate: 53.3%

=== Educational institutions ===
Colleges

- Nayabazar K. C. High School and College
- Paikpara M. A. Ahad Adhunik College

High schools

- Hazipur Girls High School
- Kanihati Ml High School

Primary schools

- Hazipur Government Primary School
- Pirerbazar Government Primary School
- Paikpara Government Primary School
- Mutaher Memorial Academy
- Alipur Government Primary School

== People's representatives ==
Current chairman: Wadud Box

List of chairmen
No.	Name	Term
01	Ali Raja Chowdhury	1971–1973
02	Satya Ranjan Deb	1974–1976
03	Hazi Habib Ullah	1977–1983
04	Abdul Quddus Chowdhury	1984–1997
05	Mabashwir Ali	1998–2011
06	Mahmud Ali	2011–2016
07	Abdul Basit Bachchu	2016–2021
08	Wadud Box	2021–present

== See also ==
- Upazilas of Bangladesh
- Districts of Bangladesh
- Divisions of Bangladesh
