= MM Shahin =

Bangladeshi politician and businessman

- এম এম শাহীন

Moulvibazar-2 Jatiya Sangsad
- In office 2nd
- In office 15 February 1996 – 12 June 1996
- Preceded by: Nawab Ali Abbas Khan
- Succeeded by: Sultan Md. Mansur Ahmed
- In office 2001–2008
- Preceded by: Sultan Md. Mansur Ahmed
- Succeeded by: Nawab Ali Abbas Khan

Personal details
- Party: Bangladesh Nationalist Party (1996-2018); Bikalpa Dhara Bangladesh (2018-current)

MM Shahin is a Bangladeshi politician, businessman, journalist, and former parliamentarian. He was elected a member of parliament from the Moulvibazar-2 (Kulaura Upazila) seat in the general elections of February 1996 and 2001.

== Political life ==
Shahin was first elected to parliament in February 1996 election as a candidate of the Bangladesh Nationalist Party (BNP). In the subsequent election held in June 1996, he ran as an independent candidate after being denied the party nomination but was defeated by Sultan Mohammad Mansur Ahmed of the Awami League. In 2001, he was again elected as an independent candidate. Following the 2006–2008 political crisis, his relationship with the party weakened. He contested the 2008 election again as an independent candidate but lost to the Jatiya Party candidate Nawab Ali Abbas Khan. On 15 November 2018, he left the BNP and joined Bikalpa Dhara Bangladesh, later contesting as a Grand Alliance candidate with the Boat symbol. However, in that election, Sultan Mohammad Mansur Ahmed, representing the Gano Forum under the Jatiya Oikya Front alliance, won the seat.

== See also ==
- List of members of the 8th Jatiya Sangsad
