= Dhaka Premier Division Women's Cricket League =

Top-tier women's List A club cricket league in Bangladesh

- Countries: Bangladesh
- Administrator: Bangladesh Cricket Board
- Format: List A
- First edition: 2018–19
- Latest edition: 2024–25
- Next edition: 2025–26
- Tournament format: Round-robin
- Number of teams: 10 (2023–24); 9 (2024–25)
- Current champion: Sheltech Cricket Academy (2024–25)
- Most successful: Mohammedan Sporting Club Women (2 titles)
- Relegation to: Dhaka First Division Women's Cricket League
- Website: tigercricket.com.bd

The Dhaka Premier Division Women's Cricket League, also known as the Women's Dhaka Premier League or WDPL, is a women's List A club cricket tournament in Bangladesh.

== Teams ==
- Abahani Limited Women's Cricket Team
- Bangladesh Ansar & VDP Women's Cricket Team
- Bangladesh Krira Shikkha Protishthan Women's Cricket Team
- City Club Women's Cricket Team
- Gulshan Youth Club Women's Cricket Team
- Jabid Ahsan Sohel Cricket Club Women's Cricket Team
- Kalabagan Krira Chakra Women's Cricket Team
- Khalaghar Shamaj Kalyan Shamity Women's Cricket Team
- Mohammedan Sporting Club Ltd Women's Cricket Team
- Rupali Bank Krira Parishad Women's Cricket Team
