= Gulshan Club =

Social club in Dhaka, Bangladesh

- Logo Gulshan Club

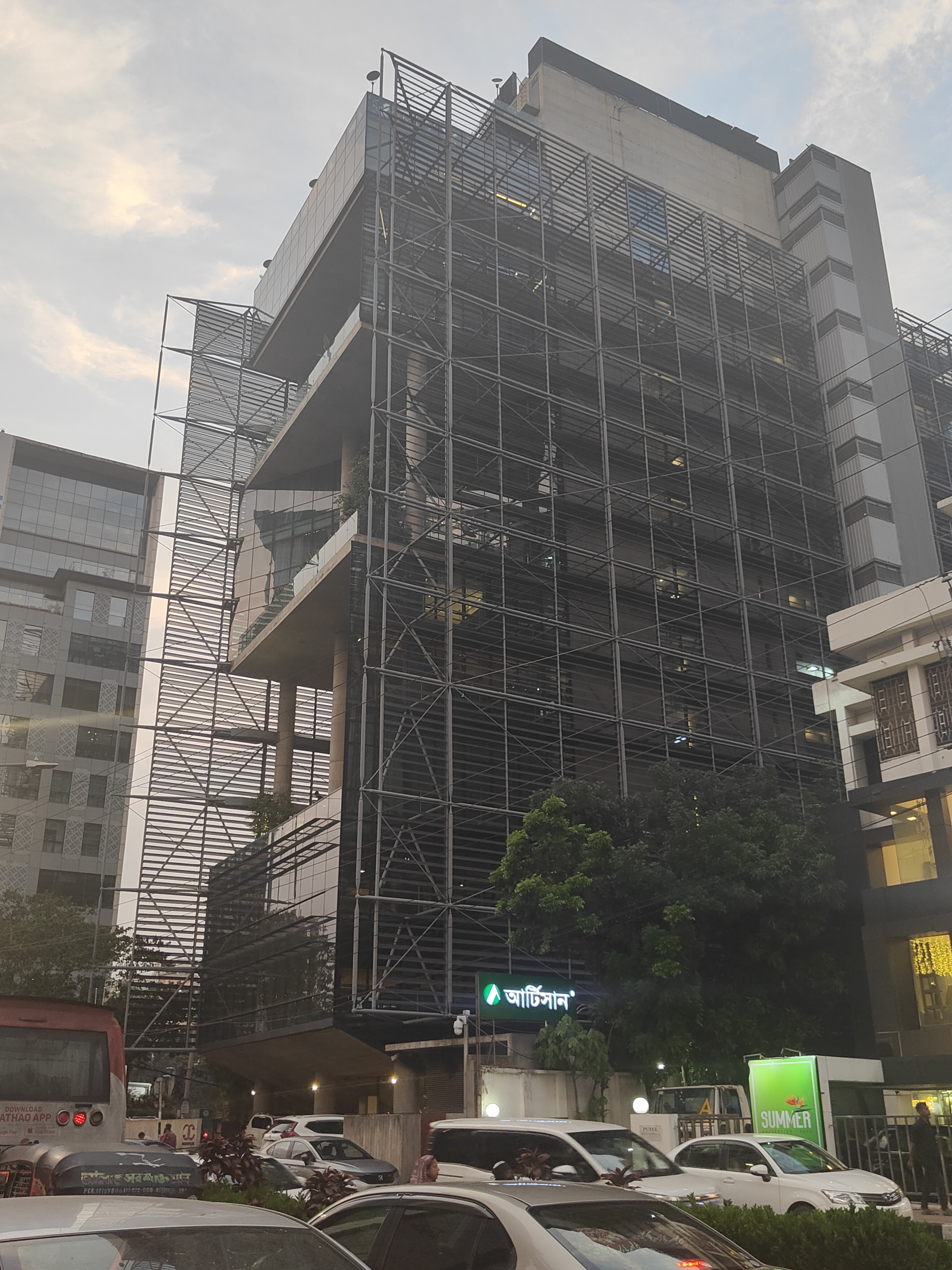
- Headquarters
- Headquarters: Dhaka, Bangladesh
- Location: House- NWJ-2/A, Bir Uttom Sultan Mahmud Road (Old Road 50), Gulshan-2, 1212
- Region served: Gulshan, Dhaka
- Official language: Bengali and English
- President: M.A Quader (Anu)
- Website: www.gulshanclub.com

Gulshan Club is a social club for residents of Gulshan located in the Capital Dhaka. The club has been described as "exclusive". Rafiqul Alam Helal has been the President of the club for the year 2021–2023. currently Anowar Rashid is the President of the club.

== History ==
Gulshan Club was founded in December 1978. it was registered under the Joint Stock Companies Act of 1913. It is officially called Gulshan Club Limited. Membership to the club is restricted to the permanent residents of Baridhara, Banani, and Gulshan. A 12-member executive committee which is headed by the president of the club. The members of the executive are elected annually. The club has a gym and swimming pool. The Clubs holds New Year eve's celebration.

On 29 December 2007 Engineer M. Faizul Islam was elected President of Gulshan Club.

Rafiqul Alam Helal served as President of Gulshan club from 2022 to 2023.
