= Md Shawkatul Islam =

Bangladesh Nationalist Party politician

Md Shawkatul Islam Shaku

Members of Parliament
- Incumbent
- Assumed office 17 February 2026
- Preceded by: Shafiul Alam Chowdhury Nadel
- Constituency: Moulvibazar-2

Personal details
- Party: Bangladesh Nationalist Party
- Occupation: Politician,

Shawkatul Islam Shaku is a Bangladeshi politician with the Bangladesh Nationalist Party. He was elected as the Member of Parliament for the Moulvibazar-2 constituency in the 2026 Bangladeshi general election held on 12 February 2026.
