= Shafiul Alam Chowdhury Nadel =

Bangladeshi politician

- শফিউল আলম চৌধুরী নাদেল
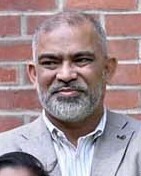
- Nadel in 2024

Member of the Bangladesh Parliament for Moulvibazar-2
- In office 10 January 2024 – 6 August 2024
- Preceded by: Sultan Mohammad Mansur Ahmed
- Succeeded by: Md Shawkatul Islam

Personal details
- Born: 11 February 1969 (age 57) Moulvibazar, Sylhet Division, Bangladesh
- Party: Bangladesh Awami League
- Spouse: Amatul Aziz Fahima Chowdhury
- Children: 3
- Education: Murari Chand College
- Occupation: Politician, sports organizer
- Website: www.sac-nadel.net

Shafiul Alam Chowdhury Nadel (born 11 February 1969) is a Bangladeshi politician. He is a former Jatiya Sangsad member representing the Moulvibazar-2 constituency served in 2024. He is an organizing secretary of the Bangladesh Awami League. He is also a director of Bangladesh Cricket Board.

== Early life ==
Nadel was born on 11 February 1969 in a Bengali Muslim family of Kulaura in Moulvibazar, Bangladesh. His paternal residence is the Koula Chowdhury Bari which is a branch of the Zamindars of Kanihati. Whereas, his maternal residence is the Bishkuti Saheb Bari where his maternal grandfather was popularly known as "Bishkuti Saheb". Nadel is the eldest son of Shamsul Alam Chowdhury and Mashuda Akhter Chowdhury. Through his paternal grandmother Nadel is a distant cousin of Nawab Ali Abbas Khan former MP of Moulvibazar-2.

== Career ==
Nadel is a Bangladesh Awami League politician. He started his political career in the Awami League by becoming the president of the Sylhet City School (now Sylhet Government Pilot High School) Chhatra League in 1986. Currently he is the organizing secretary of the Awami League Central Parishad. He became the nominated candidate of the Awami League from Moulvibazar-2 constituency in the 12th national parliament election. He won the election on 7 January 2024. He is a director of the Bangladesh Cricket Board. He is also the chairman of the Bangladesh women's national cricket team. He became the member of the Standing Committee on Ministry of Civil Aviation and Tourism on 4 February 2024.

After the fall of the Sheikh Hasina led Awami League government, Nadel's home in Sylhet was vandalized in April 2025 by activists of Bangladesh Jatiotabadi Chatradal, the student wing of the Bangladesh Nationalist Party, along with the homes of other Awami League leaders.

== Personal life ==
In 2000, Nadel married Amatul Aziz Fahima Chowdhury. He has two daughters, Maisha and Maria, and a son, Maaj Alam.
