= Sharmin Sultana (cricketer) =

Bangladeshi cricketer (born 1993)

Personal information
- Full name: Sharmin Sultana
- Born: 1 December 1993 (age 32); Bogra, Bangladesh
- Batting: Right-handed
- Role: Batter

International information
- National side: Bangladesh (2017–2019)
- ODI debut (cap 25): 16 January 2017 v South Africa
- Last ODI: 4 November 2019 v Pakistan

Domestic team information
- Years: Team
- 2009/10–2012/13: Sylhet Division
- 2017–2017/18: Rajshahi Division

Career statistics
Competition	WODI
Matches	13
Runs scored	115
Batting average	8.84
100s/50s	0/0
Top score	27
Catches/stumpings	3/–
- Source: Cricinfo, 7 April 2022

Sharmin Sultana (Bengali: শারমিন সুলতানা; born 1 December 1993) is a Bangladeshi cricketer who plays as a right-handed batter. She made her Women's One Day International (WODI) debut against South Africa on 16 January 2017.

In June 2018, she was part of Bangladesh's squad that won the 2018 Women's Twenty20 Asia Cup tournament, their first ever Women's Asia Cup title. Later the same month, she was named in Bangladesh's squad for the 2018 ICC Women's World Twenty20 Qualifier tournament.
