= Dhaka National Medical College =

Private medical college located in Dhaka, Bangladesh

- DNMC
- Type: Private medical college
- Established: 1994
- Academic affiliations: University of Dhaka
- Principal: Dr.Md Shamsur Rahman
- Academic staff: 315
- Students: 850
- Location: 53/1, Johnson Road, Sutrapur Thana, Dhaka, Bangladesh; 23.7107°N 90.4122°E
- Campus: Metropolitan
- Language: English, Bangla
- Website: dnmc.edu.bd

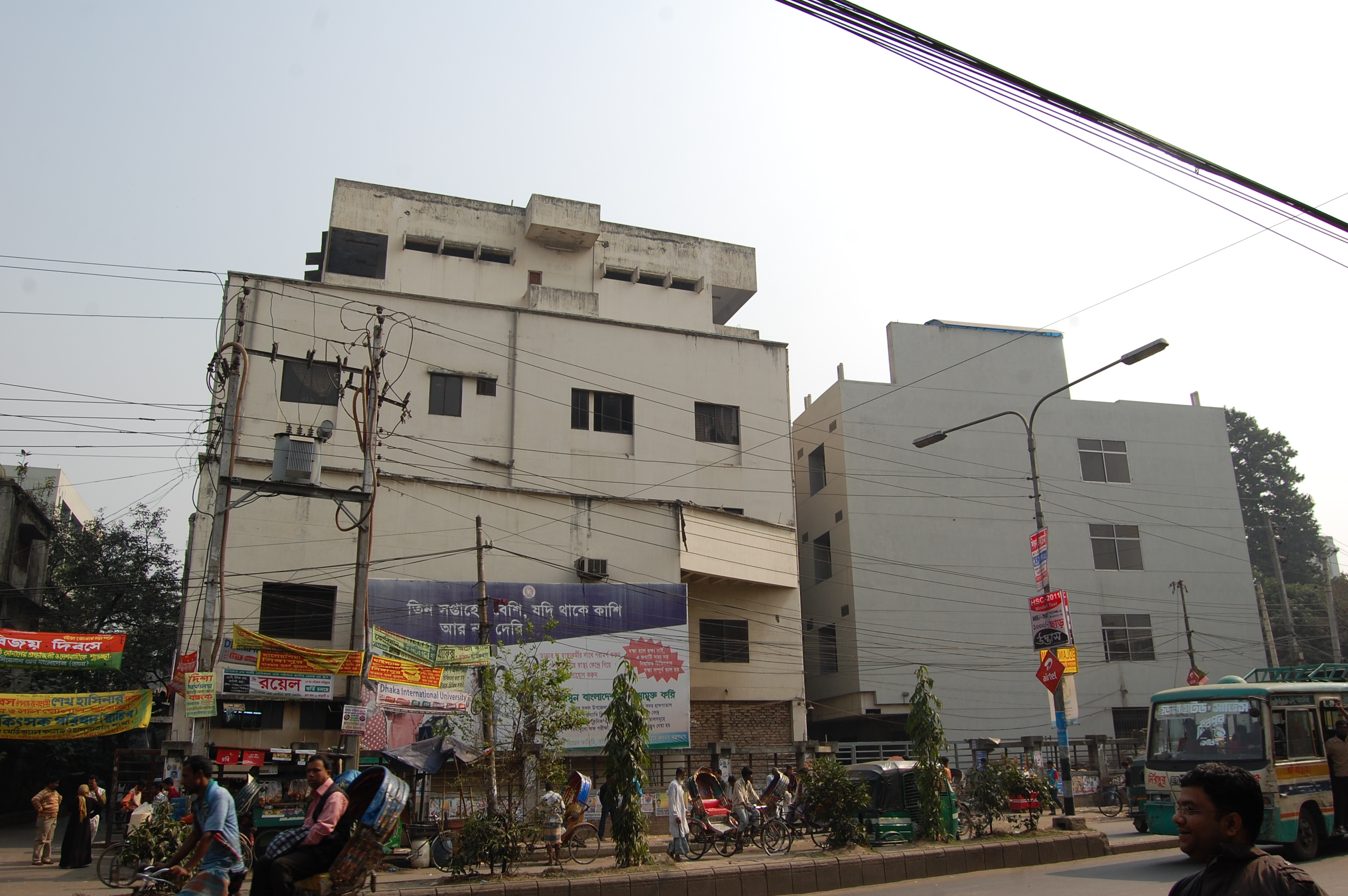
In front of DNMC

Dhaka National Medical College is a private medical college in Dhaka, Bangladesh. It was founded in 1925 as the Dhaka National Medical Institute which was then situated near Bahadur Shah Park.

Following the independence of Bangladesh in 1971, the educational function of the Dhaka National Medical Institute became moribund, although the associated hospital remained active. A medical college capability was restored with the creation of the Dhaka National Medical College. It was inaugurated on 15 October 1994 and opened to its first students. It has a 850-bed multidisciplinary hospital complex adjacent to the academic building. The college offers a five-year course of study, approved by the Bangladesh Medical and Dental Council (BMDC), leading to a Bachelor of Medicine & Bachelor of Surgery (MBBS) and Bachelor of Dental Surgery (BDS) degree from Dhaka University. After passing the final professional examination, there is a compulsory one-year internship. Dhaka national medical college offers MBBS course to students from India as well.
