= Sabikun Nahar =

Bangladeshi cricketer (born 1997)

Personal information
- Full name: Sabikun Nahar Jesmin
- Born: 1 January 1997 (age 29); Sherpur, Bangladesh
- Batting: Right-handed
- Bowling: Left-arm orthodox
- Role: Bowler

International information
- National side: Bangladesh (2024–present)
- T20I debut (cap 44): 22 July 2024 v Thailand
- Last T20I: 24 July 2024 v Malaysia

Domestic team information
- Years: Team
- 2012/13: Dhaka Division
- 2017/18: Mymensingh Division
- 2022: Rangpur Division

Career statistics
Competition	T20I	LA	T20
Matches	2	13	12
Runs scored	–	7	2
Batting average	–	2.33	0.66
100s/50s	–	0/0	0/0
Top score	–	5	2
Balls bowled	48	494	228
Wickets	3	19	7
Bowling average	15.00	10.47	22.57
5 wickets in innings	0	1	0
10 wickets in match	0	0	0
Best bowling	2/28	5/9	2/28
Catches/stumpings	1/–	2/–	1/–
- Source: Cricket Archive, 22 July 2024

Sabikun Nahar Jesmin (born 1 January 1997) is a Bangladeshi cricketer who plays for the Bangladesh women's cricket team as a bowler.

== International career ==
In July 2024, she earned maiden call-up for national team for the 2024 Women's Twenty20 Asia Cup. She made her Twenty20 International (T20I) debut against Thailand on 22 July 2024.
