= Abdul Muntaquim Chaudhury =

Bangladeshi politician (1929–2026)

- আব্দুল মুন্তাকীম চৌধুরী

Ambassador of Bangladesh to Japan
- In office 19 June 1973 – 27 August 1976
- Preceded by: Manoranjan Dhar
- Succeeded by: Mostafa Kamal

Member of the Bangladesh Parliament for Sylhet-13
- In office 7 March 1973 – 6 November 1976
- Preceded by: Position created
- Succeeded by: Abdul Jabbar

Member of the East Pakistan Legislative Assembly
- In office 7 December 1970 – 5 March 1971

Member of the National Assembly of Pakistan
- In office 1962–1965
- President: Ayub Khan
- Succeeded by: Mohammad Keramat Ali
- Constituency: Sylhet-III

Personal details
- Born: 2 September 1929 Hailakandi, Assam Province, British India
- Died: 9 October 2026 (aged 97) Melbourne, Victoria, Australia
- Party: Awami League
- Children: 2
- Parent: Tajammul Ali Chaudhury (father)
- Education: Aligarh Muslim University, St Xavier's College - University of Calcutta, Lincoln's Inn

Abdul Muntaquim Chaudhury (2 September 1929 – 9 October 2026) was a Bangladeshi Bengali politician, barrister and diplomat. He was a member of the 3rd National Assembly of Pakistan and the 1st Jatiya Sangsad. Chaudhury served as the ambassador to Japan during 1973–1976.

== Early life and background ==
Chaudhury was born in Hailakandi in the Sylhet district of the British Raj's Assam Province. He belonged to a Bengali Muslim family known as the Zamindars of Kanihati. His elder brother was Abdul Munim Chaudhury. His father, Khan Bahadur Tajammul Ali Chaudhury, was the deputy commissioner and hakim of Sylhet, and the author of the Tawārīkh-i-Halīmī (1894).

== Career ==
Chaudhury was a member of the 3rd National Assembly of Pakistan.

He supported numerous movements at the time, such as the Bengali language movement and the Six point movement. During the 1970 Pakistani provincial elections, he was elected as a member of the Pakistan National Assembly as an Awami League candidate.

Chaudhury played an organising role during the Bangladesh Liberation War of 1971. Following independence, he was a member of the drafting committee of the Constitution of Bangladesh and played an important role regarding Article 70. He had argued against keeping a provision in the Constitution of Bangladesh that allowed for the expulsion of parliamentary members from parliament if they get expelled from their party.

In the 1973 Bangladeshi elections, Chaudhury won the Sylhet-13 constituency, again as an Awami League candidate. His initial roles with the government of Bangladesh included serving as the ambassador to Japan, East Germany and South Korea, initiating activities that led to the textile industry in Bangladesh. Chaudhury's close relationship with Hayakawa made him regarded as the architect of Bangladesh–Japan relations. One of the outcomes of this fruitful relationship was the establishment of the JBIC-funded Pan Pacific Sonargaon hotel in Dhaka.

== Death ==
Chaudhury died in Melbourne, Australia on 9 October 2026, at the age of 97.
