= Khulna Divisional Stadium =

Stadium in Bangladesh

Coordinates: 22°50′40.11″N 89°32′14.47″E

- Khulna Cricket Stadium
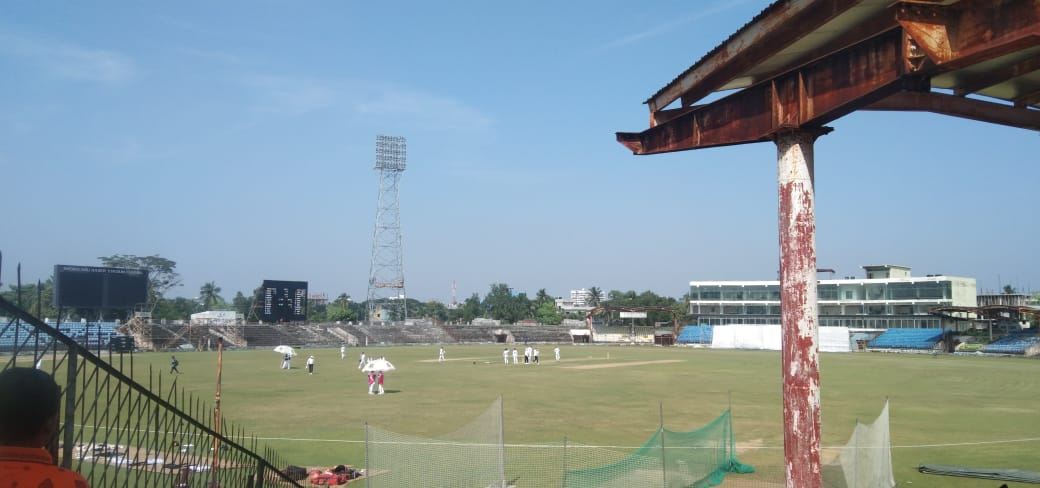
- Interactive map of Khulna Divisional Stadium

Ground information
- Location: Upper Jashore Road, Boikali, Khalispur, Khulna, Bangladesh
- Country: Bangladesh
- Establishment: 2004
- Capacity: 15,600
- Owner: National Sports Council
- Operator: Bangladesh Cricket Board
- Tenants: Bangladesh cricket team, Khulna Royal Bengals

International information
- First men's Test: 21–25 November 2012: Bangladesh v West Indies
- Last men's Test: 28 April–2 May 2015: Bangladesh v Pakistan
- First men's ODI: 20 March 2006: Bangladesh v Kenya
- Last men's ODI: 2 December 2012: Bangladesh v West Indies
- First men's T20I: 28 November 2006: Bangladesh v Zimbabwe
- Last men's T20I: 15 January 2016: Bangladesh v Zimbabwe
- Only women's ODI: 12 February 2009: Pakistan v Sri Lanka
- As of 15 January 2016; Source: www.espncricinfo.com/ci/content/ground/56691.html

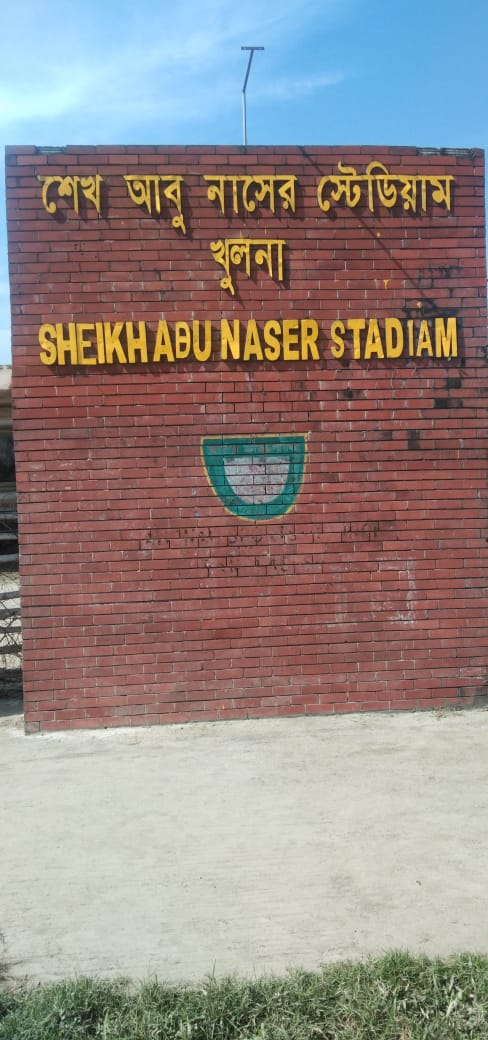
Main gate of Khulna Divisional Stadium

Khulna Divisional Stadium, (Bengali: খুলনা বিভাগীয় স্টেডিয়াম, previously known as Bir Shrestha Shahid Flight Lieutenant Motiur Rahman Stadium) is a test cricket venue in Khulna, Bangladesh.

== History ==
Khulna, situated in the south-western corner of the country, is the third-largest industrial centre in Bangladesh. The stadium holds 15,600 people and opened in 2004, as one of the five purpose-built cricket grounds established in the run-up to the 2004 Under-19 World Cup. It has a field dimension of 183 m X 137 m. It is the home stadium of the local Bangladesh Premier League franchise Khulna Titans. It was granted One Day International (ODI) status in January 2006. The stadium became the seventh Test venue in the country when it hosted the second Test between Bangladesh and West Indies in November 2012.

=== First Test, ODI, T20I ===
The ground hosted its first Test match in November 2012 when Bangladesh played against the West Indies, with the home team losing by 10 wickets. The first ODI, between Bangladesh and Kenya, had taken place on 20 March 2006. The stadium hosted its first Twenty20 International (T20I), between Bangladesh and Zimbabwe, on 28 November 2006, with the match being the first T20I to take place in Bangladesh.

== Stats and records ==
Up to 8 October 2018, the venue has hosted

- Test matches − 3
- ODI − 4
- T20I − 5
- In the debut Test at the venue, Abul Hasan made also his debut, and became only the second cricketer to make a century on debut as a number 10 batsman. He scored 100 off 113 balls.
- In the 2nd ODI at this venue, Sohag Gazi made his debut against the West Indies and recorded his best bowling figure 4-29, earning him Man of the Match award.
- In the 3rd ODI at this venue, also against the West Indies, Anamul Haque made his first ODI century, that earned him Man of the Match. In the match Bangladesh managed their largest ODI victory by runs (161).
- On 3 November 2014, during the 2nd Test at this venue, Shakib Al Hasan became only 3rd cricketer in the world to take 10 wicket or more and score a century in a same Test, after Ian Botham and Imran Khan. He achieved this feat against Zimbabwe. He scored 137 runs and took 10 wickets for 124 runs.
- In 3 Test matches hosted by this venue, Bangladesh got 3 different result. In the first Test (2012) they lost to the West Indies, in 2nd Test (2014) they defeated Zimbabwe, in 3rd Test (2015) they drew against Pakistan.
- In ODIs Bangladesh won all 4 matches at this ground, against Kenya, Zimbabwe (both 2006) and twice against the West Indies (2012).
- On 2 May 2015, Bangladesh drew their first ever Test match against Pakistan with Tamim Iqbal scoring his first double century, which was also the highest individual score by a Bangladeshi batsman.

== BPL 2013 ==
Khulna hosted matches of the Bangladesh Premier League for the first time, making it the third venue of the competition. 8 matches were played here from 22 to 25 January 2013. Home team Khulna Royal Bengals played 3 matches, of which they won the last two.
