= Bangladesh Cricket Board =

Governing body for cricket in Bangladesh

- বাংলাদেশ ক্রিকেট বোর্ড
- Sport: Cricket
- Jurisdiction: Bangladesh
- Abbreviation: BCB
- Founded: 1972; 54 years ago
- Affiliation: International Cricket Council
- Affiliation date: 1977; 49 years ago
- Regional affiliation: Asian Cricket Council
- Affiliation date: 19 September 1983; 43 years ago
- Headquarters: Sher-e-Bangla National Cricket Stadium, Dhaka, Bangladesh
- President: Tamim Iqbal Khan
- CEO: Nizam Uddin Chowdhury
- Operating income: ▲৳507.58 crore (US$41 million) (2022-23)
- Sponsor: Robi Axiata Limited
- Replaced: Bangladesh Cricket Control Board

Official website
- tigercricket.com.bd
- (Bangladesh)

The Bangladesh Cricket Board (Bengali: বাংলাদেশ ক্রিকেট বোর্ড, romanized: Bāṅlādēś Krikēṭ Bōrḍ; abbreviated as BCB), formerly known as the Bangladesh Cricket Control Board, is the governing body of cricket in Bangladesh. It became an associate member of the International Cricket Council (ICC) in 1977, and a full member on 26 June 2000. BCB has three teams that represent Bangladesh in international cricket: the Bangladesh men's national cricket team, the Bangladesh women's national cricket team and the Bangladesh under-19 cricket team.

The board's headquarters are located at the Sher-e-Bangla National Cricket Stadium in Mirpur, Dhaka.

== History ==
The Bangladesh Cricket Board was founded in 1972 as the Bangladesh Cricket Control Board. Its first constitution was drafted in 1976. The board changed its name, dropping "Control" from its title, in January 2007.

On 6 October 2005, the BCB launched its official website, www.tigercricket.com, at the Sonargaon Hotel.

Between 2007 and 2011, they invested ৳151.5 million (US$1.2 million) in developing the sport in the country. In 2006, the Board established an academy to encourage the development of young players. The Board issues central contracts and match fees to the national players.

=== Regional cricket associations ===
In the 2022 Annual General Meeting, BCB President Nazmul Hassan announced to have amended the board's constitution to make way for seven regional cricket associations for Barisal , Chittagong , Dhaka, Khulna, Rajshahi, Rangpur, and Sylhet. Larger regional bodies will have 11 members, while smaller bodies will consist of 7 members.

== Teams ==
- Bangladesh national cricket team
- Bangladesh women's national cricket team
- Bangladesh national under-23 cricket team
- Bangladesh national under-19 cricket team
- Bangladesh women's national under-19 cricket team
- Bangladesh A cricket team
- Bangladesh Tigers

== Finances ==
According to the BCB Activity Report 2017–20, the board has earned around US$29 million from team sponsors, media, and other rights for the mentioned period (2017–20), while they earned around US$33 million during the period of 2010–16. In the 2021 Annual General Meeting (AGM), BCB reported the revenue budget of ৳265.5 crore (US$22 million) and an expenditure budget of ৳260.6 crore (US$21 million) for the year of 2021–22.

According to its Summarized Financial Report 2022–23, BCB reported a total income of ৳507.58 crore (US$41 million) and an expenditure of ৳355.89 crore (US$29 million). The board recorded a surplus of approximately ৳151.69 crore (US$12 million) transferred to its accumulated fund. A significant gain on the revaluation of land, buildings, and other assets, amounting to approximately ৳3555.05 crore (US$290 million), contributed to the total sources of funds reaching approximately ৳4620.50 crore (US$380 million).

== Board members ==
Newly appointed BCB Ad Hoc Committee

Member	Description
Tamim Iqbal (President)	Former captain of the Bangladesh National Cricket Team across all formats and the country's highest run-scorer
Rashna Imam	Barrister and senior advocate at the Supreme Court
Sayeed Ibrahim Ahmed	Assistant professor of finance at AIUB
Mirza Yasir Abbas	Director at Dhaka Bank Limited and young entrepreneur
Israfil Khosru	Politician, columnist, entrepreneur, and member of the BNP chairperson's Foreign Affairs Committee
Fahim Sinha	Director of The Acme Group and sports organizer
Rafiqul Islam (Babu)	Veteran sports organizer, former joint secretary of the BCB, and representative of the Indira Road Krira Chakra
Tanjil Chowdhury	Chairman of Prime Bank, managing director of East Coast Group, and former elected director of the BCB
Mirza Salman Ispahani	Chairman of M. M. Ispahani Limited, a barrister-at-law and former member of the BCB
Athar Ali Khan	Former national cricketer, prominent international cricket commentator, and former national selector
Minhajul Abedin	Former captain of the Bangladesh National Cricket Team and former chief selector for the BCB

== Presidents ==
The following is a list of presidents of the BCB:

No.	Name (birth–death)	Portrait	Start of Term	End of Term	Length of Term	Ref.
1	Mohammad Yousuf Ali (1923 – 1998)		15 January 1972	14 August 1976	4 years, 212 days	
2	S. S. Huda (? – ?)		14 August 1976	28 September 1981	5 years, 45 days	
3	Mujibur Rahman (? - 2021)		28 September 1981	30 January 1983	1 year, 124 days	
4	K. Z. Islam (1935 – 2021)		30 January 1983	18 February 1987	4 years, 19 days	
5	Anisul Islam Mahmud (born 1947)		18 February 1987	27 December 1990	3 years, 312 days	
6	Kazi Bahauddin Ahmed (1926 – 1998)		27 December 1990	1 September 1991	248 days	
7	Abu Saleh Mohammad Mustafizur Rahman (1934 – 1996)		1 September 1991	4 July 1996	4 years, 307 days	
8	Saber Hossain Chowdhury (born 1961)		4 July 1996	19 August 2001	5 years, 46 days	
9	M. Akmal Hossain (? – ?)		19 August 2001	26 November 2001	99 days	
10	Mohammad Ali Asghar Lobby (born 1951)		26 November 2001	14 November 2006	4 years, 353 days	
11	Abdul Aziz (? – ?)		14 November 2006	29 July 2007	257 days	
12	Sina Ibn Jamali (? – ?)		29 July 2007	23 September 2009	2 years, 56 days	
13	A.H.M. Mustafa Kamal (born 1947)		23 September 2009	17 October 2012	3 years, 24 days	
14	Nazmul Hassan Papon (born 1961)		17 October 2012	21 August 2024	11 years, 309 days	
15	Faruque Ahmed (born 1966)		21 August 2024	29 May 2025	281 days	
16	Aminul Islam Bulbul (born 1968)		30 May 2025	7 April 2026	312 days	
17	Tamim Iqbal (born 1989)		7 April 2026	Incumbent	182 days	

== Team selectors ==
Habibul Bashar, chief selector of the Bangladesh national team, along with selectors Naeem Islam, Hasibul Hossain, and Nadif Chowdhury.

== Domestic competitions ==
BCB or its subsidiaries organise the following domestic cricket tournaments.

=== Regular competitions ===
==== Men's ====
- Bangladesh Cricket League – It is Bangladesh's second domestic first class cricket competition. It was first held in 2012-13 and is contested among four zones : East Zone, Central Zone, North Zone, and South Zone.
- Bangladesh Premier League – Bangladesh's premier franchise-based Twenty20 cricket league, since 2012
- Dhaka Premier Division Cricket League – also known as the Dhaka Premier League, is a List A cricket league, first held in 2013-14 and participated in by various cricket clubs of Dhaka
- Dhaka First Division Cricket League – second-tier 50-overs cricket league after DPL
- Dhaka Second Division Cricket League – third-tier 50-overs cricket league after DPL
- Dhaka Third Division Cricket League – fourth-tier 50-overs cricket league after DPL
- Bangladesh Cricket League 1-Day – is a List-A cricket version of the Bangladesh Cricket League tournament that began in Bangladesh in the 2021–22 season.
- National Cricket League – It is Bangladesh's oldest domestic first class cricket competition. It was first held in 1999–2000. Its 50-over version was first played in 2000-01 and last held in 2010–11, superseded by the Dhaka Premier Division Cricket League in 2013–14.

==== Women's ====
- Bangladesh Women's National Cricket League – It is a women's domestic cricket competition that took place in Bangladesh, with the first edition taking place in 2006–07. The competition is variously played using 50 or 20 over formats.
- Dhaka Premier Division Women's Cricket League – It is an annual List-A cricket tournament for Bangladeshi women's cricketers, that began in Bangladesh in the 2018–19 season.
- Women's BCL – It is an annual first-class cricket tournament for Bangladeshi women's cricketers, that began in Bangladesh in the 2022–23 season.
- Women's Bangladesh Premier League T20– The WBPL Bangladesh's first-ever franchise-based Twenty20 competition for women.

=== Occasional competitions ===
- Dhaka Premier Division Twenty20 Cricket League – It is Twenty20 version of the Dhaka Premier League cricket competition, but unlike its 50-over format, it consists only of local players in order to find out promising players from the domestic arena for T20 cricket. It was first played in 2018–19.
- 2013–14 Victory Day T20 Cup – a Twenty20 competition played only in 2013, featuring four different teams from the Dhaka Premier Division Cricket League
- 2020–21 BCB President's Cup – a 50-over competition played by current national team players and a few emerging players, being divided into three teams (i.e., Mahmudullah XI, Najmul XI, and Tamim XI)
- 2021-22 BCB Academy Cup – There are 2 tiers in the competition (Divisional & National). Divisional and Dhaka Metro champions and runner-ups will qualify for the national round. A total of 88 matches will be played.

== See also ==
- List of cricket grounds in Bangladesh
