= Khan (surname) =

Khan (/xɑːn/) is a surname of Turkic and Mongolic origin. First recorded as a hereditary title (khan or khagan) among nomadic tribes in the Central and Eastern Eurasian Steppe in antiquity, it denoted the royalty or military leaders of a historical khanate. However, it eventually declined in importance as a title and was adopted promiscuously as a surname, particularly among Muslims in South Asia during the Mughal Empire. Today, it remains a common surname in South Asia, Central Asia, parts of Iran, and parts of Russia.

The surname Khan is extremely common among Muslims in South Asia, including among those of Pashtun, Gujjar, Rajput and Mongolic descent. Khan as a last name is also used by the Maithil Brahmin, Bengali Hindus, and Kashmiri Hindus, native to the Kashmir Valley of the Indian union territory of Jammu and Kashmir. In the Caribbean, the surname is largely carried by Muslims of Indo-Caribbean descent.

As of 2014, Khan is one of the most common surnames worldwide, shared by over 22 million people in Asia and 23 million people worldwide. It is the surname of over 108,674 British Asians, making it the 12th-most common surname in the United Kingdom.

== Notable people ==
- Bahlul Khan Lodi (1401–1489) was the chief of the Pashtun Lodi tribe. Founder of the Lodi dynasty from the Delhi Sultanate upon the abdication of the last claimant from the previous Sayyid rule. Bahlul became sultan of the dynasty on 19 April 1451 (855 AH).
- Khushal Khan Khattak (1613–1689; Pashto: خوشال خان خټک), also known as Khushal Baba (Pashto: خوشال بابا), was a Pashtun poet, chief, and warrior.
- Mirwais Khan Hotak, revolted against Safavid Iran and established the Hotak dynasty.
- Azad Khan Afghan rose to power between 1752 and 1757, and controlled part of the Azerbaijan region up to Urmia city, northwestern and northern Persia, and parts of southwestern Turkmenistan and eastern Kurdistan.
- Kalu Khan Yousafzai, Afghan warrior hero who annihilated the Mughal army at the Malandari Pass devastating the Emperor Akbar the Great
- Mohammad Khatirjama Khan, leader of the Pathan tribe, gained control over north Indian territory of today's Uttar Pradesh in the 20th century, formed his capital in the area known as Barwaliya.

=== Scholars, intellectuals and academics ===
- Ahmed Raza Khan (1856–1921), Sunni Islamic scholar of south Asia
- Dilwar Khan (1937–2013), Bengali poet
- Gul Khan Nasir (1914–1983), poet, historian and politician from Pakistan
- Geoffrey Khan (born 1958), professor of Semitic languages at the University of Cambridge
- Muhammad Mojlum Khan, non-fiction writer best known for The Muslim 100
- Muhammad Siddiq Khan (1910–1978), Bengali academic from Bangladesh, "father of the Library and Information Science discipline in Bangladesh"
- M. A. Muqtedar Khan, Indian American Islamic philosopher, Sufi and academic
- Rukhsana Khan, Pakistani-Canadian children's writer and storyteller
- Salman "Sal" Khan, Bengali-American educator, known for the online Khan Academy
- Sirajul Hossain Khan, editor of Pakistan Times and the Eastern News Agency
- Wahiduddin Khan, Islamic scholar and peace activist
- Wasiullah Khan, Pakistani-American educator and founder of East–West University in Chicago
- Yasmin Khan (b. 1977), associate professor of history, Kellogg College, Oxford

=== Politicians and rulers ===
- Abdul Majid Khan, former MP for Habiganj-2, Bangladesh
- Abdul Majid Khan Tarin (1877–1939), senior political figure of the North-West Frontier Province, British India
- Abu'l-Khayr Khan, founder of Turko-Mongol Shaybanid Dynasty of Uzbekistan
- Akram Khan (born 1970), Indian politician
- Ahmad Khan, British politician, former Conservative MP
- Ahmad Khan Bangash, Nawab of Farrukhabad who commanded an Afghan division in the Third Battle of Panipat
- Ali Haidar Khan VC, soldier who singlehandedly stormed multiple hidden German forts which allowed his unit to safely cross the Senio River
- Ali Haider Khan (1896–1963), Nawab of Longla, Minister of Power (Assam Province)
- Alivardi Khan (1671–1756), Nawab of Bengal, Bihar and Orissa
- Ali Amjad Khan (1871–1905), Nawab of Longla, Magistrate
- Amanullah Khan, Sovereign of Afghanistan 1919–1929
- Amir Khan (Pindari) (1768–1834), Pindari leader in the early 19th century, later the Nawab of Tonk
- Arif Mohammad Khan, Indian politician and current governor of Kerala
- Asaf Khan, Wazir (Prime Minister) of Emperor Jahangir and Shahjahan
- Asif Nawaz Khan Janjua (1937–1993), former Chief Of Army Staff of the Pakistan Army
- Ataur Rahman Khan (1907–1991), Bengali activist politician, later Chief Minister of East Pakistan
- Ayub Khan (field marshal), Pakistan Army's only Field Marshall and president of Pakistan
- Ayub Khan (Emir of Afghanistan), former emir of Afghanistan during the Second Anglo-Afghan War
- Bahlul Khan (died 1488), founder of the Lodi dynasty
- Bairam Khan (1501–1561), Mughal commander, mentor and guardian of Akbar the Great
- Bilge Kul Qadir Khan, first ruler of Kara-Khanid empire
- Bismillah Khan Mohammadi, politician in Afghanistan
- Bostan Khan Tarin, 19th-century Pashtun clan warrior
- Chaudhry Ali Akbar Khan (1911–1967), Pakistani Federal Minister for Home Affairs 1964–1966
- Dilal Khan (1585–1666), Muslim ruler of Sandwip
- Dost Mohammad Khan, Sovereign of the Kingdom of Cabool and Afghanistan during the 19th century
- Fatali Khan Khoyski, first Prime Minister of Azerbaijan Democratic Republic
- Fateh Naseeb Khan, Chief General of Alwar Armed Forces
- Feroz Khan Noon (1893–1970), former Prime Minister of Pakistan
- Franklin Khan, Trinidad and Tobago politician
- Fuad Khan (born 1955), Trinidad and Tobago politician
- Ganj Ali Khan, military officer and Governor in Safavid Iran
- Gaju Khan Yousafzai, Afghan ruler of the 16th century
- Genghis Khan (1162–1227), Mongol warlord of the 12th century
- German Khan, Russian oligarch
- Ghazala Khan, mother of American soldier Humayun Khan
- Raja Ghazanfar Ali Khan Khokhar, one of Pakistan's first Federal Ministers
- Ghulam Jilani Khan (1925–1999), Governor of Punjab 1980 to 1985
- Habibullah Khan Barakzai, Emir of Afghanistan from 1901 to 1919
- Habibullah Khan Khattak, British-Indian and Pakistan army general who served in the Burma campaign as well as founder of an industrialist empire
- Habibullah Khan Marwat, acting Prime Minister of Pakistan and High Court judge
- Habibullah Khan Tarin, Pakistan army officer
- Habibullah Khan Tarzi, Afghan diplomat to France
- Hafiz Khan, Fijian Businessman, former Senator, and President of the Muslim League
- Hassan Khan (politician) (1936–2024), Indian politician
- Haydar Khan, 2nd Wazir of Sylhet
- Hulagu Khan, ruler of Mongolian horde
- Humayun Khan (soldier), United States Army Captain, died in the Iraq War in 2004
- Iftikhar Khan (1909–1949), had been nominated to become the first local Commander in Chief of Pakistan
- Iftikhar Khan Janjua, Hero of the Rann of Kutch and fell in the Battle of Chamb
- Imran Khan, Former Prime Minister of Pakistan from 2018 to 2022
- Ismail Khan, former Afghan politician and warlord from Herat
- Khan Abdul Ghaffar Khan Badshah Khan (1890–1988), Pashtun leader and activist
- Khan Sahib Shahal Khan Khoso (1909–1956), Baloch leader, MLA West Pakistan Assembly from 1953 to 1956
- Khizr Khan, first ruler of Sayyid Dynasty, fourth period of the Delhi Sultanate
- Khizr Muazzam Khan, father of American soldier Humayun, known for a speech at the 2016 Democratic National Convention
- Khudadad Khan (1888–1971), Indian recipient of the Victoria Cross
- Kublai Khan, king of China and founder of Yuan Dynasty
- Kutb Khan, commandant of Mahim when it was under Gujarat Sultanate
- Krum Khan, ruler and founder of Bulgaria
- Leila Khan, Pakistani politician
- Liaquat Ali Khan (1895–1951), 1st Prime Minister of Pakistan
- Lina Khan, Chair of the United States Federal Trade Commission from 2021 to 2025
- Maryam Khan (born 1989), member of the Connecticut State House
- M.J. Khan, member of the Houston City Council
- Malik Umar Hayat Khan (1875–1944), elected member of the Council of State of India
- Munawar Khan Awan, soldier of INA and later Pakistani Army, known for Operation Gibraltar
- Mahboob Ali Khan, 6th Nizam of Hyderabad, popularly known as Teesmaar Khan
- Mir Osman Ali Khan (1886–1967), 7th Nizam of Kingdom of Hyderabad
- Mete Khan, ruler and warlord of the Xiongnu confederation in 2nd century BCE China.
- Sultan Fetih Mehmet Khan, Ottoman sultan notable for the capture of Constantinople
- Muhammad Hamidullah Khan (1938–2011), Bangladeshi military leader, politician and author
- General Muhammad Musa Khan Hazara, former Chief Of Army Staff of the Pakistan Army
- Muhammed Akbar Khan, the first Muslim to become a General in British Indian Army
- Mohammad Daoud Khan, former (1909–1978), former Prime Minister and President of Afghanistan
- Muhammad Khan Junejo (1932–1993), former Prime Minister of Pakistan
- Muhammad Zafarullah Khan (1893–1985), the first Foreign Minister of Pakistan
- Murshid Quli Khan (c. 1665–1727), founder of the Nawab rulers in Bengal
- Nauroz Khan (1874–1964), Balochi Independence movement leader
- Nahar Khan, The Ruler of Mewat
- Najib Khan Yousafzai, Afghan Rohilla warrior and House Chief of Rohilkhand
- Nawab Ali Abbas Khan, Jatiya Party politician and three-time MP for Maulvibazar-2, Bangladesh
- Nawab Ali Haider Khan, 9th Nawab of Longla, minister and leader of the Independent Muslim Party
- Nawab Qaim Khan, 14th-century Ameer of the Delhi Sultanate and chief of Qaimkhani clan
- Nawazish Alam Khan (Hindi: नवाज़िश आलम ख़ान), Indian Baloch politician and member of the Sixteenth Legislative Assembly of Uttar Pradesh
- Nela Khan, Trinidad and Tobago politician
- Nisar Ali Khan (born 1954), Pakistani politician, former cabinet minister and opposition leader in the National Assembly of Pakistan
- Prince Aly Khan (1911–1960), Pakistani United Nations diplomat
- Prince Sadruddhin Aga Khan (1933–2003), diplomat, UN High Commissioner for Refugees from 1965 to 1977
- Qasim Khan, founder of Qasim Khanate dynasty of Russia
- Qasim Khan politician and deputy speaker of Pakistan from 2018 to 2022
- Rabina Khan, councillor for Shadwell and former Housing Cabinet member in Tower Hamlets, London
- Raeesah Khan, former Member of Parliament in Singapore
- Raja Habib ur Rahman Khan (1913–1978), Indian freedom fighter with the Indian National Army
- Raja Muhammad Zulqarnain Khan, President of AJK
- Raja Muhammed Sarfraz Khan (1905–1968), member of the Pakistan Movement
- Raja Sakhi Daler Khan Mangral, Kashmiri freedom fighter with the Indian National Army
- Raja Saroop Khan, former Governor of Punjab
- Rana Sanaullah Khan, Interior Minister of Pakistan from 2022 to 2023
- Rana Khudadad Khan, President of Pakistan Muslim League (Punjab)
- Rana Afzal Khan (1949–2019), Finance Minister of Pakistan and PML-N Leader
- Rana Mohammad Hanif Khan (1922–2005), Finance Minister of Pakistan
- Rana Muhammad Iqbal Khan, Speaker of the Punjab Assembly from 2008
- Rana Nazeer Ahmed Khan (born 1949), Pakistani former Federal Minister
- Rana Phool Muhammad Khan, MPA from Bhai Pheru (Phool Nagar)
- Purnendu Khan, MP from Uluberia Constituency of Bengal
- Sadiq Khan, Mayor of London
- Saifullah Khan family is a prominent political family of modern-day Pakistan, also known as Khans of Mewat
- Raja Hasan Khan Mewati was a Muslim Rajput Ruler of the Khanzada Dynasty of Mewat.
- Sahabzada Yaqub Khan (1920–2016), Pakistani general and diplomat
- Sardar Farooq Khan Leghari (1940–2010), first Baloch president of Pakistan
- Sardar Muhammad Ibrahim Khan (1915–2003), founder of Azad Jammu Kashmir State
- Sardar Shaukat Hayat Khan (1915–1998), senior political figure and lieutenant of the Quaid-i-Azam in the Punjab
- Sardar Sikandar Hayat Khan (1934–2021), former Prime Minister and President of Azad Jammu and Kashmir
- Sardar Sir Sikandar Hayat Khan (1892–1942), KCSI, Premier of the Punjab
- Sikandar Khan Ghazi, commander during the Conquest of Gour and the 1st Wazir of Sylhet
- Shah Mahmud Khan, former Prime Minister of the Kingdom of Afghanistan
- Shah Nawaz Khan (general) (1914–1983), Major General of the Indian National Army, one of the three of the famed Red Fort Trio
- Shah Nawaz Khan Janjua (1914–1983), Indian freedom fighter with the Indian National Army
- Shah Nawaz Khan, revolutionary in India of the Janjua Rajput
- Shaista Khan, Mughal governor of Bengal from 1664 to 1688
- Shaybani Khan the Uzbek ruler of Samarkand and king who revived Shaybanid Dynasty
- Sulaiman Khan Karrani, Sultan of Bengal
- Sultan Suleiman Khan (Suleiman the Magnificent) (1494–1566), Ottoman Turkish Sultan
- Tughral Tughan Khan, 13th-century Mamluk Governor
- Turram Khan, revolutionary fighter from Hyderabad whose name has become eponym of bravery in many Indian languages
- Tikka Khan (1915–2002), former Chief of Army Staff of the Pakistan Army
- Wazir Akbar Khan (1816–1847), prince and general in Afghanistan
- Yulbars Khan Uyghur General of Kuomintang, also known as "Tiger General" for his bravery, provincial Governor of Xinjiang province from 1951 to 1971
- Yusaf Khan (Muhammad Yusaf Khan) (born 1948), former Vice Chief Of Army Staff of the Pakistan Army
- Zafar Khan, former general in the Afghan National Army, Daku Muhammad Khan from chakwal belongs to dhurnal Awan tribe
- Saumitra Khan, Indian politician
- Indranil Khan, Indian politician

=== Actors and entertainers ===
- Aamir Khan, Indian actor, film producer and director
- Abdul Karim Khan, Indian classical vocalist
- Abdul Wahid Khan, Indian musician, mentor of many singers like Muhammad Rafi and Ram Narayan
- Adil Khan, Norwegian actor of Pashtun and Punjabi descent
- Adnan Sami Khan, Indian singer, playback singer and music composer
- Aiman Khan, Pakistani film and television actress, sister of actress Minal Khan
- Akram Khan (dancer), British dancer of Bangladeshi descent
- Anik Khan, Bangladesh-born American rapper
- Ali Akbar Khan, Bangladesh Bengali sarod player
- Alvira Khan Agnihotri, Indian film producer and fashion designer (Salman Khan's sister and Salim Khan's daughter)
- Amar Khan, Pakistani director, writer and television actress
- Amjad Khan, Indian actor and director
- Arbaaz Khan, Indian actor, director and film producer (Salman Khan's brother)
- Asad Amanat Ali Khan (1955–2007), Pakistani vocalist
- Ayesha Sultana Khan (Sharmila Tagore), actress, model, Central Board of Film Certification chairperson (mother of Saif Ali Khan)
- Ayub Khan, Indian television and film actor (Nasir Khan's son and Dilip Kumar's nephew)
- Attaullah Khan, Pakistani singer
- Azam Khan, Bangladeshi singer-songwriter
- Bat for Lashes, stage name of Natasha Khan, British singer-songwriter and musician
- Bilal Khan (disambiguation), several people
- Cassius Khan, Canadian Indian classical musician in New Westminster, known as the Ghazal/Tabla Wizard
- Chaka Khan, American R&B singer
- Conrad Khan, British actor
- Dilip Kumar (born Muhammad Yusuf Khan), Indian actor of Pashtun origin
- Faisal Khan, Indian actor (Aamir Khan's brother)
- Farah Khan, Indian film director, choreographer, dancer and fashion designer
- Faraaz Khan, Indian film actor of 1990s and early 2000s
- Fardeen Khan, Indian actor (son of Feroz Khan)
- Fawad Khan, Pakistani film actor and singer, also worked in Indian films
- Feroz Khan, Indian actor, director and film producer (father of Fardeen Khan)
- Feroze Khan, Pakistani television actor and producer
- Gauahar Khan, Indian model and actress
- Gul Khan, Indian television producer
- Guz Khan (born 1986), English comedian and actor
- Helen Richardson Khan, Indian actress (wife of Salim Khan)
- Hina Khan, Indian television actress
- Imran Khan (Bollywood actor) (born Imran Pal), Indian American actor, works in Bollywood (Aamir Khan's nephew)
- Imran Khan (singer), Dutch singer of Punjabi descent
- Irrfan Khan (1967–2020), Indian actor (in Indian films and Hollywood films)
- Jiah Khan, British-American actress who worked in Indian Bollywood films
- Junaid Khan, Pakistani film actor, singer and writer
- Kabir Khan, Indian director, screenwriter, cinematographer and film producer
- Kader Khan, Indian actor, screenwriter and film producer of Afghan origin.
- Kareena Kapoor Khan, Indian actress (wife of Saif Ali Khan, member of Kapoor family, daughter of actor Randhir Kapoor and actress Babita)
- Khalil Ullah Khan, film and TV actor, 1976 winner of Bangladesh National Film Award for Best Supporting Actor
- King Khan, real name Arish Khan, Indian/French-Canadian musician
- Krutika Desai Khan, Indian actress working in film, television and theatre
- Leila Khan, English actress
- Mahira Khan, Pakistani drama and film actress, also works in Bollywood
- Mansoor Khan, Indian director, film producer and screenwriter (Nasir Hussain's son, Aamir Khan's cousin)
- Marco Khan, Iranian actor
- Mehboob Khan, Indian director, film producer, actor and writer
- Minal Khan, Pakistani television actress, sister of actress Aiman Khan
- Nahnatchka Khan, American television writer and producer
- Nasir Hussain Khan, Indian director, film producer and screenwriter (Aamir Khan's uncle)
- Nasir Khan, Indian actor (Dilip Kumar's brother)
- Nazir Ahmed Khan, Indian director, film producer and actor in British India and then Pakistan (brother-in-law of filmmaker K. Asif)
- Nikhat Khan, Indian film producer (Aamir Khan's sister)
- Noor Khan, Pakistani television actress and sister of actress Sarah Khan
- Nusrat Fateh Ali Khan, Pakistani vocalist
- Parvati Khan, Indo-Trinidadian singer and model who worked in Bollywood
- Praga Khan, real name Maurice Engelen, Belgian techno musician
- Rahat Nusrat Fateh Ali Khan, vocalist
- Rehan Khan, Bollywood singer from Goa
- Riyaz Khan, South Indian actor
- Roy Sætre Khantatat, Norwegian singer, better known as Roy Khan
- Shafqat Amanat Ali Khan, Pakistani vocalist
- Saif Ali Khan, Indian actor (son of Sharmila Tagore, husband of Kareena Kapoor)
- Sajid Khan, Indian actor and singer
- Sajid Khan, Indian film director and actor
- Salim Khan, Indian screenwriter and scriptwriter (father of Salman Khan), part of screenwriting duo Salim–Javed
- Salman Khan, Indian actor and film producer
- Sana Khan, Indian model and television actress
- Sanjay Khan, Indian actor, director and film producer (father of Zayed Khan)
- Sarah Khan, Pakistani TV actress in Urdu television serials
- Saroj Khan, Indian choreographer
- Shahid Khan, British DJ, record producer, songwriter and musician known professionally as Naughty Boy
- Shahrukh Khan, Indian actor, film producer (known as King Khan)
- Sahil Khan, Indian actor
- Shakib Khan, Bangladeshi actor, producer, occasional singer, film organiser and media personality (known as King Khan)
- Shakira Khan (born 2002), English television personality
- Soha Ali Khan, Indian actress (Saif Ali Khan's sister, daughter of actress Sharmila Tagore)
- Sohail Khan, Indian actor, director and film producer (brother of Salman Khan)
- Sudhir, real name Shah Zaman Khan Afridi, actor
- Tahir Hussain Khan, Indian director and film producer (Aamir Khan's father)
- Tariq Khan, Indian actor (Aamir Khan's cousin, Nasir Hussain's nephew)
- Valentino Khan, American DJ, music producer, guitarist, singer, songwriter
- Zareen Khan, Bollywood actress who has also appeared in Tamil and Punjabi films
- Zayed Khan, Indian actor (Sanjay Khan's son, Sussanne Khan's brother, brother-in-law of Hrithik Roshan)
- Zayed Khan, Bangladeshi actor

=== Sportspeople ===
- Khan, former ring name of retired American professional wrestler Dave Bautista
- Akram Khan (cricketer), former captain of the Bangladeshi Cricket Team
- Amir Khan (British boxer), British boxer of Pakistani descent
- Awal Khan, Pakistani-born Omani cricketer
- Mohsin Khan, former Pakistani cricketer
- Moin Khan, former Pakistani cricketer
- Muhammad Essa Khan, former Pakistani footballer
- Athar Ali Khan, Bangladeshi former cricketer, selector and cricket commentator
- Carla Khan, Pakistani professional squash player
- Hajra Khan, Pakistani footballer
- Imad Khan, South African rugby union player
- Imran Khan, Former Prime Minister of Pakistan, politician and former cricketer and captain of the Pakistan cricket team
- Kaleemullah Khan, Pakistani footballer
- Jahangir Khan, former Pakistani professional squash player and World No. 1
- Jansher Khan, former Pakistani professional squash player and World No. 1
- Mir Sultan Khan, Pakistani chess champion
- Nafees Iqbal (Mohammad Nafees Iqbal Khan), Bangladeshi cricketer
- Nasim Khan, Pakistani cricketer
- Shahid Khan Afridi, Pakistani cricketer
- Salman Khan, Indian cricketer
- Shahrukh Khan, Indian cricketer
- Junaid Khan, Pakistani cricketer
- Usman Khan Shinwari, Pakistani cricketer
- Simon Khan, English golfer
- Tamim Iqbal (Tamim Iqbal Khan), Bangladeshi cricketer
- Younus Khan, Pakistani cricketer
- Sajid Khan, Pakistani cricketer
- Shadab Khan, Pakistani cricketer
- Sharjeel Khan, Pakistani cricketer
- Vitaly Khan, Kazakhstani freestyle swimmer
- Zaheer Khan, Indian cricketer
- Rocky Khan, All Blacks 7s rugby player
- Rashid Khan, Afghanistan international cricketer
- Zahir Khan, Afghanistan international cricketer

=== In science and technology ===
- Abdul Qadeer Khan, Pakistani metallurgist, considered the founder of Pakistan's gas-centrifuge programme
- Akhtar Hameed Khan Pakistani social scientist and development practitioner
- Fazlur Khan, Bengali-American structural engineer and designer of Chicago's Sears Tower and John Hancock Center
- Ishfaq Ahmad Khan, Pakistani scientist in particle and nuclear physics
- Munir Ahmad Khan, Pakistani nuclear engineer, credited as the father of Pakistan's Atomic Project
- Mohammad Islam Khan (1957–2010), Indian glycobiologist, scientist at the National Chemical Laboratory
- Naeem Ahmad Khan (1928–2013), Pakistani nuclear physicist and university professor of physics
- Shaukat Hameed Khan, Pakistani nuclear physicist
- Mohammad Ajmal Khan, physician in Delhi, India, one of the founders of the Jamia Millia Islamia University
- Muhammad Siddiq Khan (1910–1978), librarian of the Central Library of the University of Dhaka and the founder of the university's Department of Library Science
- Iqrar Ahmad Khan, Pakistani agricultural scientist, professor of horticulture at the University of Agriculture, Faisalabad in Pakistan
- Razib Khan, Bengali-American geneticist

=== Other professions ===
- Abul Kashem Khan (1905–1991), jurist, political leader, and industrialist from Bangladesh
- Alan Khan (born 1971), South African radio presenter
- Amjad Khan (1940–1992), Indian film producer
- Baseera Khan, American artist
- Chantal Khan Da Silva, Canadian journalist born to a Pakistani-Brazilian family; currently residing in the United Kingdom. An NBC News reporter and editor.
- Fazal Khan, Pakistani lawyer and Pashtun human rights activist
- Gauri Khan (born 1970), Indian interior designer and film producer (wife of Indian star Shahrukh Khan)
- Hakim Khan descendent of Shershah Suri and chief commander of Rana Pratap's army
- Inayat Khan, (1882–1927), founder of Universal Sufism and the Sufi Order International
- Irene Khan (born 1956), Bangladeshi lawyer, former Secretary General of Amnesty International
- Kiran Rao Khan (born 1973), Indian director, film producer and screenwriter (wife of Indian star Aamir Khan)
- The (unknown) 'M Khan', the subject of many gag routines on The Mary Whitehouse Experience because of long-standing graffiti visible from a major London road
- Mansoor Ali Khan (born 1979), Pakistani journalist and television anchor
- Mirza Abu Taleb Khan (1752–1805/6), Indian tax-collector and travel-writer
- Mohammad Sidique Khan (1974–2005), London train suicide bomber
- Nawab Muhammad Hayat Khan (1833–1901) British-Indian administrator and aristocrat
- Nick Khan Iranian American President of WWE, World Wrestling Entertainment
- Noor Inayat Khan (1914–1944), British spy in occupied France
- Oghuz Khan, legendary forefather of the Turkic people
- Peter Khan (born Afghan-Khan), Australian member of the Universal House of Justice of the Bahá'í Faith
- Shahid Khan, co-owner of the Jacksonville Jaguars of the National Football League (NFL) and Fulham F.C. of the EFL Championship, Founder, co-owner of the All Elite Wrestling (AEW) promotion.
- Shahal Khan, American Businessman and founder of Burkhan Family Office.nawab Malik Ameer Muhammad Khan he belongs to kalghan Awan tribe
- Sussanne Khan (born 1975), Indian interior fashion designer and entrepreneur
- Syed Ahmed Khan (1817–1898), Islamic scholar
- Tariq Ali Khan (born 1943), British-Pakistani writer, intellectual and socialist
- Tasmin Lucia Khan (born 1980), British Bangladeshi journalist and news presenter for BBC News
- Tony Khan (born 1982), American businessman; co-owner of the Jacksonville Jaguars and Fulham F.C. along with his father Shahid, and CEO, President of All Elite Wrestling and Ring of Honor Wrestling.
- Vilayat Inayat Khan (1916–2004), former head of the Sufi Order International
- Usman Khan (1991–2019), Islamic terrorist and perpetrator of the 2019 London Bridge stabbing
- Zia Inayat Khan, the Pir of the Sufi Order International

== Fictional characters ==
- Achmed Khan and Amir Khan, playable characters and brothers who love rock music in the Backyard Sports franchise
- Ahmed Khan / Codename: Pakistan, a superhero in the comic book series The Ambassadors and Big Game
- Haman Khan, a prominent Gundam villain in Mobile Suit Zeta Gundam and the principal antagonist in its sequel Mobile Suit Gundam ZZ; and her father Maharaja Khan
- Kamal Khan, the main villain in the James Bond film Octopussy
- Kamala Khan, the fourth character to assume the identity of the Marvel Comics superheroine Ms. Marvel
- Khan, Primus of House Aico, a game character from Paladins
- Khan, one of the villains in the Broken Sword: The Shadow of the Templars computer game
- Khan, a Chinese-American detective from the Khan! 1975 US television series
- Manga Khan, a DC Comics character
- Rizwan Khan, main character in the 2010 Bollywood film My Name Is Khan
- Dark Khan, the main antagonist of the crossover video game Mortal Kombat vs. DC Universe who is the merging between Shao Khan and DC Comics villain Darkseid
- Shadow Khan, the group of villains in the animated series Jackie Chan Adventures
- Shiwan Khan, a recurring enemy of The Shadow
- The Mandarin, archenemy of Iron Man, whose real name is Khan, also from Marvel Comics, including the film Shang Chi and the Legend of the Ten Rings.
- Khan Noonien Singh, an antagonist in the Star Trek franchise and the titular character of the 1982 film The Wrath of Khan
- Mr Khan, British Pakistani character on the British TV show Citizen Khan
- Shere Khan, a treacherous tiger who is the arch-enemy of the feral boy Mowgli in Rudyard Kipling's novels The Jungle Book (1894) and The Second Jungle Book. (1895) He made appearances in the 1942, 1967, 1994, 1997, 1998, 2003, 2016, and 2018 films. He has also appeared on the TV series such as the 1989, 1998, and 2010 versions; as well as the 1990s cartoon series TaleSpin and Jungle Cubs.
- Kobra Khan, a cobra-themed Snake-Man from the He-Man franchise such as the 1980 and 2002 TV series.
- Khan, a firm but fair chimpanzee leader in the 2017 video game Planet of the Apes: Last Frontier.
- Khan, a significant recurring character in the Metro video game series (Metro 2033, Last Light, Exodus)
- Yasmin "Yaz" Khan, a companion of the Thirteenth Doctor on the science fiction series Doctor Who.
- Minhkhoa "Khoa" Khan, also known as Ghost-Maker is a character that appears in DC Comics. He is a vigilante and was an old friend of Bruce Wayne.

== See also ==
- Khan (title)
- Farrakhan
- Khagan
- Gurkhan
