= Nawab Ali Asghar Khan =

Indian legislator (1898–1984)

- আলী আসগর খাঁন

Member of Indian Legislative Assembly
- In office 1945–1947
- President: G. V. Mavalankar
- Preceded by: Abdur Rasheed Choudhury
- Succeeded by: Assembly disbanded
- Constituency: Assam (Muslim)

Member of Assam Legislative Council
- In office 1937–1946

Personal details
- Born: 12 January 1898
- Died: May 1984 (aged 86)
- Children: Ali Yeawar Khan
- Parent: Ali Amjad Khan (father)
- Relatives: Ali Haider Khan (brother)

Nawab Ali Asghar Khan (12 January 1898 – May 1984) was a member of the Prithimpassa family and a member of the Assam Legislative Council from 1937 to 1946 and the Central Legislative Assembly.

== Early life and family ==
Khan was born on 28 Poush 1304 BS (12 January 1898 CE) to a noble Bengali Shi’ite family known as the Nawabs of Longla based in the village of Prithimpassa in South Sylhet (then under the North-East Frontier province of the British Raj). His father, Nawab Ali Amjad Khan, was an honorary magistrate by occupation. His mother was Syeda Fatima Banu, daughter of Syed Aminuddin Hasan of Narapati West Haveli, Chunarughat, Habiganj.

Khan married in 1924 to Safia Banu Ara Begum, daughter of Nawab Wasif Ali Mirza of Murshidabad.

== Career ==
Khan represented Assam in the Central Legislative Assembly. He was also a member of the Assam Legislative Council from 1937 to 1946 as an All-India Muslim League politician.

== Death ==
Khan died in May 1984. He had a son named Ali Yeawar Khan, who was a member of the Pakistan parliamentary assembly and the first chairman of Prithimpassa Union.
