= Farakhi =

Farakhi, Farrakhi, Farokhi, Farrokhi, Farrukhi, Farukhi or Farkhi (Persian: فرخي) may refer to:

- Farrokhi, Isfahan, a city in Iran
- Farakhi, South Khorasan, a village in Iran
- Hoseyn Farakhi, a village in Iran

== See also ==
- Farrukhi (name)
