= Naturalization ceremony =

Event where US immigrants become citizens

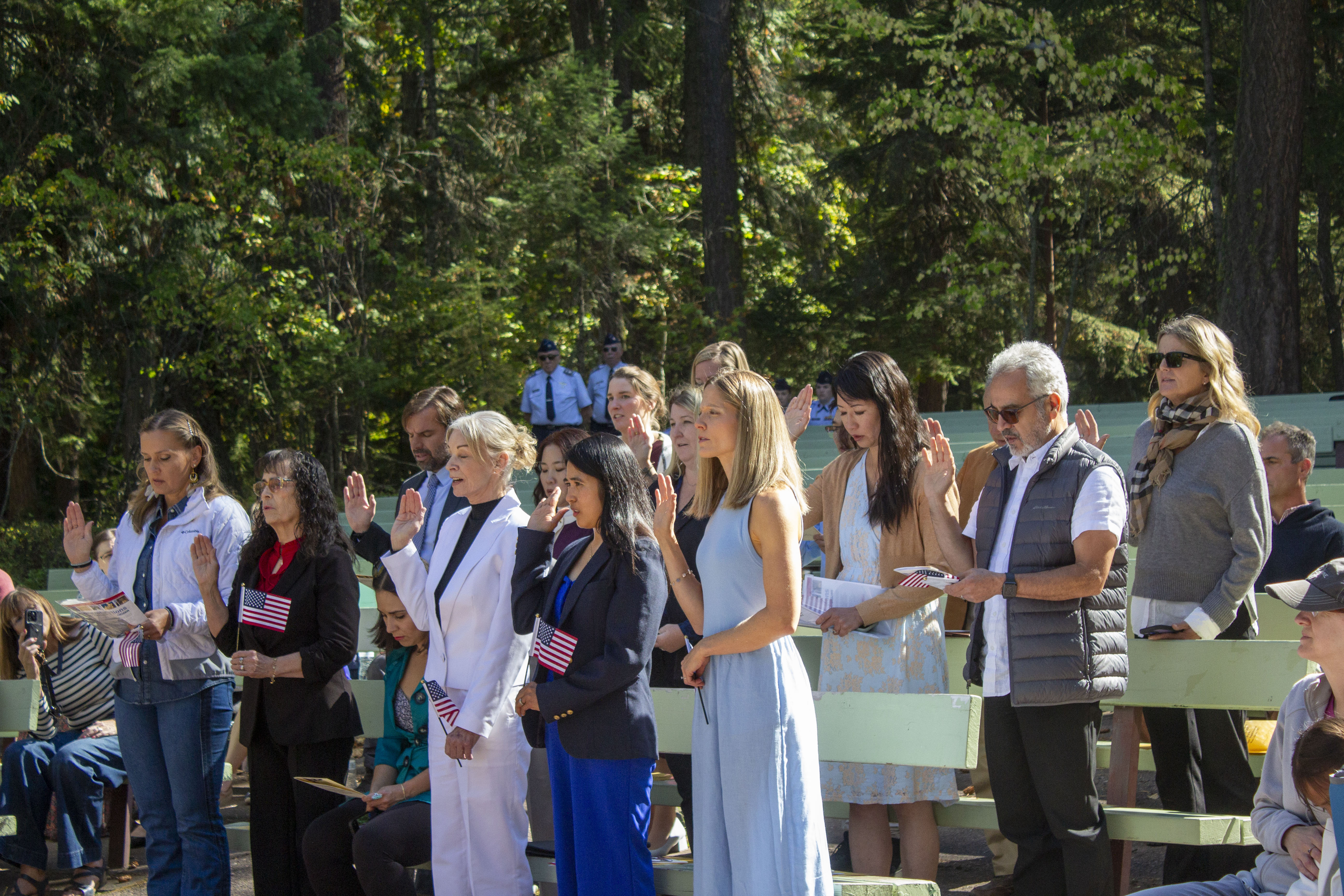
New citizens take the Oath of Allegiance in a naturalization ceremony at Glacier National Park in 2025.

A naturalization ceremony is an event at which a number of immigrants to the United States are naturalized, being administered the Oath of Allegiance, and thus become United States citizens. At the ceremony, participants turn in their green cards and are provided with the Certificate of Naturalization, confirming that they are now citizens. Naturalization ceremonies may be judicial ceremonies, conducted by a federal judge and typically at a federal courthouse, or administrative ceremonies, conducted by U.S. Citizenship and Immigration Services (USCIS).

Historically, immigrants to the United States were granted citizenship by federal judges during routine court proceedings. The Naturalization Act of 1906 made it more common for these proceedings to be completed on specific designated days, causing groups of immigrants to be naturalized together at the same time. A 1940 Congressional joint resolution asked judges to "address the newly naturalized citizen upon the form and genius of our Government and the privileges and responsibilities of citizenship", creating the current ceremonial process. While the Immigration Act of 1990 removed the authority of federal judges to naturalize citizens, placing that responsibility solely under USCIS, judges in most districts have continued to perform them as a final step in the USCIS-approved process.

Ceremony organizers are encouraged, but not required, to provide all participants with documents such as pocket Constitutions, copies of the Declaration of Independence and the Citizen's Almanac. Before the oath is administered, a video created by USCIS, "Faces of America", is shown and "The Star-Spangled Banner" is played. After the oath, participants are invited to recite the Pledge of Allegiance. At the end of the ceremony, new citizens are given the opportunity to register to vote, a process which varies by state.

Outside of federal courthouses, administrative ceremonies may be conducted at various special locations and times for symbolic purposes, and public and private properties may offer USCIS the use of their facilities unless they are religious, political, or commercial in nature. For example, a naturalization ceremony is held each year in the Rotunda for the Charters of Freedom at the National Archives Building in Washington, D.C., typically on September 17, Constitution Day and Citizenship Day, so that a group of new citizens swears to support the Constitution in the presence of the original engrossed copy of the Constitution and on the anniversary of its signing in 1787. Many ceremonies occur each year on July 4, Independence Day. Other frequent hosts of naturalization ceremonies include national parks, schools, sports venues, and presidential libraries.

It is common for the President of the United States or other elected officials to conduct or speak at administrative naturalization ceremonies. USCIS requires that these guest appearances must be politically neutral, and it forbids candidates for office from appearing at all in the three months leading up to their elections, with the exception of the President or Vice President.
