= Ali Sarwar Khan =

Bangladeshi politician

Nawab Ali Sarwar Khan

Personal details
- Born: 15 May 1924 Calcutta, Bengal Presidency
- Died: 21 June 1995 (aged 71) Bangladesh
- Party: Awami League
- Parent: Ali Haider Khan (father)
- Relatives: Ali Abbas Khan (nephew); Ali Amjad Khan (grandfather)
- Education: Aligarh Muslim University
- Nickname: Chunnu Nawab

Nawab Ali Sarwar Khan (15 May 1924 – 25 July 1995), also known by his daak naam Chunnu Nawab, was a Bangladeshi politician. He was a former MP based in Moulvibazar District.

== Early life and education ==
Ali Sarwar Khan was born 15 May 1924 in Calcutta, Bengal Presidency. He belonged to a Bengali Shi'ite noble family known as the Nawabs of Longla (or Prithimpasssa family) in Kulaura, South Sylhet. His father, Nawab Ali Haider Khan, was a notable politician and minister of Assam. His mother, Husna Ara Begum, was the eldest daughter of Nawab Wasif Ali Mirza of Murshidabad. Khan studied in Shillong, before proceeding his education at the Aligarh Muslim University.

== Career ==
As a member of the Awami League, Khan won a seat during the 1970 Pakistani general election in Kulaura although this term was disrupted by the Bangladesh Liberation War. He and his brother Ali Safdar Khan participated in the war as commanders of a regiment from the Tripura borders. He was one of the formulators of the 1972 Constitution of Bangladesh. He again won the seat in the 1973 Bangladeshi general election in Kulaura.
