= Farrakhan =

Farrakhan is the surname of the following people:

- Khadijah Farrakhan (born Betsy Ross, 1935–2026), African-American Muslim, wife of Louis
- Louis Farrakhan (born Louis Eugene Wolcott in 1933), American religious leader, activist, and social commentator
- Malik Farrakhan (born Tony King in 1946), American actor, political activist, and retired football player
- Mustapha Farrakhan, Jr. (born 1988), American basketball player

== See also ==
- Farrukhi (name)
- Farah (name)
- Farhan (name)
- Khan (surname)
