= Chantal Da Silva =

Freelance journalist

- Education: McMaster University (BA); University of Western Ontario (MA)
- Occupation: Journalist
- Employer: NBC News
- Known for: Breaking news writing and editing
- Website: https://chantaldasilva.com/

Chantal Khan Da Silva is a Canadian freelance journalist currently working for NBC News, who is a senior reporter and former chief correspondent to Newsweek. She has appeared on news channels from the BBC and NBC networks. Much of her news content is on immigration topics.

== Personal life ==
Da Silva grew up in a half Portuguese, half Pakistani household in Toronto, Canada. Both of her parents were immigrants. She is the sister to Danielle Khan Da Silva, founder of Photographers Without Borders. She is currently based out of London.

Da Silva has a B.A. in anthropology from McMaster University and an M.A. in journalism from Western University.

== Career ==
Da Silva is best known for her news coverage of immigration and human rights. She has been a staff journalist for multiple publications, including The Independent and CBC News. She has also written independently in many other publications, including The Guardian, Forbes, and CNN. Her work has also appeared in the Dhaka Tribune due to their partnership with Newsweek. She once described the struggles of being a freelance journalist, summarizing that it is often hard to get your news stories about migration accepted and placed if you are not a staff journalist and migration is not a hot topic.

Within Newsweek, she was appointed Senior Reporter in 2019, and later served as chief correspondent from 2020. She joined NBC News as an editor in 2021.

In 2019, she travelled to Honduras with UNICEF to investigate the fleeing due to violence.

Her work has also been cited in print publications, such as the book The Political Voices of Generation Z.

Some of her most impactful news stories have been reshared by other publications, notably a story of hers about Joe Rogan's remarks on COVID-19, which was linked from The Washington Post and the News Literacy Project. Her stories have also been linked from websites such as In the Public Interest and POLITICO.

She was one of the journalists who covered the detainment of Evan Gershkovich, as she published a popular story on in for NBC. Another story of hers that received buzz in other outlets was on 'Mini AOC', an 8-year-old who was pictured impersonating Alexandria Ocasio-Cortez.
