= Ali Haider Khan =

Bengali nobleman and politician

Nawab Minister Ali Haider Khan

Nawab of Longla
- In office 1905–1963
- Preceded by: Ali Amjad Khan
- Succeeded by: Ali Safdar Khan

Member of the Assam Legislative Assembly
- In office 1937–1946
- Prime Minister: Muhammed Saadulah
- Constituency: South Sylhet (East)

Personal details
- Born: 11 February 1896 Prithimpassa, South Sylhet, Bengal Presidency
- Died: 30 June 1963 (aged 67) Prithimpassa, Sylhet district, East Pakistan
- Resting place: Prithimpassa Nawab Bari, Kulaura
- Spouse: Nawabzadi Husna Ara Begum
- Children: 3, including Ali Sarwar Khan
- Parent: Ali Amjad Khan (father)
- Relatives: Prithimpassa family Wasif Ali Mirza (father-in-law)

Nawab Ali Haider Khan (11 February 1896 – 30 June 1963) was a Bengali noble and politician.

== Early life and family ==
Khan was born on 11 February 1896 to a royal Bengali Shia family known as the Nawabs of Longla based in the village of Prithimpassa in South Sylhet (then under the North-East Frontier province of the British Raj). The royal family are descended from Sakhi Salamat, a Persian nobleman from Greater Khorasan, who settled in Prithimpassa after being granted land there by the Lodi sultans of Delhi in the 15th century. Khan's father, Nawab Ali Amjad Khan, was an honorary magistrate by occupation. His mother, Syeda Fatima Banu, was the daughter of Syed Aminuddin Hasan of Narpati West Haveli in Chunarughat, Habiganj and a descendant of Syed Nasiruddin.

== Career ==
The Assam Legislative Assembly was founded in 1937, and Khan won a seat in its first elections in the South Sylhet (East) constituency. Khan served as Assam's Minister of Agriculture in the cabinet of Sir Muhammed Saadulah. From 1942 to 1946, he was the Minister of Power and Water Development in Gopinath Bordoloi's cabinet. He was also the leader of the Independent Muslim Party. In 1945, he led his party into an alliance with Assam Congress and its coalition partners which included the likes of Bordoloi and Fakhruddin Ali Ahmed (who later became the President of India). Bordoloi considered Khan as their mainstay.

In 1950, he hosted King Mohammad Reza Pahlavi of Iran and Governor-General Khwaja Nazimuddin at his estate for four days and went hunting with them.

== Personal life ==
In 1917, he married Nawabzadi Husna Ara Begum, the eldest child of Nawab Wasif Ali Mirza of Murshidabad. They had three children – Ali Safdar Khan, Syedunnessa Begum and Ali Sarwar Khan. He also had a son named Ali Dawar Khan.

== Death ==
Khan died on 30 June 1963, in the village of Prithimpassa.

| Preceded by Ali Amjad Khan | Nawab of Longla; 1905–1963 | Succeeded by Ali Safdar Khan |
