= Farrukhi (name) =

Farakhi, Farrakhi, Farokhi, Farrokhi, Farrukhi, Farukhi, or Farkhi (Persian: فرخي, Urdu: فرخی) is a surname of Persian origin. Notable people with the name include:

== Surname ==
=== Farrokhi ===
- Bahram Rashidi Farrokhi (born 1992), Iranian footballer
- Mohammad Farrokhi Yazdi (1889–1939), Iranian poet, journalist, and politician
- Parviz Farrokhi (born 1968), Iranian beach volleyball player
- Saeed Farrokhi (Born 1984), Iranian karate practitioner and former coach of the Iranian national karate team.

=== Farrukhi ===
- Abu'l-Hasan Ali ibn Julugh Farrukhi Sistani (1000–1040), Persian poet
- Asif Farrukhi (1959–2020), Pakistani writer, editor, and translator
- Aslam Farrukhi (1923–2016), Pakistani author, critic, poet, linguist, scholar, and broadcaster

== See also ==
- Farrakhan
