= In the Public Interest =

In the Public Interest (ITPI) is a nonpartisan non-profit organization based in Oakland, California, that studies public education, infrastructure, social services, and other public goods. According to its website, ITPI “helps community organizations, advocacy groups, public officials, researchers, and the general public understand how the privatization of public goods impacts service quality, democracy, equity, and government budgets.” The organization also “advocates for responsible contracting" and "reclaiming and building popular support for public institutions that work for all of us". It focuses on five main issues: Democracy and Good Government; Education; Infrastructure; Privatization; and Public Services.

ITPI is a fiscal project of PowerSwitch Action, a 501(c)(3) nonpartisan, non-profit organization based in Oakland.

== History ==
ITPI was founded in 2009 by its current executive director, Donald Cohen, coauthor of the book The Privatization of Everything. The organization is funded through grants from a variety of foundations and non-corporate organizations, as well as private donations from individuals.

In 2016, U.S. Sen. Bernie Sanders, then a presidential candidate for the Democratic Party, renewed calls to ban private prisons after seeing a report from ITPI that estimated the top two private prison operators made $361 million in profits in 2015.

In 2018, Cohen advised Pittsburgh Bill Peduto on engaging in a potential public-private partnership for the city's municipal water system.

== Notable publications ==
In 2013, ITPI published the report, "Criminal: How Lockup Quotas and ‘Low-Crime Taxes’ Guarantee Profits for Private Prison Corporations," exposing the use of prison bed occupancy guarantee clauses in private prison contracts. The report also explored how bed occupancy guarantees undermine criminal justice policy and democratic, accountable government.

In 2016, ITPI published “How Privatization Increases Inequality,” a report examining the ways in which the insertion of private interests into the provision of public goods and services, including education, social services, and water, hurts poor individuals and families, and people of color.

In 2016, ITPI published "The Banks That Finance Private Prison Companies," a report revealing that six banks had played large roles in providing credit, bonds, and loans to private prison companies. The six banks included Wells Fargo, Bank of America, JPMorgan Chase, BNP Paribas, SunTrust, and U.S. Bancorp. This research helped lead to all of the publicly known existing banking partners providing lines of credit and term loans to private prison leader GEO Group, Inc. committing to ending ties with the private prison and immigrant detention industry in 2019. GEO took issue with the report. "The divestment efforts against our company are based on a false narrative and a deliberate mischaracterization of our role as a long-standing government services provider,” the company said in a statement.

In 2019, ITPI published the report, "The Cost of Charter Schools for Public School Districts," examining the fiscal impact of charter schools on four California school districts. ITPI's calculations helped lead California to overhaul state laws detailing how charter schools are authorized, authorizing local school districts to act on behalf of parents, students, and communities. The report was authored by Gordon Lafer, Ph.D., a political economist and professor at the University of Oregon's Labor Education and Research Center. The California Charter Schools Association, which advocates for an increase in charter schools, called the report "an error-ridden document commissioned by a biased organization with a political agenda and conclusion in mind."
