= Farakhi, South Khorasan =

Farakhi فرخي
- Village
- Location within Iran
- Coordinates: 33°49′48″N 59°31′49″E
- Country: Iran
- Province: South Khorasan
- County: Qaen
- Bakhsh: Central
- Rural District: Qaen

Population (2006)
  - Total: 311
- Time zone: UTC+3:30 (IRST)
  - Summer (DST): UTC+4:30 (IRDT)

Farakhi (Persian: فرخي, also Romanized as Farākhī, Farokhī, Farkhī, Farrokhī, and Farrukhi) is a village in Qaen Rural District, in the Central District of Qaen County, South Khorasan Province, Iran. At the 2006 census, its population was 311, in 62 families.
