= Prithimpassa family =

Shia noble family from Bangladesh

Prithimpassa পৃথিমপাশা
- Current region: Kulaura, Moulvibazar, Sylhet
- Etymology: Prithim pasha
- Origin: Greater Khorasan, Persia
- Founder: Sakhi Salamat
- Members: Ismail Khan Lodi; Nawab Ali Amjad Khan; Nawab Ali Haider Khan; Nawab Ali Abbas Khan
- Connected families: Nawab of Murshidabad; Nawab of Awadh; Nawab of Patna; Zamindars of Monraj
- Estates: Prithimpassa Nawab Estate; Monraj Saheb Estate; Prithimpassa Suto Saheb Estate

The Prithimpassa family, also known as the Nawabs of Longla, are a Shia royal family from the Prithimpassa Union, Kulaura Upazila, Moulvibazar, Sylhet, Bangladesh. The family was of the erstwhile feudal nobility of East Bengal. They played important roles in the Indian Rebellion of 1857, the Partition of India and Sylhet referendum in 1947, and the Bangladesh Liberation War of 1971.

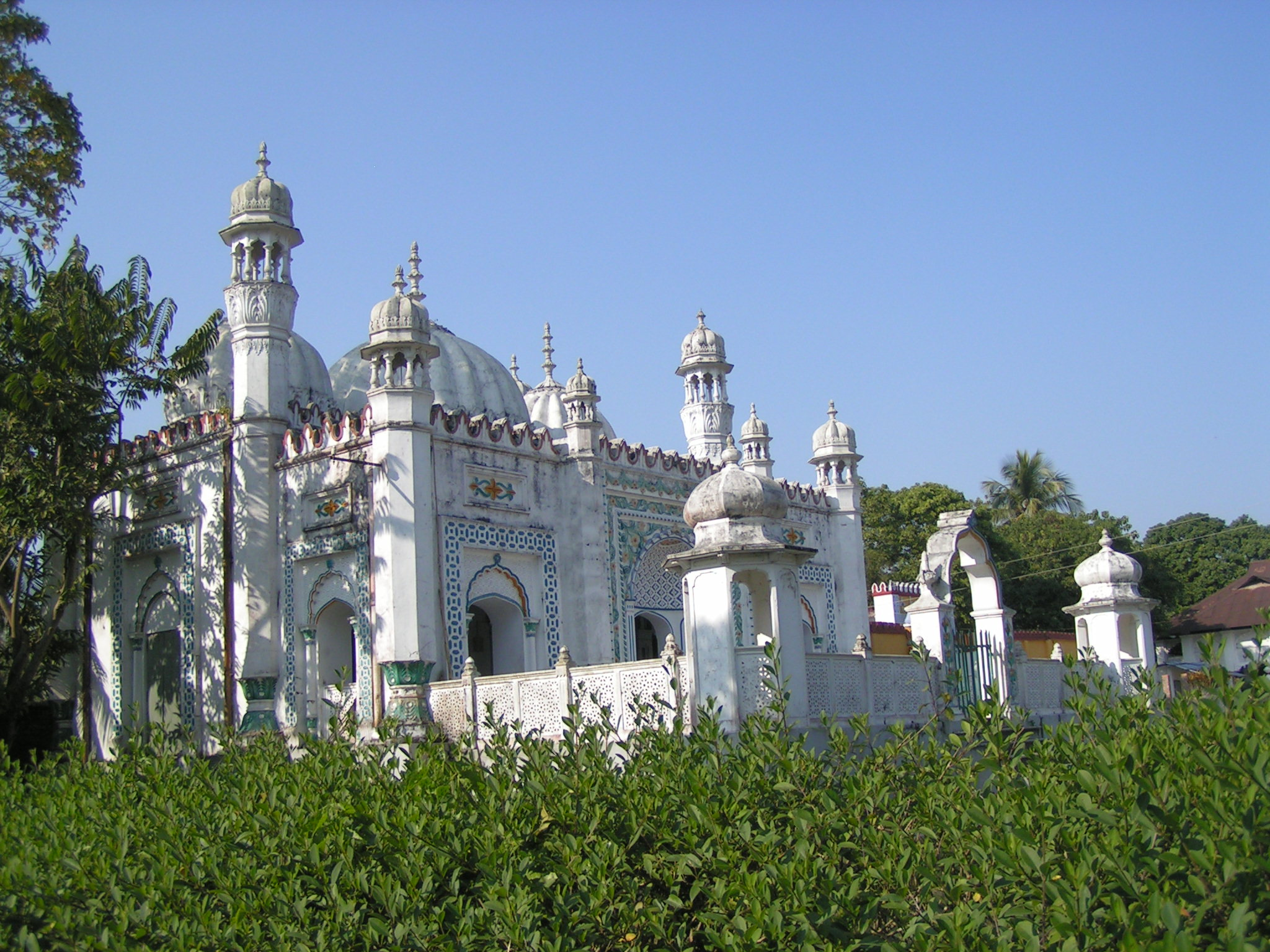
Shia Mosque at Prithimpassa Estate

== Origin ==
The family was founded by Sakhi Salamat, a Shi'ite Persian nobleman from Khorasan province, Greater Khorasan an area near the Afghanistan-Iran border which falls in present-day Iran. Salamat had arrived in the Indian subcontinent at the end of the 15th century. After initially residing at the court of the Lodi sultans of Delhi, he later moved to Sylhet, where he was granted land in the Prithimpassa mouza (located in the pargana of Longla) and first married the daughter of Birchandra Narayan, a Hindu prince of the Ita royal family in Rajnagar mouza.

== History ==
Dev Bhallav, a Brahmin Shiqdar of Longla, was on a pilgrimage when he needed money, and so he borrowed fifteen gold coins from Salamat. On another occasion, Salamat visited Bhallav's home and Bhallav's daughter appeared in front of them out of curiosity. Salamat arbitrarily spat and the saliva fell on the body of Bhallav's daughter. In reaction, Bhallav deemed that both of their Brahmin status had been lost and thus married her off to Salamat, and then migrated to Kashidham.

Ismail Khan Lodi was the son of Sakhi Salamat. He was titled Nawab Amir-ul-Umara in the court of Daud Khan Karrani, Sultan of Bengal. The father of the King, Sulaiman Khan Karrani made him the Governor of Orissa. The title Khan-e-Jahan was later conferred on him by Daud Khan too. He married the daughter of Daud Khan. Ismail Khan Lodi partook in the Battle of Rajmahal against the Mughal Empire. After Akbar saw Ismail's bravery he took the aid of his general Shaikh Alauddin Chisti and made Ismail Khan Lodi the local Nawab and provided him assurance over his rule. Ismail had a son named Nawab Shams ad-Din Muhammad Khan (1624–1682).

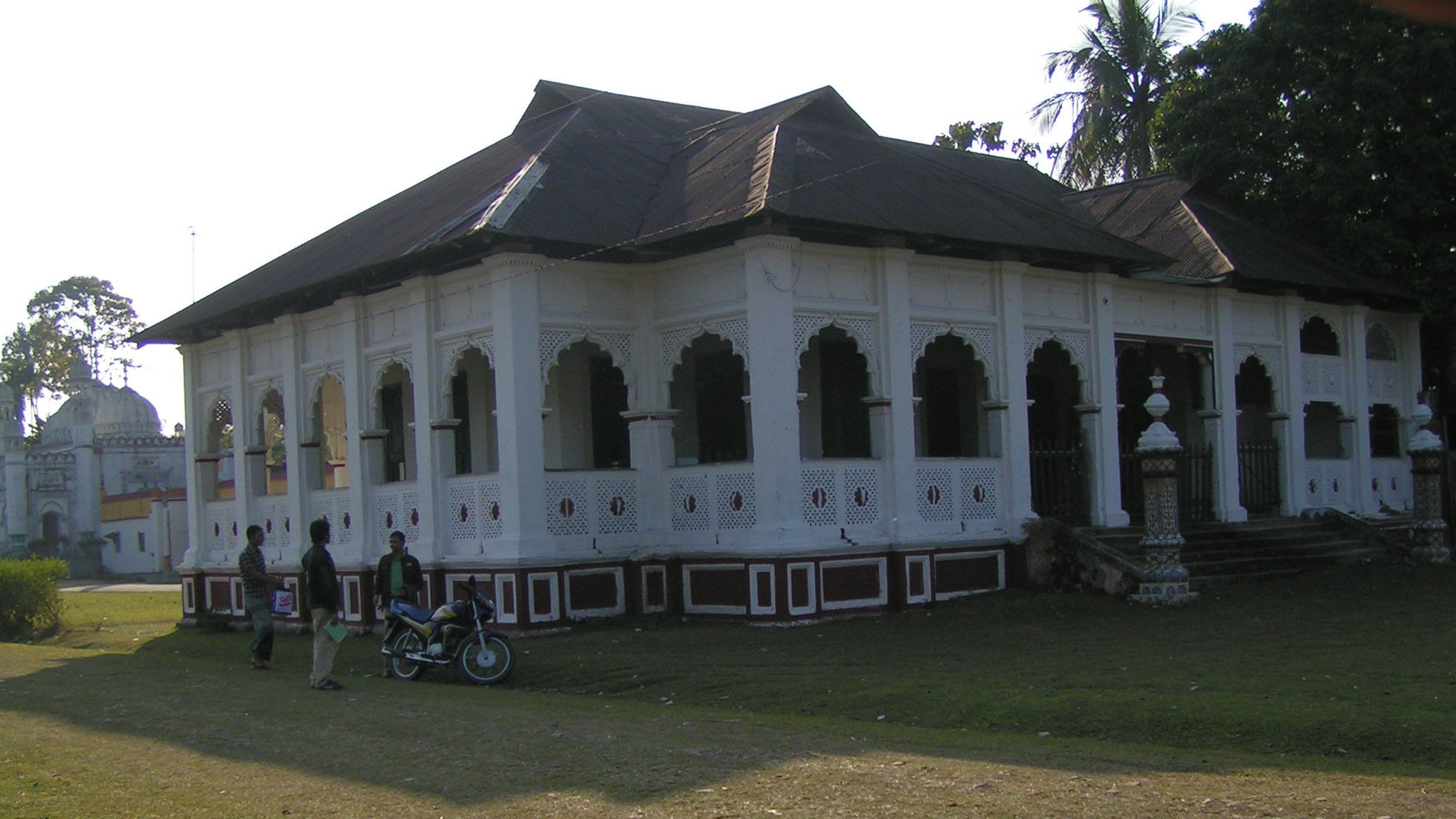
Prithimpassa Imambara

Ismail's grandson was Muhammad Rabi Khan (d. 1774), who grew to become a respected maulvi and scholar of Persian at the court of the Nawab of Bengal Alivardi Khan in Murshidabad as well as the Naib Nazim of Dhaka. He became a teacher to several children of the ruling Nawab family which included Sarfaraz Khan, Zain ud-Din Ahmed Khan and Nawazish Muhammad Khan. On one occasion, a scorpion entered into his jama without Rabi noticing, whilst he was assembled at the Nawab's court. A while later, the scorpion bit into Rabi, burning his skin and turning him red-faced. Intending to maintain his professionalism at the court, Rabi strived to keep his posture and not react loudly. However, those close to him including Nawab Alivardi Khan noticed something was wrong and asked him what the problem was to which Rabi explained. Impressed by how much respect Rabi showed to him, Alivardi Khan subsequently granted him the title of Danishmand (learned one in Persian) for his wisdom as well as large jagirs in 1735. Rabi returned to Prithimpassa after Alivardi's death and also received land-grants from the likes of Nawab Mir Qasim and Emperor Alamgir II. There was even a calendar in his honour at the palaces of the Nawabs in Murshidabad. In 1756, he founded a bazaar near the family estate known as Rabir Bazar (Rabi's market) which remains in existence today in the Kulaura Upazila.

Rabi Khan's son was Muhammad Ali Khan. Muhammad served as the Assistant Qadi of Sylhet in 1773 and later served as the Qadi of Taraf. He assisted the British forces against the rebellious Naga and Kuki tribes in 1793 and as a reward received his own troops and a jagir. Ali Zafar Khan was the second son of Muhammad Ali Khan. He established the Zamindars of Monraj a hereditary family under the Prithimpassa Nawab. Zafar was a Nawabzada by birth and classed as a Zamindar. His established family is currently headed by his descendants.

Gaus Ali Khan was Muhammad's elder son and he was notable for sheltering 300 insurgent sepoys who had looted the Chittagong Treasury during the Indian Rebellion of 1857.

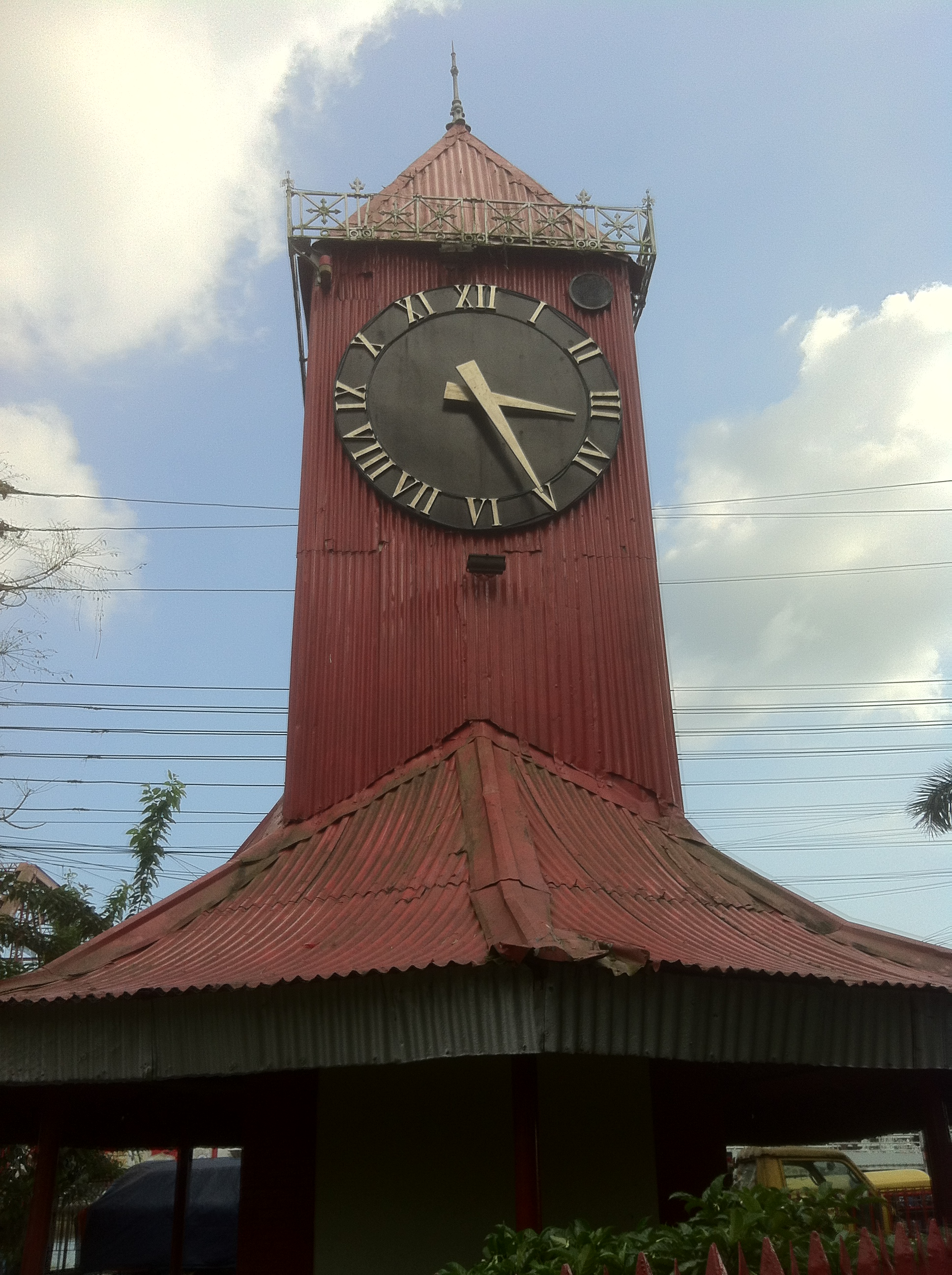
Ali Amjad's Clock in Sylhet town.

Moulvi Nawab Ali Amjad Khan (1871–1905), an Honorary Magistrate and educationist, had hobbies of horse riding, polo and hunting. He was known to have single-handedly shot 43 tigers. During his tenure, the family had become the wealthiest in Sylhet. He founded the Rangirchhara Tea Estate, the largest native-run tea garden in Bengal. The estate library was opened in 1921. In 1932, he established the Ali Amjad Government Girls' High School in Moulvibazar. He gave out scholarships to schools across Assam and Chittagong, awarded gold medals to students in Tripura, financially assisted needy students and joined the Aligarh Muslim University Committee. In 1901, he accompanied Lord Curzon to Silchar. He gifted a poor boy in his area with one of his own elephants. During a trip to Calcutta, he got typhoid fever and died. Amjad's wife was Syeda Fatima Banu, daughter of Syed Aminuddin Hasan of the Narpati Haveli Bari in Chunarughat, Habiganj. They had two sons; Ali Haider and Ali Asghar.

Nawab Ali Haider Khan (1896 – 30 June 1963) was politically active throughout the early 20th century. His work included serving as Minister of Agriculture in the cabinet of Muhammed Saadulah, serving as Minister of Power and Water Development in the cabinet of Gopinath Bordoloi, leading the Independent Muslim Party and playing a prominent role in the 1947 Sylhet referendum. He was a member of the Assam Legislative Assembly from 1937 to 1946.

Ali Safdar Khan (1919–1974), popularly known as Raja Saheb, was the eldest son of Haider and born in the Hazarduari Palace at Murshidabad. Wife: Sahebzadi Sirajunessa Khatun, the second daughter of Ali Ather Khan from Prithimpassa Chhoto shaheb bari. Safdar was a leftist political leader of the Ballisara peasant movement of the 1960s. He and his brother Ali Sarwar Khan (15 May 1924 – 21 July 1995) took part in the Bangladesh Liberation War as commanders of a regiment from the Tripura borders. Safdar later died on 1974 in Dhaka. Safdar's own son, Ali Abbas Khan was a former member of parliament, educationist and social worker. Safdar's other son, Ali Naqi Khan, was a chairman of Prithimpasha Union Parishad. Safdar's other son, Ali Baquar Khan Hasnain was also a chairman of Prithimpassa Union Parishad.

Ali Sarwar Khan (1924–1995), He was the youngest child of Nawab Ali Haider Khan. Wife: Sahebzadi Syedatunnessa Begum, the eldest daughter of Nawab of Patna, India MLA Nawabzada Syed Mohammad Mehdi. He was twice MLA during his political tenure. They got married in 1948, October in Patna India in Bawli the Mansion of Nawabzada Syed Mohammad Mehdi. He had his education from St. Edmonds, Shillong and Aligarh University, India. He was a very conscientious and disciplined man and was a very good sportsman. In school he earned his name in boxing. In his father's Estate he played a prominent and constructive role. He was an accomplished hunter and was a consummate tea planter. During his early years he worked in Etah Tea Estate in 1951. He was twice Member of Constituent Assembly. The first time, on 9 December 1970, and again in 1973. He was a freedom fighter and was in charge of the Tripura front. He set up the Muraicherra Tea Estate tea manufacturing factory at the Tea Estate. He died on 21 July 1995 in Dhaka. His son Ali Hamid Khan was a Historian and Social Worker. His other son Ali Wajid Khan was the Senior vice president of Kulaura Upazila Awami League.

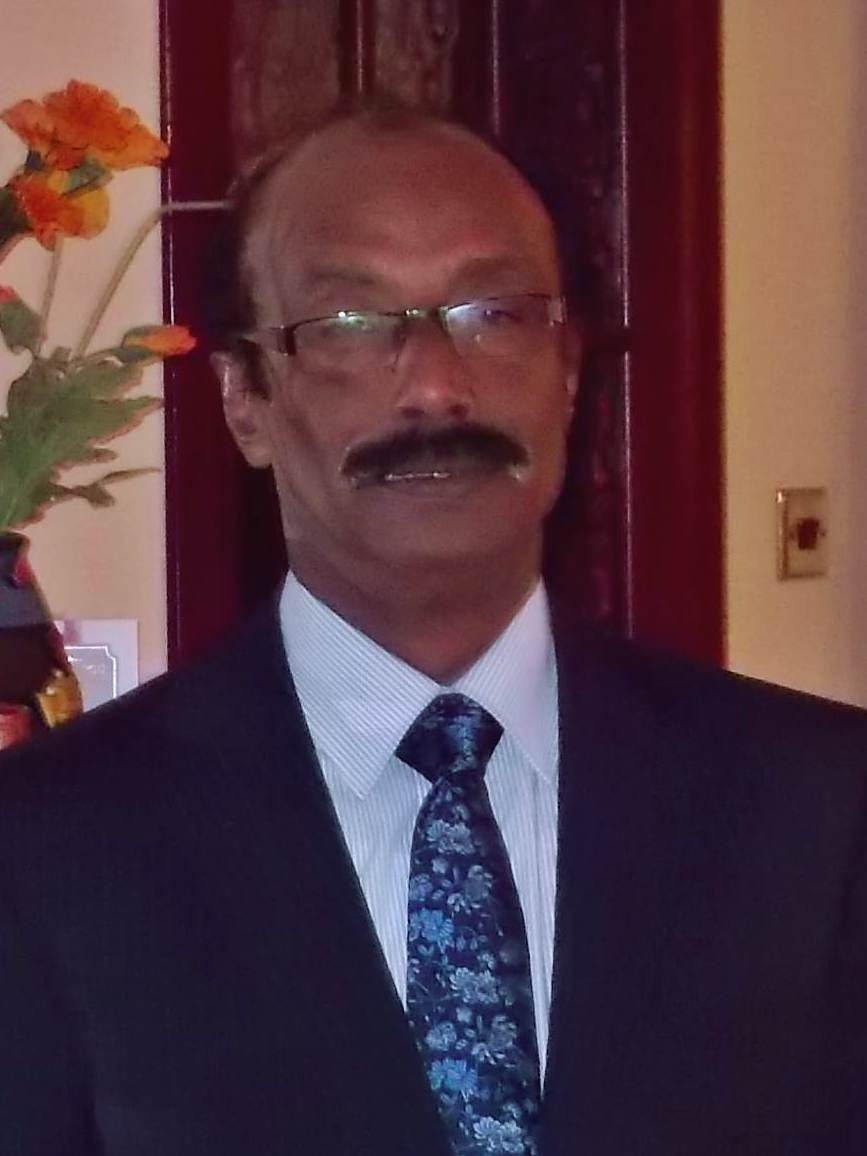
Member of the Jatiya Sangsad, Nawab Ali Abbas Khan.

== Zamindars of Monraj ==
The Zamindars of Monraj (Bengali: মনরাজের জমিদার), also known as the Monraj Saheb family (Bengali: মনরাজ সাহেব খান্দান), were the erstwhile aristocrats of Monraj village, Kulaura, Moulvibazar District, Bangladesh. The Zamindars of Monraj are a branch of the Prithimpassa family who were the erstwhile Nawabs of Longla. The family are Shia's. Some of the family have migrated to Overseas.

=== Origin ===
The Monraj Saheb family was founded by Nawabzada Ali Zafar Khan who was the second son of Nawab Qazi Muhammad Ali Khan of Prithimpassa and the younger brother of Nawab Gaus Ali Khan. The family's earliest recorded ancestor, Sakhi Salamat, was a Persian nobleman from Greater Khorasan. who had arrived in the Indian subcontinent at the end of the 15th century. After initially residing at the court of the Lodi sultans of Delhi, he later moved to Sylhet, where he was granted land in the Prithimpassa mouza (located in the pargana of Longla).

=== History ===
The Zamindars of Monraj held a lot of land in Kulaura, Shillong, Manipur, Assam, Tripura and other parts of India. One of the most notable assets owned was the Coal mine in Nagaland. The family held all these properties until the East Bengal State Acquisition and Tenancy Act of 1950.

Nawabzada Ali Zafar Khan was the first Zamindar of Monraj and the Son of Prithimpassa's Nawab Muhammad Ali Khan. Ali Zafar married into the Ghagtia Chowdhury Bari of Kulaura, and had two sons the youngest being Ali Gohor Khan.

Zamindar Ali Gohor Khan was the 2nd Zaminder of Monraj and the Second son of Nawabzada Ali Zafar Khan. Ali Gohor was a strong supporter of the Muslim Party. He had his education from Aligarh University. Ali Gohor married into the Koula Chowdhury Bari of Kulaura and had two sons named Ali Akthar Khan and Ali Afsar Khan. Due to his marriage into Koula he became related to the Kanihati Chaudhury family.

Zamindar Ali Ashjad Khan was the 3rd Zaminder of Monraj and the eldest grandson of Nawabzada Ali Zafar through his first child. Ali Ashjad had 4 daughters but no sons. One daughter married Abdul Jabbar Chowdhury of the Bizli Chowdhury family. Another married Syed Shamsuddin Hussain of Tarpi Saheb Bari. Another married Zamindar Syed Ali Akthar of Pallakandi Saheb Bari and another married Zamindar Ali Ather Khan of Prithimpassa Chhoto Saheb Bari.

Zamindar Ali Akthar Khan born in 1893 was the last Zaminder of Monraj. He was the final Zamindar up until the East Bengal State Acquisition and Tenancy Act of 1950. During his tenure he purchased a lot of land in Kailashahar, Shillong, Guwahati and Manipur. And he also started a partnership business in a coal mine at Nagaland. He studied at the Presidency University, Kolkata. Ali Akthar married Syeda Nadira Banu from Narapati West Haveli, Habiganj. Through this marriage he became the brother-in-law of Syed Gaziul Haque the grandson of Nawab Faizunnesa. His wife Nadira Banu was the direct descendant of Syed Nasiruddin, hence the Monraj Shaheb Family became related to the Syeds of Taraf. Ali Akthar had two sons, Anwar and Zafar. Ali Akthar died in 1971.

Ali Anwar Khan was the Saheb of Monraj. He studied at Saint Edmund's School in Shillong. He then studied at MC College. After his studies, he obtained a job in the Bangladesh Water Development Board. Ali Anwar married Pirzadi Syeda Sanwara Akther from Nasirpur Saheb Bari Brahmanbaria. Syeda Sanwara Akther was also a direct descendant of Syed Nasiruddin. Anwar had 2 sons named Ali Azhar Khan and Ali Asrar Khan and 2 daughters. Ali Anwar died in 2016.

Ali Zafar Khan (Kona Shaheb) was the second son of Ali Akthar. He was the Headmaster of Champa Ray Tea Estate in Kamalganj. He married Jamila Khatun Chowdhury of Durmut Chowdhury Bari of Habiganj and has two sons named Ali Ashraf Khan and Ali Imran Khan. He lived in Chunarughat until his death in 2023.

Ali Imam Khan (Bason Shaheb) was the only son of Ali Afsar. He lived in Monraj his entire life until his death. He has 4 sons named Ali Raja Khan, Ali Khan, Ali Sabbir Khan, Ali Manjil Khan and 2 daughters.

Ali Asrar Khan (Ripon) is second son of Ali Anwar Khan and the current Head of the Monraj Shaheb Family. He resides in London.
