= Pocket Constitution =

Pocket-sized copy of the United States Constitution

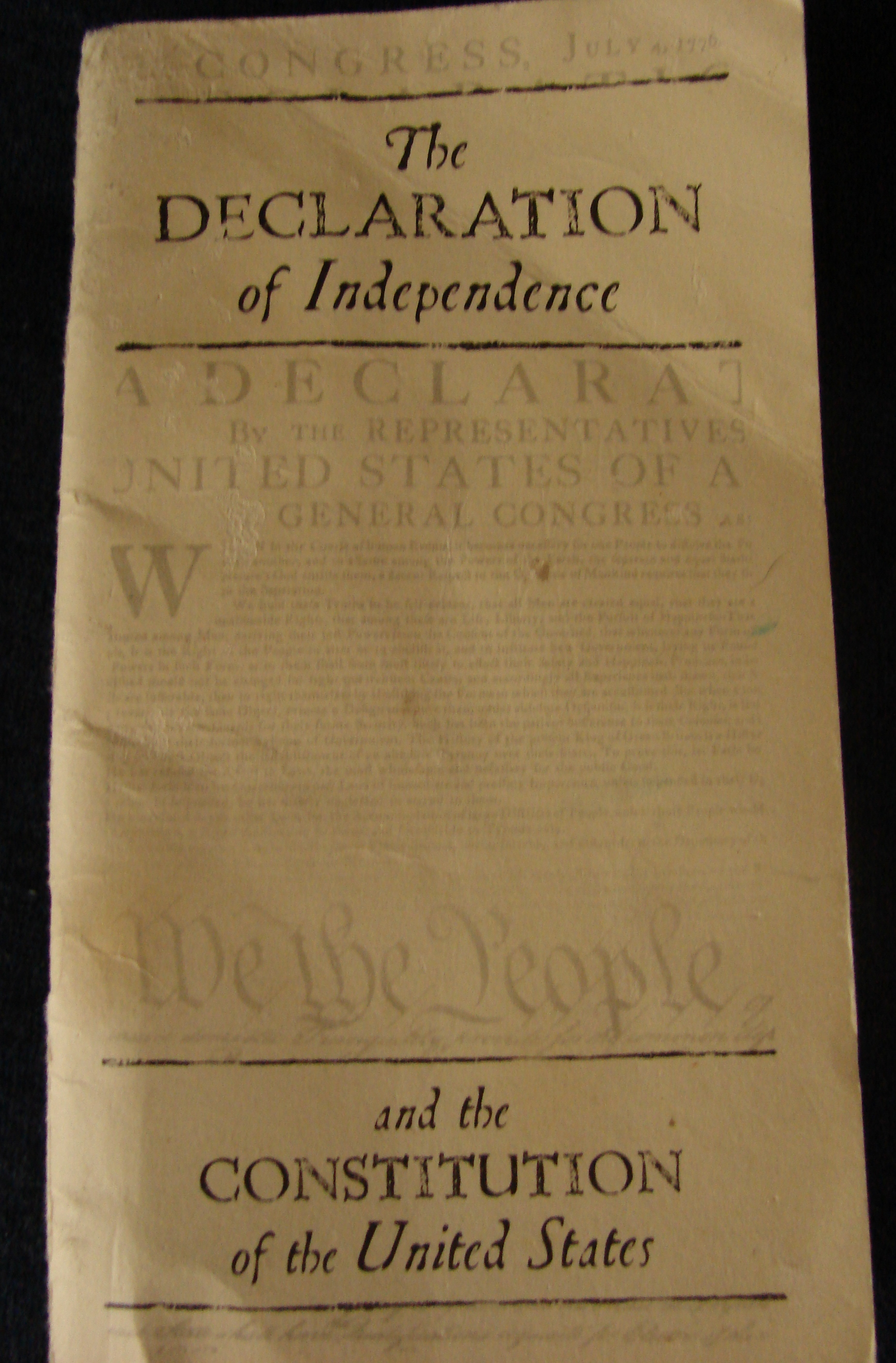
A pocket constitution, published together with the Declaration of Independence. This particular copy is from the Colonial Williamsburg Foundation.

A pocket Constitution is a printed copy of the United States Constitution that is pocket-sized or pamphlet-sized and can fit in a pocket, purse, or other small container for portability.

== History ==
Although the text of the Constitution is easily accessible for free online, including a printable version via the National Archives and Records Administration, The New York Times reported in 2016 that, "pocket-size versions come with an added feature — a physical representation of Americans' rights that can be hoisted during a congressional hearing, political rally or a spirited discussion with a police officer."

=== Distribution ===
Although sometimes identified with the Tea Party movement, which have distributed large numbers of them, pocket Constitutions have been used by figures and advocacy groups on both the left and right for many years. Former ACLU president Susan Herman says that the first time she can recall a prominent politician using a pocket Constitution for effect was during the Watergate hearings in 1973, when U.S. Senator Sam Ervin, the chair of the Senate Watergate Committee, pulled out his pocket Constitution, making a "powerful visual impact."

A number of organizations publish and distribute pocket Constitutions either through sales or via free giveaways, including the U.S. Government Publishing Office (GPO), which sells copies for $1.50 as of 2016, the American Civil Liberties Union, which publishes them in large numbers and usually sells copies for $5 but began offering them for free after Khizr Khan displayed one in an emotional speech at the 2016 Democratic National Convention, the American Constitution Society for Law and Policy, The Heritage Foundation, Hillsdale College, which currently gives them away for free to anyone who requests one, and the Cato Institute, which has given copies away for free to members of Congress and others in both English and Spanish.

=== Carriers ===
Since the late 20th century, several former and current political and legal leaders have been known for displaying pocket Constitutions in speeches or presentations, or carrying them all the time, including:

- Paul Broun, former U.S. Representative from Georgia
- Ammon Bundy and LaVoy Finicum who occupied the Malheur National Wildlife Refuge in 2016
- Stephen Breyer, U.S. Supreme Court associate justice
- Robert C. Byrd, former U.S. Senator from West Virginia
- Nancy Grace, television news commentator
- Peter Jennings, former anchor of ABC News' World News Tonight
- Khizr Khan, Gold Star father
- Brett Kavanaugh, U.S. Supreme Court associate justice
- Dennis Kucinich, for U.S. Representative from Ohio
- Mike Lee, U.S. Senator from Utah
- Carl Levin, U.S. Senator from Michigan
- Trent Lott, former U.S. Senator from Mississippi
- William Van Alstyne, Marshall-Wythe School of Law professor
