= Hoseyn Farakhi =

Hoseyn Farakhi حسين فرخي
- Village
- Country: Iran
- Province: Khuzestan
- County: Ahvaz
- Bakhsh: Central
- Rural District: Elhayi

Population (2006)
  - Total: 64
- Time zone: UTC+3:30 (IRST)
  - Summer (DST): UTC+4:30 (IRDT)

Hoseyn Farakhi (Persian: حسين فرخي, also Romanized as Ḩoseyn Farakhī) is a village in Elhayi Rural District, in the Central District of Ahvaz County, Khuzestan Province, Iran. At the 2006 census, its population was 64, in 11 families.
