= Saeed Farrokhi =

Personal information
- National team: Karate Iran
- Born: 1 August 1984 (age 42) Tehran, Iran
- Occupations: Athlete, Karate coach

Sport
- Sport: Karate
- Event: Kumite
Medal record
Representing Iran
Men's Karate
Asian Youth and Junior Championships
Silver medal – second place	Japan 2002	Team Kumite
Bronze medal – third place	Japan 2002	Individual Kumite
World Karate Championships
Gold medal – first place	France 2003	Individual Kumite
Gold medal – first place	France 2003	Team Kumite
Bronze medal – third place	Finland 2006	Individual Kumite
Bronze medal – third place	France 2012	Team Kumite
Asian Karate Championships
Gold medal – first place	Chinese Taipei 2004	Individual Kumite
Silver medal – second place	Chinese Taipei 2004	Team Kumite
Gold medal – first place	Macau 2005	Team Kumite
Bronze medal – third place	Macau 2005	Individual Kumite
Gold medal – first place	China 2009	Individual Kumite
Gold medal – first place	China 2009	Team Kumite
Gold medal – first place	China 2011	Individual Kumite
Gold medal – first place	China 2011	Team Kumite
Bronze medal – third place	Uzbekistan 2012	Team Kumite
Asian Games
Bronze medal – third place	Qatar 2006	Individual Kumite
Islamic Solidarity Games
Gold medal – first place	Saudi Arabia 2005	Individual Kumite
Gold medal – first place	Saudi Arabia 2005	Team Kumite
World University Games
Bronze medal – third place	Montenegro 2010	Team Kumite
World Clubs Championships
Silver medal – second place	Turkey 2011	Team

Saeed Farrokhi (born 1 August 1984 in Tehran) is an Iranian karate practitioner and former coach of the Iranian national karate team.

He has won various medals and titles at Asian and World championships, the Asian Games, and the Islamic Solidarity Games.
