= Khizr and Ghazala Khan =

Parents of a US Army captain killed in Iraq

Khizr Khan
- Born: Khizr Muazzam Khan; 1950 (age 75–76); Gujranwala, Pakistan
- Citizenship: Pakistani; American
- Education: Punjab University Law College (LLB); University of Missouri (LLM); Harvard University (LLM)
- Awards: Presidential Medal of Freedom (2022)

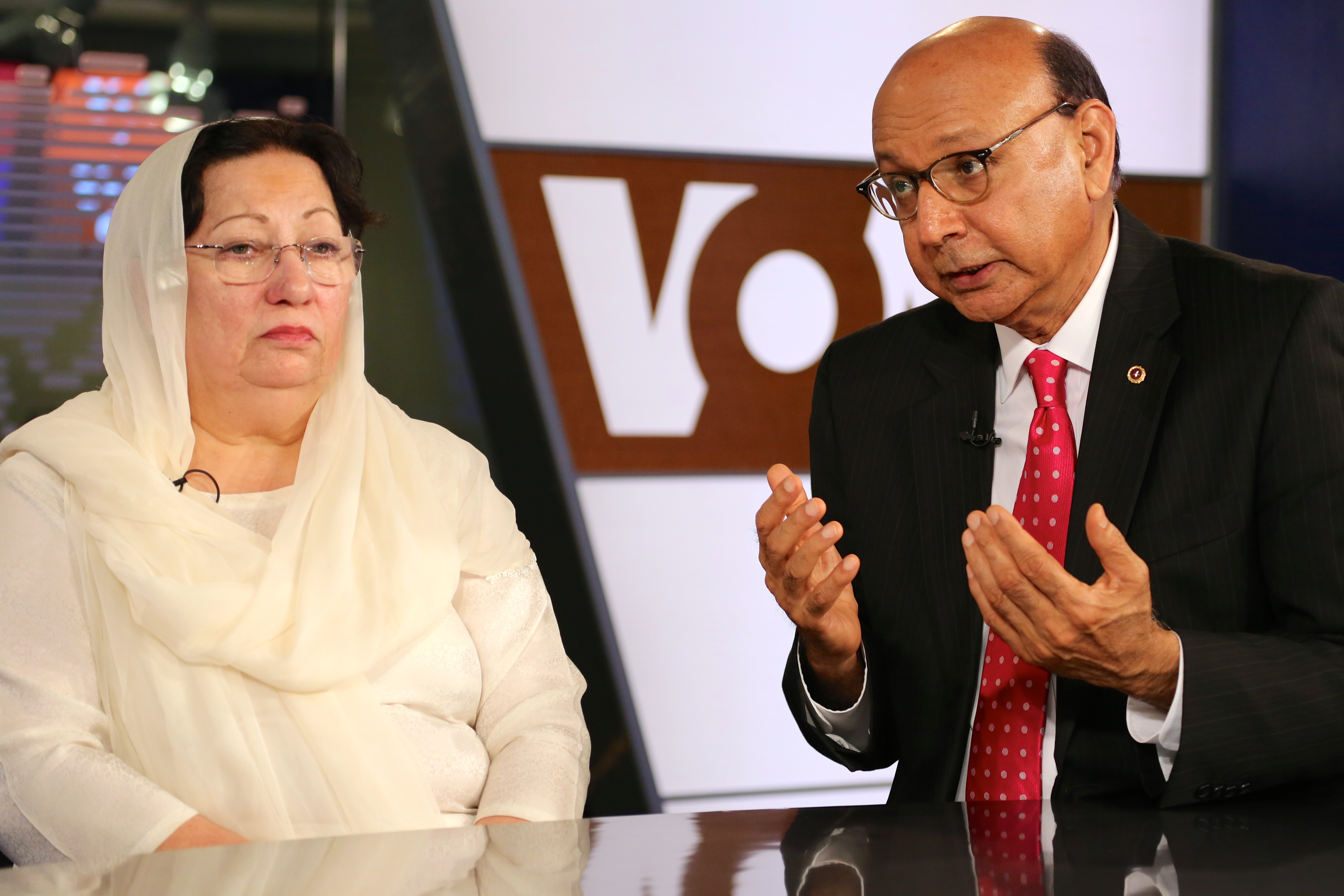
Ghazala and Khizr Khan speak with VOA's Urdu service in Washington, D.C., August 1, 2016

Ghazala Khan
- Born: 1951 (age 74–75); Faisalabad, Pakistan
- Citizenship: Pakistani; American
- Education: University of the Punjab (BA)

Khizr Muazzam Khan (born 1950) and Ghazala Khan (born 1951) are the Pakistani American parents of United States Army Captain Humayun Khan, who was killed in 2004 during the Iraq War. The couple received international attention following a speech at the 2016 Democratic National Convention that criticized Republican presidential candidate Donald Trump.

== Biography ==
Khizr Khan was born in 1950, the eldest of ten children, to poultry farming parents in Gujranwala, a city in Pakistan's Punjab Province. Ghazala is also from Punjab, born in 1951 in Faisalabad. The couple met while attending the University of the Punjab, where Ghazala studied Persian and Khizr pursued an LL.B from Punjab University Law College. Khizr passed the Punjab bar in 1974. Once married, the couple moved to Dubai in the United Arab Emirates to earn money to move to the United States. Two of their sons, Shaharyar and Humayun, were born in Dubai.

=== Immigration to the United States ===
The Khans moved from the UAE to the United States in 1980. Their first home in the US was in Houston, Texas, where the family stayed while Khizr earned LL.M. degrees from the University of Missouri Law School in 1982 and Harvard Law School in 1986. In 1986 they also became American citizens. Khizr, Ghazala, and their two sons then moved to Silver Spring, Maryland, where their third son, Omer, was born.

Khizr went on to work at the Washington, D.C., office of the law firm of Hogan & Hartson, one of the largest law firms in the United States, where he was employed as the firm's manager of litigation technology from 2000 to 2007.

=== Death of Humayun Khan ===
The Khan's middle child, Humayun, attended the University of Virginia, where he became a cadet in its Army ROTC program. Upon graduating in 2000, he was commissioned in the Army as a way to earn money for law school and because, according to Khizr, Humayun "felt that ROTC had completed him as a person, and he wanted to give back." He rose to the rank of captain and served in Iraq during the Iraq War. In 2004, at the age of 27, Humayun was killed in Baqubah, Iraq, in an explosion. He was inspecting a guard post when he saw a suspicious vehicle approaching. Ordering his subordinates to stay back, he stepped forward to engage. The car was later determined to have been carrying more than 200 pounds of explosives, and when it detonated he was killed along with the two suicide attackers. He was posthumously awarded the Bronze Star Medal and Purple Heart and is interred at Arlington National Cemetery.

=== Move to Virginia ===
Following Humayun's death, the Khans moved to Charlottesville, Virginia, to be closer to their other sons. Ghazala began working at a fabric store and Khizr continued his legal consulting, working in commercial law and specializing in electronic discovery. They became heavily involved with the University of Virginia ROTC program, where Humayun had been a cadet, and became known as the "mom and pop of the department".

In 2008, the Khans participated in an HBO documentary, Section 60: Arlington National Cemetery, featuring visitors to the section of Arlington National Cemetery where their son, and many other United States military personnel who died in the Iraq and Afghanistan conflicts, are buried.

== Politics ==
Before 2015, the Khans had not been publicly political. In the 1980s, Khizr was a strong supporter of Ronald Reagan, but in 2015 he had a strong negative reaction to then-candidate Donald Trump's speech in favor of temporarily banning citizens of certain primarily Muslim nations from entering the country. He gave an interview on the subject to a reporter for Vocativ, published in December 2015. Many of Khizr's speeches and writings focus on United States founding documents, and in particular the Constitution. He was introduced to them as a law student in Pakistan, and found them both profound and thought-provoking. Starting in 2005, Khizr began carrying pocket constitutions with him, which he would read from and give to University of Virginia ROTC cadets.

=== 2016 DNC speech ===
Khizr Khan speaks at the 2016 Democratic National Convention

Prior to the 2016 Democratic National Convention, Hillary Clinton's campaign reached out to the Khans about speaking at the event. The couple deliberated and eventually agreed, believing it to be what Humayun would have done, despite protests from their other sons that it would make them targets for criticism. In planning for the speech, Ghazala opted not to speak on stage, worried that she would not be able to maintain her composure if a picture of her son were with them.

On July 28, the final day of the convention, Khizr, accompanied by Ghazala, gave a speech about Humayun, during which he harshly criticized Republican nominee for president, Donald Trump. Khan took issue with several of Trump's policies, including his proposed ban on migration from a list of majority-Muslim countries. Many news outlets focused on two passages from the speech in particular:

Donald Trump, you're asking Americans to trust you with their future. Let me ask you, have you even read the United States Constitution? I will gladly lend you my copy. In this document, look for the words "liberty" and "equal protection of law." Have you ever been to Arlington Cemetery? Go look at the graves of brave patriots who died defending the United States of America. You will see all faiths, genders, and ethnicities. You have sacrificed nothing—and no one.

When Khizr offered to lend Trump his copy of the Constitution, he pulled a small version of the document from his pocket, holding it up and gesturing with it, in what the Washington Post called the most memorable image from the convention. Khan said afterwards that the gesture was unplanned, and that he ad-libbed the sentence about lending Trump his copy upon realizing he had it in his pocket. According to the New York Times, Khan has long kept a supply of pocket Constitutions in his home, carrying one around and distributing copies to visitors "the way other hosts might distribute a party favor." Following the speech, sales of pocket Constitutions soared, with one 2005 edition rising to the second position on Amazon.com's bestsellers list. The ACLU offered free copies through their website until Election Day (November 8, 2016), but public demand (reportedly over 100,000) exhausted their supply within days. The ACLU also offered an "I'll gladly lend you mine" graphic tee shirt. A year later, The Guardian's Simon Hattenstone called it "a defining image" of the election, which "remains the most eloquent response to Trump's bigotry."

New York magazine's Andrew Sullivan declared the speech "the fulcrum of this election," and one minute after it had ended, a spike in searches for "register to vote" was seen on Google.

==== Trump's response ====
In an interview with ABC News, George Stephanopoulos asked Trump about the content of the speech, asking him to respond to the charge that he had not made sacrifices. Trump began by suggesting that Hillary Clinton's campaign staff had written the speech (according to Khizr, they wrote it themselves), and said, "I think I've made a lot of sacrifices ... I've created thousands and thousands of jobs, tens of thousands of jobs, built great structures. I've had tremendous success. I think I've done a lot." He went on to describe financial help he has provided for veterans' causes. Trump also remarked on Ghazala's presence on stage, implying a connection between her silence and gender roles in Islam: "If you look at his wife, she was standing there. She had nothing to say. She probably—maybe she wasn't allowed to have anything to say. You tell me."

Directly responding to Trump's comments, Ghazala wrote an op-ed in The Washington Post, saying that Trump is ignorant with regard to Islam and its relationship to terrorism, and explaining that while she was asked if she wanted to speak, she felt she would be too upset to do so. In an interview on Morning Joe the day after the op-ed was published, she added, "All Muslim women have very strong opinions if they have to talk to their husbands they can say anything they like to. We are not from that type of culture that we will just have to follow the husband. Islam teaches us to be equal, but we have different responsibility. At home wife is in charge, outside men, whatever, he his making, whatever, he is bringing home and we both got together as husband and wife to raise the family."

==== Political and public reaction ====
Trump's comments sparked widespread outrage and condemnation from both Democrats and Republicans, and were widely reported in the press. Prominently, Republican Senator John McCain of Arizona, who Khizr says was a hero to Humayun, issued a statement about what he called his "most severe disagreement" with Trump, saying "While our party has bestowed upon him the nomination, it is not accompanied by unfettered license to defame those who are the best among us." In a Washington Post op-ed, Republican Senator Susan Collins of Maine cited Trump's treatment of the Khans as one of the major reasons why she "will not be voting for Donald Trump for president."

Muslim American women took to social media with the hashtag "#CanYouHearUsNow" to protest Trump's comments. The organization Veterans of Foreign Wars issued a statement saying, "Election year or not, the VFW will not tolerate anyone berating a Gold Star family member for exercising his or her right of speech or expression." Paul Rieckhoff of the Iraq and Afghanistan Veterans of America said that Trump's comparison of his own sacrifice to families who lost family members in war was "insulting, foolish and ignorant." The Jewish War Veterans of the United States said that Trump was worthy of "contempt" and said that his remarks on Ghazala Khan were "vile beyond words." An open letter by 23 Gold Star families called upon Trump to apologize to the Khans.

On August 4, a group of protesters at a Trump rally in Portland, Maine, were ejected after standing among the seated attendees and silently holding up pocket Constitutions.

On August 5, Khizr told Anderson Cooper that he and his wife were withdrawing from further TV appearances because it was emotionally draining, but said they would not be silent. On September 3, the Khans were special guests at the Islamic Society of North America convention in Rosemont, Illinois, where they both spoke. They did not address the election, other than Ghazala joking, "I have to speak today."

Khizr made one other high-profile appearance before the election on October 21, 2016, when the Hillary Clinton campaign released a 60-second television ad featuring Khizr Khan at home, showing the viewer pictures and mementos while telling the story of Humayun's sacrifice, and his voice wells up as he concludes, "I want to ask Mr. Trump: Would my son have a place in your America?" In the final weeks of the election, Khizr joined Hillary Clinton on the campaign trail in Virginia.

=== Post-election activities ===
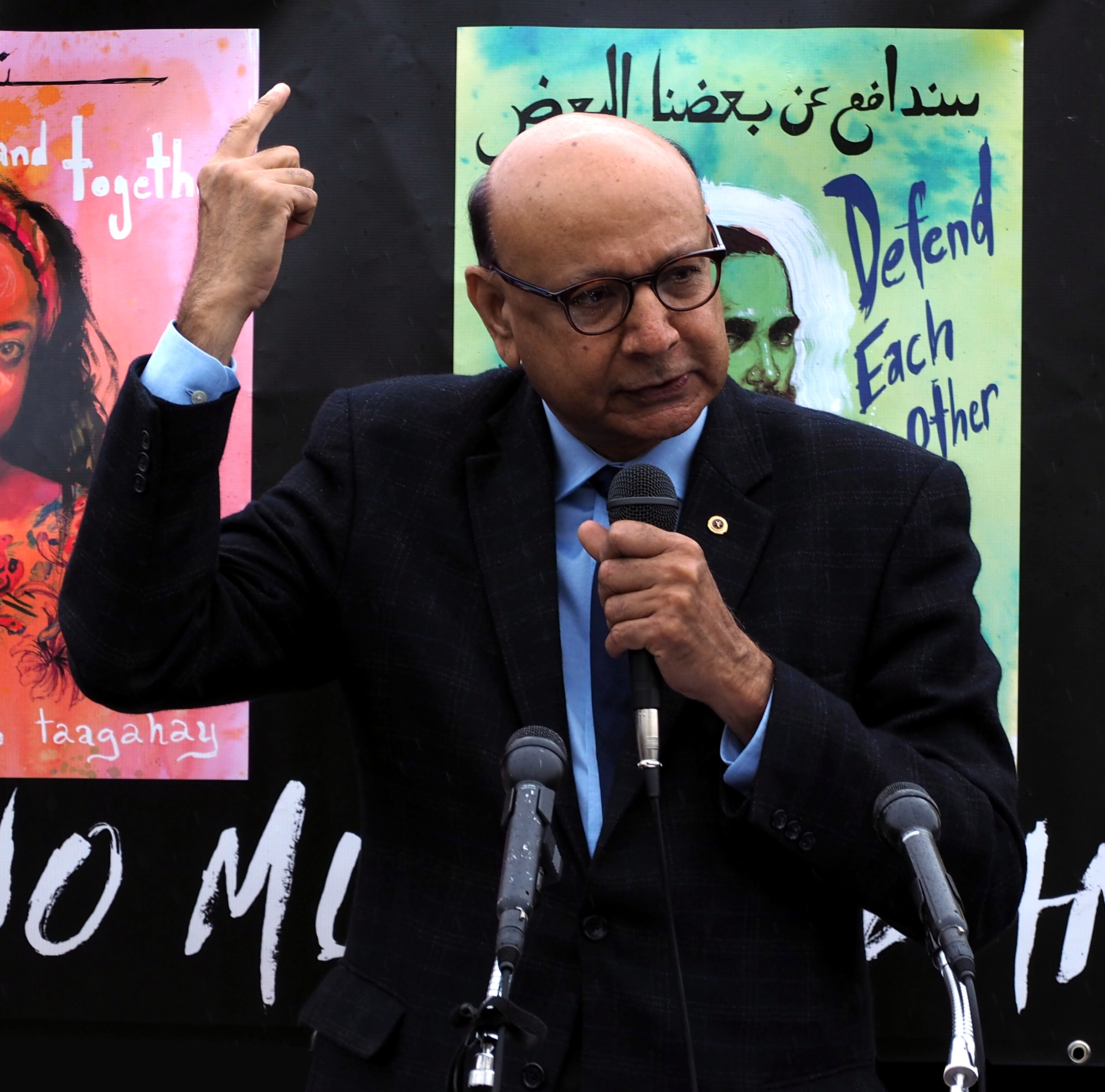
Khizr Khan speaking at the "No Muslim Ban Ever" rally outside the Supreme Court, April 2018

After Trump's victory in the presidential election, in response to his announced nominations for cabinet positions before the inauguration, Khizr Khan urged the Senate Judiciary Committee to reject Senator Jeff Sessions as Attorney General, pointing out the Senate's rejection of Sessions in 1986 for a federal judgeship over racism concerns, and adding that Sessions "does not understand patriotic dissent." Khizr also voiced opposition against Trump's travel ban on seven Muslim-majority countries, threatening an anti-Trump boycott if the ban was not repealed.

On March 5, 2017, Khan canceled a planned speaking engagement in Toronto and said he had been told that his travel privileges were being reviewed. His Facebook announcement said, "This turn of events is not just of deep concern to me but to all my fellow Americans who cherish our freedom to travel abroad. I have not been given any reason as to why." Camielle Edwards, spokeswoman for Canada's Immigration Minister Ahmed Hussen, said, "We are unaware of any restrictions regarding this traveler." Khan later said that he "did not want to go through the hassle of uncertain rules and capricious implementation" at the border.

On August 18, 2020, Khan appeared on video as a delegate at the Democratic National Convention to announce the votes of Virginia for Joe Biden.

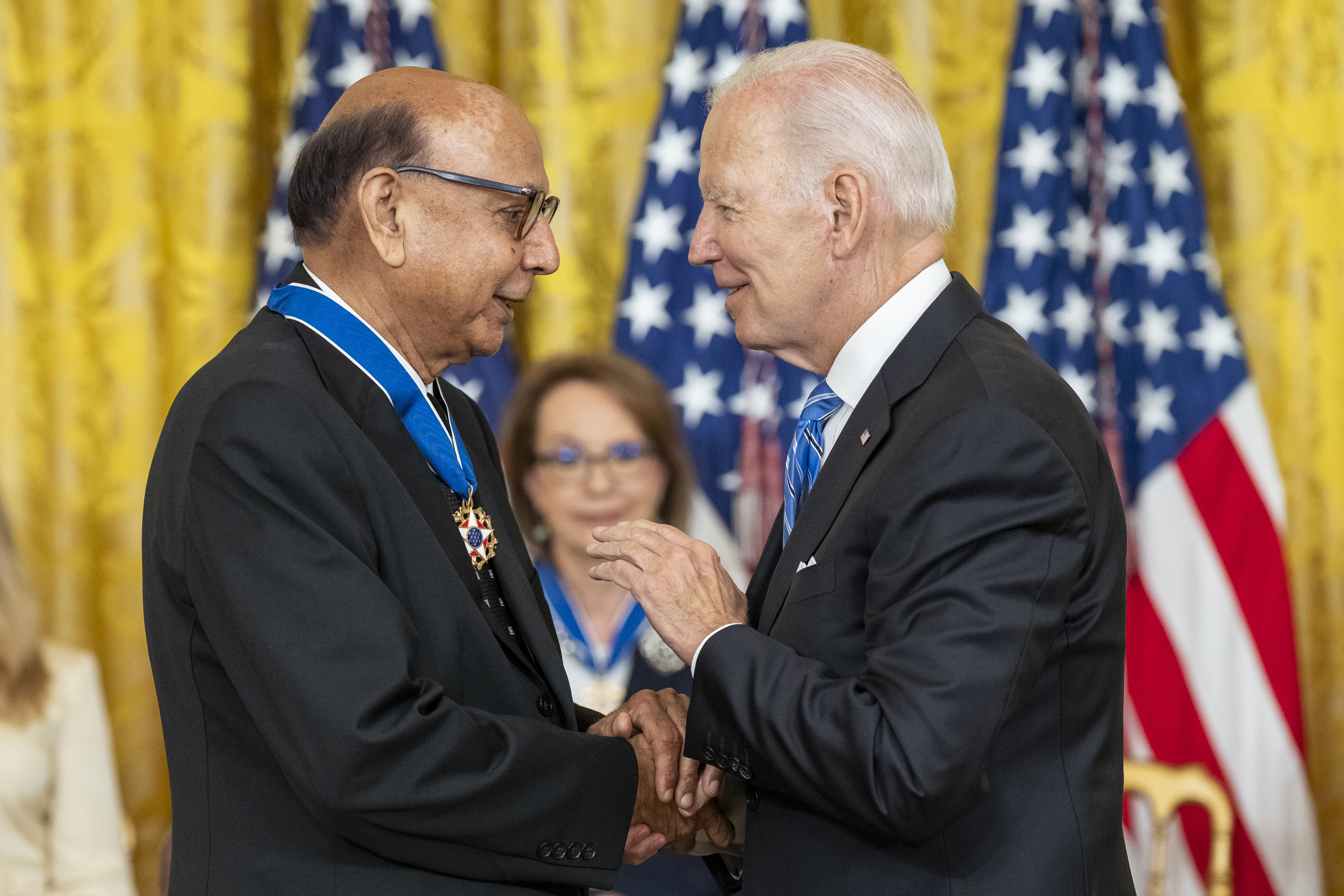
Khizr Khan awarded the Presidential Medal of Freedom by President Joe Biden in July 2022

On July 30, 2021, President Biden announced plans to appoint Khan to the United States Commission on International Religious Freedom; presidential appointments to the commission do not require congressional approval. On July 1, 2022, the White House announced that Khizr Khan would be awarded the Presidential Medal of Freedom.

Khizr is also the founder of the Constitution Literacy and National Unity Project.

== Memoir ==
Khizr published a memoir in October 2017 entitled An American Family: A Memoir of Hope and Sacrifice, published by Random House. Simon Hattenstone wrote in The Guardian that while "it tells the story of the Khan family ... it is also a universal story of migration—struggle, hope and achievement". In the New York Times Book Review, Linda Chavez said it "can teach all of us what real American patriotism looks like" and called it "a wonderful refutation of Trump's nativism and bigotry" without becoming a "partisan polemic". Alyssa Rosenberg wrote in The Washington Post that the memoir is "a small but lovely immigrant's journey" which successfully avoids "Trump outbursts". She went on to say that "Khizr Khan is probably a better American than I am. But it's a strength of his book that I felt inspired, rather than condemned, by that conclusion."

Khizr also wrote a book with Anne Quirk in 2019 entitled This is Our Constitution, published by Yearling. The book is intended for the younger audience, especially dedicated to the middle school students and teachers. In the book Khizr informs the readers about the U.S. Constitution and also shares his personal reflection. The "proceeds from the books are allocated to a need based scholarship titled 'CPT Humayun Khan Memorial Scholarship' at the University of Virginia".

== See also ==
- Gold Star Fathers Act of 2014
- American Gold Star Mothers
- Gold Star Mothers National Monument
