= Bilal Khan =

Bilal Khan may refer to:

- Bilal Khan (judge) (born 1949), Pakistani judge
- Bilal Khan (actor) (1978–2010), Pakistani actor
- Bilal Khan (singer) (born 1986), Pakistani singer
- Bilal Khan (cricketer) (born 1988), Omani cricketer
- Bilal Khan (footballer) (born 1994), Indian footballer
- Bilal Akbar Khan, Pakistani politician
- Bilal Khan, fictional character portrayed by Kay Kay Menon in the 2015 Indian film Baby
