= Prithimpassa Union =

Prithimpassa Union পৃথিমপাশা ইউনিয়ন
- Union Council
- No. 12 Prithimpassa Union Council
- Location in Bangladesh
- Country: Bangladesh
- Division: Sylhet Division
- District: Moulvibazar District
- Upazila: Kulaura Upazila

Government
  - Union Parishad Chairman: Jimiur Rahman Chowdhury (Mandela)

Population
  - Total: 31,341
- Demonym: Prithimpassi
- Time zone: UTC+6 (BST)
- Website: prithimpassaup.moulvibazar.gov.bd

Prithimpassa Union (Bengali: পৃথিমপাশা ইউনিয়ন) is a Union Parishad under Kulaura Upazila of Moulvibazar District in the division of Sylhet, Bangladesh. It has an area of 21 square kilometres and a population of 18,053.

== History ==
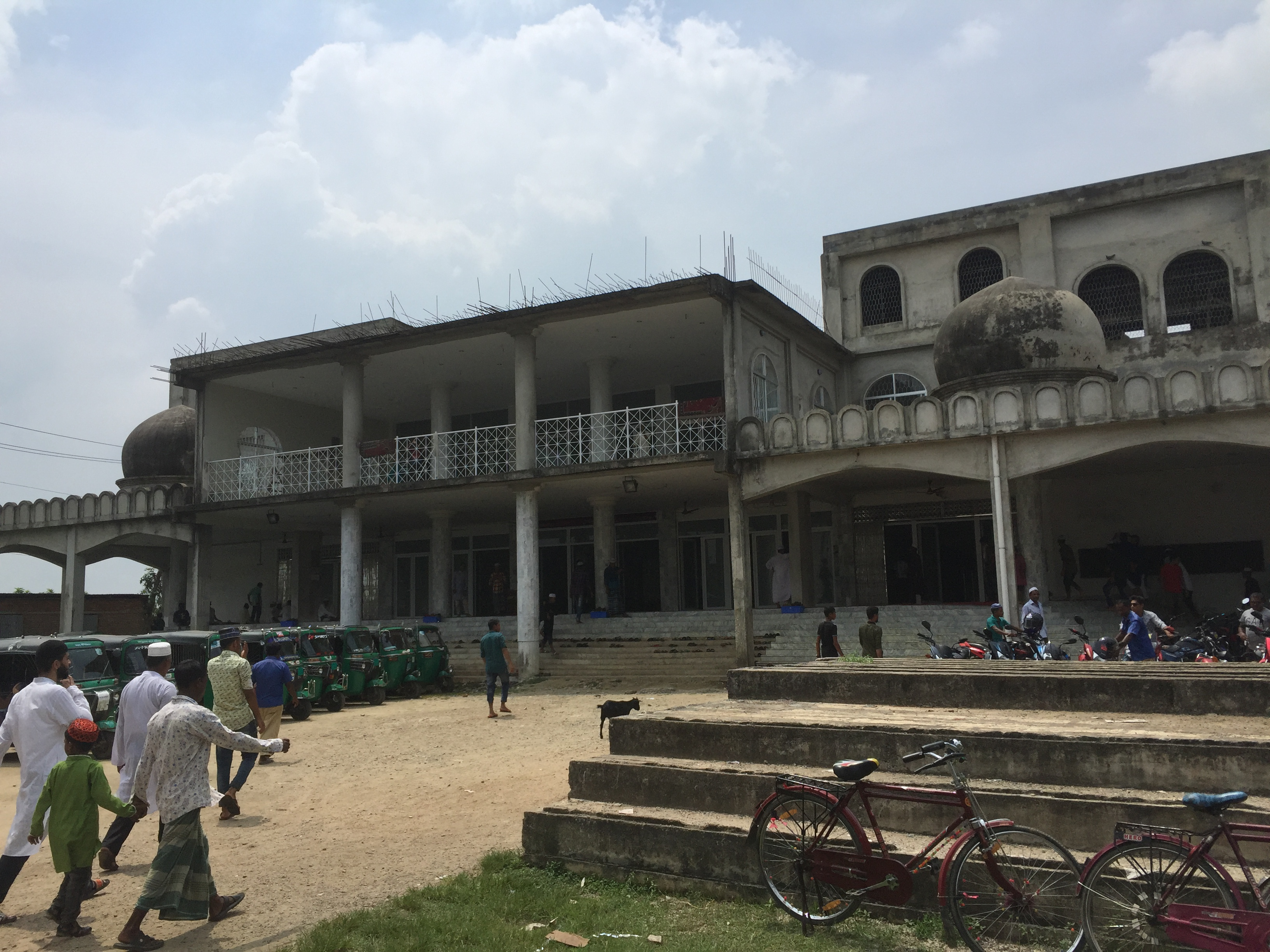
The ancient Rabir Bazar Jame Masjid.

The union was named after the village of Prithimpassa, home of the Prithimpassa Nawab family. In 1499, a Pashtun nobleman from Greater Khorasan, Persia known as Prince Sakhi Salamat settled in Prithimpassa, Kulaura. Being a wealthy nobleman; he was granted a Jagir in mouza Prithimpassa by the Lodi sultans of Delhi from where he established the Prithimpassa family. His son, Ismail Khan Lodhi, was granted a jagir by the Mughals and given the status of Nawab in addition to other prestigious titles.

In 1756, the Nawab of Longla Moulvi Muhammad Rabi Khan Danishmand established the famous Rabir Bazar (Rabi's Market). Begum Talib-un-Nisa Khatun of Chhoto Saheb Bari (Prithimpasha village) established the Rabir Bazar Jame Masjid.

In the anti-British Sepoy Mutiny of 1857, 300 sepoys who revolted against the British, looted the Chittagong Treasury and took shelter with Nawab Gaus Ali Khan of Prithimpassa. The treasury remained under rebel control for several days. Abdul Ghafur, grandfather of Ali Haydar ibn Ali Gawhar, of Kanihati was present during the mutiny.

In 1950, the Shah of Iran, Mohammad Reza Pahlavi, visited Prithimpassa and stayed for four days at the palace and went wildlife hunting in the Estate forests alongside Khwaja Nazimuddin and Ayub Khan.

== Demography ==
Prithimpassa Estate front view

Prithimpassa has a population of 18,053.

== Administration ==
Prithimpassa constitutes the no. 11 union council of Kulaura Upazila. It contains villages and mouzas.

== Economy and tourism ==
Prithimpassa has a significant number of British and American immigrants contributing to its economy. It has three state-owned bazaars; Robir Bazar, Chhoidol Bazar and Brindaranir Dighir Par Bazar, and it also has four non-governmental bazaars; Rajnagar Chaumuhani Bazar, Nandigram Bazar, Pursai Bazar and Jhilerpar Bazar. The Prithimpassa family estate is a historical site which attracts tourism in the Union.

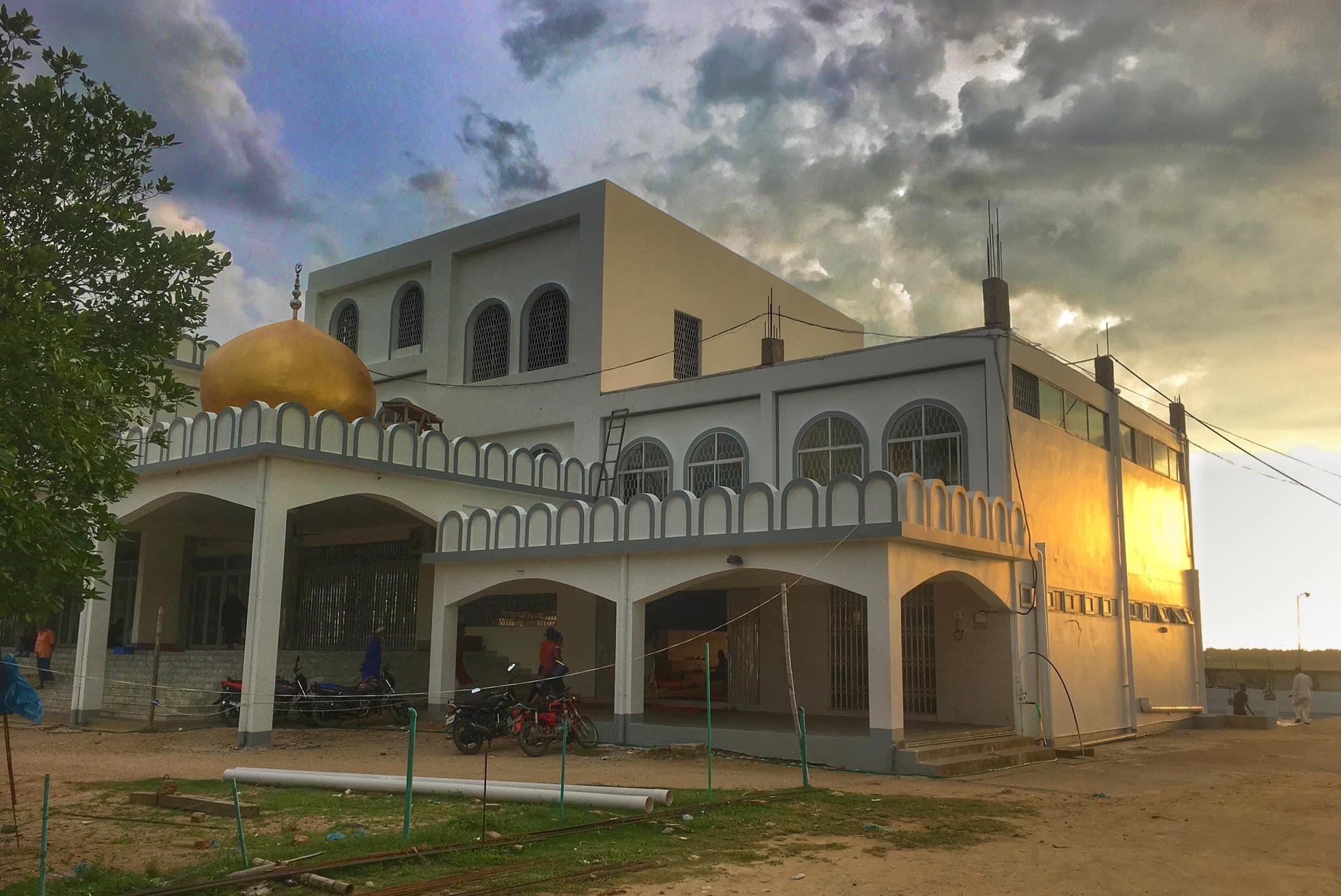
Robirbazar Jame Mosque

== Language and culture ==
The native population converse in their native Sylheti dialect but can also converse in Standard Bengali. Languages such as Arabic and English are also taught in schools. The Union contains 14 eidgahs; Shikoriya, Gonokiya, Dhamuli, East Gajbhag, Karaigram, Alinagar, Shomman Shahi, Kanaitikor, Yusuf Sadar, Rajnagar, Rabir Bazar, Sultanpur Shahi, Bhatgaon and Pursai Eidgah. There are many mosques, most notable is the historic Rabir Bazar Jame Masjid.

== List of chairmen ==
List of chairmen
Number	Name	Term	Note
01	Nawab Ali Yeawar Khan (Fakhru Nawab)		
02	Nawab Ali Safdar Khan (Raja Saheb)		
03	Md Mahbubur Rahman Chowdhury (Notu Miah)		
04	Muhammad Abdul Wahid	1973-1987	Alauddin Ahmad served as Vice-chairman
05	Muhammad Abdul Ghafur	28/2/1988 - 22/8/1989	
06	Muhammad Ishaq Ali	23/8/1989 - 31/3/1992	
07	Nawab Ali Naqi Khan	1/4/1992 - 4/2/1998	
08	Muhammad Abdul Latif	5/2/1998 - 3/3/2003	
09	Nawab Ali Naqi Khan	4/3/2003 - 1/8/2011	
10	Muhammad Abdul Latif	2/8/2011 - 1/8/2016	
11	Nawab Ali Baquar Khan (Hasnain)	2/8/2016 - 17/1/2021	
12	Jimiur Rahman Chowdhury	18/1/2021 - present	
