= Ali Amjad Khan =

East Pakistani politician

Ali Amjad Khan was a Member of the 3rd National Assembly of Pakistan as a representative of East Pakistan.

== Career ==
Khan was a Member of the 3rd National Assembly of Pakistan representing Dacca-III.
